= Fletcher (surname) =

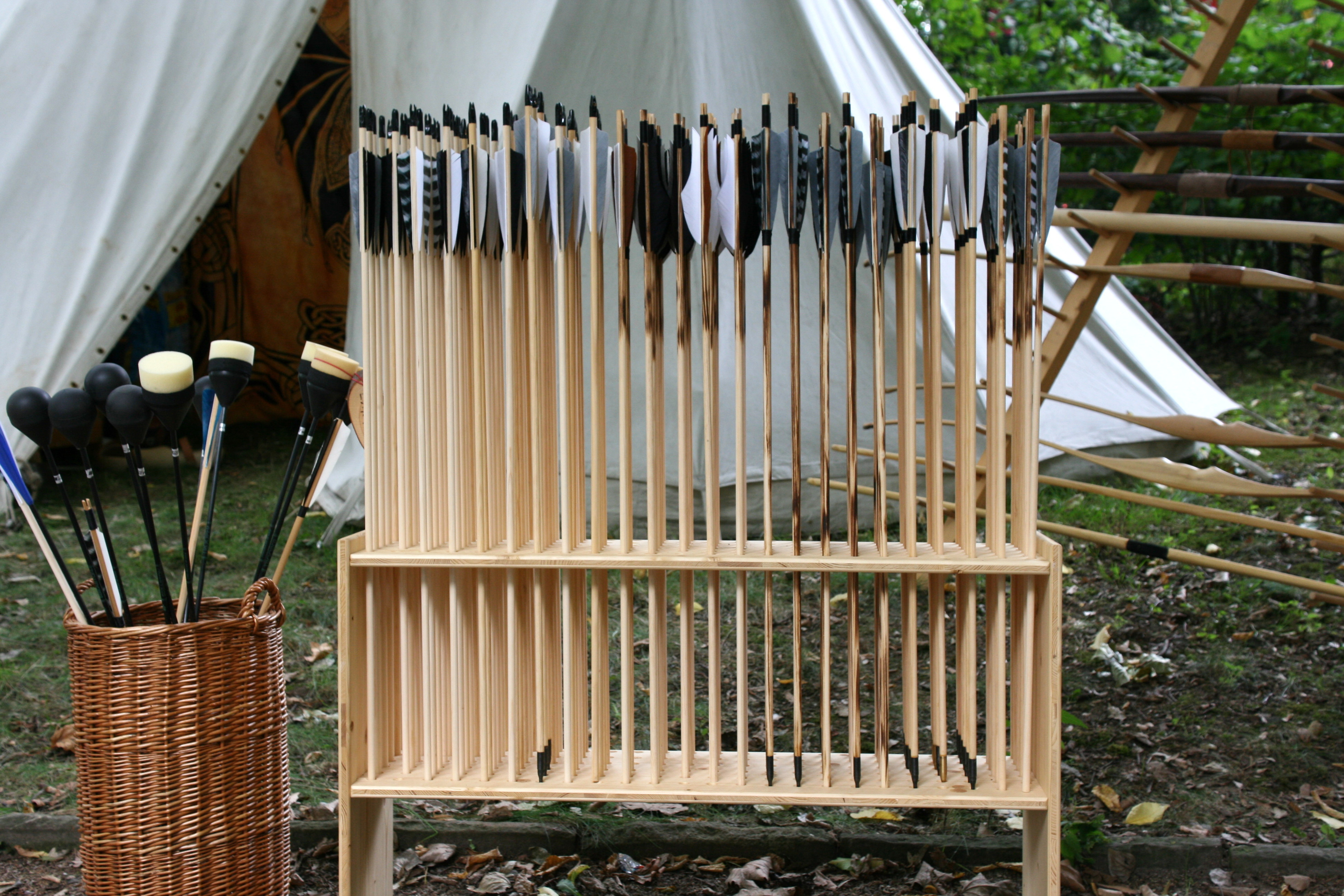
- Arrows
- Language: Middle English and French

Origin
- Meaning: Regional and occupational name for an arrowsmith or seller of arrows
- Region of origin: French (La Flèche), England, Scotland, Ireland

Other names
- Variant forms: de la Flèche, de La Flèche, Flecher, Flechier, Mac an Fhleisteir, Fleisdear

Fletcher is an Anglo-Norman surname of French, English, Scottish and Irish origin. The name is a regional (La Flèche) and an occupational name for an arrowsmith (a maker and or seller of arrows), derived from the Old French flecher (in turn from Old French fleche "arrow"). The English word was borrowed into the Goidelic languages, leading to the development of the Scottish name "Mac an Fhleisteir" (also spelt "Mac an Fhleisdeir"), "the arrowsmith's son".

While Fletcher was the occupational name, it was more often not the surname of a fletcher or arrowsmith professional. The progenitor of the family was Jean de la Flèche, a Norman noble from La Flèche, where he later succeeded his father to became its second seigneur (lord) and held its original castle. He was the youngest son of Seigneur Lancelin I de Beaugency (the first lord of Beaugency) and he married Paula of Maine, daughter of the Count of Maine. They were the parents of Elias I, Count of Maine and great-grandparents of King Henry II. Jean de la Flèche was granted land in England for services by William the Conqueror and some of his descendents and family settled in Yorkshire, England following the Norman Conquest.

== People ==
- Aaron Fletcher (born 1996), American baseball player
- Adam Fletcher (disambiguation), multiple people:
  - Adam F.C. Fletcher (born 1975), author, activist and educator
  - Adam Fletcher (rugby league) (born 1983), rugby league player
- Alan Fletcher (graphic designer) (1931–2006), British graphic designer
- Alan Fletcher (actor) (born 1957), Australian actor
- Anashuya Fletcher (born 1984), New Zealand Anglican bishop
- Andrew Fletcher (disambiguation), multiple people:
  - Andrew Fletcher, Lord Innerpeffer (died 1650), Scottish judge
  - Andrew Fletcher (patriot) (1653–1716), Scottish writer, politician and patriot
  - Andrew Fletcher, British Member of Parliament for Haddington Burghs
  - Andrew Fletcher, Lord Milton (1692–1766), Scottish judge and Lord Justice Clerk, nephew of the above
  - Andy Fletcher (American football) (1895–1978), American football player
  - Andrew Fletcher (cricketer) (born 1993), New Zealand cricketer
  - Andy Fletcher (rugby league), rugby league footballer of the 1970s, 1980s and 1990s
  - Andy Fletcher (umpire) (born 1966), American baseball umpire
  - Andrew Fletcher (businessman), Australian businessman
  - Andy Fletcher (musician) (1961–2022), co-founder and member of the English electronic band Depeche Mode
  - Andrew Almon Fletcher, known as Almon Fletcher (1889–1964), Canadian physician and diabetologist
- Andre Fletcher (born 1987), Grenadian and West Indies cricketer
- Anthony Fletcher (1941–2026), English historian
- Art Fletcher (1885–1950), American baseball player
- Arthur Fletcher (1924–2005), American government official
- Arthur Fletcher (rugby league), English rugby league player
- Ashley Michael Fletcher (born 1995), English professional footballer
- Banister Fletcher (Senior) (1833–1899), English architect, historian and member of Parliament
- Sir Banister Fletcher (1866–1953), English architect and historian
- Barry Fletcher (born 1935), English cricketer
- Betty Fletcher (1923–2012), American federal judge
- Blandford Fletcher (1858–1936), British painter
- Bob Fletcher (1911–2013), California farmer who helped ethnic Japanese neighbors during World War II
- Bryan Fletcher (disambiguation), multiple people:
  - Bryan Fletcher (rugby league) (born 1974), Australian former rugby league footballer
  - Bryan Fletcher (American football) (born 1979), American football player
  - Bryan Fletcher (skier) (born 1986), American Nordic combined skier
- C. T. Fletcher (born 1959), American powerlifter, actor, video blogger
- Cari Fletcher (born 1994), American singer and songwriter known as Fletcher
- Carl Fletcher (Canadian soccer), footballer born 1971
- Carl Fletcher (Welsh footballer), footballer born 1980
- Carrie Hope Fletcher (born 1992), English actress, singer, author, blogger, vlogger
- Charles Fletcher (disambiguation), multiple people:
  - Charles K. Fletcher (1902–1985), U.S. Representative from California
  - Charles Joseph Fletcher (1923–2011), American inventor and businessman
  - Charles Brunsdon Fletcher (1859–1946), English-born Australian surveyor and journalist
  - Charles Tenshin Fletcher, Zen Buddhist
  - Charles Fletcher (composer) (1884–1965), American composer
  - Charles H. Fletcher III, climate scientist
  - Charles Henry Fletcher (1837–1922), American businessman
  - Charles George Fletcher (1890–1959), lawyer and political figure in Ontario
  - Charles L. Fletcher (born 1971), American architectural consultant and interior designer
  - Charles Fletcher (rugby union)
- Chris Fletcher (born 1948), American football player (San Diego Chargers)
- Christian Fletcher (c. 1619–1691), Scottish minister's wife who helped save the Honours of Scotland
- Christopher Fletcher (born 1957), English cricket player (Sussex)
- Christopher D. M. Fletcher (1958–2024), British pathologist
- Christy Fletcher (1933–1974), Irish football player
- Colin Fletcher (1922–2007), Welsh-American backpacker and author
- Coyne Fletcher (c. 1853–1904), Irish-American novelist, playwright
- Cyril Fletcher (1913–2005), English comedian, actor and businessman
- Darren Fletcher (born 1984), Scottish footballer
- Darrin Fletcher (born 1966), American baseball player
- David Fletcher (disambiguation), multiple people
  - David Fletcher (baseball) (born 1994), American baseball player
  - David Fletcher (bishop) (died 1665), bishop of Argyll in Scotland
  - David Fletcher (cricketer) (1924–2015), British cricketer
  - David Fletcher (cyclist) (born 1989), British cross-country mountain biker and cyclo-cross rider
  - David Fletcher (military historian) (born 1942), British military historian
  - David Fletcher (musician) (1971–2009), British musician
  - David Fletcher (swimmer) (born 1936), swimmer from Northern Ireland
- Dominic Fletcher (born 1997), American baseball outfielder
- Duncan Fletcher (born 1948), Zimbabwean cricketer and coach of the England and India cricket teams
- Dustin Fletcher (born 1975), Australian football player
- Edward Fletcher (disambiguation), multiple people:
  - Edward Fletcher (engineer) (1807–1889), British engineer and locomotive superintendent
  - Edward Taylor Fletcher (1817–1897), Canadian land surveyor and writer
  - Edward Fletcher (politician) (1911–1983), British Labour Party politician
  - Duke Bootee (Edward G. Fletcher), rapper and hip hop and rap producer
  - Ed Fletcher (1872–1955), American politician
  - Ted Fletcher (1925–2000), Australian rules footballer
- Elias I, Count of Maine (died 1110), Count of Maine and great-grandfather of Henry II of England
- Eric Fletcher (1903–1990), English politician and peer
- Ernie Fletcher (born 1952), governor of Kentucky
- Fletcher Christian (1764–1793), master's mate on HMS Bounty during William Bligh's voyage to Tahiti
- Frank Friday Fletcher (1855–1928), admiral in the United States Navy
- Frank Jack Fletcher (1885–1973), admiral in the United States Navy
- Freddie Fletcher (born 1950), English actor
- George Fletcher (disambiguation), multiple people:
  - Sir George Fletcher, 2nd Baronet (1633–1700), English MP for Cumberland 1661–1679, 1681–1685, 1689–1700
  - George Fletcher (politician) (c. 1666–c. 1708), British MP for Cockermouth and Cumberland 1701–1702, 1705–1708
  - George Fletcher (baseball) (1845–1879), baseball player
  - George Fletcher (communist) (1879–1958), British communist activist and baker
  - George P. Fletcher (born 1939), American jurist
  - George Latham Fletcher (1874–1929), American jurist and politician
  - George M. Fletcher (1850–1915), American politician
  - George Fletcher (cowboy), American cowboy and rodeo rider
- Georgina Fletcher, 20th-century women's rights activist active in Colombia
- Giles Fletcher, the Elder (c. 1548–1611), English poet and diplomat
- Giles Fletcher (c. 1586–1623), English playwright
- Guy Fletcher (born 1960), English keyboard player for the band Dire Straits
- Guy Fletcher (songwriter), English songwriter and session singer
- Harvey Fletcher (1884–1981), American physicist and inventor
- Henry Fletcher (disambiguation), multiple people:
  - Sir Henry Fletcher, 1st Baronet, of Hutton le Forest (died 1645)
  - Sir Henry Fletcher, 3rd Baronet, of Hutton le Forest (1661–1712), English MP for Cockermouth
  - Henry Fletcher (engraver) (fl. 1710–1750), English engraver
  - Sir Henry Fletcher, 1st Baronet, of Clea Hall (1727–1807), British MP for Cumberland
  - Sir Henry Aubrey-Fletcher, 4th Baronet (1835–1910), British MP for Horsham and Lewes
  - Sir Henry Aubrey-Fletcher, 6th Baronet (1887–1969), Lord Lieutenant of Buckinghamshire 1954–1961
  - Sir Henry Aubrey-Fletcher, 8th Baronet (born 1945), Lord Lieutenant of Buckinghamshire since 2006
  - Henry A. Fletcher (1839–1897), American Civil War veteran and Lieutenant Governor of Vermont
  - Henry Fletcher (mayor) (1859–1953), mayor of Providence, Rhode Island 1909–1913
  - Henry P. Fletcher (1873–1959), U.S. diplomat and RNC chair
  - Henry Fletcher (cricketer) (1882–1937), English cricketer
  - Henry Fletcher (missionary) (1868–1933), New Zealand missionary and Presbyterian minister
  - Henry Allason Fletcher (1834–1884), English engineer and locomotive designer
  - Henry Fletcher, pen name of Fletcher Hanks
- Horace Fletcher (1849–1919), American health-food faddist of the Victorian era
- Isaac Fletcher (1784–1842), American lawyer and politician
- Isaac Fletcher (English politician) (1827–1879), English Member of Parliament
- J.S. Fletcher (1863–1935), English novelist and poet
- James Fletcher (1852–1908), Canadian entomologist, botanist, and writer
- James C. Fletcher (1919–1991), NASA administrator
- Jan Fletcher, British entrepreneur
- Jane Fletcher (Australian writer) (1870–1956), Tasmanian author and poet
- Jane Fletcher (English writer) (born 1956), English author of lesbian fiction
- Jason Fletcher (born 1975), American sports agent
- Jean de la Flèche (c. 1030 – c. 1097), Fletcher progenitor and 11th-century French nobleman
- Jo Fletcher, New Zealand professor of education
- Joan Bamford Fletcher (1909–1979), Canadian member of the First Aid Nursing Yeomanry
- Joe Fletcher (referee), Canadian soccer referee
- John Fletcher (disambiguation), multiple people:
  - John Fletcher (MP for Rye) (by 1490–1545 or later)
  - John Fletcher (Canadian commissioner), sent to frontier Manitoba, in 1816, with William Bachelor Coltman
  - Sir John Fletcher, 1st Baronet (1841–1924), British MP for Hampstead
  - John Fletcher (New Zealand politician) (1888–1934), New Zealand Member of Parliament for Grey Lynn
  - John Fletcher (Queensland politician) (1883–1965), Queensland state MP and cricketer
  - John Fletcher (South Australian politician) (1883–1958), South Australian state MP
  - John William Fletcher (1729–1785), early Methodist divine
  - John Fletcher (priest) (died 1848), English Roman Catholic priest and writer
  - John Wesley Fletcher (1940–1996), Assemblies of God pastor
  - John Fletcher (cricketer, born 1893) (1893–1968), Australian cricketer
  - John Fletcher (rower), American rower, gold winner at the 1979 World Rowing Championships
  - John Walter Fletcher (1847–1918), pioneer of soccer (association football) in Australia
  - John Fletcher (fullback) (1901–1977), American college football player
  - John Fletcher (ice hockey) (born 1967), American ice hockey goaltender and coach
  - John Fletcher (lineman) (born 1965), American football offensive and defensive lineman.
  - John Aubrey-Fletcher (1912–1992), British soldier and cricketer
  - John C. Fletcher, American ethicist, see American Society for Bioethics and Humanities
  - John Gould Fletcher (1886–1950), Pulitzer Prize winner
  - John Fletcher (businessman) (born 1951), former CEO of Australian retail company Coles Group
  - John Fletcher (playwright) (1579–1625), Jacobean playwright
  - John Fletcher (tubist) (1941–1987), London Symphony Orchestra
  - John Edward Fletcher (1940–1992), Australian-British scholar
  - Jack Fletcher (voice actor), American voice actor
- Joseph Fletcher (1905–1991), American professor in ethics
- Justin Fletcher (born 1970), English children's television personality
- Keith Fletcher (born 1944), English cricketer
- Kelvin Fletcher (born 1984), British actor
- Kenny Fletcher Jr. (born 2003), American football player
- Kimberly Fletcher, founder of Moms for America
- Kirk Fletcher (born 1975), American blues guitarist, singer and songwriter
- Lacey Fletcher (1985–2022), American homicide victim
- Lawrence Fletcher (died 1608), Jacobean actor
- Lisa Anne Fletcher (1844–1905), American poet and correspondent
- Lloyd Fletcher (1915–1991), United States Court of Federal Claims judge
- Louise Fletcher (1934–2022), American actress
- Lucy Nettie Fletcher (1886–1918), British-born American nurse
- Mark Fletcher (disambiguation), multiple people:
  - Mark Fletcher (businessman), American internet entrepreneur
  - Mark Fletcher (footballer) (born 1965), English former footballer
  - Mark Fletcher (politician) (born 1985), British former Member of Parliament for Bolsover
  - Mark Fletcher Jr. (born 2004), American college football player
- Mary Fletcher (philanthropist) (1830–1885), American philanthropist
- Mary Fletcher (preacher) (1739–1815), English Methodist preacher
- Michael Fletcher (gridiron football) (born 1977), professional Canadian football linebacker
- Michael Scott Fletcher (1868–1947), Australian Methodist minister
- Moses Fletcher, (c. 1564–1620) Mayflower pilgrim
- Najuma Fletcher (born 1974), Guyanese track and field athlete
- Neil Fletcher (politician) (born 1944), British politician
- Norman Fletcher (disambiguation), multiple people:
  - Norman C. Fletcher (1917–2007), American architect
  - Norman S. Fletcher (born 1934), American lawyer and jurist
  - Norman Stanley Fletcher, fictional character known as "Fletch" in UK TV sitcom Porridge
  - Norman Vyner Fletcher (1867–1889), Australian botanist
  - Norm Fletcher (footballer, born 1884) (1884–1938), Australian rules footballer for Geelong
  - Norm Fletcher (footballer, born 1915) (1915–1992), Australian rules footballer for South Melbourne and Hawthorn
- Percy Fletcher (1879–1932), British composer
- Peter Fletcher (disambiguation), multiple people:
  - Peter Fletcher (footballer) (born 1953), English footballer
  - Peter G. Fletcher (1936–1996), British orchestral and choral conductor
  - Peter Fletcher (RAF officer) (1916–1999), Royal Air Force officer
- Phil Fletcher (born 1975/6), British puppeteer
- Phineas Fletcher (1582–1650), English playwright
- Ralph Fletcher (1780–1851), English surgeon and writer
- Ray Fletcher (1921–1991), British politician
- Richard Fletcher (disambiguation), multiple people:
  - Richard Fletcher (American politician) (1788–1869), US Representative from Massachusetts
  - Richard Fletcher (died 1560), MP for Rye
  - Richard Fletcher (died c.1607), MP for Derby (UK Parliament constituency)
  - Richard Fletcher (bishop) (1545–1596), Anglican bishop
  - Sir Richard Fletcher, 1st Baronet (1768–1813), British army officer
  - Richard A. Fletcher (1944–2005), British historian
  - Richard Fletcher (rugby league) (born 1981), British rugby league player
  - Dick Fletcher (1942–2008), meteorologist
  - Richard Fletcher (conductor), American conductor of symphony, opera and ballet orchestras
  - Richard Fletcher-Vane, 2nd Baron Inglewood (born 1951), British Conservative Party politician
- Robert Fletcher (North Carolina politician) (1815–1885), American politician
- Roby Fletcher (1833–1894), Australian Congregational minister
- Rod Fletcher (1945–2023), English footballer
- Rod Fletcher (basketball), American college basketball player
- Ronald Fletcher (1910–1996), English radio announcer and newsreader
- Ronald Malcolm Fletcher (1899–1952), English World War I observer/gunner ace
- Rosamund Fletcher (1908–1993), British sculptor
- Rosey Fletcher (born 1975), American Olympic snowboarder
- Sally Fletcher-Murchison (born 1933), American ceramicist
- Samuel Fletcher (politician) (died 1950), Canadian politician
- Sherry Fletcher (born 1986), Grenadian track and field sprinter
- Simon Fletcher (disambiguation), multiple people:
  - Simon Fletcher (American football) (born 1962), American football linebacker
  - Simon Fletcher (artist), English artist
  - Simon Fletcher (Australian footballer) (born 1978), Australian rules footballer
  - Simon Fletcher (music manager) (born 1964), British music manager
  - Simon Fletcher (political advisor), London based
- Steven Fletcher (footballer) (born 1987), Scottish international footballer
- Tait Fletcher, American professional MMA fighter
- Thomas Fletcher (disambiguation), multiple people:
  - Tom Fletcher (diplomat) (born 1975), British diplomat and writer
  - Thomas Fletcher (Kentucky politician) (1779–?), U.S. representative from Kentucky
  - Thomas Fletcher (Arkansas politician) (1817–1880), acting governor of Arkansas, 1862
  - Thomas Fletcher (MP) (1522–1568), Rye
  - Thomas Fletcher (Canadian politician) (1852–?), member of the British Columbia Legislative Assembly for Alberni
  - Thomas B. Fletcher (1879–1945), U.S. representative from Ohio
  - Thomas Clement Fletcher (1827–1899), governor of Missouri
  - Thomas Fletcher (cricketer) (1881–1954), English cricketer
  - Thomas Fletcher (footballer) (1878–?), English footballer
  - Thomas Fletcher (rugby, born 1874) (1874–1950), English rugby union, and rugby league footballer
  - Thomas Fletcher (rugby league, born 2004), Australian rugby league footballer
  - Thomas Fletcher (American football), NFL player
  - Tom Fletcher (baseball) (1942–2018), Major League Baseball pitcher
  - Thomas Fletcher (bishop) (died 1761), Irish bishop
  - Thomas Fletcher (poet) (1666–1713), English poet and priest
  - Thomas Fletcher (silversmith) (1787–1866), American silversmith
  - Thomas Bainbrigge Fletcher (1878–1950), English entomologist
  - Tom Fletcher (born 1985), English musician and frontman of McFly
  - Tom Fletcher (vaudeville) (1873–1954), American vaudeville performer and autobiographer
  - Tom Fletcher (Home and Away), fictional character in the Australian soap opera Home and Away
  - Thomas Fletcher Oakes (1843–1919), president of Northern Pacific Railway
  - Thomas Fletcher Waghorn (1800–1850), postal pioneer
  - Tom Fletcher Mayson (1893–1958), British recipient of the Victoria Cross
- Tiera Guinn Fletcher, American aerospace engineer
- Viola Fletcher (1914–2025), American civil rights activist
- William Fletcher (disambiguation), multiple people:
  - William Fletcher (Irish judge) (1750–1823), Irish politician and justice of the Court of Common Pleas
  - William A. Fletcher (Michigan judge) (1788–1852), chief justice of the Michigan Supreme Court
  - William Fletcher (English politician) (1831–1900), British member of parliament for Cockermouth, 1879–80
  - William Meade Fletcher (1870–1943), American lawyer, professor and judge
  - William A. Fletcher (born 1945), United States federal appeals court judge
  - William Roby Fletcher (1833–1894), English-born Australian Congregational minister and vice-chancellor of the University of Adelaide
  - William Fletcher (priest) (died 1926), Welsh Anglican priest
  - William Fletcher (engineer) (1848–1918), British author and steam traction engine designer
  - William Fletcher (physician) (1872–1938), English doctor
  - William Whigham Fletcher (1918–2001), Scottish botanist
  - William Thomas Fletcher (born c. 1935), American mathematician
  - William Fletcher (rugby union) (1851–1895), English rugby international
  - William Fletcher (cricketer) (1866–1935), English cricketer for Yorkshire
  - William Fletcher (rower) (1869–1919), English rower and coach
  - Will Fletcher (born 1989), British rower
  - William Fletcher (valet) (c. 1775–1839), servant of Lord Byron
  - William Andrew Fletcher (1839–1915), American author and lumber tycoon
  - William I. Fletcher (1844–1917), American librarian, bibliographer and indexer
  - William Bartlett Fletcher Sr. (1862–1957), admiral in the United States Navy
  - William John Bainbrigge Fletcher (1879–1933), British consul and author of books on Chinese poetry
  - William Bartlett Fletcher Sr. (1862–1957), Rear admiral in the United States Navy
  - William Roby Fletcher, South Australian Congregationalist minister and university administrator
- Yasmeen Fletcher (born 2003), American actress
- Yvonne Fletcher (1959–1984), police officer killed by a gunshot from the Libyan embassy in London

== Fictional characters ==
- Irwin Maurice "Fletch" Fletcher, the main character in the novel Fletch and subsequent novels by Gregory McDonald
- Jamie "Fletch" Fletcher, from the British soap opera Hollyoaks
- Jerry Fletcher, the protagonist of film Conspiracy Theory, portrayed by Mel Gibson
- Fletch, one of the thugs working for the villain Ellis DeWald in the film Beverly Hills Cop III, portrayed by Michael Bowen
- Fletcher, one of the main antagonists in the Tamil movie Dasavathaaram
- Jessica Fletcher, the main character of the television series Murder, She Wrote
- Karl Fletcher, a central character of the British television series Dream Team
- Michael Fletcher, character in the video game Mach Breakers
- Morris Fletcher, a recurring character in The X-Files and The Lone Gunmen
- Mundungus Fletcher, a Harry Potter character
- Norman Stanley Fletcher, the lead character in the British sitcom Porridge
- SJ Fletcher and Sid Fletcher, from the British soap opera EastEnders
- Sally Fletcher, from the Australian soap opera Home and Away
- Will Fletcher, a character in the ITV television drama series The Bill
- Ferb, Lil Fletcher, D-Fletcher, and Lawrence Fletcher, from the Disney Channel series Phineas and Ferb
- The Fletcher family in the film Raise Your Voice
- Brigadier General Fletcher, a character in the video game Supreme Commander: Forged Alliance
- James Emerson (Jaimy) Fletcher, a major supporting character in L. A. Meyer's Bloody Jack series
- Fletcher Reede, the protagonist of the film Liar Liar
- Terrence Fletcher, in the 2014 film Whiplash
- Billy Fletcher, a fictional character in the British soap opera Emmerdale
- Will Fletcher (The Bill), a fictional character in the British TV drama series The Bill

== See also ==
- Clan Fletcher, a Scottish clan recognized by the Lord Lyon King of Arms
- Arrowsmith (surname)
- Fletcher (disambiguation)
- Justice Fletcher (disambiguation)
- Fletching
