= William Fletcher =

William Fletcher may refer to:

== Politics and law ==
- William Fletcher (Irish judge) (1750–1823), Irish politician and justice of the Court of Common Pleas
- William A. Fletcher (Michigan judge) (1788–1852), chief justice of the Michigan Supreme Court
- William Fletcher (English politician) (1831–1900), British member of parliament for Cockermouth, 1879–80
- William Meade Fletcher (1870–1943), American lawyer, professor and judge
- William A. Fletcher (born 1945), United States federal appeals court judge

== Religion ==
- William Roby Fletcher (1833–1894), English-born Australian Congregational minister and vice-chancellor of the University of Adelaide
- William Fletcher (priest) (died 1926), Welsh Anglican priest

== Science ==
- William Fletcher (engineer) (1848–1918), British author and steam traction engine designer
- William Fletcher (physician) (1872–1938), English doctor
- William Whigham Fletcher (1918–2001), Scottish botanist
- William Thomas Fletcher (born c. 1935), American mathematician

== Sport ==
- William Fletcher (rugby union) (1851–1895), English rugby international
- William Fletcher (cricketer) (1866–1935), English cricketer for Yorkshire
- William Fletcher (rower) (1869–1919), English rower and coach
- Will Fletcher (born 1989), British rower

== Other people ==
- William Fletcher (valet) (c. 1775–1839), servant of Lord Byron
- William Andrew Fletcher (1839–1915), American author and lumber tycoon
- William I. Fletcher (1844–1917), American librarian, bibliographer and indexer
- William Bartlett Fletcher Sr. (1862–1957), admiral in the United States Navy
- William John Bainbrigge Fletcher (1879–1933), British consul and author of books on Chinese poetry

== Fictional characters ==
- Billy Fletcher, a fictional character in the British soap opera Emmerdale
- Will Fletcher (The Bill), a fictional character in the British TV drama series The Bill
