= Thomas Fletcher =

Thomas or Tom Fletcher may refer to:

== Politicians ==
- Tom Fletcher (diplomat) (born 1975), British diplomat and writer
- Thomas Fletcher (Kentucky politician) (1779–?), U.S. representative from Kentucky
- Thomas Fletcher (Arkansas politician) (1817–1880), acting governor of Arkansas, 1862
- Thomas Fletcher (MP) (1522–1568), Rye
- Thomas Fletcher (Canadian politician) (1852–?), member of the British Columbia Legislative Assembly for Alberni
- Thomas B. Fletcher (1879–1945), U.S. representative from Ohio
- Thomas Clement Fletcher (1827–1899), governor of Missouri

== Sports ==
- Thomas Fletcher (cricketer) (1881–1954), English cricketer
- Thomas Fletcher (footballer) (1878–?), English footballer
- Thomas Fletcher (rugby, born 1874) (1874–1950), English rugby union, and rugby league footballer
- Thomas Fletcher (rugby league, born 2004), Australian rugby league footballer
- Thomas Fletcher (American football), NFL player
- Tom Fletcher (baseball) (1942–2018), Major League Baseball pitcher

== Others ==
- Thomas Fletcher (bishop) (died 1761), Irish bishop
- Thomas Fletcher (poet) (1666–1713), English poet and priest
- Thomas Fletcher (silversmith) (1787–1866), American silversmith
- Thomas Bainbrigge Fletcher (1878–1950), English entomologist
- Tom Fletcher (born 1985), English musician and frontman of McFly
- Tom Fletcher (vaudeville) (1873–1954), American vaudeville performer and autobiographer
- Tom Fletcher (Home and Away), fictional character in the Australian soap opera Home and Away

== See also ==
- Thomas Fletcher Oakes (1843–1919), president of Northern Pacific Railway
- Thomas Fletcher Waghorn (1800–1850), postal pioneer
- Tom Fletcher Mayson (1893–1958), British recipient of the Victoria Cross
