= Charles Fletcher =

Charles Fletcher may refer to:

- Charles K. Fletcher (1902–1985), U.S. Representative from California
- Charles Joseph Fletcher (1923–2011), American inventor and businessman
- Charles Brunsdon Fletcher (1859–1946), English-born Australian surveyor and journalist
- Charles Tenshin Fletcher, Zen Buddhist
- Charles Fletcher (composer) (1884–1965), American composer
- Chip Fletcher (Charles H. Fletcher III), climate scientist
- Charles Henry Fletcher (1837–1922), American businessman
- Charles George Fletcher (1890–1959), lawyer and political figure in Ontario
- Charles L. Fletcher (born 1971), American architectural consultant and interior designer
- Charles Fletcher (rugby union) (1894–1973), New Zealand international rugby union player
