= George Fletcher =

George Fletcher may refer to:

- Sir George Fletcher, 2nd Baronet (1633–1700), English MP for Cumberland 1661–1679, 1681–1685, 1689–1700
- George Fletcher (politician) (c. 1666–c. 1708), British MP for Cockermouth and Cumberland 1701–1702, 1705–1708
- George Fletcher (baseball) (1845–1879), baseball player
- George Fletcher (communist) (1879–1958), British communist activist and baker
- George P. Fletcher (born 1939), American jurist
- George Latham Fletcher (1874–1929), American jurist and politician
- George M. Fletcher (1850–1915), American politician
- George Fletcher (cowboy), American cowboy and rodeo rider
