= John Fletcher =

John Fletcher may refer to:

== Politicians ==
- John Fletcher (MP for Rye) (by 1490–1545 or later)
- John Fletcher (Canadian commissioner), sent to frontier Manitoba, in 1816, with William Bachelor Coltman when rival fur traders started killing one another
- Sir John Fletcher, 1st Baronet (1841–1924), British MP for Hampstead
- John Fletcher (New Zealand politician) (1888–1934), New Zealand Member of Parliament for Grey Lynn
- John Fletcher (Queensland politician) (1883–1965), Queensland state MP and cricketer
- John Fletcher (South Australian politician) (1883–1958), South Australian state MP

== Religion ==
- John William Fletcher (1729–1785), early Methodist divine
- John Fletcher (priest) (died 1848), English Roman Catholic priest and writer
- John Wesley Fletcher (1940–1996), Assemblies of God pastor

== Sports ==
- John Fletcher (cricketer, born 1893) (1893–1968), Australian cricketer
- John Fletcher (rower), American rower, gold winner at the 1979 World Rowing Championships
- John Walter Fletcher (1847–1918), pioneer of soccer (association football) in Australia
- John Fletcher (fullback) (1901–1977), American college football player
- John Fletcher (ice hockey) (born 1967), American ice hockey goaltender and coach
- John Fletcher (lineman) (born 1965), American football offensive and defensive lineman.

== Others ==
- John Aubrey-Fletcher (1912–1992), British soldier and cricketer
- John C. Fletcher, American ethicist, see American Society for Bioethics and Humanities
- John Gould Fletcher (1886–1950), Pulitzer Prize winner
- John Fletcher (businessman) (born 1951), former CEO of Australian retail company Coles Group
- John Fletcher (playwright) (1579–1625), Jacobean playwright
- John Fletcher (tubist) (1941–1987), London Symphony Orchestra
- John Edward Fletcher (1940–1992), Australian-British scholar
- Jack Fletcher (voice actor), American voice actor
