= Andrew Fletcher =

Andrew Fletcher may refer to:

== Government ==
- Andrew Fletcher, Lord Innerpeffer (died 1650), Scottish judge
- Andrew Fletcher (patriot) (1655–1716), Scottish writer, politician and patriot
- Andrew Fletcher, British Member of Parliament for Haddington Burghs
- Andrew Fletcher, Lord Milton (1692–1766), Scottish judge and Lord Justice Clerk, nephew of the above

== Sports ==
- Andy Fletcher (American football) (1895–1978), American football player
- Andrew Fletcher (cricketer) (born 1993), New Zealand cricketer
- Andy Fletcher (rugby league), rugby league footballer of the 1970s, 1980s and 1990s
- Andy Fletcher (umpire) (born 1966), American baseball umpire

== Others ==
- Andrew Fletcher (businessman), Australian businessman
- Andy Fletcher (musician) (1961–2022), co-founder and member of the English electronic band Depeche Mode
- Andrew Almon Fletcher, known as Almon Fletcher (1889–1964), Canadian physician and diabetologist
