= Norman Fletcher =

Norman Fletcher may refer to:

- Norman C. Fletcher (1917–2007), American architect
- Norman S. Fletcher (born 1934), American lawyer and jurist
- Norman Stanley Fletcher, fictional character known as "Fletch" in UK TV sitcom Porridge
- Norman Vyner Fletcher (1867–1889), Australian botanist
- Norm Fletcher (footballer, born 1884) (1884–1938), Australian rules footballer for Geelong
- Norm Fletcher (footballer, born 1915) (1915–1992), Australian rules footballer for South Melbourne and Hawthorn
