= Edward Fletcher =

Edward Fletcher may refer to:

- Edward Fletcher (engineer) (1807–1889), British engineer and locomotive superintendent
- Edward Taylor Fletcher (1817–1897), Canadian land surveyor and writer
- Edward Fletcher (politician) (1911–1983), British Labour Party politician
- Duke Bootee (Edward G. Fletcher), rapper and hip hop and rap producer
- Ed Fletcher (1872–1955), American politician
- Ted Fletcher (1925–2000), Australian rules footballer
