= Jack Fletcher =

Jack Fletcher may refer to:

- Jack Fletcher Jr. (fl. 1904–1906), Australian rules footballer
- Jack Fletcher (footballer, 1905-unknown), English football outside forward
- Jack Fletcher (British Army officer) (1928–1976), British Army officer
- Jack Fletcher (voice actor) (born 1964), American voice actor
- Jack Fletcher (footballer, born 2007), English football midfielder for Manchester United

== See also ==
- John Fletcher (disambiguation)
- Frank Jack Fletcher (1885–1973), United States Navy admiral
