= David Fletcher =

David Fletcher may refer to:

- David Fletcher (baseball) (born 1994), American baseball player
- David Fletcher (bishop) (died 1665), bishop of Argyll in Scotland
- David Fletcher (cricketer) (1924–2015), British cricketer
- David Fletcher (cyclist) (born 1989), British cross-country mountain biker and cyclo-cross rider
- David Fletcher (military historian) (born 1942), British military historian
- David Fletcher (musician) (1971–2009), British musician
- David Fletcher (swimmer) (born 1936), swimmer from Northern Ireland
