= Richard Fletcher =

Richard Fletcher may refer to:

== Politicians ==
- Richard Fletcher (American politician) (1788–1869), US Representative from Massachusetts
- Richard Fletcher (died 1560), MP for Rye
- Richard Fletcher (died c.1607), MP for Derby (UK Parliament constituency)

== Others ==
- Richard Fletcher (bishop) (1545–1596), Anglican bishop
- Sir Richard Fletcher, 1st Baronet (1768–1813), British army officer
- Richard A. Fletcher (1944–2005), British historian
- Richard Fletcher (rugby league) (born 1981), British rugby league player
- Dick Fletcher (1942–2008), meteorologist
- Richard Fletcher (conductor), American conductor of symphony, opera and ballet orchestras

=== See also ===
- Richard Fletcher-Vane, 2nd Baron Inglewood (born 1951), British Conservative Party politician
