= Mark Fletcher =

Mark Fletcher may refer to:

- Mark Fletcher (businessman), American internet entrepreneur
- Mark Fletcher (footballer) (born 1965), English former footballer
- Mark Fletcher (politician) (born 1985), British former Member of Parliament for Bolsover
- Mark Fletcher Jr. (born 2004), American college football player
