= Marjorie Lee Browne =

American mathematician and educator (1914–1979)

- Born: September 9, 1914; Memphis, Tennessee
- Died: October 19, 1979 (aged 65); Durham, North Carolina
- Education: Howard University (BS); University of Michigan (PhD)

Marjorie Lee Browne (September 9, 1914 – October 19, 1979) was a mathematics educator. She was one of the first African-American women to receive a PhD in mathematics.

== Early life and education ==
Marjorie Lee Browne was the daughter of Mary Taylor Lee and Lawrence Johnson Lee, but was raised by her father and Lottie Lee, because her mother passed away when she was two years old. Her father was talented at mental arithmetic and had also completed two years of college, which was rare at the time.

She attended Howard University, majoring in mathematics and graduating cum laude in 1935. After receiving her bachelor's degree, she taught high school and college for a short term, including at Gilbert Academy in New Orleans.

She then applied to the University of Michigan graduate program in mathematics. Michigan accepted African Americans, while many other US educational institutions did not at the time. After working full-time at the historically black Wiley College in Marshall, Texas, and attending Michigan only during the summer, Browne's work paid off and she received a teaching fellowship at Michigan, attending full-time and completing her dissertation in 1949. Her dissertation, "Studies of One Parameter Subgroups of Certain Topological and Matrix Groups," was supervised by George Yuri Rainich. She was one of the first African-American women in the US to earn a doctorate in mathematics, along with Evelyn Boyd Granville, who also earned a Ph.D. in 1949. Euphemia Haynes was the very first African-American woman in the US to earn a doctorate in mathematics, having earned hers in 1943.

== Later life and career ==
After receiving her doctorate, Browne was unable to keep a teaching position at a research institution. As a result of this, she worked with secondary school mathematics teachers, instructing them in "modern math". She focused especially on encouraging math education for minorities and women.

Browne then joined the faculty at North Carolina College (now North Carolina Central University (NCCU)), where she taught and researched for thirty years. She was also the head of the department for much of her time at NCCU, from 1951 to 1970. There she worked as principal investigator, coordinator of the mathematics section, and lecturer for the Summer Institute for Secondary School Science and Mathematics Teachers.

Marjorie Lee Browne died of a heart attack in Durham, North Carolina, on October 19, 1979. After her death, four of her students established the Marjorie Lee Brown Trust Fund at North Carolina Central University which sponsors the Marjorie Lee Browne Scholarship and the Marjorie Lee Browne Distinguished Alumni Lecture Series. Since 1999, the Mathematics Department at the University of Michigan has hosted the Marjorie Lee Browne Colloquium, which annually brings a speaker "to present a talk that highlights their research but also addresses the issue of diversity in the sciences."

== Contributions ==
Browne's work on classical groups demonstrated simple proofs of important topological properties of and relations between classical groups. Her work in general focused on linear and matrix algebra.

Browne saw the importance of computer science early on, writing a $60,000 grant to IBM to bring a computer to NCCU in 1960—one of the first computers in academic computing, and probably the first at a historically black school.

Throughout her career, Browne worked to help gifted mathematics students, educating them and offering them financial support to pursue higher education. Notable students included Joseph Battle, William Fletcher, Asamoah Nkwanta, and Nathan Simms. She established summer institutes to provide continuing education in mathematics for high school teachers. In 1974 she was awarded the first W. W. Rankin Memorial Award from the North Carolina Council of Teachers of Mathematics for her work with mathematics education.

She was a member of the Women's Research Society, American Mathematical Society, Mathematical Association of America, and the International Congress of Mathematicians.

== Publications ==
- "A note on the classical groups", Amer. Math. Monthly 62 (1955), 424–27.

=== Mathematics education works ===
- Sets, Logic, and Mathematical Thought (1957)
- Introduction to Linear Algebra (1959)
- Elementary Matrix Algebra (1969)
- Algebraic Structures (1974)

== Awards and honors ==
While discrimination against African Americans and women was significant during Browne's early career, she was recognized for her achievements in education and mathematics.

- Elected to Sigma Xi, 1948
- University of Michigan nominee, American Mathematical Society
- Ford Foundation fellowship to study combinatorial topology at Cambridge University
- National Science Foundation Faculty Fellow studying computing and numerical analysis at UCLA
- Fellowship to study differential topology at Columbia University, 1965–66
- First recipient of W. W. Rankin Memorial Award for Excellence in Mathematics Education, given by the North Carolina Council of Teachers in Mathematics, which lauded her for "helping to pave the way for integrated organizations".
- The University of Michigan Department of Mathematics established the Dr. Marjorie Lee Browne Colloquium in 1999. The colloquium is presented each year during the University of Michigan's Martin Luther King Day activities.
- Marjorie Lee Browne Scholarship, which offers full scholarships to students majoring in math at NCCU.
