= Lega Zambelli =

Antonio Lega Zambelli (c. 1770—1847) was segretario or private secretary to Lord Byron from 1819 to 1824, when Byron died.

== Life ==
Zambelli was born in 1770 at Brisighella, in the province of Ravenna, and was educated for the priesthood. He entered the service of Count Guiccioli around 1815. It was Guiccioli's young wife Teresa, Contessa Guiccioli (née Gamba), who became Byron's last (female) long-standing lover. Also in the Guiccioli household was Francesca Silvestrini, the family governess who became Teresa's personal friend.

Lega Zambelli died in the shared house of his daughter and son-in-law, in 1847.

== Legacy ==
Doris Langley-Moore used the Zambelli papers as the basis of her book, Lord Byron Accounts Rendered.

== Family ==
Fanny Silvestrini bore Zambelli two children, but only Aspasia Zambelli (1817-1890) survived.

Aspasia married William Fletcher's son, William Frederick, in 1838. Their daughter, Clelia Mary, styled herself as Clelia Lega-Weekes after her marriage. Her daughter, Ethel Lega-Weekes (1864-1949) donated many family papers to the British Library, including Lega Zambelli's papers. In this multi-volumed set are many interesting documents relating to Byron's last five years.
