= Peter Fletcher =

Peter Fletcher may refer to:

- Peter Fletcher (footballer) (born 1953), English footballer
- Peter G. Fletcher (1936–1996), British orchestral and choral conductor
- Peter Fletcher (RAF officer) (1916–1999), Royal Air Force officer
