= Judge Fletcher =

Judge Fletcher may refer to:

- Betty Binns Fletcher (1923–2012), judge of the United States Court of Appeals for the Ninth Circuit
- Lloyd Fletcher (1915–1991), judge of the United States Court of Federal Claims
- William A. Fletcher (born 1945), judge of the United States Court of Appeals for the Ninth Circuit

== See also ==
- Justice Fletcher (disambiguation)
