= Adam Fletcher =

Adam Fletcher may refer to:

- Adam F.C. Fletcher (born 1975), author, activist and educator
- Adam Fletcher (rugby league) (born 1983), rugby league player
