= Simon Fletcher =

Simon Fletcher may refer to:

- Simon Fletcher (American football) (born 1962), American football linebacker
- Simon Fletcher (artist), English artist
- Simon Fletcher (Australian footballer) (born 1978), Australian rules footballer
- Simon Fletcher (music manager) (born 1964), British music manager
- Simon Fletcher (political advisor), London based
