= George Henry Abbott =

Australian surgeon (1867–1942)

- Born: 1867; Sydney, Australia
- Died: 7 November 1942 (aged 74–75); Chatswood, Sydney
- Education: Newington College; University of Sydney
- Occupation: Surgeon
- Father: Joseph Abbott

George Henry Abbott (1867–1942) was an Australian surgeon, President of the New South Wales branch of the British Medical Association, President of the Royal Australian Historical Society and a fellow of the University of Sydney Senate.

== Biography ==
=== Early life ===
Abbott was the son of Joseph Abbott, wool-broker and politician, and Margaret Ann Bennett. He was one of six sons and three daughters. At birth his family lived in Glebe before moving to Newtown where his father was an alderman. Around 1880 the family moved to the newly fashionable suburb of Croydon. Abbott was educated at Newington College (1881–1884) and graduated in arts and medicine from the University of Sydney.

=== Medical career ===
Abbott practiced as a surgeon in Macquarie Street, Sydney and lectured in clinical surgery at Royal Prince Alfred Hospital from 1911 to 1927. On the foundation of the Royal Australian College of Surgeons he was appointed as a Fellow. For many years, Abbott served as a councillor of the New South Wales branch of the British Medical Association and then was elected president.

=== Community involvement ===
He was a keen numismatist and served as President of the Royal Australian Historical Society from 1934 to 1936 and as a Fellow of the Sydney University Senate from 1919 to 1929. Abbott served as President of the Old Newingtonians' Union in 1901.

Awards
Preceded by Cecil Purser	Schofield Scholarship; Dux of Newington College; 1882	Succeeded by Norman Fletcher
