= Justice Fletcher =

Justice Fletcher may refer to:

- Norman S. Fletcher (born 1934), associate justice and chief justice of the Supreme Court of Georgia
- Richard Fletcher (American politician) (1788–1869), associate justice of the Massachusetts Supreme Judicial Court
- Robert Virgil Fletcher (1869–1960), associate justice of the Supreme Court of Mississippi
- William A. Fletcher (Michigan judge) (1788–1852), chief justice of Michigan Supreme Court

== See also ==
- Judge Fletcher (disambiguation)
