= Chip Fletcher =

Climate scientist and geologist in Hawaii

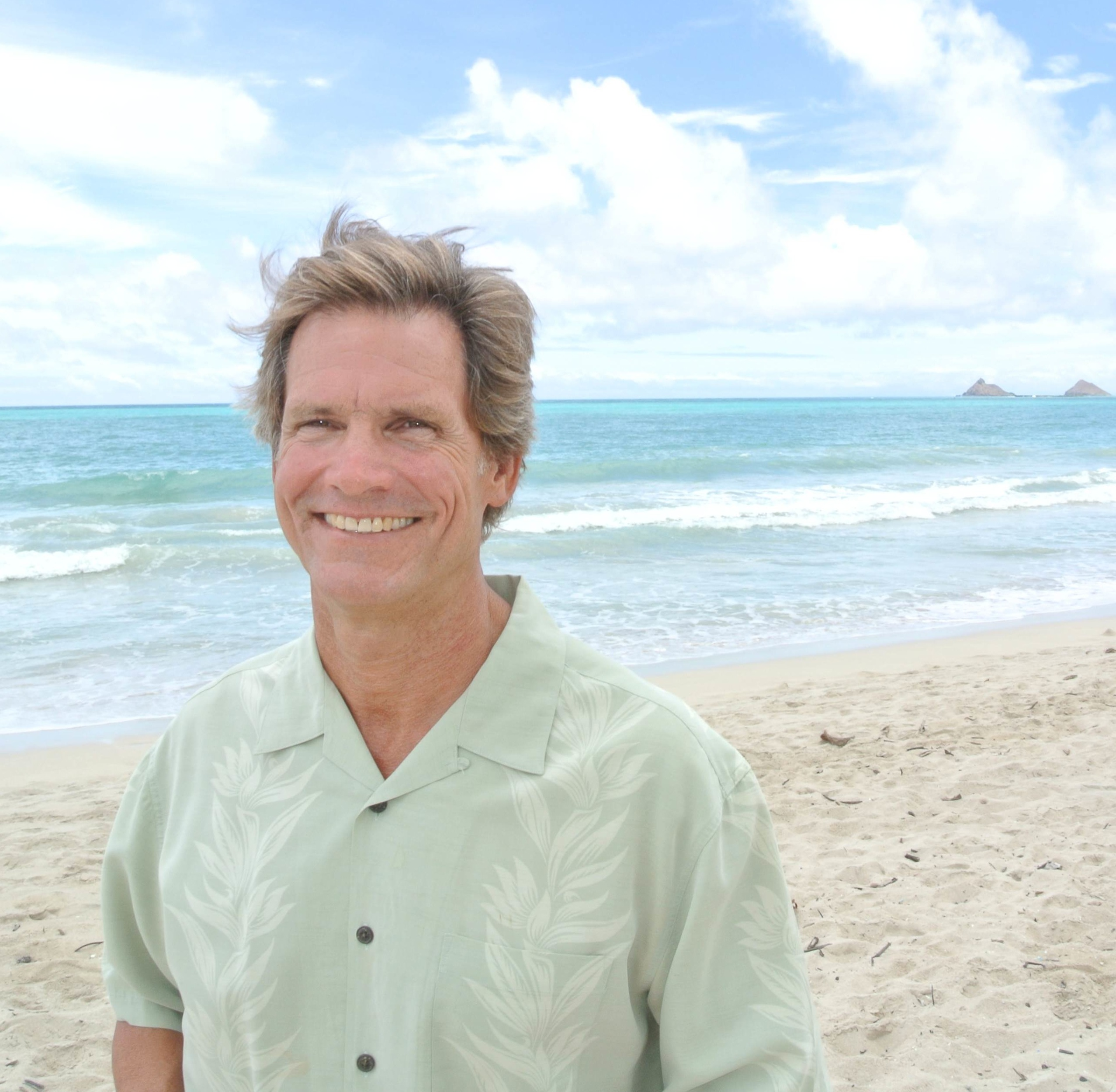
- Fletcher in 2024
- Born: Charles H. Fletcher III
- Occupation: Climate scientist
- Scientific career
- Workplaces: University of Hawaiʻi at Mānoa

Charles H. Fletcher III is an American climate scientist and geologist. He studies sea level rise and shoreline change with a particular focus on how climate change will affect communities in the Pacific Islands. In addition to his research, Fletcher advocates for human adaptation to sea level rise.

Fletcher is currently the Dean of the School of Ocean and Earth Science and Technology (SOEST) at the University of Hawaiʻi at Mānoa, and former Chairperson of the Honolulu Climate Change Commission. His research team, specializing in modeling the components of sea level rise impacts and posting them on a publicly available viewer, is named the Coastal Research Collaborative (CRC).

== Career ==
=== University of Hawai'i ===
In 1991, Fletcher joined the Department of Earth Sciences (then called the Department of Geology and Geophysics) at the School of Ocean and Earth Science and Technology (SOEST) at the University of Hawaiʻi at Mānoa. He was promoted to professor in 1998, and chaired the department for two terms before 2010, when he became SOEST associate dean for academic affairs. On January 1, 2022, Fletcher was named Interim Dean of SOEST.

=== Advocacy and public engagement ===
In July 2018, Fletcher spoke at a climate change conference on Majuro, the capital of the Marshall Islands. He presented on possible methods for adapting to climate change, describing a possible future scenario in which present-day Majuro is submerged in 3 feet (0.91 m) of water and recommending an approach of dredging and creating an area of land elevated enough to be safe. While noting that this approach would be expensive and environmentally disruptive, he stated that "I would rather destroy some reef than see an entire culture go extinct."

=== Research and contributions ===
Fletcher's research primarily examines the effects of climate change on Pacific Islands, with a focus on sea level rise and coastal erosion. His studies on the implications of rising sea levels have informed models predicting future impacts on coastal regions, particularly in Hawaii.

In October 2018, Fletcher and a team of researchers were in the process of studying East Island, one of the Northwestern Hawaiian Islands when it was destroyed in a storm surge caused by Hurricane Walaka. Fletcher had predicted that the island would be fully inundated by sea level rise within 10 to 30 years, but expressed disappointment that it was gone so soon, describing the event as "a huge blow" to both his research and the species (including the critically endangered Hawaiian monk seal and threatened green sea turtle) that inhabited the island. While the hurricane may have been coincidental, it was abnormally far north, and Fletcher noted that a strong hurricane on this path "is made more probable under the conditions of climate change [and] global warming". He described East Island as a "proxy" for countries on similar low-lying atolls, including the Marshall Islands, the Maldives, Tuvalu and Kiribati, and stated that the destruction of East Island demonstrated the risk to these nations.

=== Climate change advocacy ===
Fletcher attended the 2021 United Nations Climate Change Conference as part of a University of Hawaiʻi delegation. He later criticized the exclusivity of the conference and the compromise-based nature of the negotiation process, describing it as fundamentally flawed.

=== Publications and contributions ===
With his students, Fletcher has published more than 100 peer-reviewed articles, in addition to 3 textbooks. He tracks beach erosion in Hawaii, and simulates the effect that various sea level rise scenarios would have on the Hawaiian Islands. Data published by Fletcher's team are used in Hawaii for coastal infrastructure planning, including by the City and County of Honolulu, Kauaʻi County and Maui County for setback ordinances. Hawaii Senate Bill 474, the first seller disclosure law related to sea level rise in the United States, was based on data produced by his research team. Act 16 (SLH 2020) mandated significant changes to the Coastal Zone Management law of Hawaii based on his research: The state-wide setback increased based on CRC historic erosion rates; Sea level rise is assessed in all shoreline and special management area (SMA) permits, even for parcels that are not oceanfront; The use of seawalls and revetments on sites with beaches is prohibited unless clearly in the public interest. HB243 requires state agencies to identify facilities exposed to sea level rise and publish plans for adaptation to flooding. Fletcher additionally chairs the Honolulu Climate Change Commission.

Fletcher's recent work is focused on five global issues: climate change, biodiversity loss, pollution, disease, and social inequality. His paper "Earth at risk: An urgent call to end the age of destruction and forge a just and sustainable future" was published in the journal Proceedings of the National Academy of Sciences-NEXUS.

His shoreline advocacy work is grounded in peer-reviewed research in collaboration with his nearly 40 graduate students. Notable works include "Modeling multiple sea level rise stresses reveals up to twice the land at risk compared to strictly passive flooding methods"; "Failure to protect beaches under slowly rising sea level"; "Assessment of groundwater inundation by sea level rise"; "The influence of sea level rise on coastal groundwater and the convergence of impacts on municipal infrastructure"; and "Rethinking reef island stability in relation to anthropogenic sea level rise"

=== Adaptation to sea level rise ===
Fletcher is an advocate for various methods of adaptation to sea level rise, which he describes as "an unsolvable problem that needs to be managed so we can decrease the amount of loss and suffering and damage that we experience". He has critiqued seawalls for their contribution to beach erosion, and advocated for an "exit strategy" in which coastal homeowners would be incentivized to move inland rather than attempting to maintain their coastal properties. He has additionally noted that the effect of climate change on the Pacific Islands is drastically larger than their historical contribution to climate change, and stated that the "major industrial nations responsible for global warming have a debt to the Pacific islands to assist with the adaptation that is necessary to survive this challenge".

== Accolades ==
Fletcher is a Geological Society of America Fellow. In 2010, Fletcher was awarded the Environmental Merit Award in Hawaii by the United States Environmental Protection Agency. The award recognized Fletcher's work with the Center for Island Climate Adaptation and Policy at the University of Hawaiʻi, and the EPA stated that "Dr. Chip Fletcher not only studies island climate adaptation and policy issues, but he also excels at communicating his findings to policy makers and the public". He received the Community Service Award from ThinkTech Hawaii in 2019 for his efforts to communicate the societal impacts of climate change. In 2023, he was presented the 2023 Climate Adaptation Leadership Award for Natural Resources alongside Assistant Professor Haunani Kane for their work in reducing climate-related threats and promoting adaptation strategies.

== Authored books ==
- Fletcher, Charles H.; Boyd, Robynne; Neal, William J.; Tice, Virginia (2011). Living on the Shores of Hawaii: Natural Hazards, the Environment, and Our Communities. Honolulu: University of Hawaii Press. ISBN 978-0-8248-6090-5. OCLC 875895394.
- *Fletcher, Charles H.; Eversole, Dolan; Rooney, John J.; Gibbs, Ann. (2012). National Assessment of Shoreline Change (NASC): Historical Shoreline Change in the Hawaiian Islands. US Geological Survey. ISBN 9781411333819.
- Fletcher, Charles H. The Physical Earth. Multiple editions. Wiley.
- Fletcher, Charles H. (2014). Introduction to Physical Geology, Canadian Edition. Wiley. ISBN 9781118300824.
- Fletcher, Charles H. (2017). Physical Geology: The Science of Earth. Wiley. ISBN 978-1-119-62657-2.
- Fletcher, Charles H. (2019). Climate Change: What The Science Tells Us. Wiley. ISBN 978-1-119-44141-0. OCLC 1048028378.

== Personal life ==
Fletcher resides in Honolulu, Hawaii, where he continues his work as a scientist, educator, and advocate for climate adaptation. He is also active on social media, where he is seen sharing insights on climate readiness and environmental justice.

== See also ==
- Effects of climate change on small island countries
