= Barry Fletcher =

English cricketer

Barry Elyston Fletcher (born 7 March 1935) is a former cricketer who played first-class cricket for Warwickshire in 49 matches between 1956 and 1961. He was born in Birmingham.

Fletcher was a left-handed middle-order batsman, a very occasional right-arm medium pace bowler and he also kept wicket a few times. Primarily a second eleven player in the Minor Counties and Second Eleven Championship he made occasional first-team appearances for Warwickshire from 1956, mostly in the less important games against the universities, Scotland and the Combined Services until a century in the match against Oxford University in 1960 led to a more extended run in the first team. His 16 matches in 1960 gave him an aggregate of 446 runs at an average of 26.23 and a similar extended run in the team in 1961 brought 581 runs at 24.20, with four scores of more than 50 but no further centuries. But these figures were not enough to earn him a new contract and he left full-time cricket at the end of the 1961 season.
