= Robert Fletcher (North Carolina politician) =

North Carolina reconstruction era American politician

North Carolina House of Representatives
- In office 1870–1874

Personal details
- Born: 1815 North Carolina
- Died: September 1885 (aged 69–70)
- Party: Republican

Robert Fletcher (1815 – September 1885) was a Reconstruction era politician in North Carolina who served in the North Carolina House of Representatives. He served his community in other positions including being a sub-elector and a county commissioner.

== Biography ==
Fletcher was born in 1815 in North Carolina and was an African American of Congo descent and described as literate.

He was elected in April 1868 to serve as commissioner for Richmond County. Later that year in October he was appointed as a Republican sub-elector for the county. He served on the Pitt County Board of Assessors in 1869 and then as the Richmond County commissioner the following year in 1870.

A convention of the Richmond County Republicans in July 1870 nominated Fletcher to run for the house. H. S. Wade stood as an independent Radical against him. Before the election it was reported that Fletcher was in favor of impeaching governor William Woods Holden. Fletcher was elected to serve in the North Carolina House of Representatives in September 1870. At the start of 1872 he co-signed a letter by governor Tod Robinson Caldwell printed in the newspapers to discourage the Colored people of North Carolina from being tempted by offers of work in other states. He was re-elected in 1872 but failed reelection when he stood for the final time in 1874. He kept involved in politics including attending the Richmond County Republican Conventions and giving a speech at the 1876 event.

Fletcher died on September 1 or September 2, 1885 following an illness.

== See also ==
- African American officeholders from the end of the Civil War until before 1900
