= Jan Fletcher =

Jan Fletcher OBE is an entrepreneur who lives in the United Kingdom. She has built up and run businesses in several sectors, and is currently focused on international property investment and development, natural health products, nutraceuticals and restaurants.

Her portfolio of interests has included haulage, commercial vehicle sales, car dealerships and has built the group to 15 before selling over a period of time. She has also invested in accident repair centres, publishing, radio stations and pharmaceuticals.

In 2013, Fletcher's company Montpellier Estates was ordered to pay £2 million in legal costs after losing a lawsuit against Leeds City Council over contractual dispute for the construction of Leeds Arena.

In 2021, Fletcher's Bee Health, a UK manufacturer of nutritional supplements, was acquired by US-based company INW for an undisclosed amount.

== Awards and recognition ==
- 1994, Veuve Clicquot Business Woman of the Year
- 1995, Yorkshire Woman of the Year
- 1997, Officer of the Order of the British Empire (OBE) for Services to Industry in 1997
- Founding Chairman of Marketing Leeds, in 2004-2008
- 2009, awarded an honorary degree by the University of Bradford
