= Christopher Fletcher =

English cricketer

Christopher Fletcher (born 10 December 1957) was an English cricketer. He was a left-handed batsman and a right-arm medium-fast bowler who played for Sussex. He was born in Harrogate.

Despite having a four-year-long career with the Second XI, from 1978, Fletcher appeared in just a single first-class match, against Oxford University. As a tailender, Fletcher did not bat during the match, but bowled 19 overs, taking one wicket.
