= Seller disclosure statement =

In the United States, a seller disclosure statement is a form disclosing the seller's knowledge of the condition of the property. The seller disclosure notice or statement is anecdotal and does not serve as a substitute for any inspections or warranties the purchaser may wish to obtain. It also does not serve as a warranty of any kind. Misrepresentation in the statement may result in liability.

Some states mandate the use of standardized forms that must be completed by the seller with questions about specific property condition issues and the seller's knowledge of them. States that do not impose this requirement typically require very little disclosure by sellers, although sellers generally cannot lie or conceal issues with the property.

Seller disclosure statements are not compulsory in New Mexico as well as in certain other states.

== See also ==
- Caveat emptor
