= Henry Fletcher (cricketer) =

English cricketer

Personal information
- Born: 25 July 1882; Clay Cross, Derbyshire, England
- Died: 27 October 1937 (aged 55); Chaddesden, Derbyshire, England

Domestic team information
- Years: Team
- 1907–1908: Derbyshire
- FC debut: 10 June 1907 Derbyshire v Sussex
- Last FC: 2 July 1908 Derbyshire v Kent

Career statistics
Competition	First-class
Matches	5
Runs scored	17
Batting average	2.12
100s/50s	0/0
Top score	4
Catches/stumpings	2/–
- Source: CricketArchive, July 2012

Henry Fletcher (25 July 1882 — 27 October 1937) was an English cricketer who played for Derbyshire between 1907 and 1908.

Fletcher was born in Clay Cross, Derbyshire. He made his debut in a match against Sussex in 1907, and played in two further games during the 1907 season. He played two games in the 1908 season, his final game coming against Kent. Overall, he played 10 innings in 5 first-class matches, with a top score of 4.

Fletcher died in Chaddesden, Derbyshire at the age of 55.

Another Derbyshire cricketer, Thomas Fletcher, played for Derbyshire in 1906, though it is unclear as to whether the two were related. He is related to Hannah Fletcher, an English author.
