= William Fletcher (valet) =

Valet of Lord Byron (c. 1773 – 1839)

William Fletcher (c. 1775–1839), Lord Byron's valet, was often the butt of humour by his famous master.

== Life ==
Fletcher was born sometime in the mid-1770s in Southwell. His parents' names are not known, but a Byron letter of January 1809 noted his valet's father had died and left some property. A Southwell farmer called Richard Fletcher was buried on 14 January and might have been he. A William Fletcher, a "servingman", had married "spinster" Sarah Bye "both of Southwell" on 23 July 1804 at Southwell Minster. At Southwell, the Fletchers had a son, William, in March 1805, but he died as a baby the following July. A second son, George, was born in May 1806.

Fletcher served the Byron family from about 1804, at first as a footman and groom. Around October 1806, Byron's valet Frank Boyce was sacked and later tried and transported for theft. Fletcher became Byron's valet soon after that and remained so until the poet's death in 1824. A third child, William, later William Frederick, was born in late June 1809, just as Fletcher was about to travel to Europe and the East with Byron and John Cam Hobhouse. Byron eventually sent Fletcher home to England, after many tribulations, near the end of 1810. Widowed a few years later, Fletcher married Anne Rood, who was also Lady Byron's maid, in January 1816. Fletcher joined Byron in exile in Europe following the marriage scandal, leaving behind his newly wedded wife to cope with two motherless sons. He was at Byron's bedside constantly during the poet's last illness and accompanied the body to England.

Byron almost certainly meant to leave his valet a generous annuity. As any will he had made abroad was not found, an earlier will was proved which left Fletcher no pension. Fletcher and Lega Zambelli, Byron's Italian secretary, tried to set up a macaroni manufacturing business in London, but it seems to have failed around the mid-1830s when the government lifted the duty on importing Italian spaghetti. Zambelli continued the business by importing Italian comestibles and the enterprise eventually passed to Fletcher's son. who married Zambelli's daughter. Fletcher had to rely on the impecunious Augusta Leigh for funds but she was forced to stop his allowance in 1838 and his decline and death seem to have followed rapidly. Byron biographer Doris Langley-Moore claimed that Fletcher lived into his 80s, but Byron scholar Ralph Lloyd-Jones has discovered a newspaper report that Fletcher died in 1839. Shortly before his death, Fletcher was interviewed by the author Jane Roberts, with a view to writing his biography, or to ghosting an autobiography, but the project was never undertaken; Roberts also tried to obtain the position of Collector of the Royal Free Hospital for Fletcher, without success.
