= Thomas Fletcher (rugby league, born 2004) =

Australian rugby league footballer

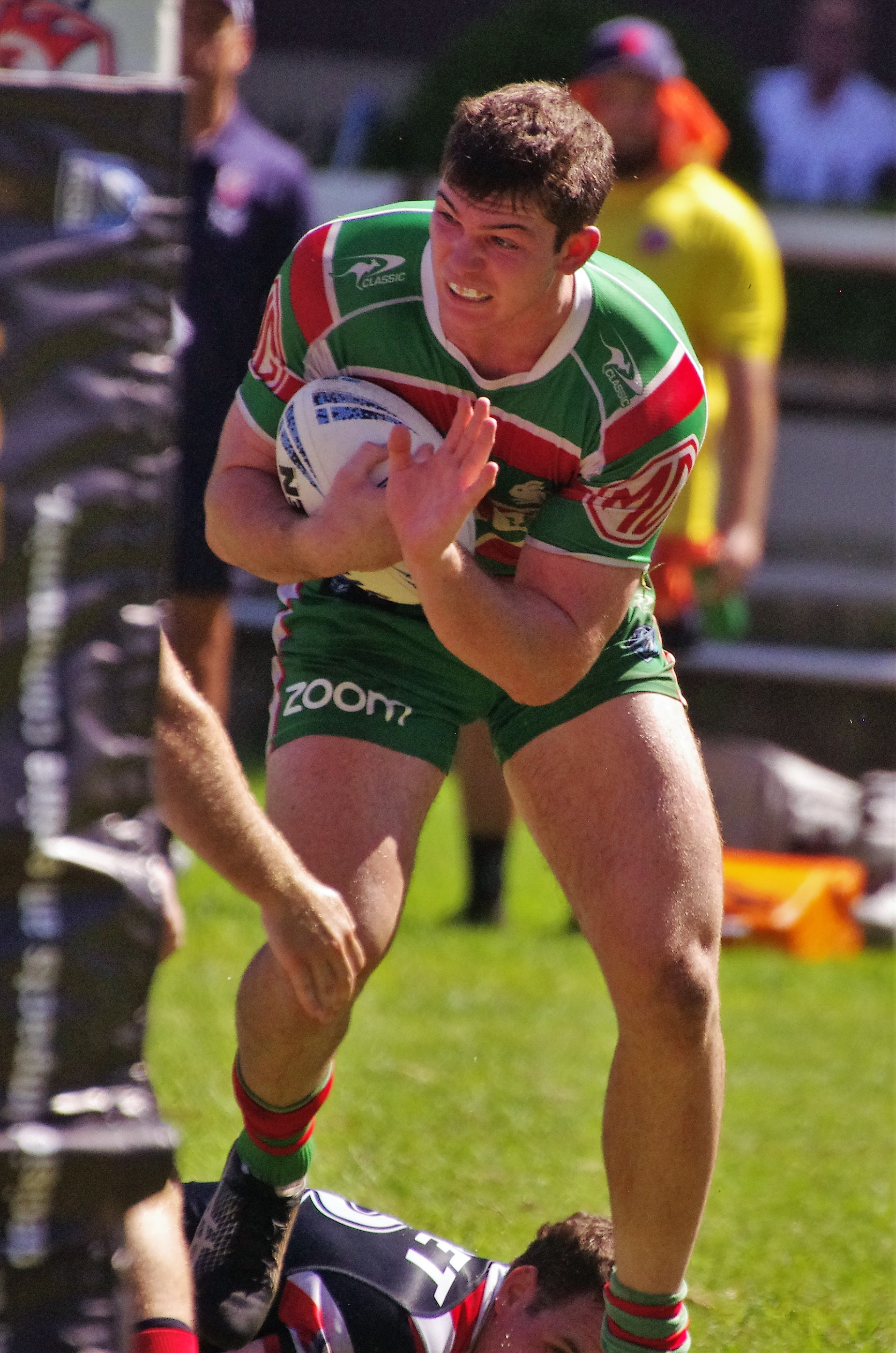

Personal information
- Full name: Thomas Fletcher
- Born: 6 January 2004 (age 22) Coonamble, New South Wales, Australia
- Height: 190 cm (6 ft 3 in)
- Weight: 98 kg (15 st 6 lb)

Playing information
- Position: Second-row
Club
Years	Team	Pld	T	G	FG	P
2025–26	South Sydney	7	1	0	0	4
2027–	New Zealand Warriors	0	0	0	0	0
	Total	7	1	0	0	4
- Source: As of 22 November 2026

Thomas Fletcher (born 6 January 2004) is an Australian professional rugby league footballer who plays as a second-row forward for the New Zealand Warriors in the National Rugby League (NRL).

== Background ==
Fletcher was born in Coonamble, New South Wales. He attended St. Gregory's College in Campbelltown. He was scouted during Year 11 and entered the Rabbitohs' pathways system. Fletcher plays primarily in the second-row and developed through the club’s top pathways.

== Playing career ==
=== NSW Cup ===
Fletcher debuted for South Sydney in round 3 of 2024 NSW Cup against arch-rivals the Sydney Roosters, eventually tallying 16 appearances and scoring 3 tries across the 2024–25 seasons. He recorded five tries and made 1,443 running metres in 2025, maintaining a tackle efficiency over 94%.

=== NRL ===
Fletcher earned his first-grade debut in round 22 of the 2025 NRL season, coming off the bench in South Sydney's match against the Brisbane Broncos at Suncorp Stadium. He had been named as 18th man on multiple occasions before finally taking the field in round 22.

On 11 November 2026, the New Zealand Warriors announced that they had signed Fletcher on a three year deal.
