= Charles Fletcher (composer) =

American composer

- Born: August 26, 1884; Kirkwood, Illinois, United States
- Died: May 2, 1965 (aged 80); Los Angeles, California, United States
- Occupation: Composer

Charles Fletcher (August 26, 1884 – May 2, 1965) was an American composer. His work was part of the music event in the art competition at the 1932 Summer Olympics.
