= William Whigham Fletcher =

Scottish biologist

William Whigham Fletcher FRSE FLS (11 August 1918 – 4 April 2001) was a Scottish biologist and academic author. He was Professor of Botany at Strathclyde University. He specialised in crop protection and was one of the first to study the environmental impact of herbicides.

== Life ==
Fletcher was born on 11 September 1918.

He was brought up in Airdrie, North Lanarkshire and was both school captain and dux of Airdrie Academy. In 1937 he went to Glasgow University to study Botany. As with many his studies were interrupted by the Second World War. He saw the war coming and joined the Territorial Army in the summer of 1939. Due to this he was immediately mobilised at the outbreak of war and served in first the Royal Army Ordnance Corps and then the Royal Army Medical Corps, serving in Egypt, Libya, Lebanon, Italy, Syria and Greece.

He resumed his studies in 1945 and graduated in 1947. He then did postgraduate studies at both Glasgow University under Prof Carl Browning, University of Łódź in central Poland and Cornell University in USA, gaining his doctorate (PhD). In 1952 he was appointed Head of Botany at the West of Scotland Agricultural College and in 1962 became Senior Lecturer at Glasgow's Royal College of Science and Technology (later renamed Strathclyde University). In 1966 he became their first Professor of Botany.

In 1967 he was elected a Fellow of the Royal Society of Edinburgh. His proposers were John Hawthorn, Peter Pauson, Donald Pack and Patrick Dunbar Ritchie. He served as the Society's Vice President 1983 to 1986.

He died on 4 April 2001.

== Publications ==
- The Pest War (1974)
- Flowers of Glasgow
- Poisonous Plants of South-West Scotland
- The Flora of Great Cumbrae Island
- Herbicides and Plant Growth Regulators
- Bracken and its Control
- Modern Man Looks at Evolution (1974)
- Energy Resources and the Environment (1976)
- Food, Agriculture and the Environment (1976)
- Health and the Environment (1976)
- Reclamation (1976)
- Marine Environment (1977)
- Built Environment (1978)
- Chemical Environment (1978)
- Economics of the Environment (1979)
- Biological Environment (1979)
