= William Thomas Fletcher =

American mathematician

William Thomas Fletcher is an American mathematician.

== Education ==
He received the B.S.(magna cum laude) and M.S. degrees (major in mathematics) from North Carolina Central University (NCCU), Durham, NC in 1956 and 1958 respectively. He received the Ph.D. degree in mathematics from the University of Idaho in 1966.

== Early career ==
In 1957 Dr. Fletcher accepted his first teaching position in the department of mathematics at LeMoyne-Owen College, Memphis, Tennessee, where he served as chairman until 1972. For the ten-year period 1962–72 Fletcher pursued summer employment as a mathematical applications computer programmer in industry, business, and government at IBM Mohansic Laboratory (Yorktown Heights, NY), Western Electric (Hopewell, NJ), the Lawrence Livermore Laboratory (Livermore, CA), and the US Departments of Commerce (Washington, DC), Agriculture (St. Paul, Minn), and Energy (Livermore, CA).

== NCCU ==
In 1972 Fletcher returned to NCCU as professor and chairman of the mathematics department where he joined his former teacher and mentor, Marjorie Lee Browne, the second African-American woman to earn a Ph.D. in Mathematics. During his 25-year tenure at NCCU, Fletcher instituted a BS degree in computer science; wrote petition to obtain a chapter of Pi Mu Epsilon, honorary national mathematics society promoting scholarly activity in mathematics, organized the Marjorie Lee Browne Distinguished Alumni Lectures Series; developed, with two other alumni the Marjorie Lee Browne Memorial Scholarship; led several summer institutes for science and math teachers; organized a Department Speaker Bureau; developed, with other department members, the Mathematics Department Resource Learning Center;and was the principal writer of a proposal to establish a chapter of Sigma Xi at NCCU.

== Professional memberships and awards ==
He held membership in several professional organizations; served on several boards including the North Carolina State Board of Science and Technology; received several awards including outstanding teacher of the year (1990); the Year 2000 NC State Award in Science, the highest award that the Governor of NC can bestow upon a citizen. He was the recipient of the 2005 Durham County and North Carolina State Jaycees awards for outstanding community service.

== Publications ==
- "On the Decomposition of Associative Algebras of Prime Characteristic", Journal of Algebra, Vol. 16, No. 2, 1970, pp. 227–236.
- "On Whitehead's Second Lemma for Lie Algebras", International Journal of Mathematics and Mathematical Sciences, Vol. 29, No. 3, 1982, pp. 521–523.
- "On the Structure of Associative Algebras Relative to Their Radicals", Rev. Roumaine Math. Pures Appl., Vol. 29, Vol. 4, 1984, pp. 301–307.
- "Implementing the Recommendation of CUPM in A Small Mathematics Department", Newsletter, CUPM; The Mathematical Association of America, 1970.
- "The Nature of Mathematics and Its Importance in a Liberal Education", The Mathematics Newsletter, Vol. VII, No. 2, University of Idaho, 1965.
- "The Mathematics Learning Center", Proceedings of the ICMI-JSME Regional Conference on Mathematics Education, 1983.
- Some Optimizations of the ANIMAL Code, Lawrence Livermore Laboratory Technical Publication; University of California, 1975.
- "Marjorie Lee Browne – A Biography", Encyclopedia of African American Culture and History, New York: Columbia University, 1994.
- "Marjorie Lee Browne – An American Mathematician", Twentieth-Century Scientists, Gale Research, Inc., Detroit, MI
