= Edward Taylor Fletcher =

Canadian author (1817–1897)

- Born: Edward Taylor Fletcher; 20 May 1817; Kent, England, UK
- Died: 1 February 1897 (aged 79); New Westminster, British Columbia, Canada
- Education: Séminaire de Québec
- Occupations: architect, surveyor
- Writing career
- Genres: poetry, memoir, and essay

Edward Taylor Fletcher (20 May 1817 – 1 February 1897) was a Canadian poet, memoirist, travel writer, essayist, land surveyor, and architect. He resided in Quebec City, Montreal, and Toronto before moving to British Columbia in his retirement, where he lived in Victoria and finally New Westminster. He was a member of the Literary and Historical Society of Quebec and also served as its librarian and secretary.

== Early life and education ==
Fletcher first arrived in Quebec on 20 October 1827, where he began attending the Reverend Daniel Wilkie's private school, and in 1832 he began studies at the Séminaire de Québec. He contracted cholera in 1832 during the 1826–1837 cholera pandemic and survived but lost his mother to the disease. On 21 October 1846, he married Henrietta Amelia Lindsay, who was the daughter of William Burns Lindsay Sr. and brother of William Burns Lindsay Jr., both of whom were clerks of the Legislative Assembly. Together, they had thirteen children, six of whom lived.

== Bibliography ==
=== Long Poems ===
- The Lost Island (Atlantis) (1887)
- Nestorius: A Phantasy (1892)

=== Memoirs ===
- "Notes of a Journey Through the Interior of the Saguenay Country" (1869)
- "Notes of a Voyage to St. Augustine, Labrador" (1882)
- "Notes from Victoria, B.C." (1890)
- "Letter on British Columbia" (1892)
- "Reminiscences of Old Quebec" (1913)

=== Non-fiction essays ===
- "Icelandic Poetry" (1844)
- "Songs of the Polish Peasantry" (1844)
- "The Twenty Years Siege of Candia" (1855)
- On Language, As Subjective and Objective (1857)
- "On Languages as Evincing Special Modes of Thought" (1861)
- "The Lost Island of Atlantis" (1865)
- "On the Secular Change of Magnetic Declination in Canada, from 1790 to 1850" (1865)
- "The Kalevala or National Epos of the Finns" (1869)
- Our Lord at Bethany (1874)
- "Map-Making in the Middle-Ages" (1878)
- "Crown Land Surveys, P.Q." (1885)

== Translations ==
- "The Kalevala" (1869), a partial translation
