= William Fletcher (physician) =

William Fletcher (born 11 October 1872 in Lemsford, Hertfordshire, died 18 September 1938) was an English medical doctor who in 1907 published the results of an experiment showing beriberi could be prevented by eating unpolished rice.

== Life ==
Fletcher was the son of the Rev. John Price Alcock Fletcher, rector of Burbage, Leicestershire, and Mary Ann Darker Banks. He was educated at Leamington College, and graduated from Gonville & Caius College, Cambridge in 1883 with a degree in natural sciences. He was granted a scholarship to St. Mary's Hospital, Paddington, where he qualified as MB BCh in 1896. He became a resident at the Metropolitan Hospital, then practiced medicine in Coventry.

He joined the Malayan Medical Service in 1903. He was posted to the State of Perak, then to the State of Selangor as district surgeon. In 1907 he joined the Institute for Medical Research at Kuala Lumpur as assistant to Dr. Henry Fraser and Dr. (Ambrose) Thomas Stanton. They demonstrated that beriberi is caused by a nutritional deficiency, where an essential nutrient (thiamine) is absent from milled rice. In 1910 he became an MD.

In 1911 he studied an outbreak of plague in Kuala Lumpur. In 1912 and 1913 he studied blackwater fever. He also studied the Wasserman and Luetin reactions in leprosy.

During the First World War, he moved to the Middle East, then to the University War Hospital in Southampton as a pathologist, with a rank as temporary captain.

In 1919 he returned to Malaya, where he advocated the use of oral quinine to treat malaria. His work on typhus in 1924 gained him an international reputation. He became director of the Institute in 1926, succeeding Sir Thomas Stanton.

Fletcher retired to London in 1927. He was a member, and later secretary, of the Colonial Medical Research Committee. From 1933 to 1935 he was vice-president of the Royal Society of Tropical Medicine and Hygiene. He was a member of the Malaria Commission of the League of Nations Health Organisation.

He became a Fellow of the Royal College of Physicians in 1933.

He married Mary Beatrice Hillman in 1915. They had one son and one daughter.
