= William Fletcher (engineer) =

William Fletcher (1848–1918) was an English writer and steam traction engine designer.

William Fletcher was a leading designer of Victorian and Edwardian steam traction engines. As of 2010 some twenty of his engines survived in preservation, including Maynarch (Wallis & Steevens, 1883); Excelsior (Clayton & Shuttleworth No 34980, 1902), Peggy (Clayton & Shuttleworth, 904) and Victoria (Davey Paxman - 1907).

Many of Fletcher's original build books and drawings are held at the Museum of English Rural Life (MERL), University of Reading, Berkshire, UK.

== Chronology ==
- 1848: Fletcher was born on 23 April 1848, at West Stockwith, Nottinghamshire.
- 1863: Apprenticeship with Marshall and Sons, Gainsborough.
- 1870: Draughtsman with Alexander and Sons, Cirencester.
- 1872: Assistant manager and chief draughtsman with Wallis & Steevens, Basingstoke.
- 1873: Married to Jessie Brown, daughter of a Baptist minister, Cirencester.
- 1874: Birth of Fletcher's 1st child; a daughter Lilian, at Basingstoke.
- 1876: Death of Fletcher's younger brother Robert, a gifted engineer, aged 22 years.
- 1877: Fletcher designed and tested Wallis & Steevens’ first steam traction engine; T250.
- 1878: Fletcher's 1st book, “Abuse of the steam jacket” is published. Works manager with Charles Burrell & Sons, Thetford. Birth of Fletcher's 2nd child; a son Conrad, at St. Nicholas Works, Thetford.
- 1880: Chief draughtsman with Marshall and Sons, Gainsborough.
- 1881: Birth of Fletcher's 3rd child; a daughter Hilda, at Gainsborough.
- 1888: Chief draughtsman with Ransomes, Sims & Jefferies, Ipswich. Fletcher re-designs all their steam traction engines and road locomotives.
- 1891: Fletcher's 2nd book, "The History and Development of Steam Locomotion on Common Roads” is published.
- 1895: Fletcher's 2nd edition of 1st book is re-printed, “The Steam Jacket Practically Considered”.
- 1897: Chief draughtsman with Clayton & Shuttleworth, Lincoln. Fletcher re-designs all their steam traction engines and road locomotives.
- 1898: Fletcher's 3rd book, “A chapter in the history of the traction engine” is published. Fletcher becomes a member of the Institution of Mechanical Engineers.
- 1900: Fletcher's article on the “Evolution of the Portable Engine” is published.
- 1904: Fletcher's 4th book, “English and American Steam Carriages and Traction Engines” is published.
- 1906: Chief draughtsman with Davey Paxman, Colchester. Fletcher designs all their steam traction engines.
- 1910: Fletcher retires from active traction and road engine design, aged sixty-two.
- 1911: Fletcher's article on the “Evolution of the Geared Locomotive” is published.
- 1918: William Fletcher dies at Cromer, Norfolk, on 22 December 1918, aged 70 years.
