= Thomas Fletcher (poet) =

English poet and priest (1666–1713)

- Born: 1666
- Died: 1713 (aged 46–47)
- Education: New College, Oxford
- Occupations: Poet, priest of the Church of England

Thomas Fletcher (1666–1713) was a minor English poet and priest of the Church of England.

== Early life and education ==
He was born in Avington, Hampshire, received his B.A., M.A., and D.D. from New College, Oxford. He received the doctorate in 1707. He was the parish priest for Fairfield Somerset in 1694 and moved on to be the prebendary in Wells Cathedral from 1696 until his death. He became a fellow of Winchester College in 1711 and was buried in Westminster Cathedral upon his death at age 47.

== Career ==
His sole contribution to English letters was an eight-volume Poems on several occasions and translations, wherein the first and second books of Virgil's 'AEneis' are attempted in 1692. The collection contained mostly juvenalia, its dedication said, and a good number of school exercises. His translation of the first book of Aeneid was in heroic couplets, while part of the translation of book 2 was in blank verse. The volumes also contained a partial translation of Boethius's Consolation of Philosophy and the second epode of Horace.
