= Thomas Fletcher (Canadian politician) =

Canadian politician and farmer

Thomas Fletcher (1852 – March 7, 1901) was a farmer and political figure in British Columbia. He represented Alberni in the Legislative Assembly of British Columbia from 1890 until his retirement at the 1894 provincial election.

He was born in Simcoe County, Canada West, the son of the Reverend Canon Fletcher.
