= William John Bainbrigge Fletcher =

British diplomat (1879–1933)

William John Bainbrigge Fletcher (1879-10 November 1933) was a British consul at Hoihow (Haikou) and the author of books on Chinese poetry such as Gems of Chinese Verse and More gems of Chinese poetry (1918, reprinted 1933).

He is buried at Hong Kong Cemetery.
