= John Fletcher (businessman) =

Australian businessman (born 1951)

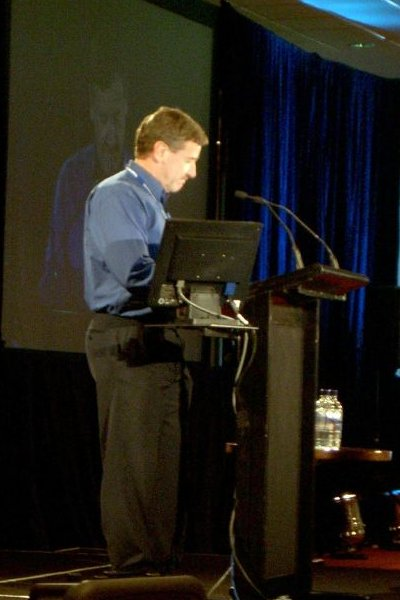
John Fletcher in 2005

John Edward Fletcher (born 5 April 1951) is an Australian businessman. He is the former CEO of Coles Myer, the biggest retailer in Australia.

Prior to Coles Myer, Fletcher was CEO of Brambles Industries, after a long career with them spanning 19 years, initially in an accounting role, and later in general management. His lack of retailing experience was criticised by some, citing Fletcher's admission that he "hadn't set foot in a supermarket for 25 years". He has also been a non-executive director on the board of Telstra.

Since 2013, he has been chairman of tyre recycling start-up Green Distillation Technologies.

Fletcher is a Fellow of CPA Australia.
