= Andrew Fletcher (businessman) =

Andrew Vernon Fletcher AO is a South Australian engineer and defence industry businessman, best known for his role as chief executive officer of Defence SA. In May 2015 he was appointed CEO of Rheinmetall Defence Australia.

== Career ==
Fletcher began a career in engineering in 1970 in Adelaide with Kinnaird Hill deRohan and Young. For the next decade, he worked for Sir Alexander Gibb and Pak Poy and Kneebone then began his own consultancy. He later merged with Scott and Furphy, which would eventually become CMPS&F. Fletcher then worked at Kinhill, eventually rising to dual positions of Senior Vice President – Global Infrastructure and Senior Vice President – Asia Pacific in 2001.

In 2005, Fletcher was appointed chair of the South Australian government's Major Projects Facilitation Group (MPFG) . The group was tasked to advise on the implementation of the Building South Australia – Strategic Infrastructure Plan, which was developed that year. He also represented the Economic Development Board of South Australia within the group, along with fellow group members John Bastian, Grant Belchamber. Malcolm Kinnaird offered occasional advice to the group and Simon Stretton provided expertise on probity and auditing.

From 2005 until 2007 Fletcher was CEO and managing director of the Port Adelaide Maritime Corporation.

Fletcher was appointed CEO of Defence SA at its establishment by South Australian Premier Mike Rann in 2007 and held the position until 2014. On leaving the position, Premier Jay Weatherill described him as "a major contributor to South Australia becoming the defence state... He has played a significant role in securing the AWD contracts, creating Techport and he has overseen SA gain a quarter of work from the nation’s defence spend."

In 2009, Fletcher was awarded 2009 Professional Engineer of the Year award from the South Australian branch of Engineers Australia.

In May 2015, Fletcher was appointed as the CEO of Rheinmetall Defence Australia. He had previously visited the company while on international trade delegations with Kevin Scarce.

Fletcher held business interests in the wine industry for twenty years prior to 2013, in partnership with Warren Randall via Tinlins Wines of McLaren Vale.

== Memberships ==
He is a past and present member of various South Australian boards and councils, including the Council of Flinders University, the South Australian Economic Development Board, the Entertainment Centre Board, the Environment Protection Authority, the Defence SA Advisory Board and the Defence Systems Innovation Centre Advisory Board.

== Personal views ==
In 2011, Fletcher expressed his personal belief that it would be unlikely for Australia's Future Submarine project to commit to producing nuclear powered submarines, unless a nuclear industry was established in Australia beforehand, or if their production was outsourced offshore. He expressed his belief that a commitment to 12 diesel-powered submarines was more likely.

== Personal life ==
Fletcher lived in a mansion in Heathfield on a property called Kingsbrae prior to its sale in 2015.
