= Andy Fletcher (American football) =

American football player (1895–1978)

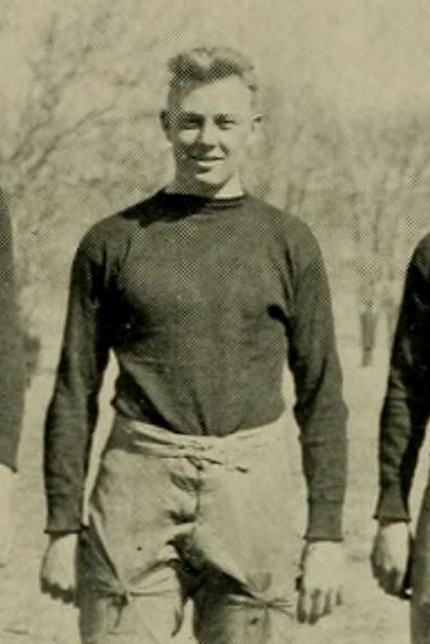
- Fletcher pictured c. 1917 at Maryland

Profile
- Positions: Halfback, Fullback

Personal information
- Born: February 1, 1895; Lucinda, Pennsylvania, U.S.
- Died: October 15, 1978 (aged 83); Crestline, California, U.S.
- Listed height: 5 ft 6 in (1.68 m)
- Listed weight: 165 lb (75 kg)

Career information
- College: Maryland

Career history
- 1920: Buffalo All-Americans
- 1921: Tonawanda Kardex

Awards and highlights

Andrew Edward Fletcher (February 1, 1895 - October 15, 1978) was an American football player. He played college football as a back at the University of Maryland, and earned varsity letters in 1916 and 1917. Fletcher then had a brief professional playing career in the fledgling National Football League (NFL). In 1920, he played two games for the Buffalo All-Americans. The following season, in 1921, Fletcher played one game for Tonawanda Kardex.
