= John Fletcher (lineman) =

American football player (born 1965)

No. 71
- Position: Lineman

Personal information
- Born: August 22, 1965 (age 61); Uvalde, Texas, U.S.
- Listed height: 6 ft 3 in (1.91 m)
- Listed weight: 293 lb (133 kg)

Career information
- High school: Foy H. Moody
- College: Texas A&I
- NFL draft: 1987: undrafted

Career history
- Cleveland Browns (1987)*; Cincinnati Bengals (1987); San Diego Chargers (1988)*; New York Jets (1989)*; Toronto Argonauts (1990)*; Winnipeg Blue Bombers (1990); Montreal Machine (1991); San Antonio Riders (1991); Cleveland Thunderbolts (1992–1993)
- * Offseason or practice squad member only
- Stats at Pro Football Reference

John Williams Fletcher (born August 22, 1965) is an American former football offensive and defensive lineman. He played college football for the Texas A&I Javelinas and later was a member of nine teams in four leagues; he played three games for the Cincinnati Bengals of the National Football League (NFL) in 1987 as a replacement player.

Fletcher attended Foy H. Moody High School where he was used as a blocking tight end. He also played basketball and threw shot put for the track and field team, being named the school's best athlete. He committed to play college football at Texas A&I University. He played three years for the team as an offensive lineman.

After going unselected in the 1987 NFL draft, Fletcher was signed by the Cleveland Browns as an undrafted free agent and was moved to defensive lineman, but did not make the team. He signed with the Cincinnati Bengals as a replacement player during the 1987 NFL strike and played three games as a backup offensive guard. He signed with the San Diego Chargers as a defensive lineman in 1988 but did not make the team. He joined the New York Jets in 1989 but was released following a failed physical.

Fletcher moved to the Canadian Football League (CFL) in 1990, spending time with both the Toronto Argonauts and Winnipeg Blue Bombers as a defensive lineman. He was selected by the Montreal Machine of the World League of American Football (WLAF) in 1991 and after being waived by them before the season, joined the San Antonio Riders and played eight games that year on defense, totaling a sack. From 1992 to 1993, he then played in the Arena Football League (AFL) for the Cleveland Thunderbolts to finish his career.
