= Richard Fletcher (conductor) =

Richard F. Fletcher is an American conductor, composer and bassist. He has conducted for orchestras as well as opera and ballet companies.

== Early life and education ==
Fletcher was born in Massachusetts. He began composing at age ten and subsequently studied piano, double bass, music theory and composition. He was awarded a Bruno Walter scholarship to the Juilliard School in New York where he studied conducting with Sixten Ehrling and Peter Maag, and composition with David Diamond and Roger Sessions. He also studied double bass and conducting at the New England Conservatory in Boston where he worked with Frank Battisti and Gunther Schuller, and he studied composition and conducting privately in New York with Jacques-Louis Monod, well-known music theorist and composer.

== Career ==
During the early stages of his career Fletcher performed extensively on the double bass, including regular performances with the Boston Symphony Orchestra and Boston Pops Orchestra. He was awarded the C.D. Jackson prize as an outstanding instrumentalist for two summers as a student at the Berkshire Music Center at Tanglewood.

Fletcher worked in a master class at the Juilliard School with Sir Georg Solti, and on his recommendation was subsequently invited to guest conduct the Chicago Civic Orchestra.

Fletcher was awarded a Fulbright Scholarship to study conducting in Vienna with Hans Swarovsky. While in Europe he also studied conducting with Kurt Masur, Franco Ferrara and Sergiu Celibidache, and was a prize winner in several International conducting competitions including The Grzegorz Fitelberg International Competition for Conductors in Katowice Poland.

After returning from Europe Fletcher was appointed William Steinberg assistant conductor of the Pittsburgh Symphony where he worked with Andre Previn, then assistant conductor of the New York Philharmonic where he worked with a number of well known conductors. Later he served on the conducting staff of the Houston Symphony where he worked with Sergiu Comissiona. He was awarded the Julius Rudel conducting fellowship with the New York City Opera, where he served as Sergiu Comissiona's personal assistant and worked on the conducting staff of the New York City Opera.

Since then he has conducted many orchestras, opera and dance companies throughout the United States, Europe, and South America. His work received positive reviews from The New York Times and La Nazione of Florence Italy. In North America he has conducted the New York Philharmonic, Pittsburgh Symphony, New York City Opera, New York City Ballet, Vancouver Symphony, Houston Symphony, Rochester Philharmonic, Buffalo Philharmonic, Syracuse Symphony, Juilliard Orchestra, and the Music Today Ensemble of New York.

Fletcher has also conducted the Hamburg State Opera, the Royal Danish Theater in Copenhagen, the Helsinki Philharmonic, Maggio Musicale in Florence, Staatstheater Darmstadt, Staatstheater Nürnberg, Staatstheater Hagen, Staatsorchester Rheinische Philharmonie in Koblenz, Germany, Jerusalem Symphony, Spanish Radio & Television Orchestra (RTVE) Madrid, Orchestra of Castille and Leon in Valladolid, "George Enescu" Philharmonic Orchestra Bucharest, Irish Radio Orchestra Dublin, São Paulo State Symphony, and the Silesian State Philharmonic, in Poland.

Fletcher has been the Principal Conductor of the Bremerhaven State Opera (Germany) since 2009. He has taught at the Juilliard School, the New England Conservatory of Music, and the USC Thornton School of Music. He has also composed music for independent films.
