= David Fletcher (swimmer) =

Northern Irish swimmer (born c. 1936)

Personal information
- Nationality: British (Northern Irish)
- Born: c. 1936

Sport
- Sport: Swimming
- Event: Breaststroke
- Club: Victoria SC, Belfast

David Fletcher (born c. 1936) is a former swimmer from Northern Ireland, who represented Northern Ireland at the British Empire Games (now Commonwealth Games).

== Biography ==
Fletcher was an initially a member of the Beaver Swimming Club before he joined the Victoria Swimming Club in Belfast. He was the 1952 Irish junior breaststroke champion and the Ulster champion, in addition to representing Ulster at senior level.

Fletcher specialsed in the breaststroke and broke the eight-year-old Irish breaststroke record in July 1954.

He represented the 1954 Northern Irish Team at the 1954 British Empire and Commonwealth Games in Vancouver, Canada, participating in the 220 yards breaststroke event.

His selection for the games had caused a protest from the Post Office ASC, who claimed that their own swimmer Alan McCrum had beaten Fletcher in a trials event. However, after the games he was given a civic reception by the Lord and Mayor and Lady Mayoress at the Belfast City Hall.
