= John Fletcher (cricketer, born 1893) =

Australian cricketer

Personal information
- Born: 27 October 1893; Brisbane, Queensland, Australia
- Died: August 1968; Brisbane, Queensland, Australia
- Source: Cricinfo, 3 October 2020

John Fletcher (27 October 1893 – August 1968) was an Australian cricketer. He played in one first-class match for Queensland in 1919/20.

== See also ==
- List of Queensland first-class cricketers
