= George Fletcher (cowboy) =

Cowboy and rodeo rider

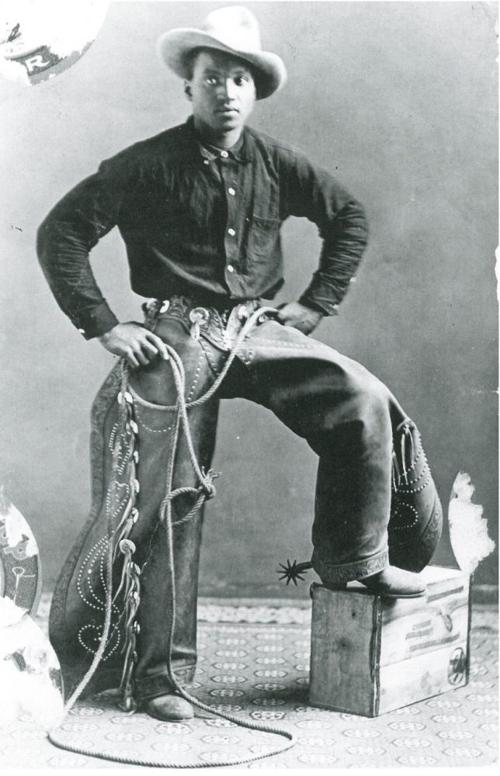
- George Fletcher
- Occupation(s): Cowboy and rodeo performer

George Fletcher (1890-1973) was a cowboy and rodeo rider raised near Pendleton, Oregon. In 1911 he took second place in the Pendleton Round-Up Rodeo, in 1969 he became one of 10 people inducted into the first class of the Pendleton Round-Up Hall of Fame, and in 2001 he was inducted into the National Cowboy Hall of Fame.

== Early life ==
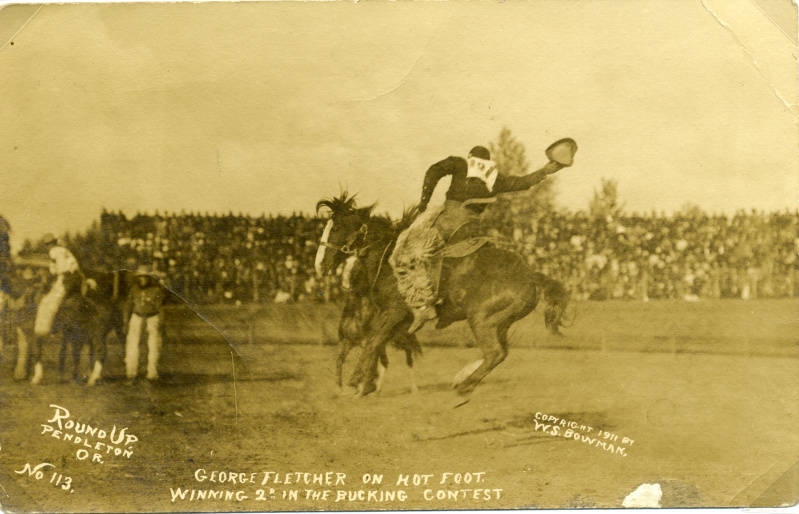
George Fletcher, 1911 at the Pendleton Round Up. Riding Hot Foot and winning 2nd in the bucking contest.

George Fletcher was raised near Pendleton, Oregon. Fletcher spent his early years working horses on nearby ranches and on the Umatilla Indian Reservation until he entered his first rodeo at age 16.

== Rodeo ==
George Fletcher was the first African American to compete for a world championship in bronco riding at the 1911 Pendleton Roundup; he was denied the championship saddle by the judges, but the crowd declared him the "People's Champion."

== Rodeo Championships ==
- 1911 World Championship in Bronco Riding, 2nd place

== Legacy ==
In 1969 Fletcher was inducted into the Pendleton Round-Up Hall of Fame. In 2001 he was inducted into the National Cowboy Hall of Fame.

A bronze statue of George Fletcher, by artist Jerry Werner, was the first statue of an African-American in Pendleton, Oregon. The statue, erected in 2014 and located on the 300 block of Main St., cost $50,000 and was funded through donations from the Pendleton Foundation Trust, the Samuel Johnson Foundation, the Pacific Power Foundation, the Union Pacific Foundation and the Wildhorse Foundation. The statue is the third of four bronze statues that are part of a project led by the Pendleton Arts Commission. It is also part of the Pendleton Bronze Trail of statues.

In 2019 a fictional account of Fletcher's experiences was published in a book titled, "Let 'Er Buck!" George Fletcher, The People's Champion".
