= Thomas Fletcher (cricketer) =

English cricketer

Thomas Fletcher (15 June 1881 — 29 September 1954) was an English cricketer. who played for Derbyshire during the 1906 season.

== Biography ==
Fletcher was born in Heanor, Derbyshire and played in just a single innings for Derbyshire, during a West Indian tour of England in 1906, in which he played in the lower order. Fletcher was a right-handed batsman and a right-arm medium-pace bowler. He scored 28 runs in the first innings before being bowled by Percy Goodman, though he did not bat in the second innings, as Derbyshire ran won by a six wicket margin.

Fletcher died in Markeaton at the age of 73.

Another Derbyshire cricketer, Henry Fletcher, played for Derbyshire between 1907 and 1908, though it is unclear as to whether the two were related.
