= David Fletcher (cricketer) =

English cricketer (1924–2015)

Personal information
- Full name: David George William Fletcher
- Born: 6 July 1924; Sutton, Surrey, England
- Died: 27 April 2015 (aged 90)
- Batting: Right-handed

Career statistics
Competition	First-class
Matches	316
Runs scored	14,461
Batting average	30.25
100s/50s	22/76
Top score	194
Balls bowled	6
Wickets	0
Bowling average	–
5 wickets in innings	–
10 wickets in match	–
Best bowling	–
Catches/stumpings	178/–
- Source: CricketArchive, 15 April 2023

David George William Fletcher (6 July 1924 – 27 April 2015) was an English cricketer who played for Surrey. He generally opened the batting, though he moved down the order towards the end of his career. He had a good range of strokes, most notably the drive and the hook.

Born in Sutton, Surrey, Fletcher joined Surrey immediately after the war. He had only a single game in 1946, but the following year established his place in the side and scored four hundreds. One of those came in strange circumstances, when he played for the North against the South at Kingston upon Thames because they were a man short.

From 1948 to 1951 he fared poorly, but he returned to form in 1952, when his 1960 runs at 37.96 made an important contribution to the first of Surrey's seven successive County Championship wins. He also did well in 1953, but after that rather fell away, although he kept his place in the side. He had a good season in 1960, but the following year he played in only one match after mid-May and announced his retirement.

He died on 27 April 2015.
