= Andy Fletcher (rugby league) =

English rugby league footballer

Andrew Fletcher
Personal information
- Full name: Andrew Fletcher
- Born: 23 November 1957 (age 67)

Playing information
- Position: Wing
Club
Years	Team	Pld	T	G	FG	P
1977–86	Wakefield Trinity	205	88	0	0	282
1986–87	Mansfield Marksman	36	10	0	0	40
1987–88	Barrow	16	2	0	0	8
1988–89	Wakefield Trinity	24	8	0	0	32
	Total	281	108	0	0	362
Representative
Years	Team	Pld	T	G	FG	P
1979–80	Yorkshire	4	3	0	0	9

Andrew Fletcher (born 23 November 1957) is a former professional rugby league footballer who played in the 1970s, 1980s and 1990s. He played at representative level for Yorkshire, and at club level for Wakefield Trinity (two spells), Mansfield Marksman and Barrow, as a wing.

== Playing career ==
=== County honours ===
Andy Fletcher won cap(s) for Yorkshire while at Wakefield Trinity.

=== Challenge Cup Final appearances ===
Andy Fletcher played on the wing in Wakefield Trinity's 3-12 defeat by Widnes in the 1979 Challenge Cup Final during the 1978–79 season at Wembley Stadium, London on Saturday 5 May 1979, in front of a crowd of a crowd of 94,218.

=== Club career ===
During his time at Wakefield Trinity he scored seventy 3-point tries and, eighteen 4-point tries.
