= Charles L. Fletcher =

American architect

Charles L. Fletcher Jr.
- Born: Charles Leonard Fletcher Jr. October 18, 1971 (age 54); Florence, South Carolina
- Education: University of Nebraska–Lincoln (B.A.); Boston Architectural College (M.A.)
- Occupations: Architect, interior designer
- Years active: 2004–present
- Website: charlesfletcherdesigns.com

Charles L. Fletcher (born October 18, 1971) is an American architectural consultant and interior designer. He was the owner of Charles Fletcher Designs. In 2010, he joined the firm of Fennick McCredie Architecture of Boston, Massachusetts. In 2014, he started his own company DeChoix. Design. in Switzerland. His work has been featured in the Boston Globe newspaper, New England Home magazine, as well as industry news and entertainment magazines and national television programs, including the Today Show with Meredith Vieira.

== Personal background ==
Charles Leonard Fletcher Jr. was born on October 18, 1971, in Florence, South Carolina and raised in Grand Junction, Colorado. He is the son of Charles Leonard Fletcher Sr. of Grand Junction, and Mary Jane Cash of Paducah, Kentucky. He has one sister, Melissa, of Colorado Springs. Fletcher attended Campion Academy of Loveland, Colorado, graduating in 1990. He later attended the University of Nebraska–Lincoln, graduating in 1996 with a degree in Biology. In 2004, he graduated from Boston Architectural College with a Master's degree in Architecture. As of 2014, he resides in St-Legier-La Chiesaz, Switzerland.

== Professional background ==
Academia

Following his graduation from the University of Nebraska, Fletcher began working with the South Lancaster Academy in Massachusetts, where he taught English, math, science, and drama. He additionally served as a member of the faculty at the Guam Academy in Talofofo, Guam.

Design

In 2002, Fletcher established Charles Fletcher Designs, based out of Boston. The firm specializes in interior design, furniture design, real estate staging, and architectural renovation. In 2010, he joined the firm of Fennick McCredie Architecture, where he serves as Project Manager and Residential Interior Designer. His architectural work and residential, commercial, and office interior designs have been featured in New England Home, South End News, Boston Globe Magazine, Boston Magazine, Signature Kitchens & Baths, Boston Business Journal, Design Boston, Surroundings, The Boston Globe, Boston Common Magazine, and the Today Show with Meredith Vieira.
