= George P. Fletcher =

American legal scholar (born 1939)

- Born: March 5, 1939 (age 87); Chicago, Illinois
- Education: Cornell University; University of California, Berkeley (BA); University of Chicago (JD)
- Scientific career
- Fields: Criminal law, legal philosophy
- Workplaces: Columbia Law School

George P. Fletcher (born March 5, 1939) is the Cardozo Professor of Jurisprudence at Columbia University School of Law.

Fletcher attended Cornell University from 1956 to 1959, studying mathematics and Russian. He received a B.A. in 1960 from University of California, Berkeley and his J.D. in 1964 from the University of Chicago. He studied at the University of Freiburg from 1964 to 1965 and received a Masters in Comparative Law in 1965 from the University of Chicago. He taught at the law schools of the University of Florida, University of Washington, and Boston College and then UCLA, from 1969 to 1983. Since then he has taught at Columbia Law School in New York where he was made Charles Keller Beekman Professor of Law in 1989 and Cardozo Professor of Jurisprudence in 1994. He has been a visiting professor at the Hebrew University of Jerusalem, the Free University of Brussels, the University of Frankfurt, Germany, and Yale Law School.

An internationally recognized scholar of criminal law, torts, comparative law, and legal philosophy, Fletcher is one of the most cited experts in the United States on criminal law. The 2003 Propter Honoris Respectum issue of the Notre Dame Law Review was dedicated to the study of his work, and symposia on his scholarship have been hosted by the Cardozo Law Review and Criminal Justice Ethics.

Fletcher's most widely-taught book Rethinking Criminal Law is a "well known time-honored classic of criminal law jurisprudence and the most cited scholarly book on criminal law second only to Glanville Williams Criminal Law: The General Part." The book was cited both by the majority opinion by Justice O'Connor and the dissenting opinion of Justice Brennan in the U.S. Supreme Court case, Tison v. Arizona, 481 U.S. 137 (1987). Fletcher was honored on the twenty-fifth anniversary of its publication with a "Symposium: Twenty-Five Years of George Fletcher's Rethinking Criminal Law."

In 2013, Oxford University Press published Fletcher's Essays on Criminal Law, edited by Russell L. Christopher and with contributions by an international panel of leading scholars including Kyron Huigens, Douglas Husak, John Gardner, Larry Alexander and Kimberly Ferzan, Heidi Hurd, Susan Estrich, Peter Westen, Alon Harel, Joshua Dressler, Victoria Nourse, Judge John T. Noonan, Jr., Alan Wertheimer, and Stephen Schulhofer.

In 1989, the American Bar Association awarded the Silver Gavel for outstanding lawbook of the year to Fletcher's study of the trial of the "subway vigilante," Bernard Goetz, "A Crime of Self-Defense." The bar noted the book probed the complex question of self-defense and its legal and moral implications for contemporary urban life.

Fletcher has been active in several high-profile legal disputes. He was an expert witness in the Agent Orange case, presenting evidence for the court that the use of herbicides and defoliants violated international law as they were considered chemical weapons. However, the court ruled that the use of herbicides and defoliants in Vietnam were not meant to poison humans but to destroy plants which provided cover or concealment to the enemy, therefore Agent Orange fall under the category of herbicidal warfare. The court also used the British's use of Agent Orange during the Malayan Emergency to help dismissed the claims of people exposed to Agent Orange in their suit against the chemical companies that had supplied it. His brief before the U.S. Supreme Court in Hamdan v. Rumsfeld argued that the customary law of war did not recognize the crime of conspiracy, and therefore the U.S. military commissions had no jurisdiction over a charge of conspiracy. This argument was adopted by Justice Stevens in his opinion for the majority.

== Basic Concepts of the Criminal Law ==
Fletcher has restated some of his early work in Basic Concepts of Criminal Law, which has also been the foundation for much of his later work in criminal theory and international criminal law. In it, he argues that there is a danger in too much variation from jurisdiction to jurisdiction. Rather, it is better to see the criminal law not as a purely codified enterprise but as a series of localized resolutions to twelve recurrent issues: (1) The tension between substantive criminal law and the procedures of criminal investigation and prosecution. (2) The distinction between criminal punishment and other state-induced burdens, like deportation. (3) The treatment of a suspect as a subject or as an object (or as a person or as a means for influencing other persons). (4) The difference between causation and occurrence of harm. (5) The problem of attribution of wrongdoing to a given person or persons. (6) The difference between an offense and a defense. (7) The difference between negligence and intent. (8) The role of self-defense contrasted with necessity. (9) The relevance or irrelevance of a mistake to criminality. (10) The role of attempt or incompleteness of an offense. (11) The difference between perpetrators and accessories. (12) The conflict between legality and justice.

== Comparative Law and American Law ==
The contrasts and resonances of other legal systems best explain American law. In many works, particularly in torts and criminal law, Fletcher has argued that the tensions in U.S. law are resolved similarly in other legal systems but with critical variations that highlight the unique aspects of American approaches. This is particularly true in the continuing role between rules based on reasonableness or on the right or on reciprocity.

== Books ==
- American Law in a Global Context: The Basics co-authored with Steve Sheppard (Oxford University Press, 2005), translated into Mandarin.
- Our Secret Constitution: How Lincoln Redefined American Democracy (Oxford University Press, 2001) was honored as the best book on law published in 2001 by the Association of American Publishers.
- Basic Concepts of Criminal Law (Oxford University Press, 1998)(Spanish edition, 1997; Russian edition, 1998; Iranian edition, 2005; Italian edition forthcoming).
- Basic Concepts of Legal Thought (Oxford University Press, 1996).
- With Justice for Some: Victims' Rights in Criminal Trials (Addison Wesley, 1995),(paperback, 1996; Spanish edition, 1996) quoted by Marsha Clark in the O.J. Simpson trial.
- Loyalty: An Essay on the Morality of Relationships (Oxford University Press, 1993), praised by William Safire twice in his column in the New York Times, translated in French, German, and Spanish.
- A Crime of Self-Defense: Bernhard Goetz and the Law on Trial (Free Press, 1988), translated into German, Spanish, Italian, and Japanese.

== Selected Honors ==
- Winner of the German Wissenschaftspreis, 1995.
- First American to receive the Humboldt Forschungspreis, 1996.
- Delivered Storrs Lectures at Yale, 2001.
- Elected a Fellow of the American Academy of Arts and Sciences, 2004.
- Silvia Sandano Prize on Criminal Law, Rome (Senate of the Italian Republic), 2016.
