= Mark Fletcher (footballer) =

English footballer

Personal information
- Date of birth: 1 April 1965 (age 61)
- Place of birth: Barnsley, England
- Position: Right back

Senior career*
Years	Team	Apps	(Gls)
1983–1984	Barnsley	1	(0)
1984–1985	Bradford City	6	(0)
- Matlock Town
Total		7	(0)
- * Club domestic league appearances and goals

Mark Fletcher (born 1 April 1965) is an English former professional footballer who played as a right back.

== Career ==
Born in Barnsley, Fletcher played for Barnsley, Bradford City and Matlock Town.
