= George Fletcher (communist) =

British communist activist and baker (1879–1958

George Henry Fletcher (7 September 1879 – 8 June 1958) was a British communist activist and baker.

== Life ==
Born in Horncastle in Lincolnshire, Fletcher completed an apprenticeship as a baker and, after a short period working as a miner, found work at Simmersons bakery in Sheffield. There, he started a branch of the Amalgamated Union of Operative Bakers, and became its chair.

In 1898, Fletcher joined the Sheffield Socialist Society (SSS), and around this time, he also started a small bakery of his own. In 1902, he worked with other SSS members to form a Brightside, Sheffield branch of the Social Democratic Federation (SDF). He was an agreed joint Labour candidate in the 1905 local elections in Burngreave, losing by only four votes. He also began speaking regularly at open air meetings for the party. In 1910, he was fined 40 shillings for speaking in High Hazels Park; soon after, he was sentenced to 56 days in prison for speaking in Hillsborough Park.

Fletcher was elected to the executive committee of the Sheffield Trades and Labour Council in 1914, and as vice-chair in 1915. He organised anti-war rallies, and was prominent in the No Conscription Fellowship. He also played a role in supporting the Sheffield Workers' Committee, and was prominent in the bakers' national strike of 1919.

In 1920, Fletcher was a founder of both the Communist Party of Great Britain (CPGB) and the Sheffield National Unemployed Workers Movement. In 1921, he was sentenced to three months in prison on charges of sedition for speaking in favour of a miners' strike. He was later appointed treasurer of the National Minority Movement.

Although Fletcher chaired the local CPGB branch, he was adopted as a Labour Party candidate and was elected to the Board of Guardians in 1922, representing Darnall, and acting as the board's treasurer. He was expelled from Labour in 1928, and then stood for the CPGB in Sheffield Attercliffe at the 1929 and 1931 general elections. The Board of Guardians was abolished in 1929, and Fletcher stood for Sheffield City Council unsuccessfully that year, then in 1932 and 1935 in Manor, each time taking more than 1,000 votes.

During a 1930 hunger march, Fletcher was arrested and fined while leading a Sheffield contingent; it was petitioning the Labour government to take steps to reduce unemployment.

Fletcher retired near the start of World War II, but continued to support the CPGB financially. In his spare time, he was a fan of Sheffield Wednesday F.C. and attended most of their matches.

Fletcher's son, also named George, was a founding member of the Young Communist League in 1921. In 1923, the father and son set up a small venture, running bread vans to supply their own shops. By 1999 it had grown into a large, profitable business that was sold by their heir, Paul Fletcher, to Northern Foods for £40 million.

George Fletcher died in Nottingham in June 1958, at age 78.
