= Dick Fletcher =

American broadcast meteorologist

- Born: September 18, 1942; Omaha, Nebraska, U.S.
- Died: February 26, 2008 (aged 65); St. Petersburg, Florida, U.S.
- Other name: Fletch
- Known for: Television meteorologist
- Spouse: Cindy
- Children: 3

Richard R. Fletcher (September 18, 1942 – February 26, 2008) was a broadcast meteorologist. He was Chief Meteorologist for WTSP in St. Petersburg, Florida, for 28 years. He was a holder of the American Meteorological Society Seal of Approval, having received it in 1978.

== Early life ==
Fletcher, a native of Omaha, Nebraska, graduated from the University of Omaha in 1964. He had an early ambition to be a television news broadcaster and started his career in Cedar Rapids, Iowa at KCRG, working as a news anchor and occasionally doing the weather.

In the early 1970s, he began working as a full-time meteorologist at KOA-TV in Denver, Colorado, and spent several years in the city. In 1976, he went to work in Corpus Christi and then back to KMTV in Omaha. In 1980, he left Omaha to begin his tenure at then-ABC affiliate (now CBS affiliate) WTSP-TV as chief meteorologist on March 17, 1980, replacing WTSP's chief meteorologist, Wally Kinnan. After his death, he relinquished the role to WTSP meteorologist Tammie Souza. He was a former member (1987–1993) of the Tampa Bay Regional Planning Council.

== Career ==
During his lengthy broadcasting career, Fletcher flew aboard reconnaissance aircraft missions into three hurricanes and made 15 different penetrations into the eyes of those storms. In 1987, he was honored by the American Meteorological Society with an award for Outstanding Service by a Broadcast Meteorologist. He was presented the distinguished service award by the National Hurricane Conference in 2003 for his leadership efforts in hurricane preparedness. He also received the Media award from the Florida Governor's Hurricane Conference in 1993.

=== Hurricane Charley ===
During the 2004 hurricane season, Hurricane Charley appeared to be on its way to Tampa Bay. WTSP's studios on Gandy Boulevard, merely two miles west of the Gandy Bridge, were part of the evacuation zone, and the entire staff was forced to leave. The station evacuated to the Clearwater studios of Pinellas 18 (now PCC-TV), a government access (GATV) cable TV channel owned by Pinellas County. This left Fletcher without his weather equipment, and he was the last to know about the sudden eastward shift of the storm as a result. He was forced to broadcast out of Pinellas 18's ill-equipped studios using a Windows PC with a basic radar image as his makeshift weather station. He was visibly upset on the air as the Windows screensaver repeatedly activated.

== Personal ==
He lived in St. Petersburg with his wife, Cindy, and had three adult children. Fletcher was an avid tennis player, often playing in the morning at the St. Petersburg Tennis Center. He was also an avid baseball fan.

== Illnesses and death ==
On November 24, 2003, Fletcher suffered a stroke at the TV station just before a 4 p.m. news broadcast. Subsequent to his first stroke, he made frequent public appearances for the cause of stroke survival and prevention.

On February 18, 2008, Fletcher suffered a second massive stroke while at home. He subsequently died at St. Anthony's Hospital in St. Petersburg early on the morning of February 26, 2008. He was 65 years old according to his obituary.

On February 26, 2009, Fletcher's former WTSP colleagues paid tribute to the man they affectionately remembered as "Fletch."
