= Thomas Fletcher (rugby, born 1874) =

England international rugby union & league footballer

Personal information
- Full name: Thomas Fletcher
- Born: 11 April 1874 Seaton, Cumberland, England
- Died: 28 August 1950 (aged 76) Harrington, England

Playing information

Rugby union
- Position: Centre
Club
Years	Team	Pld	T	G	FG	P
≤1897–≥97	Seaton RFC
Representative
Years	Team	Pld	T	G	FG	P
1897	England	1	0	0	0	0

Rugby league
- Position: Centre
Club
Years	Team	Pld	T	G	FG	P
≤1897–≥97	Seaton ARLFC
1898–1906	Oldham RLFC	100	31	3	0	99
	Total	100	31	3	0	99
Representative
Years	Team	Pld	T	G	FG	P
1898–1913	Cumberland	17	2	0	0	6

Thomas Fletcher (11 April 1874 – 28 August 1950) was an English rugby union and professional rugby league footballer who played in the 1890s and 1900s. He played representative level rugby union (RU) for England, and at club level for Seaton RFC (in Seaton, Workington), as a centre, and representative level rugby league (RL) for Cumberland, and at club level for Seaton ARLFC (three spells) (in Seaton, Workington), and Oldham (two spells), as a centre. Prior to the 1898–99 season, Seaton was a rugby union club.

== Background ==
Tom Fletcher's birth was registered in Seaton, Cumberland, England, and he died aged 76 in Cockermouth, Cumberland, England.

== Playing career ==
=== International honours ===
Tom Fletcher won a cap for England (RU) while at Seaton in 1897 against Wales.

=== County honours ===
Tom Fletcher won caps for Cumberland (RL) while at Seaton (or Oldham) in 1898 against Cheshire and Lancashire.

=== Change of Code ===
When Seaton converted from the rugby union code to the rugby league code for the 1898–99 season, Tom Fletcher would have been 24 years of age. Consequently, he was both a rugby union and rugby league footballer for Seaton.
