= Tom Fletcher (vaudeville) =

American entertainer (1873–1954)

Thomas Fletcher (May 16, 1873 – October 13, 1954) was an African-American vaudeville entertainer, actor, and writer.

== Career ==
Fletcher was born in Portsmouth, Ohio, and started a career on the stage after performing in Uncle Tom's Cabin in his teens. He sang in local talent contests before touring with minstrel shows, and by 1900 was performing regularly in vaudeville with Al Bailey as "Bailey and Fletcher, the Minstrel Boys". With Bailey, he appeared in films made in New York in the early 1900s by Edwin S. Porter.

In 1908, he replaced the group's founder Ernest Hogan as a member of the Memphis Students, an ensemble of singers and dancers who were neither students nor from Memphis. The group, comprising about twenty musicians and dancers, performed regularly on Broadway, and were "the first to perform syncopated music on a public concert stage." In 1919, Fletcher joined the New York Syncopated Orchestra led by Will Marion Cook, and performed in Chicago, Milwaukee and Pittsburgh. Throughout his career he also worked as an entertainer for "the who's who of white America".

His autobiography, 100 Years of the Negro in Show Business: the Tom Fletcher Story, was published in 1954. It "gives the only eyewitness account from a black insider of the late nineteenth- and early twentieth-century theatrical players, personalities and pioneers," including Hogan and Scott Joplin, and has been used as a source by many historians of musical theatre.

Fletcher died in New York in 1954, aged 81.
