= Ted Fletcher =

Australian rules footballer and coach

Personal information
- Born: 13 December 1925
- Died: 13 May 2000 (aged 74)
- Original team: Dandenong
- Height: 187 cm (6 ft 2 in)
- Weight: 94 kg (207 lb)

Playing career^{1}
| Years | Club | Games (Goals) |
| 1944–1954 | Hawthorn | 129 (51) |
- ^{1} Playing statistics correct to the end of 1954.

Career highlights
- Hawthorn best and fairest: 1953; Hawthorn captain: 1953–1954

Edward 'Ted' Fletcher (13 December 1925 - 13 May 2000) was an Australian rules footballer who played with Hawthorn in the VFL.

Fletcher was used in a variety of positions during his career including the ruck and in defence. In 1953 he was appointed club captain and won the Hawthorn 'Best and Fairest' award. He retained the captaincy in the 1954 season.

He left Hawthorn and he became Captain-coach of Sandringham in the VFA for two seasons.

== Honours and achievements ==
Individual

- Hawthorn best and fairest: 1953
- Hawthorn captain: 1953–1954
- Hawthorn life member
