= Charles Fletcher (rugby union) =

New Zealand rugby union player

- Full name: Charles John Compton Fletcher
- Born: 9 May 1894 Rewiti, New Zealand
- Died: 9 September 1973 (aged 79) Auckland, New Zealand
- Height: 183 cm (6 ft 0 in)
- Weight: 86 kg (190 lb)
- School: King's College, Auckland

Rugby union career
- Position: Loose forward
Provincial / State sides
Years	Team	Apps	(Points)
- Auckland
-	North Auckland		
International career
Years	Team	Apps	(Points)
1921	New Zealand	1	(0)

Charles John Compton Fletcher (9 May 1894 – 9 September 1973) was a New Zealand international rugby union player active in the 1910s and 1920s.

Educated at King's College, Fletcher played army rugby while serving his country in World War I, which proved good preparation when he later made the step up to first-class rugby with College Rifles. He won the Auckland championship with College Rifles in 1919 and made his provincial debut for Auckland that year.

Fletcher, a loose forward, won his maiden All Blacks call up in 1920 for a tour of Australia, but subsequently broke his ankle playing a warm-up game and was ruled out for the remainder of the season. Despite being unable to play, Fletcher kept his place in the touring party at the insistence of Moke Belliss, a friend from his war years whose accidental boot had caused the injury.

While competing with Waimauku in 1921, Fletcher became the first player selected by the All Blacks from the North Auckland union, making his international debut in an uncapped match against New South Wales in Christchurch. He was then included in the All Blacks side for the third and final Test against the Springboks at Athletic Park, a 0–0 draw played in torrential rain.

== See also ==
- List of New Zealand national rugby union players
