= Simon Fletcher (artist) =

English painter

Simon Fletcher is an English artist.

== Early life ==
Fletcher was born in Birmingham, England, in 1948. He was kept from school until age 13, and was educated at home until then. He studied at St Alban's School of Art starting in 1966, and in 1967 at Watford Art School, studying printmaking, painting, graphics, and photography. He studied watercolour at West Surrey College of Art and Design (now University for the Creative Arts) and graduated in 1971 with a Fine Arts degree.

== Career ==
After his arts degree ( Diplome de Beaux Arts) Fletcher began his career as a landscape designer and artist but watercolour was always at the centre of his activities and in 1982 he moved to France to paint. His contact with German painters and galleries convinced him that the most innovative modern work in watercolour had been done in Germany and Austria during the first half of the 20th century and the legacy of this period is still being felt in Europe and the US. As Robert Hughes noted in his piece on Morris Louis, much post war US painting was water colour; the strongly pigmented Liquitex paints used by a generation of acrylic painters on white canvas closely resemble watercolour. Painting in this tradition, Fletcher uses the most modern available watercolour paints; he is in touch with paint makers and wants the best, most permanent colours for his large colourful paintings. His years of drawing and study of landscape can be seen in the carefully constructed compositions that are such a characteristic element in his painting and which have earned him the reputation of one of the most important artists working in watercolour today. Fletcher has shown with the best known painters of his generation, written eleven books about his work in watercolour and pastel, has the gold medal for watercolour from the Salon International de Beziers and has been sponsored by amongst others, Hitachi Corporation, Siemans Germany, Faber Castell, The Economist, The British Embassy Oman. His work is in public and private collections all over the world.

He has painted in Morocco, Japan, Oman, India, and Martinique whilst publishing books and articles about his work and giving occasional seminars on drawing and painting.

== Works ==
Fletcher published a book on watercolour, L’Aquarelle, Art de la Transparence (Fleurus, 1995), about the history and technique of watercolour in Europe, Wine and Landscape of the Languedoc, co-produced with author and journalist Rupert Wright, published simultaneously in French and English in 2005. In all he has published ten books about his painting the latest being 'Pastel Praxis' for Edition M Fischer, Munich Germany. For a complete list of publications see www.simonfletcher.org/publications Considered by many critics in Europe to be one of the prominent painters in watercolour today, his work has been sponsored by many large companies and organisations including Hitachi, Japan; Semens, Germany; The Economist, Frankfurt. In 2019 Fletcher was commissioned to create a huge mural by the State run ESAT, centre for the handicapped, in the south of France near Beziers. The work, which took most of the year to design, photograph and print is 70m² and is installed in the recreation hall of the centre. see Fletcher's web site for pictures
