= William Fletcher (cricketer) =

English cricketer

William Fletcher (16 February 1866 – 1 June 1935) was an English first-class cricketer, who played six matches for Yorkshire County Cricket Club between 1891 and 1892.

Born in Whitkirk, Leeds, Yorkshire, England, Fletcher was a right arm fast bowler, who took nine wickets at 24.66, with a best of four for 45 against the M.C.C. He scored 100 runs, batting right-handed, with a top score of 31* in the same game, for an average of 12.50. He also played for the Yorkshire Second XI in 1893.

Fletcher died in Knaresborough, Yorkshire in June 1935.
