= Adam Fletcher (rugby league) =

Greece international rugby league footballer

Personal information
- Full name: Adam Fletcher
- Born: 1 December 1983 (age 41); Australia

Playing information
- Position: Wing, Fullback
Club
Years	Team	Pld	T	G	FG	P
2006–08	Castleford Tigers	24	12	0	0	48

Adam Fletcher (born 1 December 1983) is a former rugby league footballer who played in the 2000s. He played for the Castleford Tigers in the Super League, at the end of 2006 and returned in 2008. He was released at the end of his contract at the end of 2008.

Adam Fletcher's position of choice is on the wing.
