= George Fletcher (baseball) =

American baseball player (1845–1879)

- Outfielder
- Born: April 21, 1845; Brooklyn, New York, U.S.
- Died: June 18, 1879 (aged 34); Brooklyn, New York, U.S.
- Batted: Unknown Threw: Unknown

MLB debut
- June 21, 1872, for the Brooklyn Eckfords

Last MLB appearance
- June 22, 1872, for the Brooklyn Eckfords

MLB statistics
- Games played: 2
- Runs scored: 1
- Hits: 3
- Batting average: .375
- Stats at Baseball Reference

Teams
- National Association of Base Ball Players Washington Nationals (1867) National Association of Professional BBP Brooklyn Eckfords (1872)

George Horace Elliot Fletcher (April 21, 1845 – June 18, 1879) was an American professional baseball player who played outfield in Major League Baseball for the 1872 Brooklyn Eckfords. Fletcher died of "asthenia due to phthisis pulmonalis" in 1879.
