= John Fletcher (priest) =

English Roman Catholic priest and writer

John Fletcher D.D. (died 1848) was an English Roman Catholic priest and writer.

== Life ==
A native of Ormskirk, Lancashire, was educated at Douay College, and at the English seminary of St. Gregory in Paris. When the seminary was dissolved he went to the college of St. Omer, of which his great-uncle William Wilkinson was for some time president.

Fletcher was one of the professors at St. Omer throughout the imprisonment of the members of the college, at Arras and Dourlens, after the French Revolution. On their release in 1795 Fletcher accompanied them to England, and was successively missioner at Hexham, Blackburn, and Weston Underwood. He was created D.D. by Pope Pius VII on 24 August 1821, in recognition of his missionary work and preaching.

Fletcher became chaplain to the Dowager Lady Throckmorton, and served the mission at Leamington. In 1844 he moved to the mission at Northampton, and resigned in 1848, for reasons of his age. He died shortly afterwards.

== Works ==
Fletcher's works are:

- Sermons on various Religious and Moral Subjects, for all the Sundays after Pentecost, 2 vols., London, 1812; 2nd edit. 1821. Prefixed is An Essay on the Spirit of Controversy, which was also published separately and anonymously.
- The Catholic's Manual, translated from the French of Jacques Benigne Bossuet, with preliminary reflections and notes, London, 1817, 1829.
- Thoughts on the Rights and Prerogatives of the Church and State; with some observations upon the question of Catholic Securities, London, 1823.
- Comparative View of the Grounds of the Catholic and Protestant Churches, London, 1826.
- The Difficulties of Protestantism, London, 1829, and again 1832.
- The Catholic's Prayer-Book, London, 1830. For some time this manual was widely used; it was mainly compiled from the manuscript of A Prayer-Book for the Use of the London District, 1813, by Joseph Berington.
- The Prudent Christian, London, 1834.
- Guide to the True Religion, a series of sermons, 2nd edit., London, 1836.
- Transubstantiation, London, 1836.
- Short Historical View of the Rise, Progress, and Establishment of the Anglican Church, London, 1843.

Fletcher also published translations, including those of:

- Edmund Campion, Ten Reasons (1827);
- Antonio de Dominis, Motives for Renouncing the Protestant Religion (1827), and
- Joseph de Maistre, Letters on the Spanish Inquisition (1838).

== See also ==
- Catholic Church in England

== Notes ==
Attribution

This article incorporates text from a publication now in the public domain: Stephen, Leslie, ed. (1889). "Fletcher, John (d.1848?)". Dictionary of National Biography. Vol. 19. London: Smith, Elder & Co.
