= William Fletcher (rugby union) =

England international rugby union player

- Born: William Robert Badger Fletcher; 10 December 1851 Kensington
- Died: 20 April 1895 (aged 43) (registered in) Kensington, London (aged 43 years 131 days)
- School: Marlborough College
- University: University of Oxford

Rugby union career
- Position: Forward
Amateur team(s)
Years	Team	Apps	(Points)
- Oxford University RFC
- Blackheath
- North of England
International career
Years	Team	Apps	(Points)
1873-1875	England	2	

William Fletcher (1851–1895) was a rugby union international who represented England from 1873 to 1875.

== Early life ==
William Fletcher was born on 10 December 1851 in Kensington. He attended Marlborough College, and went on to study at the University of Oxford.

== Rugby union career ==
At Oxford, Fletcher won four blues (1872, 1873 (2), 1874) and played in the first varsity match against Cambridge University in 1872. Fletcher made his international debut on 3 March 1873 at Hamilton Crescent, Glasgow in the Scotland vs England match. He played his final match for England on 8 March 1875 at Edinburgh in the Scotland vs England match.

== Career ==
Fletcher became a merchant in London.
