= Norm Fletcher (footballer, born 1915) =

Australian rules footballer

Personal information
- Full name: Norman Bruce Fletcher
- Born: 10 September 1915; Port Melbourne, Victoria
- Died: 4 March 1992 (aged 76)
- Height: 182 cm (6 ft 0 in)
- Weight: 78 kg (172 lb)

Playing career^{1}
Years	Club	Games (Goals)
1936–1938	South Melbourne	14 (2)
1943	Hawthorn	2 (1)
Total		16 (3)
- ^{1} Playing statistics correct to the end of 1943.

Norman Bruce Fletcher (10 September 1915 – 4 March 1992) was an Australian rules footballer who played for the South Melbourne Football Club and Hawthorn Football Club in the Victorian Football League (VFL).
