= Roby Fletcher =

Australian Congregational minister (1833–1894)

The Reverend William Roby Fletcher (6 April 1833 – 5 June 1894), known as Roby Fletcher or W. Roby Fletcher, was a Congregational minister and vice-chancellor of the University of Adelaide.

Fletcher was born in Manchester, England. He was the son of the Rev. Richard Fletcher, a well-known Congregational minister who ministered in Manchester and later in Melbourne, Victoria, where he died in 1861. Fletcher was educated at Silcoates School in Yorkshire, and in 1849 entered the University of Bonn, followed in 1850 by the Lancashire Independent College and Owens College (later Victoria University, Manchester). He graduated with a Bachelor of Arts degree from London University in 1853 and in the following year received the London University prize for the scripture examination. In 1856 he graduated Master of Arts and won the gold medal. He soon sailed for Sydney and ultimately went to Victoria where he acted as his father's assistant in St Kilda and Sandhurst (now Bendigo). In 1866 he removed to Richmond, Melbourne, and was appointed a professor at the Congregational College of Victoria.

After a tour around the world he became the minister of Stow Memorial Church in Adelaide in March 1876, and filled that position with marked success until 1890, when he resigned to undertake further travel. From 1878 he was a member of the council of the University of Adelaide, of which he was made an honorary M.A. in 1877. During the last illness of Professor Davidson, and subsequent to his death, Fletcher was the acting Hughes Professor of English Language and Literature and Mental and Moral Philosophy. In 1890 he was elected vice-chancellor of the university.
