= Norm Fletcher (footballer, born 1884) =

Australian rules footballer

Personal information
- Full name: Norman Mason Fletcher
- Born: 2 October 1884; Geelong, Victoria
- Died: 22 December 1938 (aged 54); Prahran, Victoria
- Original team: Mercantile

Playing career^{1}
Years	Club	Games (Goals)
1906–07	Geelong	3 (0)
- ^{1} Playing statistics correct to the end of 1907.

Norman Mason Fletcher (2 October 1884 – 22 December 1938) was an Australian rules footballer who played with Geelong in the Victorian Football League (VFL).
