= Norman Vyner Fletcher =

Australian botanist (1867–1889)

Norman Vyner Fletcher BA
- Born: 1867; New South Wales
- Died: 17 December 1889; Stanmore, New South Wales
- Education: Newington College; University of Sydney
- Occupations: Botanist and law clerk
- Parent(s): Kate (née Green) and Joseph Horner Fletcher

Norman Vyner Fletcher (1867 – 17 December 1889) was an Australian arts graduate and law clerk who was notable as a botanist researching eucalypts. Although his early death cut short his research he is listed as an Australian plant collector and Illustrator of note by the Australian National Herbarium.

== Birth and education ==
Fletcher was born in New South Wales, the youngest child of Kate (née Green) and Joseph Horner Fletcher (1823–1890). His father was a Methodist minister and the Principal of Newington College at the time of his birth. He was educated at Newington, both at Newington House on the Parramatta River and later at Stanmore, and won the Schofield Scholarship as Dux in 1883. In 1885 he went up to the University of Sydney and graduated as a Bachelor of Arts in 1888. Upon graduation Fletcher became an articled law clerk.

== Botanist ==
In the early 1880s, Fletcher came under the influence of two noted scientists and teachers at Newington — his brother, Joseph James Fletcher, and the future curator of the Technological Museum, Richard Thomas Baker. This led to his interest in botany. and in particular eucalypts, as both his mentors were experts in this field. He is described as a promising young botanist with a keen interest in eucalypts in Botanists of the eucalypts: short biographies of people who have named eucalypts, whose names have been given to species or who have collected type material.

== Death ==
He was taken ill at Stanmore in early December 1889 and a fortnight later died while his father was detained in Brisbane due to his own ill-health. Fletcher is buried in the Old Wesleyan section of Rookwood Cemetery. He was survived by his parents, two sisters and three brothers, including William Horner Fletcher.

Awards
Preceded by George Abbott	Schofield Scholarship; Dux of Newington College; 1883	Succeeded by Harold Hunt
