= Peter G. Fletcher =

British musician

- Born: 1936
- Died: 1996 (aged 59–60)
- Occupation: Musician

Peter G. Fletcher (9 January 1936 – 21 May 1996) was a British orchestral and choral conductor, music educator and author.

== Early life and education ==
Fletcher finished his early music training as an organ scholar at Jesus College, Cambridge under the tutelage of Thurston Dart and Geraint Jones. Subsequently, he was in the British army as a band master. Fletcher completed his National Service as conductor of the Royal Corps of Signals Band at Catterick Camp.

== Career ==
After leaving the army, Fletcher taught for two years at Uppingham School before being appointed Music Advisor to the East Riding of Yorkshire in conjunction with organist of Beverley Minster. At the age of 30, after 4 years at Beverley, he left Yorkshire to become Staff Inspector of Music with the Inner London Education Authority in 1966. During his 7-year tenure with the ILEA he established the Centre for Young Musicians, the Special Music Course at Pimlico School, and the foundation course for musicians at Kingsway FE College. He was also conductor of the London Schools Symphony Orchestra. One or two recordings remain from this period, notably the Viola Suite and Suite Hébräique by Ernest Bloch with Daniel Daggers as soloist, for the Cameo Classics label.

In 1973 Fletcher emigrated to Canada to take over the chairmanship of the Music Department at Dalhousie University, Halifax, Nova Scotia, at the invitation of Henry D. Hicks. At Dalhousie, he was conductor of the Dalhousie Chorale and the Dalhousie Orchestra, and with the chorale gave performances of several large works including the St. John Passion of Johann Sebastian Bach and Belshazzar's Feast by William Walton. As department chair, Fletcher was a key figure in bringing to Halifax William Tritt, Carol van Feggelen, Jefferson Morris and Phillipe Djokic. Fletcher was also one of the principal founders of the Dalhousie Opera Company, and over several seasons conducted the Marriage of Figaro by Wolfgang Amadeus Mozart, the Barber of Seville by Gioachino Rossini and Tosca by Giacomo Puccini.

In 1976 Fletcher returned to the UK to work in School Music in Leicester, and took over the directorship of the Leicestershire Schools Symphony Orchestra following the retirement of Eric Pinkett. With the orchestra, as Principal Music Advisor for Leicestershire, he embarked upon a series of tours throughout Europe, and as a group they became known for the quality of their performances of Gustav Mahler, Dmitri Shostakovich, Messiaen, Charles Ives, Michael Tippett, Elliott Carter, Douglas Young, Iannis Xenakis and other 20th-century composers.

LSSO archivist John Whitmore recalls that Douglas Young [Composer in Residence in Leicester for 3 years, 1981-84] developed a close musical partnership with Fletcher; this artistic relationship stretched the orchestra's technical and musical abilities greatly, and moved the ensemble forward.

During his 8-year tenure at Leicester, Fletcher also conducted the Leicestershire Chorale and with the orchestra recorded Tippett's The Shires Suite, and made a digital recording of Douglas Young's The Hunting of the Snark, narrated by Peter Easton which was reissued by Cameo Classics, the original label, on CD in 2013. The Chorale was founded in 1977 largely by the efforts of Dr Andrew Fairbairn, the then Director of Education for Leicestershire and Rutland, who had himself been a choral scholar at Trinity College, Cambridge. Fletcher was the first musical director of the Chorale, a role which he continued until 1984. By then links had been established with the Leicestershire Schools Symphony Orchestra and they had accompanied several Chorale performances. This was the beginning of the tradition unique among Chamber Choirs in the region to have at least one major work accompanied by orchestra in each season.

In 1984 Fletcher was appointed Director of the Welsh College of Music and Drama in Cardiff. He attempted to dismiss a number of members of staff: disapproval by the governing body led to the termination of his contract. Classical Music magazine carried a headline "early bath for Fletcher". From 1990 to 1993 Fletcher held the post of Dean of Music at the Hong Kong Academy for Performing Arts, after which he retired to a cottage in North Wales to focus on the writing of his book "World Musics in Context", which was edited and prepared for publication after his death by John Hosier. He had also been the author of the earlier book "Roll over Rock" (1981), a study of the position of music in contemporary culture.

Just before he died in 1996, Fletcher returned to St James the Greater, Leicester to conduct the Leicestershire Chorale in a performance of J. S. Bach's Mass in B minor.
