= William A. Fletcher (Michigan judge) =

American judge

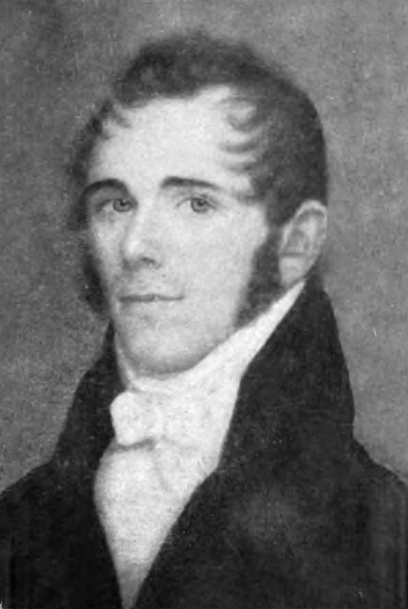
William Asa Fletcher

William Asa Fletcher (June 26, 1788 – September 19, 1852) was an American jurist.

Born in Plymouth, New Hampshire, Fletcher was a merchant in Salem, Michigan and then studied law in Esperance, New York. In 1820, Fletcher moved to Detroit, Michigan Territory and was admitted to the Michigan bar. Fletcher was appointed judge for Wayne County, Michigan Territory and served as Michigan territorial attorney general. From 1830 to 1832, Fletcher served on the Michigan Territorial Council. Fletcher was appointed the first chief justice of Michigan Supreme Court, when Michigan was admitted to the union in 1837 and served as a regent for the University of Michigan at the same time. Fletcher retired in 1842. Fletcher died in Ann Arbor, Michigan.

While serving as a judge, Fletcher was appointed by the Governor to create a code of laws for the new state of Michigan, which was adopted in 1837 and 1838.

As a regent, Fletcher helped to determine the location of the University of Michigan after relocation to Ann Arbor in 1837, which he stood to benefit from as a member of the Ann Arbor Land Company. However, an economic recession in 1838 prevented this.

Fletcher had a reputation as an able lawyer, but one prone to drinking sprees that sometimes interfered with the court's business. On one occasion, an attorney on the losing side of a case immediately appealed, saying, "May it please your honor, I want to appeal from the court drunk to the court sober," and Fletcher granted the appeal. On another occasion, he referred to one of the side judges who assisted him as "the only part of this court that is sober".

== Personal life ==
While living in New York in 1820, Fletcher married his landlady, Gertrude Lawzer. Fletcher left her behind when he moved to Michigan, but she later followed. Lawzer was disliked by many, and Fletcher was regarded as "unfortunate". A university professor recalled that "He married a woman who proved to be insane and had the most curious freaks. Often have I heard her screaming. 'murder' and 'help' at night and have gone to their home on Washtenaw to help quiet her. One of her hobbies was to go about town with a basket of eggs on her arm, dressed in the worst old calico gown imaginable. She would go by back streets to avoid the judge so as not to offend his dignity. She insisted on keeping a cow and always had in the parlor a supply of hay with which to feed it." In 1843, Fletcher was granted a divorce by Supreme Justice Alpheus Felch. In this divorce, Fletcher lost all of his property and would spend the rest of his life without much money. Fletcher remarried in 1846, taking widowed 32 year old Adeline D. Doyle as his second wife. Their marriage lasted until his death in 1852.

== Death and Misplacement of Corpse ==
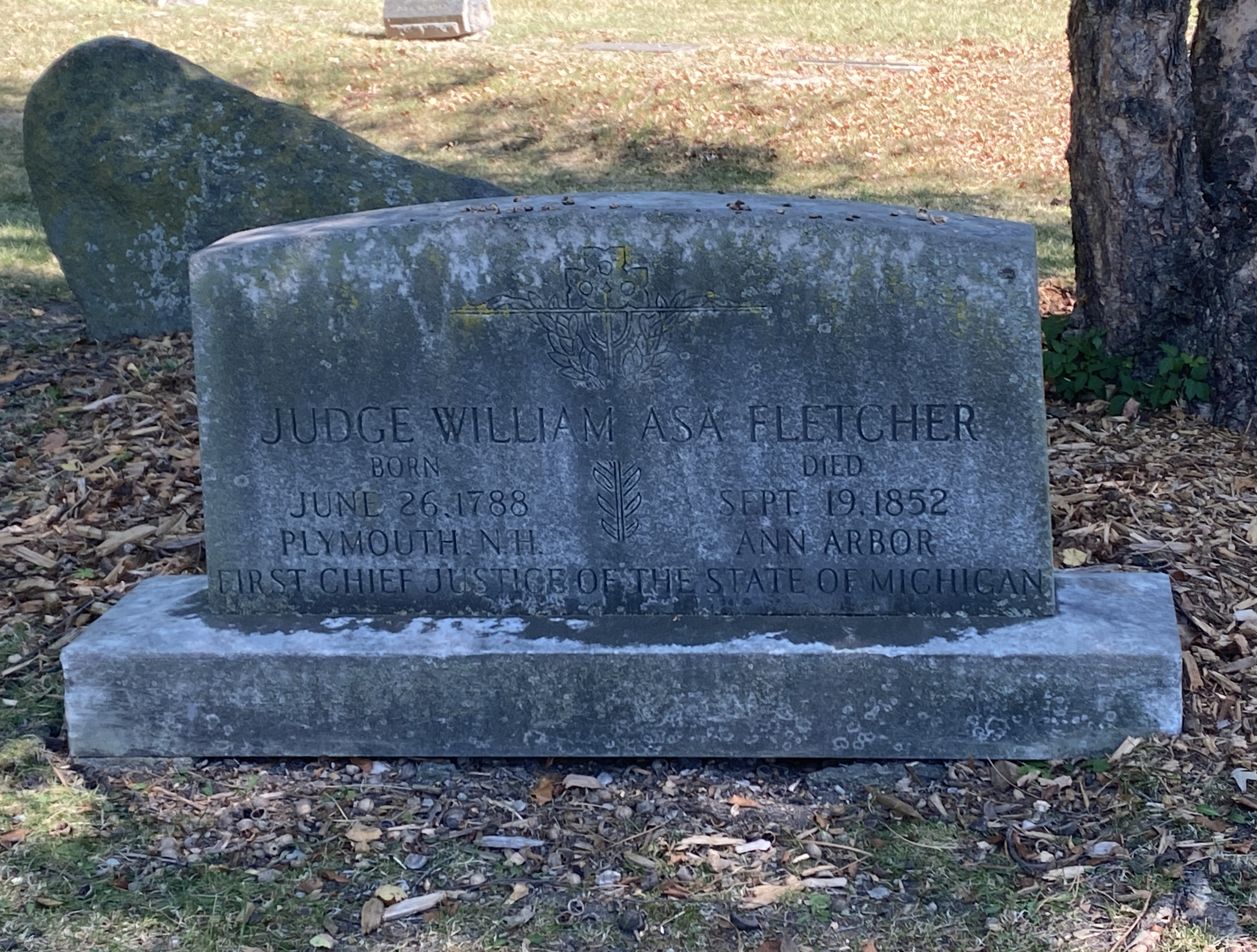
Chief Justice William Asa Fletcher's Headstone in Forest Hill Cemetery, Ann Arbor, MI

Fletcher passed away without much money to his name, rendering him unable to afford a headstone to mark his grave. His colleagues from the Washtenaw bar donated an ornate Egyptian-style metal casket, and he was buried in Ann Arbor's first cemetery, on Huron Street adjacent to his farm. With no clear grave marker, his corpse was forgotten when the cemetery was relocated to Fairview Cemetery, also in Ann Arbor.

In 1897, workers were installing pipes in the area in which Fletcher was buried and a sealed iron casket was unearthed. It matched Fletcher's in terms of style and the time period it was from, and old residents claimed that "without doubt the body was that of the man who was once Michigan's chief justice". The casket was reinterred in there same place but given a few bricks to mark its location. In 1918, it was relocated to Forest Hill Cemetery and a headstone was donated in 1935.

During the construction of a new building for the School of Dentistry in 1966, workers stumbled upon a second sealed iron casket. Unlike the first, this one had a metal plate bearing the inscription "William A. Fletcher, died Sept. 19, 1852, aged 64 years". This was, without a doubt, the body of former Supreme Court Justice William Asa Fletcher. Later that year, Fletcher was reinterred in his plot in Forest Hill Cemetery next to the casket that has been previously mistaken for his own. The man in the casket still remains unidentified.
