= List of people from Shreveport, Louisiana =

This is a list of notable people from Shreveport, Louisiana.

== Actors, models, entertainers ==
- K. D. Aubert, actress and former fashion model
- Nancy Barrett, actress
- Pat Carroll (1927–2022), stage, film and television actress, voiced Ursula the Sea Witch
- Chi Chi DeVayne (1985–2020), drag queen and entertainer
- Virginia Hewitt (1925–1986), actress
- Joshua Logan (1908–1988), Broadway director of South Pacific and Mister Roberts; born in Texarkana, Texas, but raised in Shreveport.
- Mary Miles Minter (1902–1984), silent film actress
- Paul Mooney, comedian
- Colleen Clinkenbeard, voice actress, voices Monkey D. Luffy in the Funimation/Crunchyroll English dub of One Piece
- Lucia Moore (1867–1932), stage and silent film actress
- Tricia O'Neil, actress
- Kevin Rahm, actor
- Andy Sidaris (1931–2007), Hollywood film producer, director, actor, and screenwriter
- Brenda Sykes, actress
- Florence O'Denishawn (Andrews), (1897–1991), dancer and actress
- Zhailon Levingston, actor and Tony-nominated director of Cats: The Jellicle Ball on Broadway

== Artists, designers ==
- Ransom Ashley, photographer and actor
- Kevyn Aucoin, makeup artist and photographer
- Victor Joris (1929–2013), fashion designer, attended C. E. Byrd High School
- Elizabeth McBride, Academy Award nominated costume designer
- Rachel Hewitt designer and carpenter
- Edward F. Neild (1884–1955), architect who designed several prominent Shreveport homes, churches, and venues, as well as the Harry S. Truman Presidential Library and Museum in Independence, Missouri, having been selected for the task by U.S. President Harry Truman
- Randy Thom, sound engineer and designer

== Athletes ==
- Matt Alexander, Major League Baseball, pinch runner, Most career stolen bases and runs scored as a pinch runner
- Evelyn Ashford, winner of sprint gold medals at the 1984, 1988 and 1992 Olympics
- Alan Autry, actor, football player and politician
- Scott Baker, Major League Baseball pitcher
- Arnaz Battle, Notre Dame and NFL player
- Alana Beard, Duke Blue Devils and WNBA player, four-time All-Star
- Albert Belle, Major League Baseball outfielder, five-time All-Star
- Brock Berlin, Evangel Academy, former football quarterback for the University of Florida Gators and University of Miami Hurricanes, professionally for the NFL's Miami Dolphins, Dallas Cowboys, St. Louis Rams, and Detroit Lions
- Henry Black, free safety for the Atlanta Falcons
- Abram Booty, Evangel Academy, LSU wide receiver and Josh Booty's brother
- John David Booty, Evangel Academy, USC and Houston Texans quarterback
- Josh Booty, Evangel Academy, NFL quarterback and MLB third baseman
- Terry Bradshaw, Hall of Fame quarterback (four-time Super Bowl winner for Pittsburgh Steelers) and TV commentator
- Sam Burns, professional golfer
- Kenny Davidson, American football player, DE, Huntington HS, LSU, NFL Steelers, Oilers, Bengals 1990–1996
- Wendell Davis, American football player, WR Fairpark HS, LSU, 1st round pick Chicago Bears 1988–1995
- Keyunta Dawson, Evangel Academy, New Orleans Saints football player
- Joe Dumars (born 1963), basketball player
- Joe Ferguson, football quarterback, Woodlawn High, Arkansas Razorbacks and NFL
- Eddie Fisher (born 1936), baseball pitcher, 1959–1973
- Charlie Hennigan, football player for Houston Oilers
- Jacob Hester, Evangel Academy, San Diego Chargers football player
- Tug Hulett, Evangel Academy, Major League Baseball second baseman
- Stan Humphries, NFL quarterback for Washington Redskins (1988–1991) and San Diego Chargers (1992–1997)
- Antawn Jamison, professional basketball player, 1998–2014
- David Allen Lee, punter for Baltimore Colts, 1966–1978
- Seth Lugo, professional baseball player; graduated from Parkway High School
- Don Mullins, NFL halfback
- Malik Newman (born 1997), basketball player in the Israeli Basketball Premier League
- Bob Oliver, Major League Baseball player, 1965–1975
- Mary Ostrowski, former U.S. National Team gold medalist, West Virginia Sports Hall of Fame
- Robert Parish (born 1953), basketball Hall of Famer, Centenary College and NBA
- Charles Henry Philyaw (born 1954), Texas Southern Tigers, former Oakland Raiders (defensive end) 1976-77 Super Bowl champion
- Chase Pittman (born 1983), Evangel Academy, played college football at LSU and in the NFL for several years
- Michael Qualls (born 1994), basketball player for Hapoel Gilboa Galil of the Israeli Basketball Premier League
- Jermauria Rasco, Evangel Academy, NFL linebacker for the Green Bay Packers, Tampa Bay Buccaneers, and Pittsburgh Steelers, played collegiately for the LSU Tigers
- Freddie Spencer (born 1961), Grand Prix motorcycle champion, won 250cc and 500cc in 1985
- Tommy Spinks (1948–2007), football wide receiver, Woodlawn High School, Louisiana Tech, and Minnesota Vikings
- Hal Sutton, professional golfer, 1983 PGA Championship winner and 2004 Ryder Cup captain
- Stromile Swift, NBA player, 2000–2009
- Trent Taylor, Evangel Academy, NFL wide receiver for the Cincinnati Bengals and San Francisco 49ers
- Eric Thomas, Evangel Academy, gridiron football player; current indoor football wide receiver and return specialist for the Iowa Barnstormers of the IFL, previously for the IFL's Cedar Rapids Titans, Nebraska Danger, and Green Bay Blizzard; played collegiately for the Troy Trojans; former Canadian football wide receiver in the CFL for the Saskatchewan Roughriders; and former American football wide receiver for the Indianapolis Colts and Buffalo Bills of the NFL
- Jerry Tillery, Evangel Academy, NFL defensive end for the Los Angeles Chargers
- David Toms, professional golfer, 2001 PGA Championship and 2018 U.S. Senior Open champions
- Taijuan Walker, pitcher for Philadelphia Phillies
- Todd Walker, baseball player for seven MLB teams, lived in Bossier City
- Ar'Darius Washington, Evangel Academy, NFL safety for the Baltimore Ravens, played collegiately for the TCU Horned Frogs
- Vernon Wells, baseball player for three MLB teams
- Charcandrick West, NFL running back for Kansas City Chiefs
- Sean West, captain, Shreve High School; Major League Baseball pitcher
- Tre'Davious White, football cornerback for the Buffalo Bills
- Monk Williams, football player
- Richard Williams, tennis coach and father and coach to Venus and Serena Williams
- Robert Williams III, NBA player for the Portland Trail Blazers

== Entrepreneurs ==
- Betsy Vogel Boze, president and CEO, College of The Bahamas
- Randle T. Moore (1874–1957), banker, lumberman

== Journalists ==
- Tim Brando (born 1956), radio and CBS and FOX Sports sportscaster
- John D. Ewing, publisher of Shreveport Times, radio station owner
- Jim Leslie (1937–1976), Shreveport journalist and public relations specialist, assassinated in Baton Rouge
- Jeffrey D. Sadow (born 1962), political scientist, columnist, professor at Louisiana State University in Shreveport

== Musicians ==
- Jerry Beach (1941–2016), blues guitarist
- Brady Blade, musician and entrepreneur
- Brian Blade, musician, composer, session musician, and singer-songwriter
- Kix Brooks, country musician (Brooks & Dunn)
- James Burton, guitarist
- John Campbell, blues guitarist
- Leon "Ndugu" Chancler (1952–2018), drummer, played drums on Michael Jackson song "Billie Jean"
- Van Cliburn (1934–2013), concert pianist
- John-Henry Crawford (born 1993), classical cellist
- Jordan Davis, singer
- David Egan (1954–2016), musician
- D. J. Fontana (1931–2018), drummer
- Hurricane Chris, rapper
- John Hoffman, drummer for Primus
- Lead Belly, blues guitarist and singer
- Joe Osborn (1937–2018), studio bassist, "Wrecking Crew" member
- Jack Prince (1920–1994), singer
- Claibe Richardson, guitarist and songwriter
- Kenny Wayne Shepherd, blues guitarist
- Hank Williams, Jr., country music singer
- Jesse Winchester (born 1944), musician, songwriter
- Louise Yazbeck (1910–1995), composer
- Faron Young (1932–1996), country singer/songwriter; member of Country Music Hall of Fame

=== Musical groups ===
- Iwrestledabearonce, deathcore band based in Shreveport
- The Residents, avant-garde musical ensemble; lived in Shreveport until the middle 1960s, when they moved to San Mateo and later to San Francisco

== Politicians, civil servants ==
- Samuel Armstead (c. 1804–1908), politician, minister, and restaurateur; formerly enslaved
- Greg Barro (born 1957), politician
- John Boozman (born 1950), U.S. senator for Arkansas
- Raleigh Brown, Texas House of Representatives and judge
- Roy Brun, district judge and former Republican state legislator
- Charles C. "Hondo" Campbell (1948–2016), 17th commanding general, U.S. Army Forces Command; last surviving general who fought in Vietnam
- Johnnie Cochran (1937–2005), criminal defense attorney for O. J. Simpson
- Tom Cole (born 1949), U.S. representative for Oklahoma
- George W. D'Artois (1925–1977), public safety commissioner
- Jackson B. Davis (1918–2016), attorney and state senator (1956–1980)
- James C. Gardner (1924–2010), mayor of Shreveport, Louisiana
- Lloyd Hendrick (1908–1951), state senator for Caddo and DeSoto parishes, 1940–1948; Shreveport attorney
- Hilry Huckaby III (1944–2001), city representative, Caddo District Judge
- Mike Johnson (born 1972), U.S. representative for Louisiana and speaker of the House of Representatives
- J. Bennett Johnston Jr., U.S. senator from Louisiana
- Russell B. Long, U.S. senator from Louisiana
- Jim McCrery, congressman from Fourth District (R)
- Danny Ray Mitchell, state representative
- Cecil Morgan (1898–1999), state legislator, led impeachment of Huey Pierce Long, Jr., in 1929; later Standard Oil Company executive
- James George Palmer (1875–1952), mayor of Shreveport, 1930–1932
- Buddy Roemer (1943–2021), governor of Louisiana
- Tom Rowland, mayor of Cleveland, Tennessee
- Phil Short (born 1947), state senator from St. Tammany Parish
- Art Sour (1924–2000), state legislator and pioneer of Republican Party in Caddo Parish
- Tom Stagg (1923–2015), U.S. District Court judge
- Jeffrey P. Victory (1946–2024), judge
- Dayton Waller (1925–2015), politician
- Donald Ellsworth Walter, judge of the United States District Court for the Western District of Louisiana, U.S. attorney for the Western District, 1969–1977, based in Shreveport

== Religious leaders ==
- James Dobson (1936–2025), evangelical Christian author, psychologist and founder of Focus on the Family
- William Hicks (pastor) (1869–1954), Baptist pastor in Shreveport, writer, academic administrator
- Billy McCormack (1928–2012), Baptist pastor in Shreveport and founding director of Christian Coalition of America

== Scientists ==
- Beverly Turner Lynds (1929–2024), astronomer

== Writers, authors ==
- Raymond W. Baker, author
- H. Parrott Bacot, art historian
- Jericho Brown, poet
- Charlie Cook, author
- Davidson Garrett, poet and actor
- Bill Joyce, children's author
- Judi Ann Mason, film and television writer
- Perry Meisel, literary critic and academic.
- Mitchell Parish, lyricist
- Jerry Pournelle, author

== Miscellaneous ==
- Nathaniel Code, serial killer
- Rodricus Crawford, exonerated in 2017 for murdering one-year-old son in Shreveport
- Michelle Khare, YouTuber
- Danny Rolling, serial killer known as "The Gainesville Ripper"
