= Frances Lucas =

American academic administrator

- Born: 1957 (age 68–69)
- Education: University of Alabama
- Occupation: Professor
- Employer: Mississippi State University
- Organization(s): Omicron Delta Kappa, Mortar Board
- Website: https://www.franceslucasconsulting.com/

Frances Lucas (born 1956) is the president of Frances Lucas Consulting. Previously, she served as president of Millsaps College, becoming the first female head of the college in 2000.

After her time at Millsaps, she became the Vice President and Campus Executive Officer and a Professor of Practice for the Human Capital Development Program at the University of Southern Mississippi Gulf Coast in Long Beach, Mississippi.

== Personal life ==
Lucas is the daughter of Aubrey K. Lucas, who himself is the former president of Delta State University and later The University of Southern Mississippi and is now president emeritus of The University of Southern Mississippi.

Lucas grew up in Mississippi where she received her Bachelor's from Mississippi State University in 1978, her Master's and her PhD in higher education from the University of Alabama.

== Education career ==
Lucas began her career at Mississippi State working in student affairs before moving on at age 29 to become the youngest Vice-President for Student Affairs and the first female Vice-President at Baldwin-Wallace College. Later, she served as Senior Vice-President for Campus Life at Emory University before being announced in February 2000 as the 10th president and first female president of Millsaps College.

=== Millsaps College ===
After 22 years of leading Millsaps College, George Harmon announced his resignation in the Spring of 1999. His last day as president of Millsaps College was June 30, 2000. After an eight month national search for a successor to Harmon, Frances Lucas was announced in February 2000 as the new president, making her the first female to hold the post at Millsaps.

Lucas submitted her resignation on April 23, 2009 stating her last day would be "June 30, 2010, which will mark the conclusion of my tenth year."

=== University of Southern Mississippi Gulf Coast ===
On April 30, 2010, Lucas was named Vice President and Campus Executive Officer for The University of Southern Mississippi's Gulf Coast operations. Her first official day on the job was July 6, 2010.

== Awards ==
- 2003 - Mississippi's Business Woman of the Year, Mississippi Business Journal
- 2004 - Outstanding Mississippi Woman of the Year, Mississippi State University Women's Commission
