= Thomas Adams =

Thomas Adams may refer to:

== Politicians ==
- Thomas Adams (MP), Member of Parliament for Bedford
- Sir Thomas Adams, 1st Baronet (1586–1667/68), Lord Mayor of London
- Thomas Adams (politician) (1730–1788), Virginia delegate to the Continental Congress
- Thomas Boylston Adams (judge) (1772–1832), son of US president John Adams
- Thomas Boylston Adams (academic) (1910–1997), American writer, executive, and political candidate
- Thomas Burton Adams Jr. (1917–2006), American politician in Florida
- Thomas Adams (sheriff) (1804–1869), sheriff of Norfolk County, Massachusetts
- T. Patton Adams, mayor of Columbia, South Carolina
- Thomas H. Adams (1904–1957), American politician from Nebraska

== Military ==
- Thomas Adams (British Army officer) (c. 1730–1764), British Army major, noted for his defense of the British position in Bengal in 1763
- Sir Thomas Adams, 6th Baronet (1738–1770), naval officer

== Musicians ==
- Thomas Adams (organist, born 1785) (1785–1858), English organist and composer
- Thomas Adams (organist, born 1857) (1857–1918), English organist and composer

== Writers and publishers ==
- Thomas Adams (priest) (1583–1652), English priest and religious writer
- Thomas Adams (publisher) (died 1620), English bookseller and publisher
- Thomas Adams (writer) (c. 1633–1670), English religious writer

== Educators ==
- Thomas Sewall Adams (1873–1933), American economist and educator
- Thomas R. Adams (1921–2008), US educational figure, librarian and professor at Brown University
- Thomas Adams (classicist) (1884–1953), New Zealand professor of classical languages and cricketer

== Other people ==
- Thomas Adams (manufacturer and philanthropist) (1807–1873), English Nottingham lace manufacturer and philanthropist
- Thomas Adams (chewing gum maker) (1818–1905), American businessman
- Thomas Albert Smith Adams (1839–1888), American religious figure
- Thomas Adams (architect) (1871–1940), Scottish-born English pioneer of urban planning
- Tommy Adams (basketball) (Thomas Maurice Adams, born 1980), American basketball player
- Thomas William Adams (1842–1919), New Zealand farmer, forester, churchman and educationalist

== See also ==
- Tom Adams (disambiguation)
- Adams (surname)
