= Bernard Rogers (disambiguation) =

Bernard Rogers (1893–1968) was an American composer.

Bernard Rogers may also refer to:

- B. H. Rogers (1905–1977), Louisiana politician
- Bernard W. Rogers (1921–2008), United States Army general
