= H. Parrott Bacot =

American art historian

- Born: Henry Parrott Bacot, Jr. December 13, 1941; Shreveport, Louisiana, United States
- Died: October 10, 2020 (aged 78); Baton Rouge, Louisiana, United States
- Spouse: Barbara Evelyn SoRelle (m. 1970-2020)

Academic background
- Education: Baylor University; State University of New York at Oneonta

Academic work
- Discipline: Art history
- Sub-discipline: Southern art
- Institutions: Louisiana State University

Henry "Pat" Parrott Bacot, Jr. (December 13, 1941 – October 10, 2020) was an American art historian, curator, and educator. A scholar of Southern art, specifically that of Louisiana, Bacot served as professor of art history emeritus and executive director of the LSU Museum of Art at Louisiana State University.

== Career ==
Born in Shreveport to Henry Sr. and Martha Jane Van Loan, Bacot earned a bachelor of arts in history from Baylor University in 1963 and a master of arts in museology and American folk art from State University of New York at Oneonta in 1972.

In 1967, Bacot began working as a curator at the LSU Museum of Art and an instructor of art history at Louisiana State University. In 1983, he was promoted to professor of art history and executive director of the museum. Bacot retired from the university in 2008.

Throughout his career, he focused on Southern art, specifically that of Louisiana. Bacot studied artists such as Caroline Durieux, Pietro Gualdi, and Marie Adrien Persac, as well as 18th- and 19th-century furniture and decorative arts from the area. His 2000 book on Persac won the Ruth Emery Award for best regional book that year.

Bacot died in 2020. Two years later, the LSU Museum of Art began an annual lecture in his name, the H. Parrott Bacot Distinguished Visiting Scholar Series, which focuses on the decorative arts.

== Works ==
- Nineteenth Century Lighting: Candle-Powered Devices, 1783-1883, 1987 ISBN 9780887400988
- Marie Adrien Persac: Louisiana Artist, 2000 ISBN 9780807126417

== See also ==
- List of Baylor University people
- List of people from Shreveport, Louisiana
