= Joe T. Cawthorn =

American politician

Member of the Louisiana State Senate
- In office 1940–1944 Serving with Lloyd Hendrick
- Preceded by: Roscoe C. Cranor; J. C. Heard
- Succeeded by: Riemer Calhoun; Lloyd Hendrick

Personal details
- Born: October 1, 1911 Selma, Grant Parish, Louisiana, U.S.
- Died: November 11, 1967 (aged 56) Lake Charles, Louisiana, U.S.
- Party: Democratic
- Spouse: Merle Sloan
- Children: 1
- Education: Louisiana State University

Joe T. Cawthorn (October 1, 1911 – November 11, 1967) was an American politician. He served as a Democratic member of the Louisiana State Senate.

Cawthorn was born in Selma, Grant Parish, Louisiana. He graduated from Oak Grove High School, and attended Louisiana State University, where he earned a law degree in 1932. After earning his law degree, Cawthorn became active in Louisiana politics, and was a friend of Huey Long and his son, Russell.

In 1940 Cawthorn was elected to the Louisiana State Senate, serving until 1944. Cawthorn practised as an attorney in Mansfield, Louisiana, but was disbarred in 1953 as a result of a 1948 conviction for jury tampering, for which he received a 2-year sentence. In the 1960s, Cawthorn represented rodeo performer Jack Favor when he was falsely accused of murder.

Cawthorn died in November 1967 at a hospital in Lake Charles, Louisiana. He was pronounced dead at 5:32pm.
