= Randle T. Moore =

Randle Thomas Moore, Sr.
- Randle T. Moore, Sr., Wesley Frost Moore, Randle T. Moore, Jr., (front), Virginia Elizabeth Moore, (rear) Martha Susan Frost Moore, Edwin Ambrose Moore
- Born: March 15, 1874; Mooringsort, Caddo Parish, Louisiana, US
- Died: September 18, 1957 (aged 83); Shreveport, Caddo Parish, Louisiana
- Resting place: Forest Park Cemetery East
- Education: Centenary College of Louisiana
- Occupations: Businessman, Lumberman, Banker

Randle Thomas Moore, Sr. (March 15, 1874 in Mooringsport – September 18, 1957 in Shreveport), was a figure in the development of northwestern Louisiana during the latter part of the 19th century and the first half of the 20th century. Moore is best known to Louisiana history, of which he was a keen student, for a physical confrontation that he had on the streets of downtown Shreveport with the legendary Huey Pierce Long, Jr.

Of humble origin, Randle Moore was born to John Milton Moore and Jennie Elizabeth Mooring (née Jones), both Tennessee natives. His father was a farmer; so Moore spent much of his young life helping in the cotton fields. He eventually worked for others in the area at times for as little as fifty cents a day. In his thirteenth year, Randle raised an eight-bale cotton crop on his own, and used the proceeds to take a course at Draughon's Business College in Texarkana, Arkansas. The skills he acquired there, along with his natural acumen and experience, would serve him for the rest of his life. At sixteen, Moore found work in Texarkana, Texas, as a clerk in a general store, where he stayed for three years. Following his clerical work, Moore and his colleague Oliver K. High founded the Moore-High Shoe Company in Texarkana, in which he maintained a controlling interest for many years.

In 1900, Moore married the former Martha Susan Frost, the daughter and sister, respectively, of eminent Arkansas lumbermen Enoch Wesley Frost and Edwin Ambrose Frost. Randle and Susie had four children: Wesley Frost Moore, Virginia Elizabeth Moore Lewis, Edwin Ambrose Moore, and Randle Thomas Moore, Jr.

In 1901, Moore organized the Sabine Lumber Company in Zwolle, a community in Sabine Parish. The town only had about 275 inhabitants, and had been incorporated but two years earlier. As a result of his prominence in running the Frost Sawmill there, he also served as mayor. His interest in lumber was the direct result his marriage to Susan Martha Frost, whose father had founded the Frost-Trigg Lumber Company and, later, the Frost-Johnson Lumber Company. Moore subsequently became the president of the board of the company after the convalescence and death of his father-in-law. By 1905, Moore had left his father-in-law's company and taken over management of the DeSoto Land & Lumber Company, relocating his family to Mansfield, and taking a seat on the DeSoto Parish Police Jury

He had other business interests too, including the then-fledgling Kansas City Southern Railway, which acquired the Louisiana and Arkansas Railroad. In addition, he founded, owned, and operated the Commercial Building Company until 1956. He was also the vice president of both the City Savings Bank and Trust and the newly founded Commercial National Bank in Shreveport. He never forgot his roots in the lumber trade, however, and served as vice president of the Peavy-Byrnes Lumber Company, vice president of the Peavy-Moore Lumber Company, vice president of the Peavy-Wilson Lumber Company, vice president of the Bank of Commerce and Trust Company at Mansfield, vice President of the K. N.& W. Railway, vice president of the Sabine Neches Valley Railway, vice president of the Christie & Eastern Railway, vice president of the Louisiana State Life Insurance Company, treasurer and director of L. H. Gilmer Company of Louisiana, Inc., director of the Caddo-DeSoto Cotton Oil Company, and receiver for the Baird Company Department Store.

Moore served as a member of the board of trustees of the former Mansfield Female College and Methodist-affiliated Centenary College in Shreveport. He also served as president of the Shreveport chapter of the Boy Scouts of America, the president of the Shreveport Chamber of Commerce, president of the Desoto Parish Police Jury, financial director of the Louisiana State Southern Methodist Conference, director of Shreveport YMCA as well as director of the Louisiana Methodist Children's Home orphanage in Ruston, the seat of Lincoln Parish.
