= Thomas C. Thornton =

American Methodist minister (1794–1860)

Thomas C. Thornton (October 12, 1794 – March 22, 1860) was an American Methodist writer, minister and educator. Thornton was president of Centenary College of Louisiana from 1841 to 1844. He was also author of a proslavery tract, An Inquiry into the History of Slavery, published in 1841.

== Publications ==
=== books ===
- Thornton, Thomas C. (1843). Theological colloquies, or, A compendium of Christian divinity, speculative and practical, founded on Scripture and reason. Baltimore: Lewis & Coleman.
