= Rose Van Thyn =

Dutch Holocaust survivor

Rozette Lopes-Dias "Rose" Van Thyn
- Born: Rozette Lopes-Dias; September 19, 1921; Amsterdam, Netherlands
- Died: June 27, 2010 (aged 88); Shreveport, Louisiana, US
- Occupations: Holocaust activist, Seamstress
- Spouses: Moses Lezer (died in concentration camp); Louis Van Thyn (married 1946–2008, his death)
- Children: 2

Rozette Lopes-Dias Van Thyn (September 19, 1921 – June 27, 2010), known as Rose Van Thyn, was a Holocaust survivor of the Auschwitz concentration camp during World War II in Poland. She became a naturalized United States citizen residing in Shreveport, Louisiana. In addition to raising a family and working as a professional seamstress, she was active for forty years as a Holocaust educator. She spoke to thousands of children in Shreveport and as an academic fellow to college students about her experiences during the Holocaust.

== Biography ==
Van Thyn was born in Amsterdam in 1921. She originally attended Free University of Amsterdam, until she had to quit and start working in a factory. She and her family were Jewish. In 1942, when the Nazis occupied Amsterdam, her sister and brother-in-law were taken by German soldiers and then her father and first husband. Finally, Van Thyn and her mother were taken to Auschwitz, where Van Thyn was assigned inmate number 62511. They were placed on railroad cattle cars with nearly one hundred other people for three days with the men separated from the women. At Auschwitz, she underwent medical experiments, all performed without sedatives. She was one of two medical-experiment victims of Carl Clauberg's sterilization experiment who was interviewed in 2005 about the program. She lived in Block 10 of Auschwitz for two years. Later she was dispatched to Ravensbrueck and survived a "death march" at the end of the war. She was liberated by American soldiers on April 26, 1945.

Upon liberation Van Thyn discovered that both parents, a sister, and her husband, Mozes Lezer, were killed in the death camps. After she returned to the Netherlands, she met fellow survivor Louis Van Thyn, whose first wife was murdered in the Holocaust. Rose and Louis married in Amsterdam in 1946. The Van Thyns had a son and a daughter. The Van Thyns' 1956 immigration to the United States was sponsored by the Shreveport Jewish Federation and the family of Abe Gilbert. Van Thyn became a United States citizen in 1961.

A homemaker and professional seamstress, she was also active as a Holocaust educator for over three decades, wanting to tell her story to the world. She related her life story to civic groups, churches, and schools throughout northern Louisiana. She also spoke as an Attaway Fellow in Civic Culture to Centenary College students. During the 1990 election for a United States Senator from Louisiana she criticized Republican candidate David Duke who was then a State Representative and also a former Grand Wizard of the Ku Klux Klan, comparing him to Adolf Hitler.

In 2002, she was awarded an honorary Doctor of Humane Letters at Centenary's 2002 commencement exercises. In 2003, Louis and Rose Van Thyn were recognized for their civic support by the National Conference for Community and Justice, formerly known as the National Conference of Christians and Jews. She also received the Liberty Bell Award from the Shreveport Bar Association.

In 2008, her husband, Louis, died. Van Thyn died on June 27, 2010, at age 88. Shreveport mayor Cedric Glover expressed sorrow on Van Thyn's death: "It is a tremendous loss not just to Shreveport but to the entire world to know that someone who possessed the knowledge and experience and the history that she lived has now passed on."

In 2016, her son, Nico Van Thyn, released an independently published book about his parents' experience, titled Survivors: 62511, 70726: Two Holocaust stories, from Amsterdam to Auschwitz to America.

== Death and legacy ==
Centenary College has a Van Thyn Endowed Professorship Chair. Centenary College holds an Annual Rose and Louis Van Thyn Holocaust Lecture Series. An oral history interview with Van Thyn is on file at the United States Holocaust Memorial Museum. Other recordings of some of her speeches are archived by Louisiana State University Shreveport.
