= North American Association of Methodist Schools, Colleges and Universities =

North American Association of Methodist Schools, Colleges and Universities (NAAMSCU) is a private, not-for-profit organization of colleges and universities associated with the United Methodist Church. The UMC has more colleges, universities, theological schools and preparatory schools related to it than any other Protestant denomination, and 107 schools are currently listed as meeting the approved guidelines of the University Senate.

== History ==
Chartered as the National Association of Schools, Colleges and Universities of The United Methodist Church (NASCUMC) in 1976, the organization revised its mission and purpose, expanded its membership, and changed its name in 2020 under the leadership of President Scott D. Miller (also President of Virginia Wesleyan University) and Mark Hanshaw, Associate General Secretary of the General Board of Higher Education and Ministry (GBHEM).

NAAMSCU comprises 94 colleges and universities, 13 seminaries, 11 historically black institutions and several private secondary schools. Institutions are represented by the chief executive officer and chaplain.

NAAMSCU is a voluntary association of educational institutions that are related to The United Methodist Church in the United States, Canada and the Caribbean. It exists to: Advance the work of education and scholarship in member institutions. Work cooperatively with United Methodist conferences, boards and agencies to address issues of mutual concern to the church and the academy. Work in partnership with the church to educate students for leadership and service to the global community. Foster and encourage the common good of member institutions. Strengthen the collegiality and camaraderie among member presidents, deans and heads of schools.

NAAMSCU was founded by GBHEM and is assisted by GBHEM's Division of Higher Education. All the institutions are historically affiliated with the church and its organizations. Several institutions, but not all, are legally autonomous under their own boards of trustees and separately chartered by their respective states. The NAAMSCU seeks to enable Methodist-related educational institutions and those with a Methodist tradition to cooperate through the development of common understandings.

== US member schools ==
- Adrian College
- Alaska Pacific University
- Albion College
- Albright College
- Allegheny College
- American University
- Andrew College
- Baker University
- Baldwin Wallace University
- Bennett College
- Bethune-Cookman University
- Birmingham-Southern College
- Boston University
- Brevard College
- Centenary College of Louisiana
- Centenary University
- Central Methodist University
- Claflin University
- Clark Atlanta University
- Columbia College (South Carolina)
- Cornell College
- Dakota Wesleyan University
- University of Denver
- DePauw University
- Dickinson College
- Dillard University
- Drew University
- Duke University
- Emory University
- Emory and Henry University
- University of Evansville
- Ferrum College
- Florida Southern College
- Greensboro College
- Hamline University
- Hendrix College
- High Point University
- Huntingdon College
- Huston–Tillotson University
- Illinois Wesleyan University
- University of Indianapolis
- Kansas Wesleyan University
- Kendall College
- Kentucky Wesleyan College
- LaGrange College
- Lebanon Valley College
- Lindsey Wilson University
- Lon Morris College
- Louisburg College
- Lycoming College
- McKendree University
- McMurry University
- Meharry Medical College
- Methodist University
- Millsaps College
- Morningside University
- University of Mount Union
- Nebraska Methodist College
- Nebraska Wesleyan University
- North Carolina Wesleyan University
- North Central College
- Northwestern University
- Ohio Northern University
- Ohio Wesleyan University
- Oklahoma City University
- Otterbein University
- Oxford College of Emory University
- University of the Pacific
- Paine College
- Pfeiffer University
- Philander Smith University
- Randolph-Macon College
- Randolph College
- Reinhardt College
- Rocky Mountain College
- Rust College
- Shenandoah University
- Simpson College
- Southern Methodist University
- Southwestern College (Kansas)
- Southwestern University
- Spartanburg Methodist College
- Syracuse University
- Tennessee Wesleyan University
- Texas Wesleyan University
- Union Commonwealth University
- University of Puget Sound
- Virginia Wesleyan University
- Wesleyan College
- West Virginia Wesleyan College
- Wiley University
- Willamette University
- Wofford College
- Young Harris College

== US member seminaries ==
The United Methodist Church maintains 13 denominational seminaries which are funded, in part, by the Methodist Ministerial Education Fund. They are listed below:

Seminary	University	Date	Location
Drew Theological School	Drew University	1867	Madison, New Jersey
Candler School of Theology	Emory University	1914	Atlanta
Boston University School of Theology	Boston University	1839	Boston
Claremont School of Theology		1885	Claremont, California
Duke Divinity School	Duke University	1926	Durham, North Carolina
Garrett-Evangelical Theological Seminary		1853	Evanston, Illinois
Iliff School of Theology		1892	Denver
Methodist Theological School in Ohio		1956	Delaware, Ohio
Perkins School of Theology	Southern Methodist University	1911	University Park, Texas
Saint Paul School of Theology		1958	Overland Park, Kansas
United Theological Seminary		1871	Trotwood, Ohio
Wesley Theological Seminary		1882	Washington, D.C.
Gammon Theological Seminary		1958	Atlanta
