= Centenary College of Louisiana =

Private college in Shreveport, Louisiana, U.S.

- Former names: College of Louisiana (1825–1845); Centenary College (1839–1845)
- Motto: Labor Omnia Vincit (Latin)
- Motto in English: Work Conquers All
- Type: Private liberal arts college
- Established: 1825; 201 years ago
- Religious affiliation: United Methodist Church
- Academic affiliations: Associated Colleges of the South; Council of Independent Colleges; North American Association of Methodist Schools, Colleges and Universities
- Endowment: $157.9 million (fiscal year ending in 2025)
- President: Christopher L. Holoman
- Faculty: 56 full-time (fall 2024)
- Administrative staff: 115 (fall 2024)
- Students: 712 (fall 2024)
- Undergraduates: 693 (fall 2024)
- Postgraduates: 19 (fall 2024)
- Location: Shreveport, Louisiana, United States; 32.484°N 93.732°W
- Campus: Urban, 65 acres (26 ha)
- Colors: Maroon & white
- Nickname: Gentlemen & Ladies
- Sporting affiliations: NCAA Division III – SCAC
- Website: centenary.edu
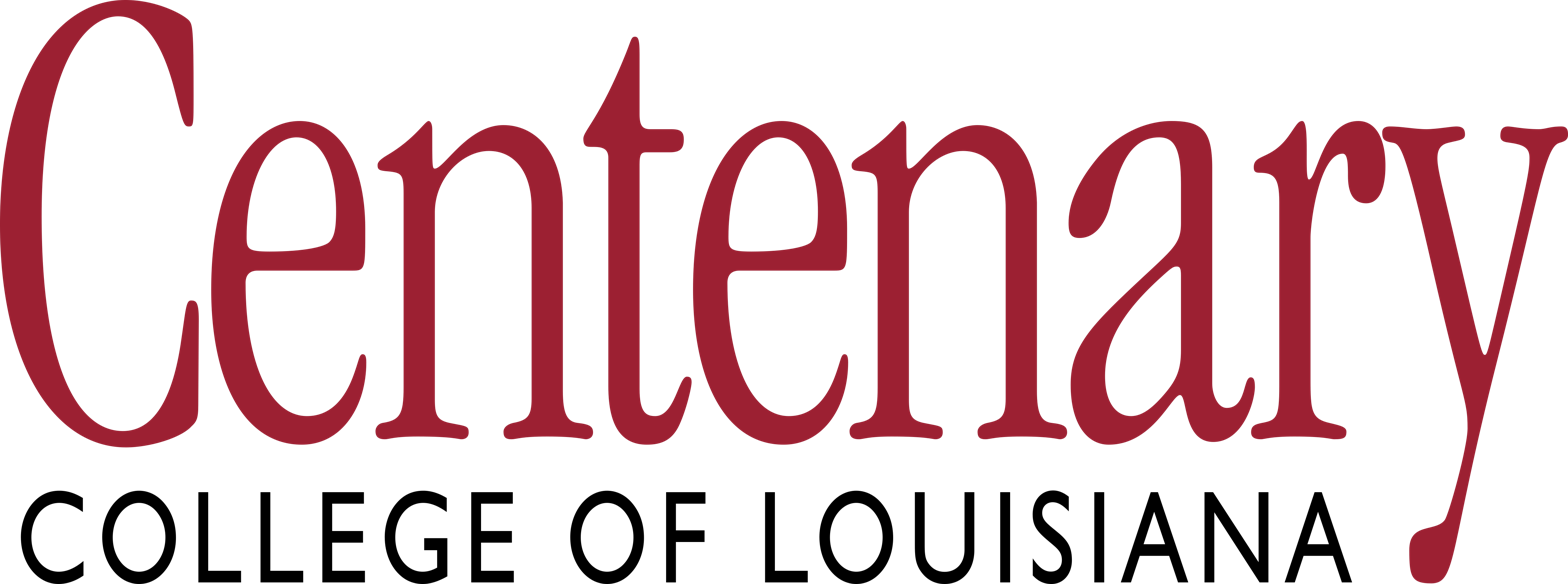

Centenary College of Louisiana is a private liberal arts college in Shreveport, Louisiana, United States. The college is affiliated with the United Methodist Church. Founded in 1825, it is the oldest chartered liberal arts college west of the Mississippi River and is accredited by the Southern Association of Colleges and Schools (SACS).

== History ==
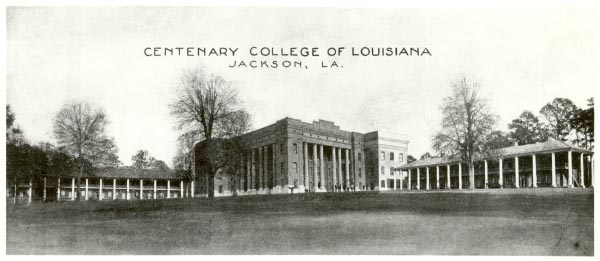
Centenary College in Jackson, Louisiana, circa 1900

Centenary College of Louisiana is the oldest college in Louisiana and is the nation's oldest chartered liberal arts college west of the Mississippi River. Centenary traces its origins to two earlier institutions. In 1825, the Louisiana state legislature issued a charter for the College of Louisiana at Jackson. Its curriculum included courses in English, French, Greek, Latin, logic, rhetoric, ancient and modern history, mathematics, and natural, moral, and political philosophy. In 1839, the Mississippi Conference of the Methodist Episcopal Church, South, established Centenary College, first located in Clinton, Mississippi, then relocated to Brandon Springs. When the College of Louisiana lost the financial support from the state legislature in 1845, Centenary College purchased the facility and moved to Jackson.

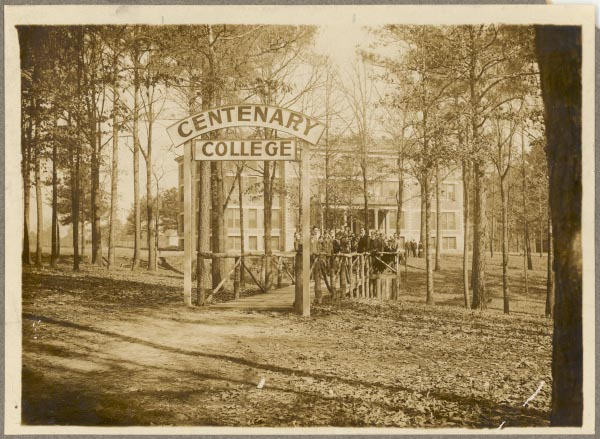
Centenary College in Shreveport, circa 1915

In 1846, the college's trustees changed the institution's name to Centenary College of Louisiana and adopted the alumni of the two predecessor colleges. During the 1850s, enrollment reached 260, and the college constructed a large central building, which included classrooms, laboratories, literary society rooms, a library, a chapel, offices, and an auditorium with seating for over 2,000 people. This prosperity halted with the American Civil War. Following a meeting on October 7, 1861, the faculty minute book states, "Students have all gone to war. College suspended; and God help the right!" During the war, both Confederate and Union troops occupied the campus’ buildings. Centenary reopened in the fall of 1865, though it struggled financially through the remainder of the nineteenth century. In 1906 the Louisiana Conference of the Methodist Episcopal Church, South, accepted an offer from the Shreveport Progressive League to relocate the college. The Jackson campus now serves as the Centenary State Historic Site operated by the Louisiana Office of State Parks; it is listed on the National Register of Historic Places.

Centenary opened in Shreveport, Louisiana, in 1908. Enrollment and course offerings increased during the 1920s, and Centenary received accreditation from the Southern Association of Colleges and Schools in 1925. During the 1920s and 1930s, the college's football program earned fame for defeating such teams as Baylor, LSU, Rice, SMU, and Texas A & M. The Centenary College Choir, formed in 1941, began performing throughout the region and eventually expanded to making national as well as international tours. In 1942, Centenary acquired Dodd College, which was a junior college for girls, and converted it into a satellite campus, which served as a pre-flight training facility for air force cadets. Following the Second World War, the college undertook many new construction projects – dormitories, a cafeteria, a science building, a religious education center, a chapel, an expanded student center, a library, a theater, and a music building.

=== Presidents ===
College of Louisiana (Jackson, Louisiana)

- Jeremiah Chamberlain (1826–1829)
- Henry H. Gird (1829–1834)
- James Shannon (1835–1840)
- William B. Lacey (1841–1845)

Centenary College (Brandon Springs, Mississippi)

- Thomas C. Thornton (1841–1844)

Centenary College of Louisiana (Jackson, Louisiana)

- David O. Shattuck (1844–1848)
- Augustus Baldwin Longstreet (1848–1849)
- Richard H. Rivers (1849–1853)
- John C. Miller (1855–1866)
- William H. Watkins (1866–1871)
- Charles G. Andrews (1871–1882)
- D. M. Rush (1882–1885)
- T. A. S. Adams (1885–1888)
- W. L. C. Hunnicutt (1888–1894)
- Charles W. Carter (1894–1898)
- Inman J. Cooper (1898–1902)
- Henry B. Carre (1902–1903)
- Charles C. Miller (1903–1906)

Centenary College of Louisiana (Shreveport, Louisiana)

- William Lander Weber (1907–1910)
- Felix R. Hill (1910–1913)
- Robert H. Wynn (1913–1918)
- W. R. Bourne (1919–1921)
- George Sexton (1921–1932)
- William Angie Smith (interim, 1932–1933)
- Pierce Cline (1933–1943)
- Joe J. Mickle (1945–1964)
- Jack Stauffer Wilkes (1964–1969)
- John Horton Allen (1969–1976)
- Donald A. Webb (1977–1991)
- Kenneth L. Schwab (1991–2009)
- B. David Rowe (2009–2016)
- Christopher L. Holoman (2016–present)

== Campus ==
Centenary College's campus spans sixty-five acres and is located two miles south of downtown Shreveport. The Dr. Ed Leuck Academic Arboretum, located in the heart of campus, is home to more than 300 species of plant life.

=== Major buildings ===
- The Anderson Choral Building, named in memory of G. M. "Jake" and Dr. Gertie Anderson, longtime trustees and benefactors of the college, the building houses the Nancy Mikell Carruth Choir Room, the Dr. Alberta E. Broyles Choral Room, and the Harvey and Alberta Broyles Choral Lounge. The Anderson building also contains a soundproof practice room and atrium.
- The Brown Memorial Chapel was erected in 1955, after a gift was made by the late Paul M. Brown, Jr., Chairman Emeritus of the Board of Trustees, and his brother, Colonel S. Perry Brown, a life member of the Board, in honor of their parents. The chapel was renovated and rededicated in January 2003 and hosts religious services and special events.
- Bynum Memorial Commons, the cafeteria, built in 1956, was named in 1974 to honor Robert Jesse Bynum, New Orleans businessman and benefactor of the college. A generous grant from the Frost Foundation funded a 2006 renovation of the entire building, including the Edwin Frost Whited Room and the Centenary Alumni Hall of Fame.
- The Gold Dome, completed in 1971, is a physical education facility. The geodesic dome has a capacity of 3,000 and serves as the home basketball and volleyball court and gymnastics arena. After a recent renovation in 2011, the Gold Dome features a new hardwood painted floor, updated sub-floor electronics, premium seating, and a new Hi-Fi public address system.
- Hamilton Hall, the administration building completed in 1971, was largely the result of gifts by the late Mr. and Mrs. David Philip Hamilton. Mrs. Hamilton was a trustee of the college and a member of the first Centenary class to graduate in Shreveport.
- The Hargrove Memorial Amphitheatre was a gift of Mrs. R. H. Hargrove and her children and was built in memory of her husband, Mr. Reginald H. Hargrove. It is used for convocations, plays, and concerts.
- The Meadows Museum of Art, established in 1975, was created from the gift of Centenary alumnus Algur H. Meadows. After donating 360 works by the French artist Jean Despujols, Meadows also provided funding to renovate the former administrative building into a museum. The museum's permanent collection now includes around 1500 works by various artists and regularly hosts exhibits that aim to educate students and the public on the importance of art.
- The John F. Magale Memorial Library, commonly shortened to Magale Library, was built in 1963 with the donation from the Magale Foundation. It provides students with access to many academic and student resources, free printing, study areas, tutoring, and more. The library building also contains the Centenary Archives and the Learning Commons. The emblem for Centenary College of Louisiana contains the signature bell tower that sits atop the Magale Library.
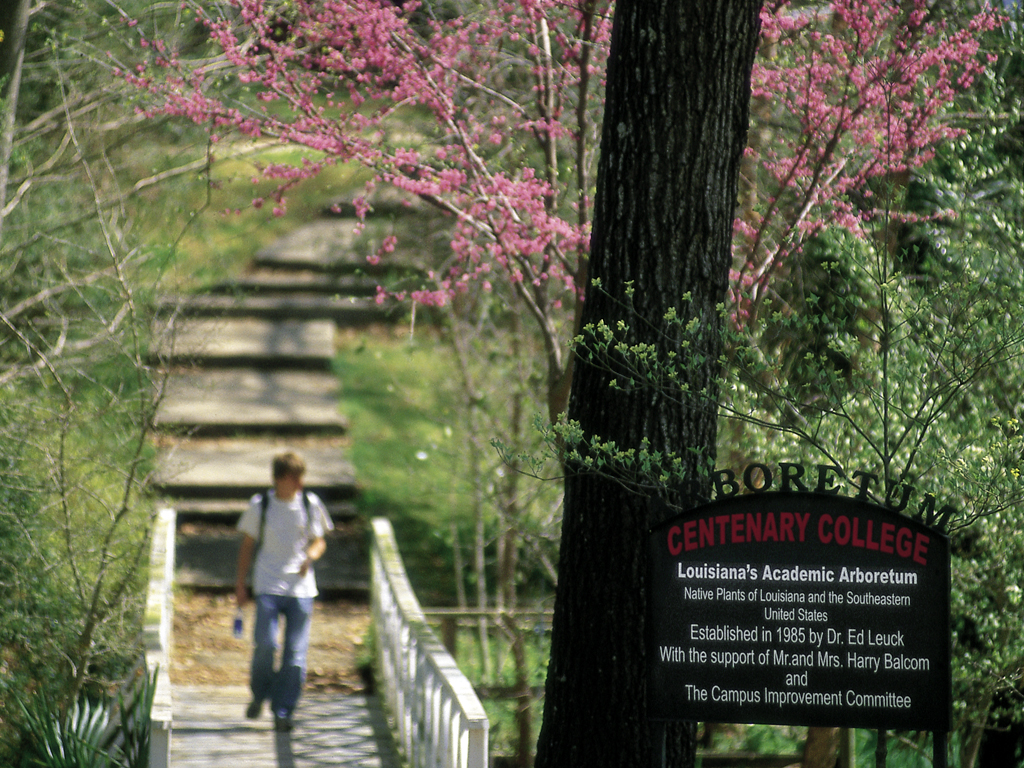
Arboretum Bridge, located in the heart of campus

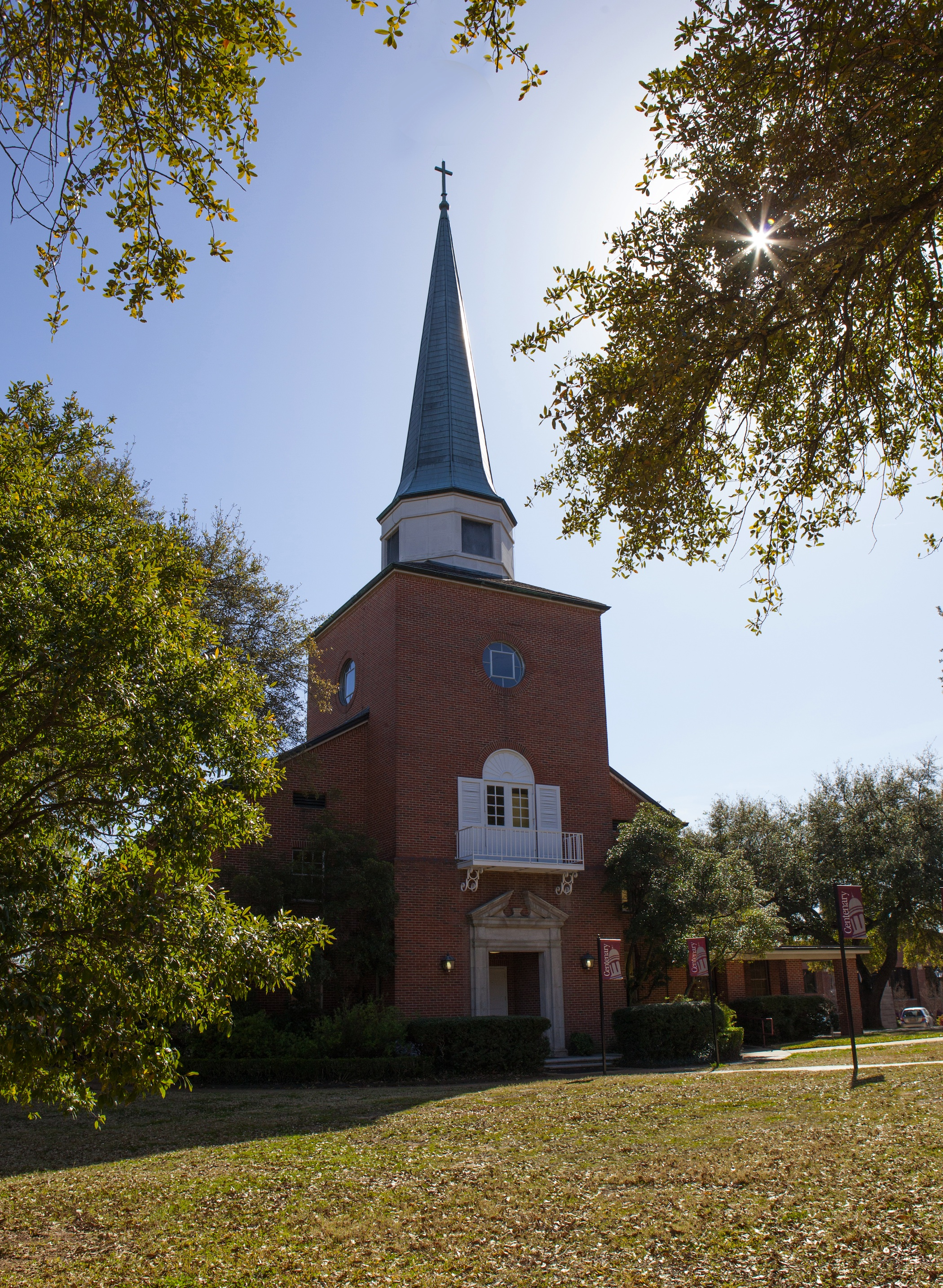
Brown Memorial Chapel

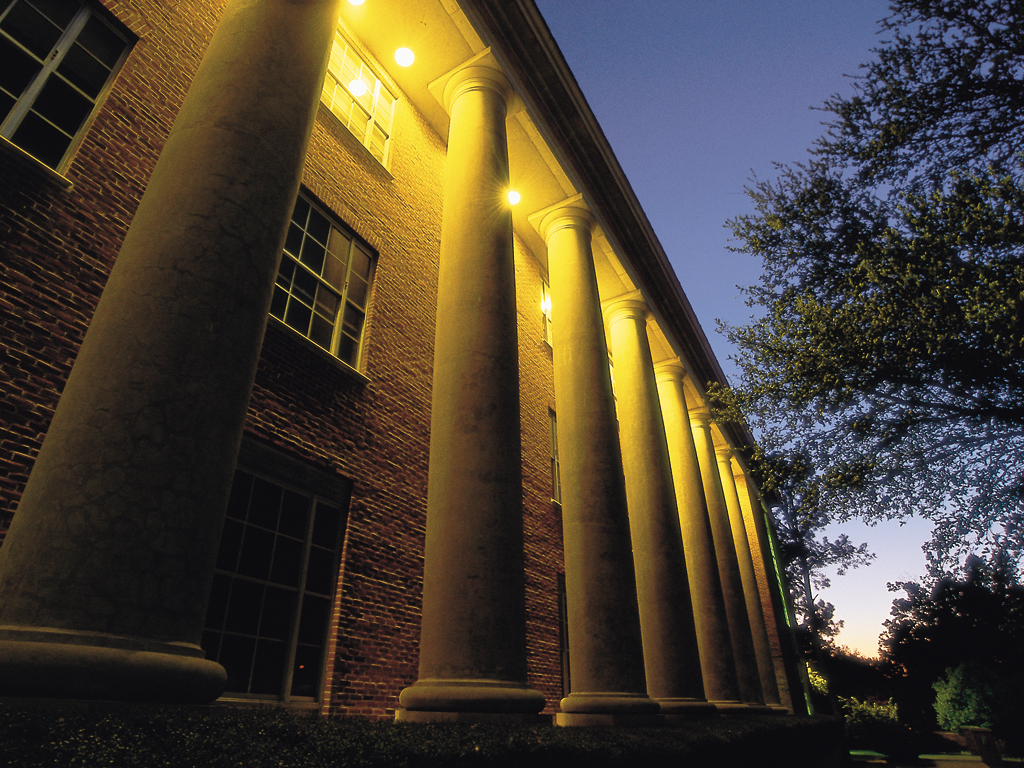
Mickle Hall: Home of natural and physical science

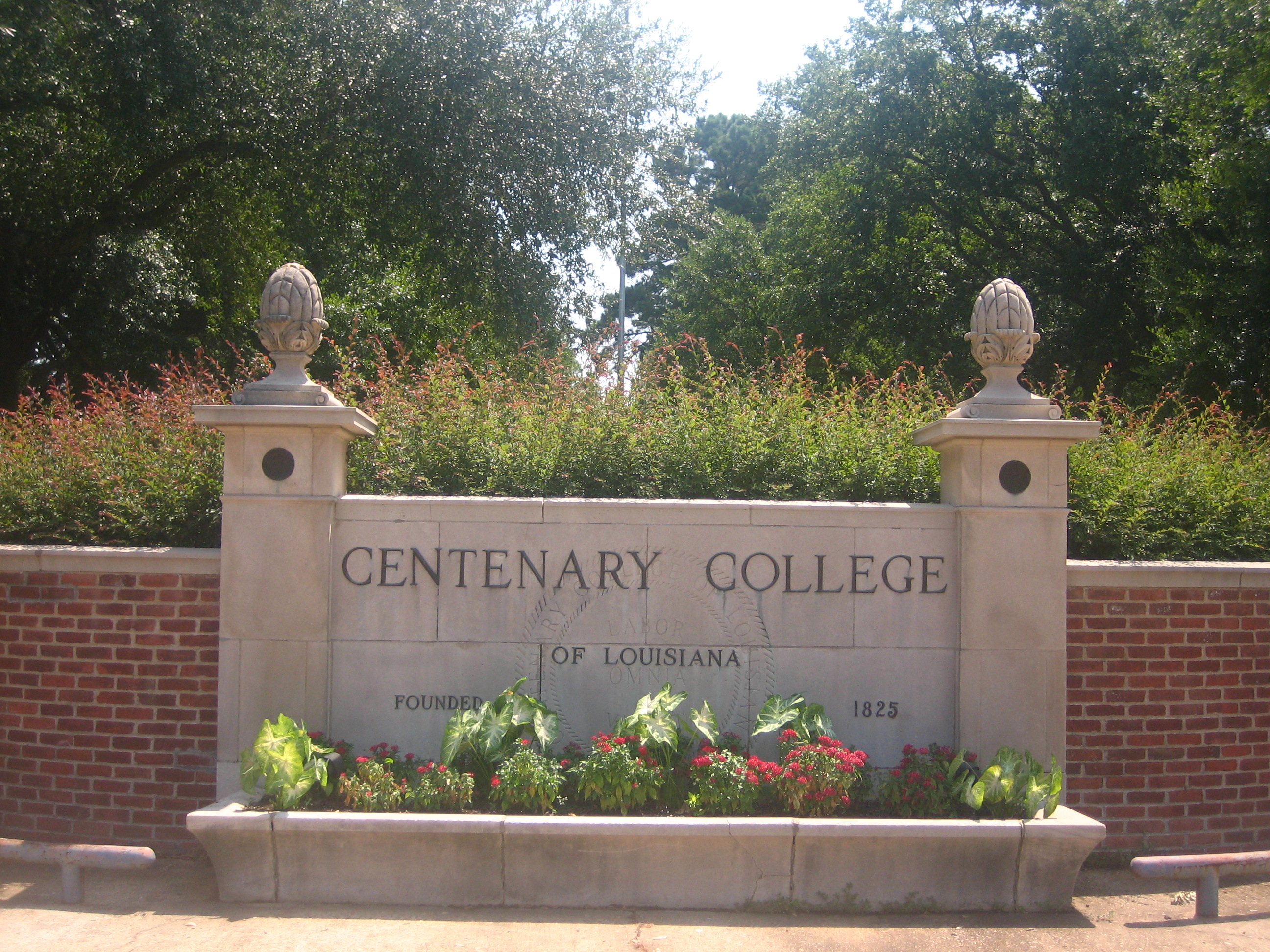
Entrance to Centenary College

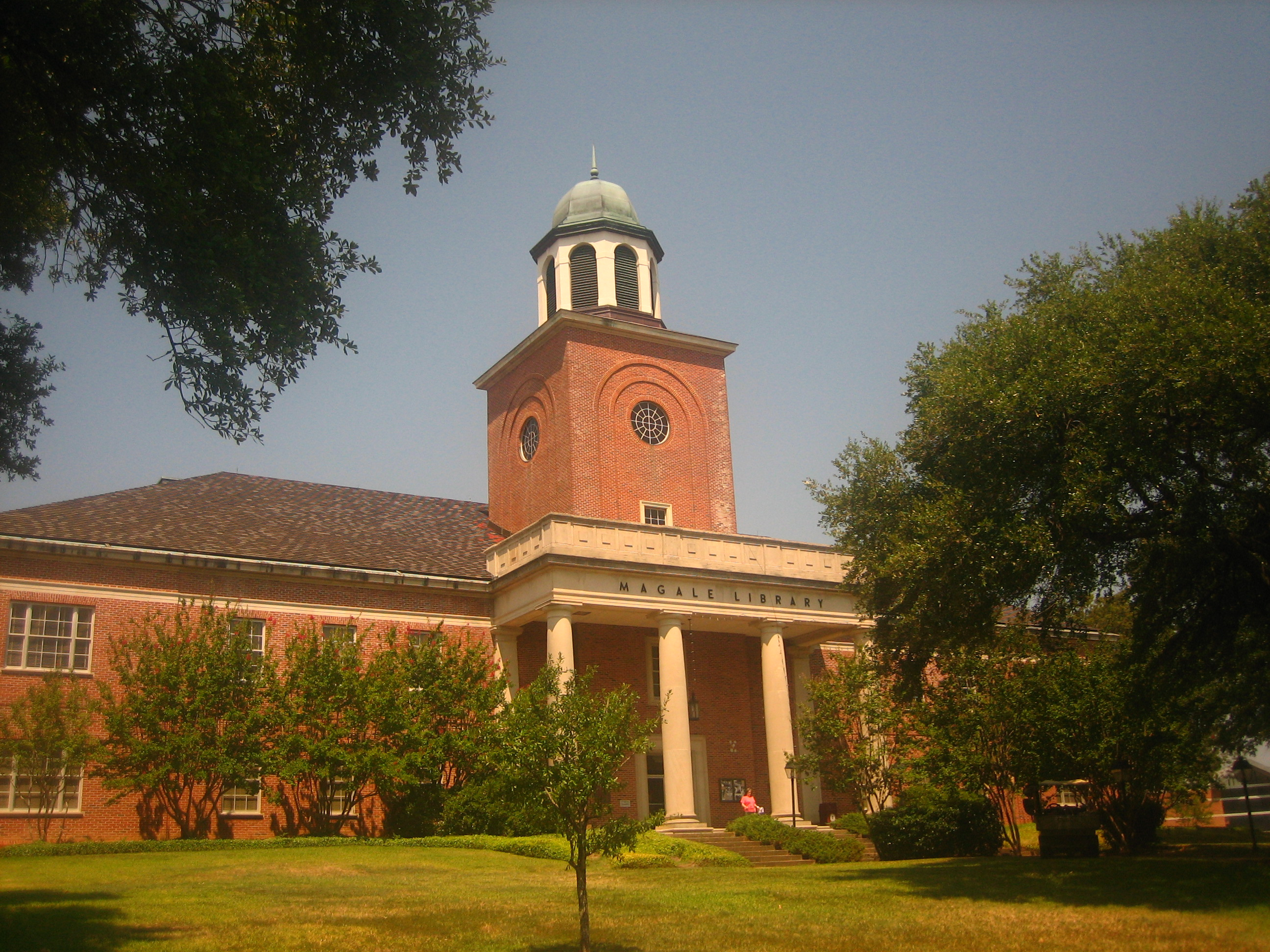
Magale Library at Centenary College

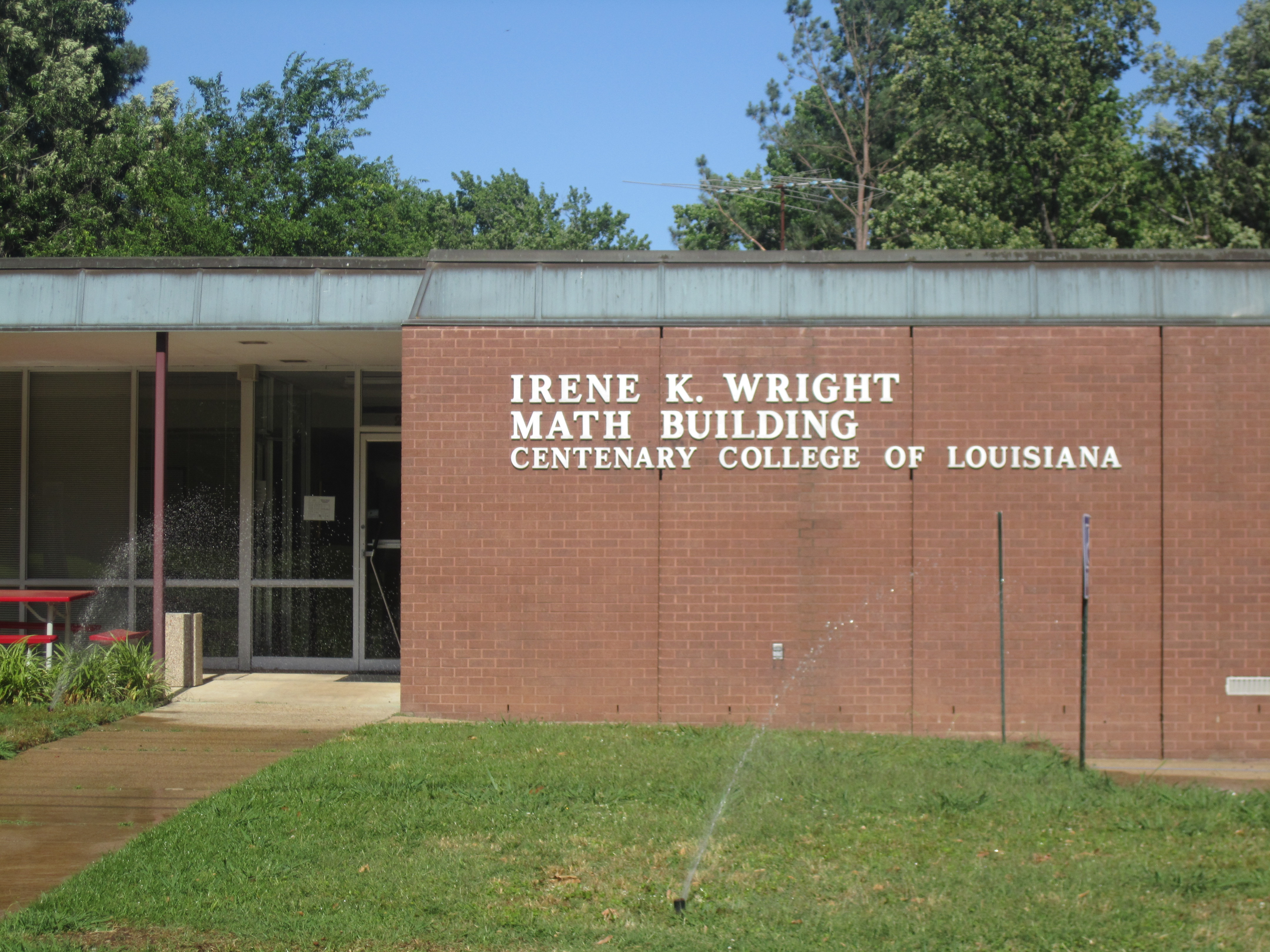
Irene K. Wright Mathematics Building

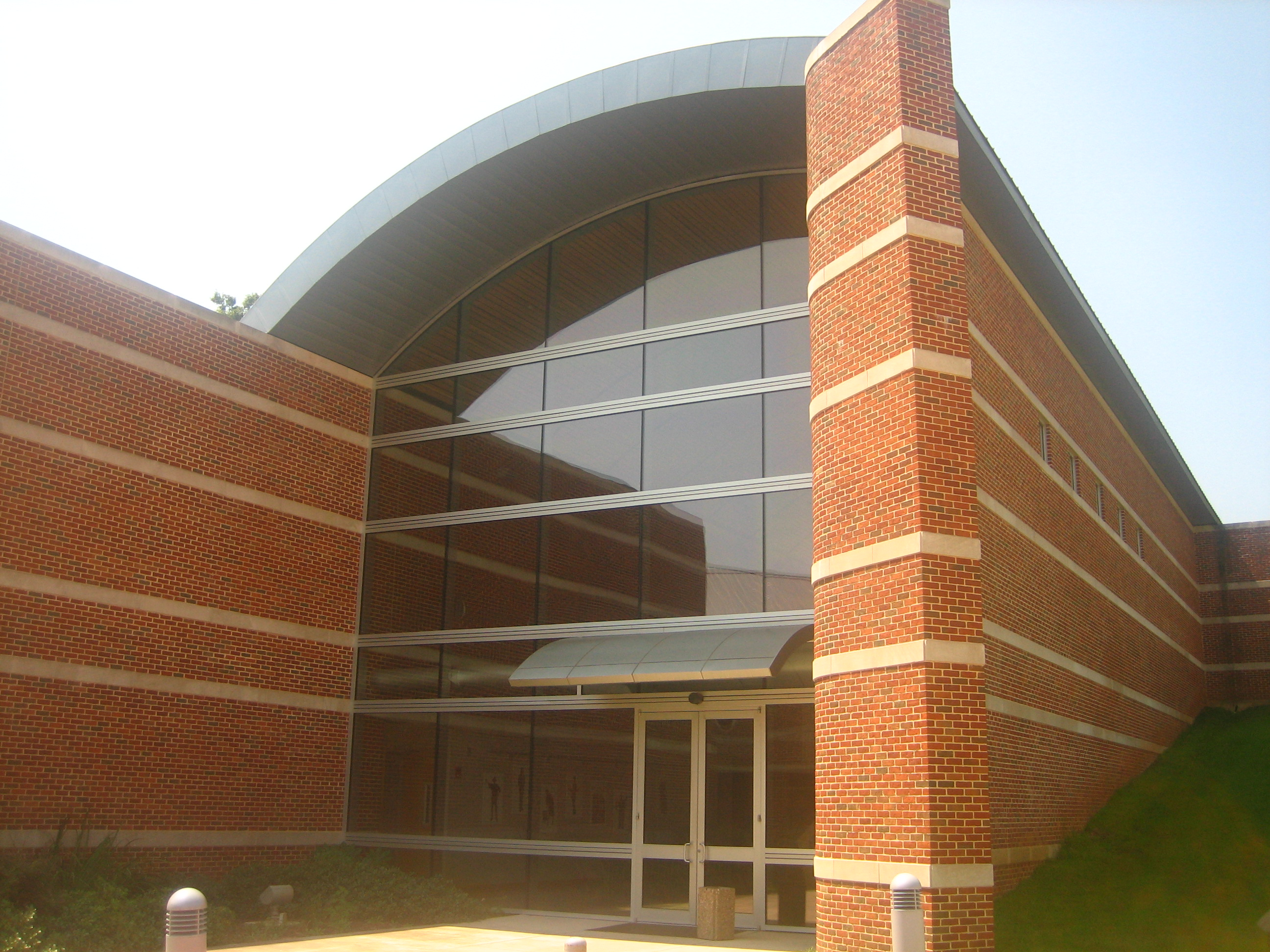
Anderson Choral Building

== Academics ==
Academic rankings

Liberal arts
- U.S. News & World Report: 136
- Washington Monthly: 133

National
- Forbes: 584

Centenary is a liberal arts college offering Bachelor of Arts and Bachelor of Science degrees in 29 majors, along with 31 minors and several pre-professional programs. It also offers three master's degrees. The college reports a student-to-faculty ratio of 9:1.

Centenary is accredited by the Southern Association of Colleges and Schools Commission on Colleges to award bachelor's and master's degrees. Its music program is accredited by the National Association of Schools of Music.

=== Curriculum ===
In addition to a core curriculum spanning the humanities, natural sciences, social sciences, and visual and performing arts, students complete Trek, an experiential curriculum the college has used for more than 25 years. Trek begins in the first year with Credo, a course on personal values and goals, and Centenary in Paris, a faculty-led program in Paris. Later requirements fall under three areas: Career, Community (civic engagement), and Culture (global engagement, including study abroad).

Other study abroad options include faculty-led May Module courses and semester or year-long exchanges with more than ten partner universities and consortia.

=== Graduate programs ===
The Frost School of Business offers a Master of Business Administration organized in five ten-week terms per year. The Master of Arts in Teaching leads to Louisiana teacher certification in elementary, secondary, and K–12 choral music education; through the Education Aspire 4+1 program, undergraduates may begin M.A.T. coursework before completing their bachelor's degree. A hybrid, 36-credit-hour Master of Educational Leadership (M.Ed.) for prospective school and district administrators began in August 2026.

=== Pre-professional programs and partnerships ===
Centenary offers pre-professional preparation in medicine, dentistry, pharmacy, veterinary medicine, nursing, allied health, and law, as well as a 3-2 dual degree program in engineering. In a cooperative 3+2 program with LSU Health Shreveport, psychology students complete a Bachelor of Science at Centenary in three years and a Master of Communication Disorders in speech–language pathology at LSU Health Shreveport in two; qualifying students are guaranteed admission to the graduate program. Through the Medical Scholars Program, students spend five weeks in the summer shadowing medical professionals at Willis-Knighton Health System.

The college has admission or interview agreements with graduate and professional programs including LSU Law, the William H. Bowen School of Law, the Edward Via College of Osteopathic Medicine, the Clinton School of Public Service, Perkins School of Theology, LSU Health Shreveport's School of Health Professions and Sciences, and master of public health programs at Tulane University and Louisiana State University Shreveport. Nursing pathways include agreements with Baylor University, LSU Health Sciences Center New Orleans, and Northwestern State University.

== Athletics ==
Centenary athletics logo

Centenary is currently a member of the NCAA Division III's Southern Collegiate Athletic Conference (SCAC), having moved from the American Southwest Conference (ASC) after the 2011–12 academic year. Prior to July 2011, the college was a member of The Summit League in NCAA Division I.

Centenary fields 20 intercollegiate athletic teams including football, baseball, basketball, cross country, golf, lacrosse, soccer, and swimming for men; and basketball, cross country, golf, gymnastics, soccer, softball, swimming, tennis, and volleyball for women.

Centenary College of Louisiana had previously fielded a football team from 1909 to 1947. On November 10, 2021, the college announced that it would be reviving its football team. The team began play during the 2024 college football season. www.gocentenary.com

== Press ==
Les Éditions Tintamarre, a publishing house devoted to works in Louisiana French and Louisiana Creole, operates under the auspices of the college press.

== Notable people ==
=== Alumni ===
- Nathan Allen (Class of 1967) – trial lawyer
- Lonnie O. Aulds (Class of 1950) – Louisiana state representative
- Brady Blade (Class of 1989) – musician
- Sherri Smith Buffington (attended 1984–1985) – member of the Louisiana State Senate
- Riemer Calhoun (Class of 1930) – member of the Louisiana State Senate
- John Prentiss Carter (Class of 1860) – Lieutenant Governor of Mississippi
- John William Corrington (Class of 1956) – poet
- George W. D'Artois (attended 1948–1951) – public safety commissioner
- Taylor Scott Davis (Class of 2004) – musician and composer
- George Dement (1922–2014, attended 1946–1949) – mayor of Bossier City
- John Allen Dixon (Class of 1940) – judge
- E. John Ellis (attended 1855-1857) – US representative
- Edgar Z. Friedenberg (Class of 1938) – sociologist
- Davidson Garrett (attended 1970–1972) – poet, actor, "King Lear of the Taxi"
- Arnold Hardy (Class of 1946) – first amateur photographer to win the Pulitzer Prize for Photography
- John Spencer Hardy (Class of 1938) – lieutenant general
- Lovette Hill (Class of 1935) – baseball coach
- Arlene Howell (attended 1957-1959) – actress and beauty pageant titleholder
- James Hoyt (Class of 2010) – baseball player
- Cal Hubbard (attended 1922–1925) – football player
- Wellborn Jack (Class of 1931) – Louisiana politician
- Whitfield Jack (attended 1924) – attorney and major general
- Josh Johnson (1990–, Class of 2012) – television writer and comedian
- Kathy Johnson (1959–, attended 1977–1979) – gymnast
- Herbert "Flight Time" Lang (Class of 1998) – basketball player for the Harlem Globetrotters
- Clyde Lee (Class of 1932) – football coach
- Seth Lugo (attended 2008–2011) – baseball player
- James M. McCoy (Class of 1966) – Air Force officer
- Charlotte Moorman (Class of 1955) – performance artist
- Robert Parish (Class of 1976) – Hall of Fame basketball player
- Buddy Parker (attended 1932–1935) – football player
- Charles Parlange (attended 1866-1868, honorary Master of Arts 1877) – Lieutenant Governor of Louisiana
- Clarence Cullam Pope (Class of 1950) – bishop
- Susan W. Pope (Class of 1963) – politician
- Edward White Robertson – US representative
- Robert Schneider (attended 1989–1991) – musician and mathematician
- Versha Sharma (Class of 2008) – editor
- Virginia Shehee (Class of 1943) – businesswoman and philanthropist
- Oramel H. Simpson (Class of 1890) – governor of Louisiana
- Hal Sutton (Class of 1981) – golfer
- Cecil Upshaw (Class of 1965) – baseball player
- Jeffrey P. Victory – judge
- Steve Weddle (Class of 1992) – poet and author
- Victoria Williams (attended 1976–1977) – musician
- Louise Yazbeck (1910–1995, attended 1924–1925 and 1930–1931) – composer
- J. Smith Young (1834–1916, Class of 1855) – US representative

=== Faculty and staff ===
- William Marbury Carpenter – faculty 1837–1842, natural scientist
- Earle Labor – faculty 1955–1962 and 1966–2008, official biographer of novelist Jack London; curator of the Jack London Museum in Shreveport
- Arthur C. Morgan – faculty 1928–1933, sculptor

=== Other ===
- Solomon W. Downs (honorary Doctor of Laws 1851) – attorney and politician
- Murphy J. Foster (honorary Doctor of Laws 1893) – governor of Louisiana
- Charles Gayarré (honorary Master of Arts 1852) – historian, attorney, and politician
- Eldred Kurtz Means (honorary Doctor of Divinity 1925) – pastor
- Rose Van Thyn (1921–2010, honorary Doctor of Humane Letters 2002) – Holocaust survivor; Attaway Fellow in Civic Culture; Van Thyn Endowed Professorship
