= Southern art =

Art in the Southern United States

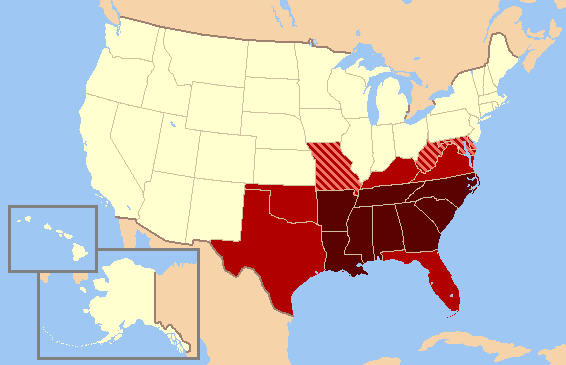
17 states and Washington, D.C. are defined as the Southern region of the United States.

Art from Southern United States, or Southern art, includes Southern expressionism, folk art, and modernism.

The Ogden Museum of Southern Art in New Orleans houses the largest single collection of Southern art. In 1992, the Morris Museum of Art opened to the public in Augusta, Georgia, with a focus on mid-twentieth century American Southern art. The Johnson Collection in South Carolina holds 1,200 pieces of Southern art that it exhibits, publishes in catalogs, and lends to other institutions.

Rowan Nathaniel House offers a fine example of Southern art. He was a Mississippi native whose artwork frequently portrayed southern life, in particular, that of former slaves and their role in the south of the early 20th century.

In 1975, Southern Arts Federation, now South Arts, was founded with funding from the National Endowment for the Arts to support and promote arts and culture in the Southeast.
