= Steve Weddle =

American author

Steve Weddle is an American author, best known for his book "Country Hardball," which the New York Times called "downright dazzling." He is the co-founder (with Jay Stringer) of the crime fiction collective Do Some Damage, the co-creator (with John Hornor Jacobs) of the noir magazine Needle, and a regular instructor at LitReactor.

== Early life ==
Weddle received his undergraduate degree from Centenary College of Louisiana, his Master of Arts from Pittsburg State University, and his Master of Fine Arts in Poetry from Louisiana State University.

== Career ==
After graduating from Louisiana State University, Weddle taught college and worked as a journalist. Weddle said that he began writing fiction because he was a "terrible student" and cites Raymond Carver and Ernest Hemingway among his influences. Weddle's first novel was completed in 2008 and he signed with the Donald Maass Literary Agency. His short story "Cyborg Lesbian Vampire Assassins" appeared in the anthology "Both Barrels," published by Shotgun Honey. Weddle's stories have appeared in a number of magazines and anthologies and his Roy Alison novel "Country Hardball" was published by Tyrus Books in 2013. Publishers Weekly called the book "gritty."The follow-up story, "South of Bradley," appeared in Playboy magazine in 2015. Weddle has said that he is working on a new novel with the same family, set in 1933.

== Works ==
=== Roy Alison stories ===
- Country Hardball (2013)
- "South of Bradley" (2015)
- Le Bon Fils (2016)

=== Anthologies ===
Weddle's short stories have appeared in the following collections.

- "Terminal Damage" (2010)
- "Discount Noir" (2010)
- "Crime Factory: The First Shift" (2011)
- "Collateral Damage" (2011)
- "D*cked: Dark Fiction Inspired by Dick Cheney" (2011)
- "Protectors" (2012)
- "Both Barrels" (2012)
- "Feeding Kate" (2012)
- "Beat to a Pulp: Superhero" (2012)
- "Trouble in the Heartland: Crime Fiction Inspired by Bruce Springsteen" (2014)
- "Murder-A-Go-Go's" (2019)
- "Lockdown" (2020)

== Personal life ==
Weddle lives with his family in Virginia.
