= Tom Adams =

Tom or Tommy Adams may refer to:

- Tom Adams (actor) (1938–2014), English actor
- Tom Adams (cricketer) (1808–1894), English cricketer
- Thomas Burton Adams Jr. (1917–2006), American politician in Florida, known as Tom
- Tom Adams (illustrator) (1926–2019), American illustrator
- Tom Adams (bluegrass musician) (born 1958), American bluegrass musician
- Tom Adams (politician) (1931–1985), Prime Minister of Barbados, real name Jon Adams
- Tommy Adams (criminal) (born 1958), Clerkenwell crime syndicate
- Tommy Adams (footballer) (1916–1984), Scottish footballer
- Tom Adams (Canadian football) (born 1934), Canadian football end
- Tommy Adams (basketball) (born 1980), American basketball player
- Tom Adams (American football) (born 1940), American football player

== See also ==
- Thomas Adams (disambiguation)
- Adams (surname)
