= Lloyd Hendrick =

American lawyer and politician

Lloyd Leroy Hendrick

Louisiana State Senator for DeSoto and Caddo parishes
- In office 1940–1948
- Preceded by: Two-member district: J. C. Heard Roscoe C. Cranor
- Succeeded by: Riemer Calhoun; Charles Emery Tooke, Jr.

Personal details
- Born: October 30, 1908 Natchitoches Parish, Louisiana, USA
- Died: April 25, 1951 (aged 42) Baton Rouge, Louisiana
- Resting place: Forest Park East Cemetery in Shreveport, Louisiana
- Party: Democratic
- Spouse: Gladys Pitts Hendrick
- Parent(s): Dr. Thaddeus Albert and Eva Lena McFerren Hendrick
- Education: Belcher High School; Tulane University Law School
- Occupation: Lawyer

Military service
- Battles/wars: World War II

Lloyd Leroy Hendrick (October 30, 1908 – April 25, 1951) was a lawyer in Shreveport, Louisiana, who served from 1940 to 1948 as a member of the Louisiana State Senate from a combined Caddo and DeSoto parish district. His tenure paralleled the administrations of Governors Sam Houston Jones and Jimmie Davis.

Hendrick was born in Natchitoches Parish to Dr. Thaddeus Albert Hendrick (1878-1956) and the former Eva Lena McFerren (1882-1925). Hendrick graduated from Belcher High School in Belcher in Caddo Parish and Tulane University Law School in New Orleans.

His stepmother was the former Mary Lillian Harp (1900-2000). Hendrick was married to the former Gladys Pitts (1902-1979).

== Political career ==
Hendrick died in the capital city of Baton Rouge at the age of forty-two.

Political offices
Preceded by Two-member district: J. C. Heard Roscoe C. Cranor	Louisiana State Senator for DeSoto and Caddo parishes Lloyd L. Hendrick (alongside Joe T. Cawthorn and Riemer Calhoun); 1940 – 1948	Succeeded by Riemer Calhoun; Charles Emery Tooke, Jr.
