= Riemer Calhoun =

American politician

Maurice Riemer Calhoun, Sr.

Louisiana State Senator for DeSoto and Caddo parishes (now District 38)
- In office 1944–1952
- Preceded by: Lloyd Hendrick; Joe T. Cawthorn
- Succeeded by: B. H. "Johnny" Rogers; Charles Emery Tooke, Jr.

Personal details
- Born: April 5, 1909 Place of birth missing
- Died: August 4, 1994 (aged 85) Mansfield, Louisiana, U.S.
- Party: Democratic Party
- Spouse(s): (1) Clista Andrews Calhoun (married 1933–1952, her death) (2) Evelyn Hope Ryder Calhoun (married c. 1955-1994, his death)
- Children: From first marriage: Riemer Calhoun, Jr. Carolyn C. Huckabay Thomas Allen Calhoun
- Parent(s): Murry A. and Ruby Calhoun
- Education: Centenary College of Louisiana
- Occupation: Businessman; farmer

Maurice Riemer Calhoun Sr. (April 5, 1909 – August 4, 1994), was Louisiana politician who served in the Louisiana State Senate as a Democrat from 1944 to 1952, representing parts of DeSoto and Caddo parish.

Calhoun later managed the 1952 presidential campaign in DeSoto Parish for Republican presidential nominee Dwight D. Eisenhower, who won the parish, but lost the electoral vote of Louisiana.

Political offices
Preceded by Lloyd Hendrick; Joe T. Cawthorn	Louisiana State Senator for DeSoto and Caddo parishes Maurice Riemer Calhoun, Sr. (alongside Lloyd Hendrick in first term and Charles Emery Tooke, Jr., in second term); 1944–1952	Succeeded by B. H. "Johnny" Rogers; Charles Emery Tooke, Jr.
