= Aubrey K. Lucas =

American academic

Aubrey Keith Lucas
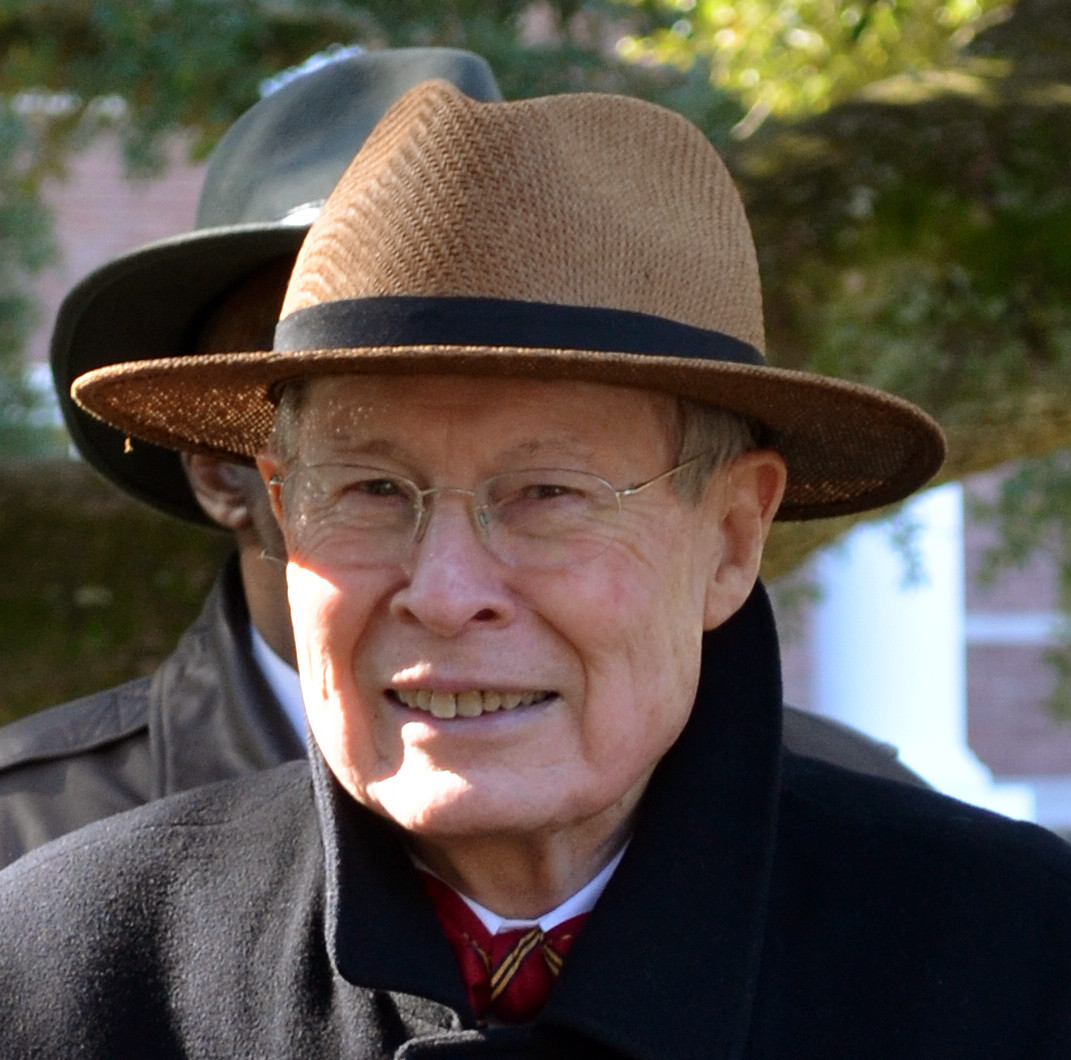
- Aubrey K. Lucas at the Mississippi Freedom Trail Marker Unveiling at the University of Southern Mississippi on February 2, 2018

President of the University of Southern Mississippi
- In office 1975–1997
- Preceded by: William D. McCain
- Succeeded by: Horace W. Fleming, Jr.

Personal details
- Children: Frances Lucas
- Education: University of Southern Mississippi (B.S, M.A); Florida State University (Ph.D)
- Profession: President Emeritus

Dr. Aubrey K. Lucas is an American academician, and the former president and current president emeritus of the University of Southern Mississippi. Lucas received his Bachelor of Science and Master of Arts degrees from the University of Southern Mississippi and attained his PhD from Florida State University. In 1975, Lucas became the 6th president of the University of Southern Mississippi. He also served as chair of the American Association of Colleges and Universities and on the board of the American Council on Education.

== Delta State University ==
Lucas served as the fourth president of Delta State University in Cleveland, Mississippi from 1971 to 1975. Striving to increase and improve Delta State’s credibility as a reputable institution of higher learning, one of Dr. Lucas’ goals was to improve academic programs. He worked closely with the National Council Accreditation for Teacher Education. In 1973, the Southern Association of Colleges and Schools reaccredited Delta State. In 1974, Delta State College became known as Delta State University. During Dr. Lucas’ tenure, there were two major gifts made to the Delta State University Foundation–the Nellie Nugent Somerville Lecture Series on Government and Public Affairs and for the West Carillon. Also, the women’s basketball program was revived. The Lady statesmen won their first national championship in 1975.

== University of Southern Mississippi ==
On July 1, 1975, Dr. Aubrey Keith Lucas became the sixth president of the University of Southern Mississippi, having served as instructor, director of admissions, registrar, and dean of the Graduate School, in addition to holding both bachelor's and master's degrees from the school. Among the accomplishments that punctuated the Lucas years were the formation of the Teaching and Learning Resource Center; creation of the Faculty Senate; establishment of the Center for International Education; replacement of the quarter system with the semester system; creation of the Polymer Science Institute; reorganization of the university’s 10 schools into six colleges; formation of the Institute for Learning in Retirement; and affiliation with the new athletic conference, Conference USA. After 21 years, Dr. Lucas stepped down from the presidency on December 31, 1996, saying it was time for someone new. In July 2001, Lucas was again called upon by his university. Lucas served as acting president upon the resignation of Dr. Horace Fleming until the search for a new president could be completed. In May 2012, at the resignation of Dr. Martha Saunders, Dr. Lucas agreed again to serve as interim president until the search for a new president was completed. He was succeeded by Rodney D. Bennett, the first African-American appointed to lead a historically white institution of higher learning in Mississippi.

== Community work ==
Lucas is active in civic and charitable organizations as well as the United Methodist Church. He served as the lay leader for the Mississippi Conference from 2000 to 2004 and has served on the General Board of Higher Education and Ministry, the General Board of Global Ministries of the United Methodist Church, and on the board of directors of Africa University in Zimbabwe. He has served as chair of the Center for Ministry at Millsaps College. Along with other Methodist visionaries who studied at Southern during the 1950s, Lucas attributes great influence to the teachings and leadership of the Rev. Sam S Barefield, Jr, who was at that time Wesley Foundation director of Southern.

Lucas served as chair of the Lauren Rogers Museum of Art board of trustees, chair of the Hattiesburg Salvation Army advisory board, chair of the Mississippi Arts Commission; chair of the Mississippi Institute of Arts and Letters; chair of the board of directors of the Hattiesburg Area Community Foundation, and has served on the Mississippi Humanities Council. He is a member of the Hattiesburg Convention Center Commission.
