= Charles Emery Tooke Jr. =

American politician

Louisiana State Senator from Desoto and Caddo parishes
- In office 1948–1956
- Preceded by: Riemer Calhoun; Lloyd Hendrick
- Succeeded by: B. H. "Johnny" Rogers; Jackson B. Davis

Personal details
- Born: July 19, 1912 DeRidder; Beauregard Parish; Louisiana, USA
- Died: September 1986 (aged 74) Shreveport, Louisiana
- Resting place: Forest Park Cemetery in Shreveport
- Party: Democratic
- Spouse: Lucia Francis Von Beck Tooke (m. 1945; died 1981)
- Children: Catherine Castro Tooke McVea; Elizabeth Roberts Tooke Madole; Sarah (Sally) Bell Tooke Haynie; Marjorie Claire Tooke Gholson; Patricia Ann Tooke Lloyd; Charles Emery Tooke, III
- Education: Louisiana Tech University; Tulane University Law School
- Occupation: Lawyer

Military service
- Branch/service: United States Navy; United States Naval Reserve
- Rank: Lieutenant commander, United States Navy Reserve; Air Intelligence;Officer Fleet Air Wing Two; Minecraft; Military Government, Guam in Pacific Theater of Operations
- Battles/wars: Midway in World War II

Charles Emery Tooke Jr. (July 19, 1912 – September 1986) was an attorney from Shreveport, Caddo Parish, Louisiana, who served as a Democrat in the Louisiana State Senate from 1948 to 1956, alongside, first, Riemer Calhoun and, then, B. H. "Johnny" Rogers, both of DeSoto Parish.

Tooke was born in DeRidder in Beauregard Parish in southwestern Louisiana, to Charles Emery Tooke Sr. (1880-1951), a native of Bienville Parish in northwestern Louisiana, and the former Bessie Lee Roberts (1887-1961). He had a brother, Jack Roberts Tooke (1918-1972), and a sister, Sarah Katherine Tooke Pankey (1914-2012), who was an educator, primarily in Winnsboro in Franklin Parish, Louisiana.

Tooke was a lieutenant commander in the United States Navy Reserve during World War II. He worked in the military government and civil affairs of the Navy in the Pacific Theater of Operations. Tooke and his first wife, Lucia, had six children. Following the death of his first wife, Tooke married Thais Grimes.

Tooke is interred at Forest Park Cemetery in Shreveport, alongside his first wife, Lucia.

Political offices
Preceded by Lloyd Hendrick; Riemer Calhoun	Louisiana State Senator for DeSoto and Caddo parishes Charles Emery Tooke Jr. (alongside Riemer Calhoun in first term and B. H. "Johnny" Rogers in second term); 1948 – 1956	Succeeded by B. H. "Johnny" Rogers; Jackson B. Davis
