= Earle Labor =

American writer (1928–2022)

Earle Gene Labor (March 3, 1928 – September 15, 2022) was an American writer. A George Wilson Professor (Emeritus) of American Literature at Centenary College of Louisiana, his research and teaching career was devoted to the study of the American author, Jack London. He taught the first undergraduate course devoted to London at Utah State University in 1966. Labor taught the first-ever graduate course on London in 1973-74 (University of Aarhus, Denmark) while on a Fulbright Scholarship.

Labor received his B.A. and M.A. from Southern Methodist University in 1949 and 1952, respectively. He received his PhD from the University of Wisconsin in 1961. He was the founder and curator of The Jack London Museum and Research Center at Centenary College. Classes he has taught include: a seminar on Jack London; a class on American gothic fiction 'The Power of Darkness'; a seminar on the American novel; a two-semester survey course on American literature; and several classes on Critical Approaches to Literature. Jack London: An American Life received the 2014 Western Writers of America Spur Award for Best Nonfiction Biography.

In 1991, Labor received the "Humanist of the Year Award" from the Louisiana Endowment for the Humanities.

In 2016, the DeGolyer Library at Southern Methodist University published Labor's memoir, The Far Music.

Labor died in Shreveport, Louisiana, on September 15, 2022, at the age of 94.

== Bibliography ==
GREAT SHORT WORKS OF JACK LONDON, Harper Perennial Classics Series, Editor (Harper & Row, 1965; rev. ed., 1970).

A HANDBOOK OF CRITICAL APPROACHES TO LITERATURE, Co-Author with Wilfred L. Guerin, et al. (Harper & Row, 1966; 6th ed. Oxford UP, 2011).

MANDALA: LITERATURE FOR CRITICAL ANALYSIS, Co-Editor with Guerin, et al. (Harper & Row, 1970).

THE FUTURE OF COLLEGE ENGLISH: A CEA CHAP BOOK, Editor (The College English Association, 1972).

TUSAS JACK LONDON (Twayne, 1974; rev. ed. with Jeanne Campbell Reesman, 1994).

JACK LONDON: A KLONDIKE TRILOGY, Editor (Neville, 1983).

LIT: LITERATURE AND INTERPRETIVE TECHNIQUES, Co-Editor with Guerin, et al. (Harper & Row, 1986).

THE LETTERS OF JACK LONDON, 3 Vols., Co-Editor with Robert C. Leitz and I. Milo Shepard (Stanford UP, 1988).

THE CALL OF THE WILD, WHITE FANG, AND OTHER STORIES BY JACK LONDON, Co-Editor with Leitz, World's Classics Series (Oxford UP, 1990).

THE STORIES OF JACK LONDON: AUTHORIZED ONE-VOLUME EDITION, Co-Editor with Robert Leitz and I. Milo Shepard (Macmillan, 1991).

THE COMPLETE STORIES OF JACK LONDON, 3 Vols., Co-Editor with Robert Leitz and I. Milo Shepard (Stanford UP, 1993).

THE PORTABLE JACK LONDON, Editor (Viking/Penguin, 1994).

TO BUILD A FIRE AND OTHER STORIES, Afterword, World's Best Reading Series (Reader's Digest Association, 1994).

IN THE STEPS OF JACK LONDON by Vil Bykov, Co-Editor with Susan Nuernberg and Hensley C. Woodbridge (www.jacklondons.net, 2005).

JACK LONDON: THE SEA-WOLF AND SELECTED STORIES, Introduction, Signet Classics (New American Library, Penguin, 2013).

JACK LONDON: AN AMERICAN LIFE (Farrar, Straus & Giroux, 2013). Received Western Writers of America Golden Spur Award as Best Western Non-Fiction Biography.

THE FAR MUSIC: A MEMOIR (DeGolyer Library, SMU, 2016). Celebrates the unique but neglected “Era of Bright Expectations” in America between the end of WWII and beginning of the Korean War (1945-1950).

JACK LONDON: THE CALL OF THE WILD, WHITE FANG, AND SELECTED STORIES, Introduction, Penguin Classics Series (Penguin/Random House, November, 2019).
