= Jackson B. Davis =

American politician (1918–2016)

Louisiana State Senator for Caddo and Bossier parishes (later District 37)
- In office 1956–1980
- Preceded by: Charles Emery Tooke Jr. B. H. "Johnny" Rogers
- Succeeded by: Sydney B. Nelson

Personal details
- Born: Jackson Beauregard Davis; March 27, 1918 Rapides Parish, Louisiana, U.S.
- Died: August 22, 2016 (aged 98) Shreveport, Louisiana, U.S.
- Party: Democratic Party
- Spouse: Rosemary Slattery Davis (m. 1944)
- Children: 4
- Parent(s): Jesse Octo; Litha Pittman Davis
- Education: Louisiana College; Northwestern State University; Louisiana State University
- Occupation: Lawyer
- (1) A Democrat, Davis repudiated U.S. President Lyndon B. Johnson in the 1964 general election and instead supported Republican Barry Goldwater. (2) Davis spent his entire United States Navy service (1941–1946) at Pearl Harbor, Hawaii.

Jackson Beauregard Davis Sr. (March 27, 1918 – August 22, 2016) was an American lawyer and politician based in Shreveport, Louisiana, who served as a Democrat in the Louisiana State Senate from 1956 to 1980.

Political offices
Preceded by Charles Emery Tooke, Jr. B. H. "Johnny" Rogers	Louisiana State Senator from Caddo and Bossier parishes (later District 37); Jackson Beauregard Davis, Sr. (alongside B. H. "Johnny" Rogers in first three terms and Joe LeSage in fourth term); 1956–1980	Succeeded by Sydney B. Nelson
