= Thomas Albert Smith Adams =

American clergyman and poet (1839–1888)

Thomas Albert Smith Adams (February 5, 1839 – December 21, 1888), also known as "TAS", was a southern American Methodist clergyman and poet.

== Background ==
The great-grandparents of T. A. S. Adams, as he was generally called, were Welsh-Irish Presbyterians, who emigrated from Ireland to South Carolina in 1766. Abram Adams, his father, moved with his wife and five children, in 1834, to Noxubee County, Mississippi, and bought a tract of land from the Native Americans in the area. Ten out of the fourteen children in this thrifty, intelligent, religious family lived to the age of twenty-one. Among them was T. A, S. Adams, born February 5, 1839, and named for a general under whom his father served in the War of 1812. From the neighborhood school he entered, with marked literary aptitude, the University of Mississippi and completed the Junior year, graduating with honors at Emory and Henry College, Virginia, in 1860. The same year he married, and entered the Methodist ministry. He was chaplain of the 11th Mississippi Infantry Regiment under General Joseph R. Davis in the Confederate Army. Transferring in 1871 from the Mobile Conference, which he had joined, to the North Mississippi Conference, formed that year, he soon ranked among the leaders in the Conference, filling important stations and at intervals appointed to the presidency of several church schools. He was among the first, and earnest, advocates of a Mississippi Methodist College. His epic poem, Enscotidion; or, Shadow of Death, was published in 1876. Aunt Peggy and Other Poems appeared in 1882, in which year he was a delegate from his Conference to the General Conference of the Southern Methodist Church. The degree of Doctor of Divinity was conferred on him by his alma mater in 1884. In 1886, he became president of Centenary College of Louisiana (Jackson), but resigned the next year and moved to Jackson, Mississippi, where he established a school with the design of having it become the "State Methodist College". But his plans miscarried, and he reentered the itinerant ministry in the North Mississippi Conference. He died suddenly, from a stroke of apoplexy, December 21, 1888, in the railway station at Jackson, Mississippi, while preparing to leave for his new appointment at Oxford, Mississippi.
