= Jim Leslie (journalist) =

American journalist

James S. "Jim" Leslie
- The Shreveport Times photo of Leslie in the Louisiana State University in Shreveport Archive
- Born: October 27, 1937
- Died: July 9, 1976 (aged 38); Baton Rouge, Louisiana, U.S.
- Cause of death: Unsolved homicide
- Resting place: Forest Park East Cemetery in Shreveport, Louisiana, U.S.
- Occupations: Journalist for The Shreveport Times; Public relations advertising executive
- Spouse: Carolyn S. Leslie
- Children: Scott and Mickey Leslie

James S. Leslie (October 27, 1937 – July 9, 1976), known as Jim Leslie, was a journalist for The Shreveport Times who became a public relations and advertising executive in Shreveport, Louisiana, United States. He is known for having been murdered in Baton Rouge on July 9, 1976, in a case described by the police as a "professional hit." George W. D'Artois, the Public Safety Commissioner in Shreveport, was twice arrested in the case; the first time he was released for lack of evidence. He was arrested again on charges of first-degree murder in April 1977, suspected of contracting for the murder of Leslie, but died in June of that year during heart surgery. No one was tried in the case.

Leslie had been hired by D'Artois in 1974 to manage communications in his re-election campaign; he had been in office since 1962. In the mid-1970s, D'Artois was the subject of an extended investigation by the Times. Leslie had told a friend earlier in 1976 that D'Artois had tried to pay him with city funds for his work on his 1974 campaign, and warned him against testifying before a grand jury. With a full-scale investigation of the commissioner underway, Leslie was called to testify to a grand jury about alleged corruption in D'Artois's department.

== Biography ==
James S. Leslie, known as "Jim", was born in Springfield, Missouri in 1937. He attended public schools before going to college. After graduation, he became involved in journalism and worked for The Shreveport Times for several years as a reporter. He developed a wide network among colleagues, and with people in city and state government. Leslie later went into public relations and ultimately became an advertising executive. He also became involved in political communications and conceived of a number of campaigns.

He married Carolyn S. and they had two sons, Scott and Mickey.

== 1974 campaign ==
In 1974 George D'Artois, the Public Service Commissioner in Shreveport since 1962, hired Leslie to manage his communications as part of his campaign for re-election. D'Artois, a Democrat, faced a serious challenge from a Republican competitor in 1970, and was aware that Republicans were growing in strength throughout the city and state as white conservatives started to switch from the Democratic Party. D'Artois won re-election.

A team of reporters from the Times began working on a series of investigative pieces about D'Artois in the mid-1970s. One line led to Leslie, who still held two uncancelled checks from the 1974 campaign. Leslie told reporters that D'Artois had tried to pay him with city funds for his services rather than from the campaign account, which was the only legal source. He told friend and former colleague, Elliot Stonecipher, that D'Artois had told him to cash the checks, and warned him against testifying in an upcoming grand jury in Caddo Parish.

== 1976 activities ==
In the summer of 1976, Leslie was involved in the advertising campaign in support of a controversial right-to-work bill under consideration in the Louisiana State Legislature, which was strongly opposed by labor unions. Much of the lobbying in favor of the bill had been directed by Edward J. Steimel of the relatively new organization, Louisiana Association of Business and Industry, which opposed strong unions in the state. The Taft-Hartley Act permits states to prohibit closed shops that require employees of companies to join or pay dues to a labor union.

Leslie had been staying at the Prince Murat Inn in Baton Rouge as the bill was considered in the state senate. After celebrating the victory with colleagues near the Louisiana State Capitol, Leslie returned to the Prince Murat Inn. After he parked his car but before he could reach the hotel, Leslie was shot and killed instantly in the parking lot by an unknown assailant. It was found a panel in the boundary fence had been removed, and the shooter used the space to hit Leslie. Given the lack of evidence, Baton Rouge detectives described it as a "professional hit."

Sheriff Harold Terry of Caddo Parish, who had taken office nine days before, informed the Leslie family in Shreveport about the executive's killing. Josiah Lee "J. L." Wilson III, then a reporter for the Times, reported that deputies told him that Terry's eyes were red from weeping as he left his office to meet with the Leslie family.

There was speculation that D'Artois had hired a man to murder Leslie in relation to the upcoming grand jury. D'Artois was arrested in August 1976 on charges related to Leslie's murder and forced to resign his office. He was released at the time for lack of evidence, but was scheduled to be tried in a separate case for theft of city funds in the amount of $30,000 for payment of police informants.

After his trial was repeatedly postponed due to poor health, D'Artois was arrested again on April 19, 1977, on charges of first-degree murder. D'Artois initially barricaded himself in the attic of his house and refused to accept the arrest warrant. Insisting that he would only go to the jail in East Baton Rouge Parish and not Caddo Parish, D'Artois had appealed to the Louisiana Supreme Court against his arrest, citing his health. The Louisiana Supreme Court refused to block a trial of D'Artois on the theft charges. While there had been media speculation that Leslie had been murdered in relation to the right-to-work bill, the East Baton Rouge Parish police said there was no evidence to support that.

The same day, police from Concordia Parish arrested Donald Gardner of Shreveport in the murders of both Leslie and Russell Griffith Jr., a Concordia Parish resident. Griffith had been suspected as the gunman in Leslie's murder. Gardner was first arrested in the fall of 1976 and was described as the key figure between D'Artois and Leslie's murderer(s). Also arrested in connection with Griffith's murder in 1977 was Kenneth C. Brouillette of Lettsworth, who was being held at the Concordia Parish Jail. The East Baton Rouge Parish Sheriff's office said that Gardner and Griffith were accused of killing Leslie for $30,000, paid by D'Artois, in retaliation for Leslie's testimony before a Caddo Parish grand jury.

D'Artois died in June 1977 during open heart surgery in San Antonio, Texas. He never faced trial for his role in the case. The killing of Leslie was never fully solved, and no one was convicted of either Leslie's or Griffith's murders.

== Recent studies ==
In 2009, Bill Keith published a book related to the case: The Commissioner: A True Story of Deceit, Dishonor, and Death, a study of the D'Artois administration, the commissioner's connection to Louisiana crime bosses, and the unsolved Leslie murder. Keith had served as a state senator from Shreveport at the time of Leslie's homicide, and also served as a journalist with both The Shreveport Times and the since defunct Shreveport Journal.

In 2013, Jere Joiner, a retired police detective from Shreveport, published Badge of Dishonor, an exploration of the corruption of the D'Artois administration, and the commissioner's ties to the alleged murders of Leslie and Griffiths. Elliott Stonecipher, a political consultant, analyst, and friend of Leslie, was reported as saying that he "never once doubted that D'Artois was behind the assassination." Stonecipher said that Leslie had told him that he believed D'Artois would try to have him killed. Others had suggested in 1976 and 1977 that passage of the controversial right-to-work bill may have been the catalyst for Leslie's homicide, but the East Baton Rouge Parish police said there was no evidence for that. They said they found many strands between D'Artois and Leslie's killers.

Leslie is interred at Forest Park East Cemetery in Shreveport. After D'Artois died, he was also interred there. Each was a lifelong resident of the city.

== See also ==
- List of unsolved murders (1900–1979)

== Memorial ==
The American Advertising Federation of Shreveport-Bossier set up the annual Jim Leslie Memorial Scholarship to honor the late public relations executive. They annually award $2,500 to a student studying advertising, Marketing, or a related field at any 4-year institution in North Louisiana.
