= B. H. Rogers =

American politician (1905–1977)

Louisiana State Senator for DeSoto and Caddo parishes
- In office 1952–1968
- Preceded by: Riemer Calhoun; Charles Emery Tooke Jr.
- Succeeded by: Bryan A. Poston

Louisiana State Representative for DeSoto Parish
- In office 1950–1952
- Preceded by: R. Shirley Williams
- Succeeded by: Sam C. Murray

Personal details
- Born: Bernard Harry Rogers; October 5, 1905 Grand Cane, Louisiana, U.S.
- Died: April 23, 1977 (aged 71)
- Resting place: Grand Cane Cemetery
- Party: Democratic Party
- Spouse: Josephine Augusta Mann Rogers
- Children: 2
- Education: Louisiana State University

Military service
- Branch/service: United States Army
- Rank: Lieutenant colonel
- Battles/wars: World War II

Bernard Harry "Johnny" Rogers (October 5, 1905 – April 23, 1977) was a Louisiana politician who served in the Louisiana House of Representatives and the Louisiana State Senate.

Political offices
Preceded by R. Shirley Williams	Louisiana State Representative for DeSoto Parish; Bernard H. "Johnny" Rogers; 1950–1952	Succeeded by Sam C. Murray
Preceded by Riemer Calhoun; Charles Emery Tooke Jr.	Louisiana State Senator for DeSoto and Caddo parishes Bernard H. "Johnny" Rogers (alongside Charles Emery Tooke Jr., in first term and Jackson B. Davis of Shreveport in the three later terms); 1952–1968	Succeeded by Bryan A. Poston
