= Nathan Allen =

American physician (1813–1889)

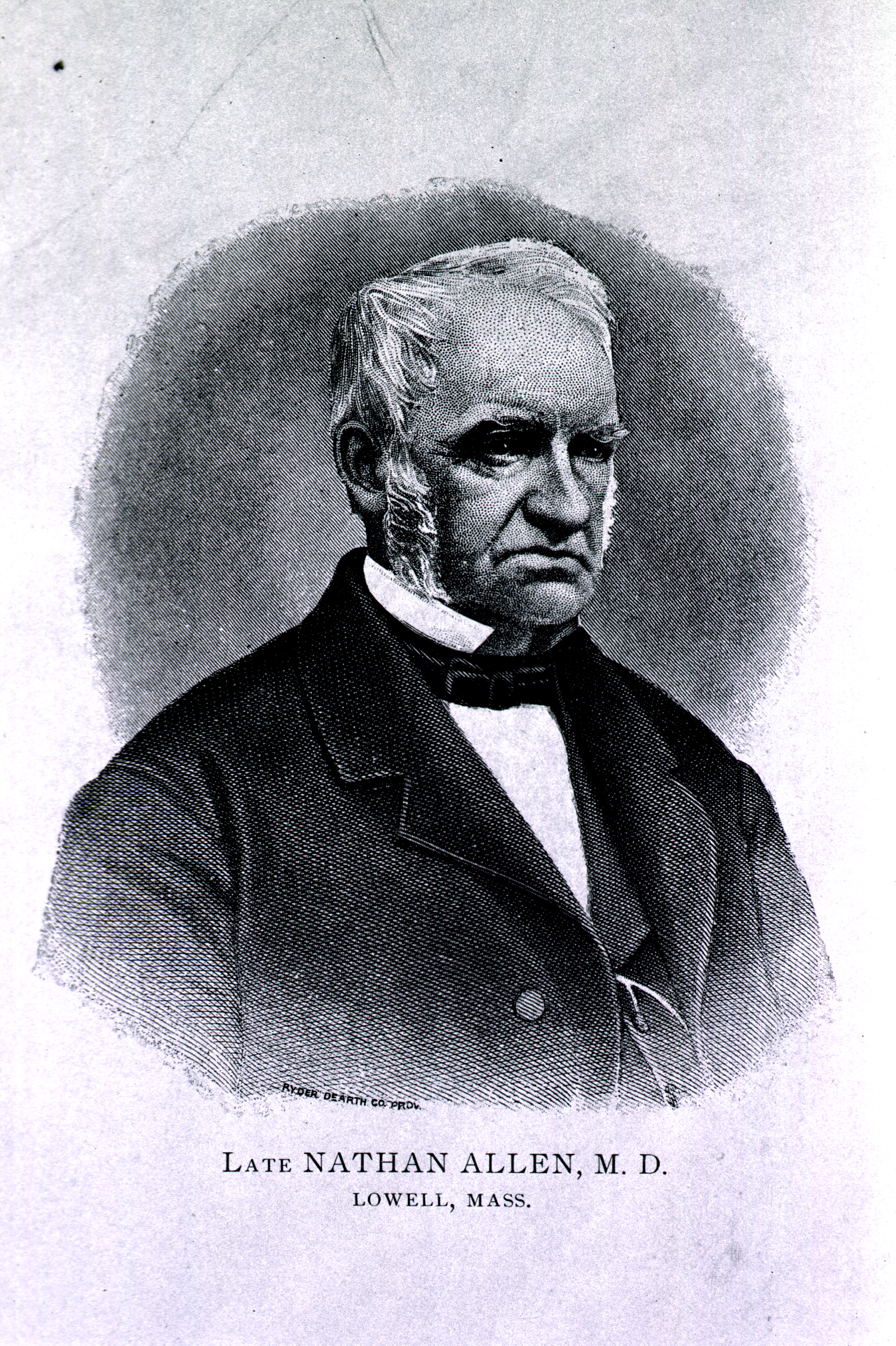
- Born: April 25, 1813; Princeton
- Died: January 1, 1889; Lowell
- Education: Amherst College, Pennsylvania Medical College
- Occupations: Medical doctor, social reformer
- Relatives: Jonathan Moses Allen
- Awards: Legum Doctor (Amherst College, 1873); Doctor of Medicine (Castleton Medical College, 1847)

Nathan Allen (April 25, 1813 – January 1, 1889) was a medical doctor, social reformer, and public health advocate.

Nathan Allen was born in Princeton, Massachusetts. His parents, Moses and Mehitable Oliver Allen, were both born in Barre, Massachusetts, the great ancestor of this family of Allens having been Walter Allen, one of the original proprietors of Old Newbury, Massachusetts, in 1648.

Nathan Allen graduated from Amherst College in 1836, received his M. D. from the Pennsylvania Medical College in 1841, and settled in Lowell the same year. Here he practiced medicine until his death, January 1, 1889, the result of a fall down stairs.

He received the honorary M. D. from Castleton (Vermont) Medical College in 1847, and LL. D. from Amherst in 1873.

Allen devoted himself to the study of physical culture, degeneracy, insanity, heredity, hygiene, education, and intemperance. In 1856 he was chosen a trustee of Amherst College, and in 1864 Governor John A. Andrew appointed him a member of the State Board of Charities. He served on the board for fifteen years. In 1872 he visited Europe as a delegate appointed by Governor Washburn to the international congress of prison reform in London.

His published writings comprise over one thousand octavo pages. Some of the more noted are: "Physical Culture in Amherst College," "Intermarriage of Relatives," "Physiological Laws of Human Increase," "Normal Standard of Women for Propagation," "Report on Lunacy to the Massachusetts Legislature," and his best known work, "Change in the New England Population."

He married first, September 24, 1841, Sarah H. Spaulding, of Wakefield, Massachusetts. She died without children and he married a second time, May 20, 1857, Annie A. Waters, of Salem, Massachusetts, by whom he had four children.

He was for a long time connected with St. John's Hospital in Lowell.

Nathan Allen died on 1 January 1889 (75 Years) in Lowell.
