= Delta State University =

Public university in Cleveland, Mississippi, US

- Former names: Delta State Teachers College (1924–1955); Delta State College (1955–1974)
- Type: Public university
- Established: February 19, 1924; 102 years ago
- Parent institution: Mississippi Institutions of Higher Learning
- Accreditation: SACS
- Academic affiliations: Space-grant
- Endowment: $39.8 million (2021)
- President: Dr. Daniel J. Ennis
- Faculty: 122
- Students: 2,863 (Fall 2026)
- Location: Cleveland, Mississippi, United States; 33°44′31″N 90°43′36″W
- Campus: 332 acres (1.34 km^{2}); Remote town
- Colors: Green and white
- Nickname: Statesmen & Lady Statesmen
- Sporting affiliations: NCAA Division II – Gulf South
- Mascots: The Statesman; The Okra (unofficial)
- Website: deltastate.edu

Delta State University (DSU) is a public university in Cleveland, Mississippi, United States, in the Mississippi Delta.

== History ==
=== Establishment and early development ===
Delta State University was established as Delta State Teachers College by the Mississippi Legislature in 1924. Governor Henry L. Whitfield signed the legislation on April 9 following sponsorship by senators William B. Roberts and Arthur Marshall. Cleveland and Bolivar County provided the former Bolivar County Agricultural High School property for the campus. The college opened on September 15, 1925, and held its first commencement in June 1928, awarding Bachelor of Science degrees to 13 graduates.

The institution’s original purpose was to prepare teachers for Mississippi’s public schools. Its first president, James Wesley Broom, died in May 1926 during the college’s first academic year. William Marion Kethley succeeded him and served until 1956, overseeing the institution through the Great Depression, World War II and the postwar expansion of higher education.

Delta State received initial accreditation from the Southern Association of Colleges and Schools in 1930. Its academic offerings subsequently expanded beyond teacher preparation, and the institution became Delta State College in 1955.

=== Postwar expansion and desegregation ===
Following World War II, returning veterans increased demand for college education and housing. Delta State adapted surplus military buildings for classrooms, dormitories and apartments for married students. Enrollment rose from 185 in fall 1945 to 483 the following year and 596 in fall 1947.

On May 8, 1947, Under Secretary of State Dean Acheson addressed the Delta Council in Cleveland on European reconstruction. His speech outlined the need for American assistance to postwar Europe and preceded Secretary of State George C. Marshall’s June 5 address at Harvard University proposing the recovery initiative that became known as the Marshall Plan.

James Milton Ewing became president in 1956. During his administration, the college added residence halls, academic buildings, a library, a cafeteria and a coliseum. Graduate instruction began in summer 1965, initially leading to the Master of Education degree.

Delta State initially admitted only white students. Shirley Antoinette Washington became its first Black student in fall 1967. Black students subsequently organized to challenge discrimination and seek greater representation in university affairs. In February 1969, the Black Student Organization presented demands that included hiring Black faculty and counselors, fair grading, Black history instruction, scholarships and representation in student government. On March 10, students held a sit-in outside Ewing’s office in Kethley Hall. Police arrested the demonstrators and transported them to Mississippi State Penitentiary at Parchman, where they were held overnight. Members of Cleveland’s Black community helped secure their release through property bonds.

Negotiations between student representatives and the administration followed. A seven-member Black Student Organization committee met with Ewing and faculty members to discuss the demands. The administration agreed to hire a Black counselor, offer a Black history course and assign Black students to residence hall rooms on a first-come, first-served basis. In fall 1969, the college employed two part-time Black instructors who also provided counseling. One taught a Black history course.

By fall 2025, Black students constituted the university’s largest racial group. Mississippi Institutions of Higher Learning reported 1,258 Black students, 1,213 white students and 320 students in a category labeled “other,” representing approximately 45.1 percent, 43.5 percent and 11.5 percent of total enrollment, respectively.

=== University status and academic expansion ===
Aubrey K. Lucas succeeded Ewing in 1971. On March 15, 1974, the institution became Delta State University, reflecting the expansion of its academic mission and graduate offerings. Kent Wyatt, a Delta State alumnus, served as president from 1975 to 1999. During his administration, the university added professional and graduate programs. The School of Nursing began instruction in 1978, the commercial aviation program was established in January 1981 and the university awarded its first doctoral degree in 1984.

The Bologna Performing Arts Center opened in September 1995. Funded through state support and private contributions, the center added performance spaces for university ensembles, touring productions and regional arts education programs. Its programming includes concerts, theatrical productions, school performances and summer arts instruction.

=== Developments in the 21st century ===
==== Delta Music Institute ====
The Delta Music Institute originated with a 2003 gift from businessman Fred Carl, founder of Viking Range Corporation. developed an academic program combining the technical, creative and business aspects of the music and entertainment industries. The institute offers a Bachelor of Science in Entertainment Industry Studies, with instruction in areas including audio production and entertainment business.

The institute’s recording studios opened in spring 2009 inside the former Whitfield Gymnasium. The converted building accommodates recording, mixing and instructional facilities. Studio A was designed for large ensembles, including orchestras, concert bands and choirs, while other studio facilities support smaller recording projects and audio postproduction. The studios serve as teaching facilities for students in the entertainment industry program.

==== GRAMMY Museum Mississippi ====
GRAMMY Museum Mississippi opened on the Delta State campus on March 5, 2016, following collaboration between the university and the Cleveland community. Developed by the nonprofit Cleveland Music Foundation, it was the first GRAMMY Museum built outside Los Angeles.

The 28,000-square-foot museum examines Mississippi’s influence on American music alongside the history of recording and the GRAMMY Awards. Its exhibits cover musical styles including blues, gospel, country, rock, pop and jazz. Interactive displays explore recording technology, songwriting, performance and the development of recorded sound.

The museum also provides school tours, teacher resources, student workshops and public programs. Its educational activities connect music with history, technology and other classroom subjects. The museum’s location places these programs alongside the university’s music and entertainment industry instruction.

==== Academic restructuring and enrollment ====
In 2024, amid financial difficulties and declining enrollment, the Mississippi Institutions of Higher Learning Board of Trustees approved a restructuring plan that eliminated 21 of Delta State’s 61 academic programs and closed the College of Arts and Sciences. The restructuring included staffing reductions and plans for new interdisciplinary degrees. Students already enrolled in discontinued programs were provided pathways to complete their degrees.

Enrollment increased to 2,791 in fall 2025, a 5.2 percent increase over the previous year following several years of decline. The university also marked the centennial of its opening in 1925.

=== Death of Trey Reed ===
On 15 September 2025, the body of 21-year-old Demartravion "Trey" Reed, a student at the university, was found hanging from a tree on campus. Reed's death was initially reported on social media to be a lynching, but autopsy reports from the Bolivar County coroner and the Mississippi medical examiner's office found no evidence of foul play and ruled it a suicide. Reed's family disputed the reports and arranged for an independent autopsy with celebrity attorney Ben Crump. The details of the autopsy still have not been publicized as of October 2026, and Crump has stopped communicating with the family.

=== Presidents ===
- James Wesley Broom – 1925–1926
- William Marion Kethley – 1926–1956
- James Milton Ewing – 1956–1971
- Aubrey K. Lucas – 1971–1975
- Kent Wyatt – 1975–1999
- David Potter – 1999–2002
- John Thornell – 2002–2003 (interim)
- John Hilpert – 2003–2013
- William N. LaForge – 2013–2022
- E. E. Caston – 2022–2023 (interim)
- Daniel J. Ennis – 2023–present

== Campus ==
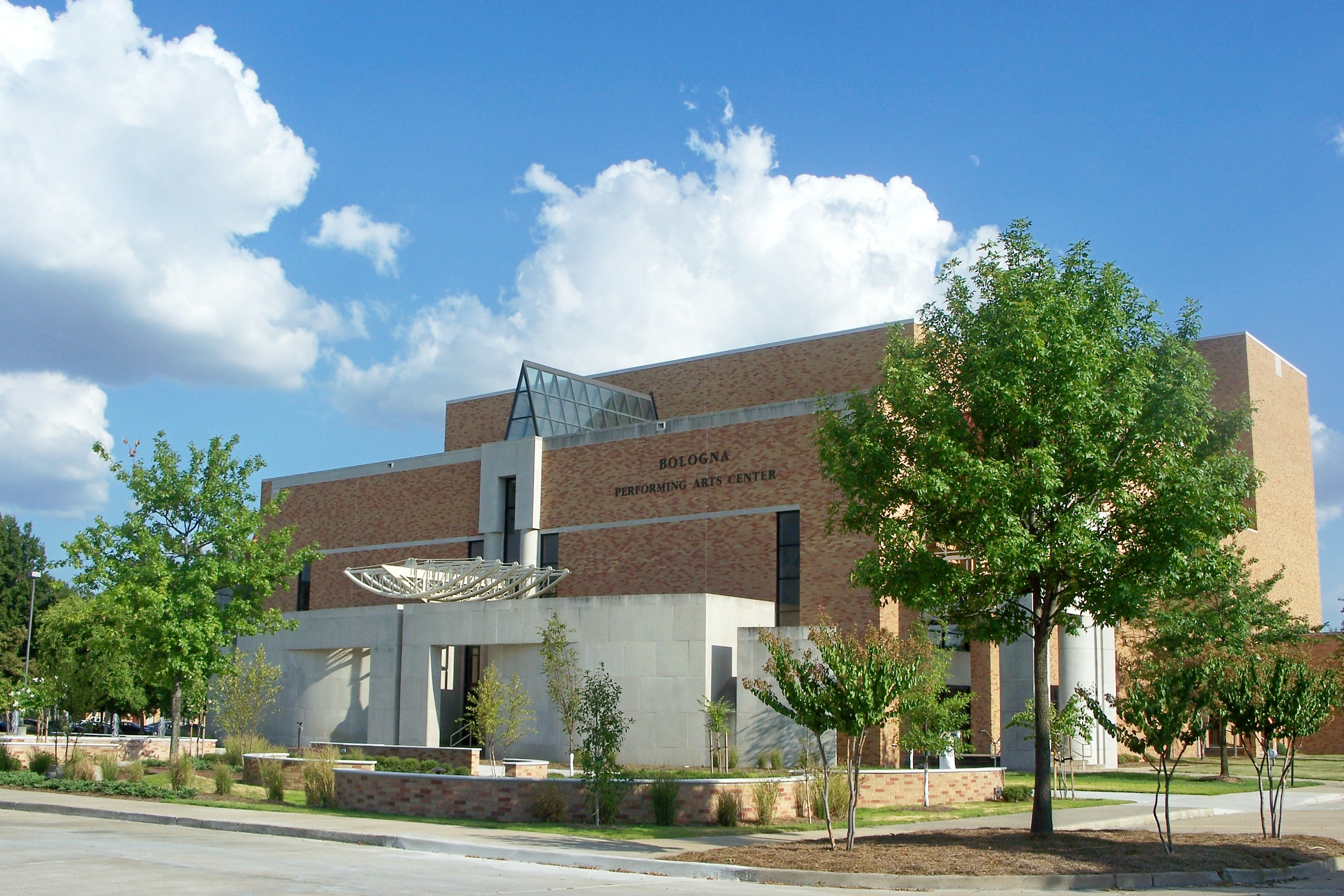
Bologna Performing Arts Center

Delta State University is located on 332 acres (1.34 km^{2}) at 1003 W Sunflower Rd (Highway 8 West), in the northwest area of Cleveland, MS, 38733.

About 30 percent of students reside in on-campus housing. Delta State provides both men's dormitories and women's dormitories, as well as apartments for married students.

== Mascots ==
Delta State has two mascots, the Statesman (official) and the Fighting Okra (unofficial). Since its inception, Delta State's sports teams have officially been known as the Statesmen because of the role State Rep. Walter Sillers Jr. played in the location of the school in Cleveland. Sillers was Speaker of the Mississippi House of Representatives for 20 years. The teams with female athletes are called the Lady Statesmen.

However, since the late 1980s, the student body embraced the Fighting Okra, a mascot that depicts a piece of okra wearing boxing gloves and brandishing a fierce expression. In 2006, the mascot was a character in the 2006 episode of Good Eats titled "Okraphobia". The Fighting Okra was featured on an ESPN commercial during the 2023 College National Championship Game.

== Academics ==
The university offers more than 20 undergraduate programs, 15 master's programs, and 2 doctoral programs. They are organized into four colleges:

- College of Education, Arts and Humanities
- College of Business
- College of Aviation
- College of Nursing, Health and Sciences

== Athletics ==
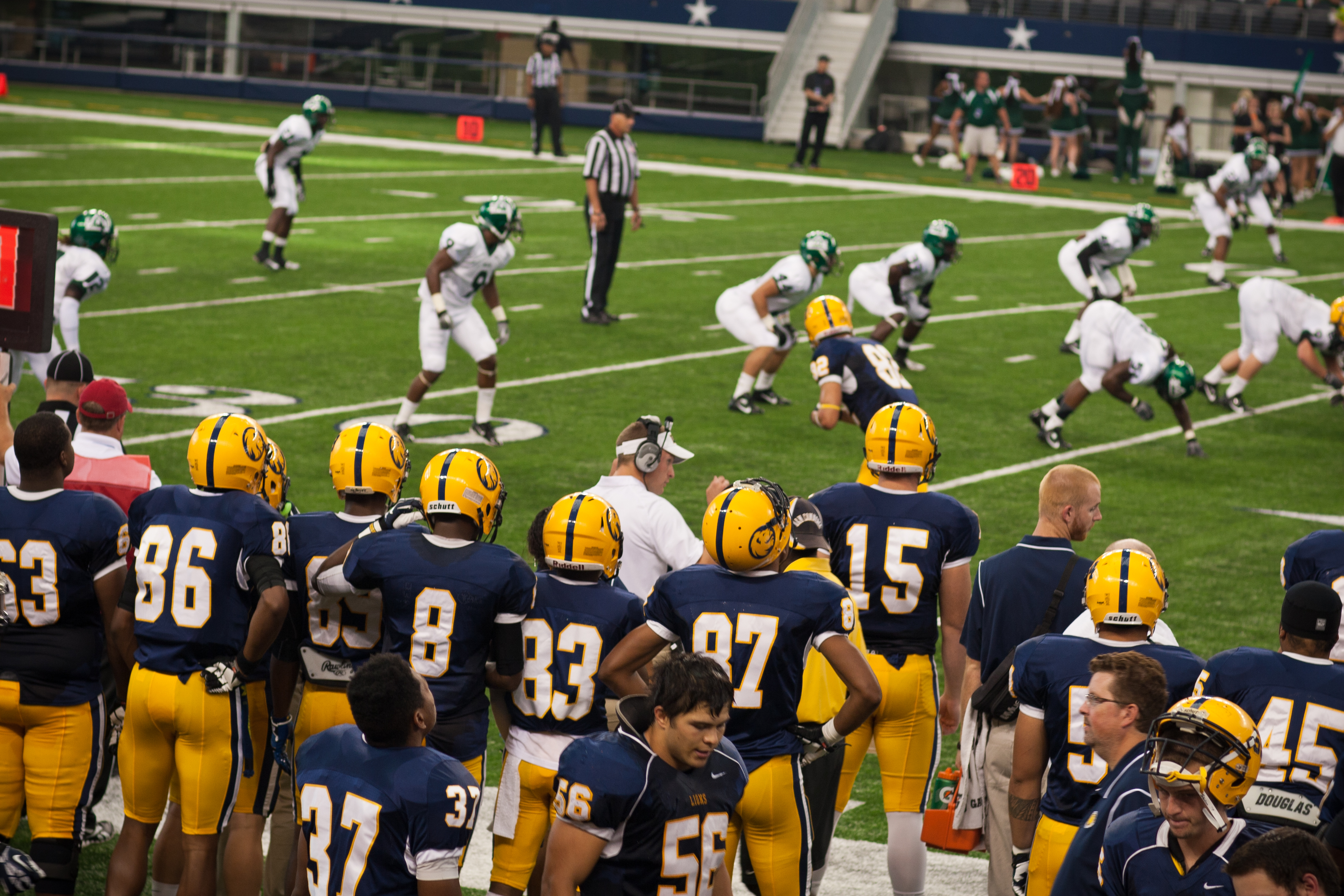
The Delta State football team in action against the Texas A&M–Commerce Lions in 2013

The Delta State University Department of Athletics sponsors thirteen intercollegiate sports (as well as cheerleading, which is not considered a sport by the NCAA), competing at the NCAA Division II level. DSU is affiliated with the Gulf South Conference and New South Intercollegiate Swim Conference. The institution competes intercollegiately in men's American football, basketball, baseball, swimming, diving, tennis, soccer, and golf. The women's intercollegiate program consists of basketball, tennis, fast-pitch softball, cross-country, swimming, soccer, cheerleading, and diving.

One of Delta State's most notable sports coaches was (Lily) Margaret Wade (1912–1995). Wade played on the basketball team for Delta State, but the school dropped the sport when she was 19. The school claimed the sport was "too strenuous for young ladies". Wade responded, "We cried and burned our uniforms but there was nothing else we could do." Basketball was revived in 1973, and Wade was asked to coach the team. She coached the women's basketball team to three consecutive AIAW national championships and a 93–4 record, including a 51-game winning streak, at the time, the longest winning streak in women's college basketball. One star of these championship teams was Luisa (Lucy) Harris, who was drafted by the New Orleans Jazz in 1977. Wade was elected to the Basketball Hall of Fame in 1985. Today, the Division I women's basketball player of the year receives the Margaret Wade Trophy.

Boo Ferriss coached the baseball program for nearly thirty years and led them to three appearances in the NCAA Division II College World Series before retiring in 1988. Boo was born in Shaw, Mississippi. San Francisco Giants catcher Eli Whiteside played baseball for the university, as did Los Angeles Dodgers pitcher Brent Leach. Matt Miller of the Cleveland Indians also played for the Statesmen.

Delta State alumnus Jeremy Richardson was an NBA player.

== Flight school ==
=== Commercial aviation ===
Delta State established its commercial aviation program in January 1981. Originally housed within the College of Business, the program gained greater institutional recognition when the college became the College of Business and Aviation in 2017. In June 2026, the Mississippi Institutions of Higher Learning Board of Trustees approved its separation into two colleges, with a standalone College of Aviation established that fall.

Delta State offers the only undergraduate and graduate aviation degree programs in Mississippi’s public university system. Its Bachelor of Commercial Aviation programs in Flight Operations and Aviation Management hold accreditation from the Aviation Accreditation Board International, initially awarded in 2015 and renewed in 2025. Eligible flight operations graduates may qualify for the Federal Aviation Administration’s reduced-hour restricted airline transport pilot certification pathway.

The university also provides agricultural pilot training through its Agricultural Aviation Operations Career Pathway. Developed with Mississippi Delta Community College, the South Delta Planning and Development District, workforce agencies and agricultural aviation businesses, the pathway combines flight training, aerial application instruction and industry experience. Its first class graduated in 2023. In August 2026, Delta State dedicated an agricultural aviation simulator to support pilot qualification, refresher training and the practice of aerial application procedures.

Industry relationships include Delta Air Lines’ Propel Pilot Career Path Program, which offers selected participants a route through flight instruction and Endeavor Air toward employment with Delta, subject to meeting program requirements. FedEx supports aviation students through its Purple Runway Aviation Scholarship program. In 2026, Boeing provided funding for four annual aviation scholarships supporting students with financial need and military connections.

Flight training operates from two hangars at Cleveland Municipal Airport, while the Gibson-Gunn Commercial Aviation Building on the university’s main campus houses academic instruction.

=== Aircraft Fleet ===
As of June 2024 the DSU fleet of 28 aircraft consists of the following:

- 5 Cessna 152
- 4 Cessna 172P
- 5 Cessna 172R
- 1 Cessna U206G
- 3 Diamond DA42 L360
- 5 Cirrus SR20
- 5 Tecnam P2010
- 5 Flight Training Devices, including the first-of-it's-kind AT-802 FTD

== Student life ==
=== Residence halls and student housing ===
Delta State provides on-campus housing in Brumby-Castle, Lawler-Harkins, Blansett, Cain-Tatum, Fugler-Hammett and Foundation halls. Brumby-Castle and Lawler-Harkins house women, while Blansett and the Cain-Tatum/Fugler-Hammett complex house men. Foundation Hall accommodates men and women on separate floors.

Most residence halls offer suite-style accommodations with shared bathrooms. Foundation Hall, which opened in August 2010, provides bathrooms within individual rooms and was designed to accommodate 362 students. Residence hall facilities include furnished rooms, wireless internet, laundry facilities and common areas, with study rooms and shared kitchens available in selected buildings.

The university’s housing developed alongside its enrollment. Following World War II, surplus military buildings were converted into dormitories and apartments for returning veterans and married students. Later additions included Lawler-Harkins Hall and the Hill Apartments in 1969. The Hill Apartments extended the university’s housing options beyond conventional residence halls, providing apartment accommodations for students with families.

=== Greek life ===
Delta State has numerous social fraternities and sororities.

== Notable graduates ==
- Steve Azar, country musician
- Pete Golding, college football coach
- Jack Gregory, professional football player
- Lusia Harris, professional basketball player, Olympian
- Rowan Nathaniel House, artist
- Jeanette W. Hyde, US ambassador in the Caribbean
- Caroline Jouisse, French swimmer and Olympian
- Anthony Maddox, professional football player
- Aubrey Matthews, professional football player
- Charlotte P. Morris, president of Tuskegee University
- Scott Nagy, college basketball coach
- Viola B. Sanders, naval officer
- Margaret Wade, college basketball coach
- Eli Whiteside, professional baseball player and coach
- David Abney, former CEO/Chaiman of the Board, UPS
