= Rowan Nathaniel House =

American artist

Rowan Nathaniel House (December 13, 1908 – January 26, 1947) was a mid-20th-century artist. He used a variety of media including oil on canvas, watercolor, and pen and ink.

== Early life ==
House was born in Mississippi, U.S.A. to Nathaniel Perkins House (banker, cotton merchant, and farmer) and Rowena Thayer. He spent his childhood in Mineral Wells, just south of Memphis, Tennessee and later attended the Art Institute of Chicago. After the U.S. Wall Street crash of 1929, he returned to Cleveland, Mississippi to graduate from Delta State college (now Delta State University). He was stricken with polio at the age of 19 which affected his left arm and leg, both of which were considerably smaller and weaker throughout his life as a result. He utilized the techniques of Elizabeth Kenny in the treatment of his condition.

== Career ==
During the years following the Great Depression, House supported himself primarily through commercial art in Memphis, Tennessee. In particular, he painted portraits for young southern debutantes celebrating their coming out parties. Many such portraits were reproduced in the Commercial Appeal, the daily newspaper in Memphis.

In 1935, House married Maxine Boggan and later moved to New York City, New York. While there, he earned a living both as a commercial artist and a free-lance artist.

The subject which House captured in his paintings most frequently was life in the "Deep South". Many of his works centered on cotton farming, farm workers, and various scenery relating to the rural lifestyle of early 20th century Mississippi. He was well known for his pen and ink drawings as well as portraits of many notable people of the South.

== Death ==
After the outbreak of World War II, House was hired by the Army Air Force to work on training films for pilots. He was in Orlando, Florida producing pictures of the first jets when he was stricken with stomach cancer. His stomach was removed at Mount Sinai hospital in New York City. He then returned to Mississippi and the family home. He recuperated for a year before he attempted to work again. House died in 1947 at the age of 38 from complications relating to his stomach cancer. He and his wife never had children, most likely secondary to his polio.

== Posthumous accomplishments ==
During the presidency of Jimmy Carter, several of House's works hung in the Oval Office as part of the President's desire to promote southern artists.

Delta State University in Cleveland, Mississippi has several art scholarships in his memory and has many of House's works on display.
