= Louise Yazbeck =

American composer

Louise Margaret Yazbeck (August 13, 1910 – July 10, 1995) was an American composer and teacher.

She was born in Shreveport, Louisiana to a family of Syrian descent. After attending Centenary College and Washington University in St. Louis, she returned to Shreveport where she composed, taught piano, sponsored the B Natural Music Club, and belonged to several professional arts organizations. She was active in the United States Service Organizations during World War II.

Yazbeck's compositions include:

== Piano ==
- Lebanese-Syrian March in D Major
- Lebanese-Syrian March in G Major

== Vocal ==
- "Echoes"
- "Federation Song" (words by Eva Kouri Solomon; music by Louise Yazbeck)
- "Good Old Southern Blues"
- "SFSLAC" (Southern Federation of Syrian Lebanese American Clubs; words by Eva Kouri Solomon; music by Louise Yazbeck)
