= George W. D'Artois =

American politician

George Wendell D'Artois, Sr.

Public safety commissioner in Shreveport, Louisiana, U.S.
- In office November 1962 – August 6, 1976
- Preceded by: J. Earl Downs

Personal details
- Born: December 25, 1925 Shreveport, Louisiana, U.S.
- Died: June 11, 1977 (aged 51) San Antonio, Texas, U.S.
- Cause of death: Complications from heart surgery
- Resting place: Forest Park Cemetery East in Shreveport
- Party: Democratic
- Spouse: Billie Claire Best D'Artois
- Children: George Wendell D'Artois, Jr. Mary Cecile D'Artois Murray Elaine Claire D'Artois; Grandchildren: Laura-Anne Claire D'Artois Kelsey Alexis D'Artois
- Parent(s): William Francis D'Artois, Sr. Mary Holmes D'Artois
- Education: C. E. Byrd High School Centenary College Louisiana State University
- Occupation: Law enforcement officer

Military service
- Branch/service: United States Marine Corps
- Rank: Sergeant
- Battles/wars: Bougainville in Pacific Theater of Operations of World War II

George Wendell D'Artois, Sr. (December 25, 1925 – June 11, 1977) was an American law enforcement officer and politician in Shreveport, Louisiana, who served as the city's Public Safety Commissioner from 1962 to 1976. D'Artois was investigated more than once for misuse of city funds, and was arrested for his alleged involvement in the 1976 shooting death of Jim Leslie, a Shreveport advertising executive who had managed D'Artois' 1974 re-election campaign. He was released for lack of evidence. A trial on charges of theft of city funds and intimidation of witnesses was postponed several times because of D'Artois's poor health. Arrested again in April 1977 for Leslie's murder, D'Artois died the following month during heart surgery and never went to trial. Histories published in the decades since D'Artois' death state that he was involved with organized crime and had contracted for the murders of both Leslie and Leslie's killer to prevent their testimony before a grand jury.

== Background ==
George W. D'Artois was one of two sons of William Francis D'Artois, Sr. and the former Mary Holmes. He graduated from C. E. Byrd High School. D'Artois married the former Billie Claire Best, with whom he had a son, George, Jr., and two daughters, Mary Cecile and Elaine Claire.

During World War II, D'Artois served for three years in the United States Marine Corps in the Pacific Theater of Operations, with action beginning in November 1943 in the Battle of Bougainville. He attained the rank of sergeant. After the war, D'Artois studied Business Administration at Centenary College in Shreveport and Louisiana State University in Baton Rouge.

During D'Artois's tenure as Public Safety Commissioner, Shreveport had a commission form of government. Commissioners were elected at-large and exercised both legislative and executive duties, both on the city council and as a department head. There were relatively few commissioner seats on the council. This kept power in the hands of those who could gain a majority of voters. African-Americans were still mostly disenfranchised and were not yet being elected to local office. The Civil Rights Movement soon raised legal challenges to city commission governments, charging that they prevented minorities from being able to elect candidates of their choice.

== Political career ==
In 1952, D'Artois became a deputy for the Caddo Parish Sheriff's Department under J. Howell Flournoy. He joined the Democratic Party, which still dominated politics in Louisiana during the decades when most African-Americans were disenfranchised under the state's 1898 constitution. The party, being controlled by white conservative Southern Democrats, had raised barriers to voter registration, as did the common Jim Crow discriminatory practices in most jurisdictions.

After nine years as deputy sheriff, D'Artois resigned to run in 1962 for Public Safety Commissioner in Shreveport, a post that was sometimes seen as a step toward higher office: Governor Jimmie Davis had served in that position in Shreveport from 1938 to 1942.

=== Racial matters ===
In September 1963, as racial tensions were peaking in Shreveport, D'Artois was accused of using intimidation to suppress civil rights activities by African-Americans which were aiming to end racial segregation in the city. D'Artois had denied a permit to a group wanting to march a short distance to the Little Union Baptist Church, where a memorial service was to be held honoring four black girls who had been killed that month in the 16th Street Baptist Church bombing in Birmingham, Alabama. D'Artois ordered his riot squad against what observers said was a peaceful demonstration, and personally rode on horseback into the church sanctuary, interrupting the service and violating sacred space. He then dragged away the pastor, Reverend Harry Blake, and beat him severely. Blake was hospitalized for several weeks.

As D'Artois continued to seek office in a changing political climate, when African-Americans could vote freely, he maintained his popularity with whites and cultivated it with blacks. In state elections held on February 6, 1968, Republican State Representative Taylor W. O'Hearn of Shreveport was seeking a second term. Many more African-Americans were voting since passage of the Voting Rights Act of 1965, and they widely supported Democratic candidates. O'Hearn notified D'Artois and Caddo Parish Sheriff James M. Goslin that election laws had been violated at three predominately African-American voting precincts in Shreveport.

=== Investigations of D'Artois ===
D'Artois's administration was repeatedly investigated on allegations of mismanagement and corruption. These allegations were covered by journalist Bill Keith of The Shreveport Times, who was later elected as a Louisiana State Senator.

=== Reelection campaigns ===
In the 1970 election, D'Artois received 59.8 percent of the vote in a contest with the Republican nominee William Kimball, who carried the Southern Hills section of south Shreveport. This was a lower percentage than in previous elections. Concerned about growing Republican strength in the state, D'Artois hired James S. "Jim" Leslie (1937–1976), a former Shreveport Times journalist who had become an advertising executive, to manage communications for his campaign for a fourth term as Public Safety Commissioner in 1974. After D'Artois won, he gave Leslie a check for his services that was drawn on city funds. Leslie returned the check and asked that it be reissued on D'Artois's campaign account. According to Leslie, D'Artois gave him another check from city funds. Leslie did not cash either of them. The Times later identified what totaled as a $30,00O felony theft of city funds, allegedly by D'Artois. One of newspaper's lines of investigation led to Leslie, who told its reporter about the two uncancelled city checks from D'Artois.

On July 9, 1976, Leslie was in Baton Rouge; he had spearheaded an ad campaign in support of passage of a right-to-work bill, which was strongly opposed by labor unions. After its narrow passage that night in the Louisiana State Senate, he had celebrated with supporters and colleagues. The victory has often been attributed to the lobbying from the newly organized Louisiana Association of Business and Industry, founded by Edward J. Steimel. Afterward Leslie returned to his hotel, the Prince Murat Inn, before returning home to Shreveport the next day. Leslie parked in one of the few available spaces, near the edge of the parking lot. He was shot and killed instantly by shotgun pellets by an unknown assailant from behind a fence at the edge of the lot. Because of the lack of evidence at the scene, Baton Rouge police described the homicide as a "professional hit."

Rusty Griffith, who had ties to D'Artois, was suspected of being the hired gunman Leslie's murder. It was thought that Leslie was being kept from testifying before a Caddo Parish grand jury about information about D'Artois's administration learned while working on his campaign, or for the alleged attempt to pay him for campaign expense from city funds. Not long after Leslie's death, Griffith was shot and killed in Concordia Parish. D'Artois was soon charged for his alleged involvement in Leslie's slaying on an arrest warrant by East Baton Rouge Parish, signed by 19th Judicial District Judge Douglas Gonzales. He was released for lack of evidence but was forced to resign from office.

Judge John F. Fant, son of the late Mayor Clyde Fant of Shreveport, ordered D'Artois to appear in court on October 13, 1976, to face charges on the $300,000 theft of city funds and the intimidation of witnesses before the grand jury. D'Artois's attorney informed the judge that the former commissioner was too ill to appear.

=== Prosecution ===
D'Artois was arrested again in the Leslie murder case on April 19, 1977, on a warrant signed by Judge Gonzales. He barricaded himself from police in the attic of his house, and insisted that he would never agree to go to the Caddo Parish jail. At the time, D'Artois demanded the use of a typewriter and wrote a statement, which was held by police. D'Artois died on June 11, 1977, before any trial, during heart surgery in San Antonio, Texas. His death meant that the charges against him were never tried or resolved.

In 1976 and 1977, D'Artois's attorney had gotten his trial postponed several times. But in April 1977, Judge William J. Fleniken of the Louisiana 1st Judicial District Court ruled that D'Artois had to stand trial for the felony theft of $300,000 in municipal funds, which had been recorded as paid to police informers. D'Artois's attorney again questioned how his client could be tried, because of his health. Judge Fleniken said prosecutors had to provide doctors and medical equipment at the courthouse during the trial. D'Artois's attorney appealed and the Louisiana Supreme Court ruled that judges had to consider the defendant's overall health in deciding whether a person is too ill for trial.

After D'Artois' death, Elliott Stonecipher, a Shreveport consultant and political analyst described him as "the most powerful ever public official [in Shreveport] ... who dragged the citizenry through the deep ditch of a corruption scandal which forever stained our city." On July 3, 1977, Dr. William E. Hull, the pastor of the First Baptist Church of Shreveport from 1975 to 1987, delivered the sermon "Shreveport at the Crossroads", a condemnation of the scandal engulfing D'Artois. Hull discussed the long-range prospects for the recovery of quality of life in the city.

Stonecipher said that friends told him later that there was "a remarkable silence in the huge sanctuary as the sermon was preached."

A special election was held on October 2, 1977, to choose a successor public service commissioner for the year remaining in D'Artois's term.

D'Artois was interred at Forest Park Cemetery East in Shreveport. Jim Leslie had been interred there the year before.

== Aftermath ==
Council members are elected from single-member districts, enabling broader representation of residents on the council and the expression of minority viewpoints.

== Representation in other media ==
- Bill Keith, a former journalist and state senator, published The Commissioner: A True Story of Deceit, Dishonor, and Death (2009).
- Jere Joiner, a former Shreveport police officer, published Badge of Dishonor (2013), exploring D'Artois's administration and issues of racism, corruption, and alleged murders of Leslie and Griffiths.
- Beyond Galilee: Shreveport and the Struggle for Civil Rights (2012) is a documentary film written by John Kent and T. D. Antoine (as Ted Dewayne), and directed by DeWayne. It covers D'Artois's early resistance to civil rights activists, including his attack of Rev. Harry Blake.
