= Roscoe C. Cranor =

American politician

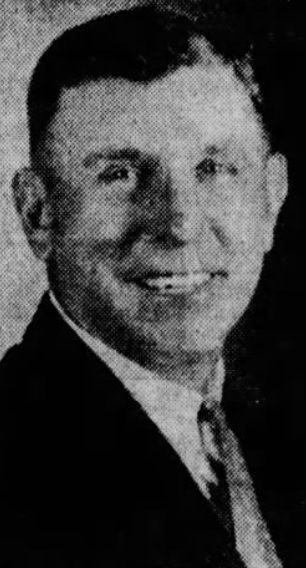
- Cranor in 1938

Member of the Louisiana State Senate
- In office 1935–1940
- Preceded by: Cecil Morgan

Personal details
- Born: Roscoe Carlisle Cranor; February 17, 1880 Missouri, U.S.
- Died: March 5, 1965 (aged 85)
- Party: Democratic

Roscoe Carlisle Cranor (February 17, 1880 – March 5, 1965) was an American politician. He served as a Democratic member of the Louisiana State Senate.

== Life and career ==
Cranor was born in Missouri. He was a locomotive engineer.

Cranor served in the Louisiana State Senate from 1935 to 1940.

Cranor died on March 5, 1965, at the age of 85.
