= 1933 in New Zealand =

- Decades: 1910s; 1920s; 1930s; 1940s; 1950s
- See also: History of New Zealand; List of years in New Zealand; Timeline of New Zealand history

The following lists events that happened during 1933 in New Zealand.

== Population ==
- Estimated population as of 31 December 1933: 1,547,100.
- Increase since previous 31 December 1932: 12,400 (0.81%).
- Males per 100 females: 103.4.

== Incumbents ==
=== Regal and viceregal ===
- Head of State – George V
- Governor-General – The Lord Bledisloe

=== Government ===
The 24th New Zealand Parliament continued with the coalition of the United Party and the Reform Party.

- Speaker of the House – Charles Statham (Independent)
- Prime Minister – George Forbes
- Minister of Finance – William Downie Stewart until 28 January, then Gordon Coates (Reform Party)
- Minister of Foreign Affairs – George Forbes
- Attorney-General – William Downie Stewart until 28 January, then George Forbes
- Chief Justice — Sir Michael Myers

=== Parliamentary opposition ===
- Leader of the Opposition — Harry Holland until his death on 8 October, succeeded 12 October by Michael Joseph Savage (Labour Party).

=== Judiciary ===
- Chief Justice — Sir Michael Myers

=== Main centre leaders ===
- Mayor of Auckland — George Hutchison
- Mayor of Wellington — Thomas Hislop
- Mayor of Christchurch — Dan Sullivan
- Mayor of Dunedin — Robert Black, then Edwin Thomas Cox

== Events ==
- 26 January – Second session of the 24th Parliament commences.
- 10 March – Parliament goes into recess.
- 13 September – Elizabeth McCombs wins the Lyttelton by-election, becoming New Zealand's first female MP.
- 21 September – Parliament recommences.
- 22 December – Second session of the 24th Parliament concludes.
- New Zealand's first distinctive coins issued by the New Zealand Treasury, see New Zealand pound.

== Arts and literature ==
See 1933 in art, 1933 in literature, Category:1933 books

=== Music ===
See: 1933 in music

=== Radio ===
See: Public broadcasting in New Zealand

=== Film ===
See: Category:1933 film awards, 1933 in film, List of New Zealand feature films, Cinema of New Zealand, Category:1933 films

== Sport ==
=== Chess ===
- The 42nd National Chess Championship are held in Auckland, and are won by M.E. Goldstein, of Sydney.

=== Golf ===
- The 23rd New Zealand Open championship is won by Ernie Moss in a playoff against Ted Douglas.
- The 37th National Amateur Championships are held at Titirangi
  - Men – B.V. Wright (Otago)
  - Women – Miss O. Kay (her second title)

=== Horse racing ===
==== Harness racing ====
- New Zealand Trotting Cup – Red Shadow
- Auckland Trotting Cup – Indianapolis

==== Thoroughbred racing ====
- New Zealand Cup – Palantua
- Avondale Gold Cup – King's Knave
- Auckland Cup – Minerval
- Wellington Cup – Royal Artist
- New Zealand Derby – Nightly

=== Lawn bowls ===
The national outdoor lawn bowls championships are held in Wellington.

- Men's singles champion – W.M. Parkhouse (Wellington Bowling Club)
- Men's pair champions – H.S. Maslin, M.J. Squire (skip) (Hawera Bowling Club)
- Men's fours champions – A.R. Hastings, R. McKenzie, J.M. Brackenridge, L.M. Naylor (skip) (Lyall Bay Bowling Club)

=== Rugby league ===
New Zealand national rugby league team

=== Rugby union ===
- The Ranfurly Shield is retained by Canterbury all season, with successful defences against:
  - Ashburton County 31–7
  - Southland 21–3
  - Otago 8–5
  - West Coast 23–14
  - Buller 13–3
  - Taranaki 15–15
  - South Canterbury 6–3
  - King Country 36–0

=== Shooting ===
- Ballinger Belt – Herbert Croxton (Karori)

=== Soccer ===
- The New Zealand national football team tours Australia:
  - 20 May – Lose 0–5 vs New South Wales at Sydney
  - 24 May – Win 1–0 vs South Coast at Bulli
  - 27 May – Lose 1–7 vs Northern Districts at Newcastle
  - 1 June – Lose 4–5 vs Ipswich / West Moreton at Ipswich
  - 3 June – Win 5–1 vs Queensland at Brisbane
  - 5 June – Lose 2–4 vs Australia at Brisbane
  - 10 June – Draw 2–2 vs Australian XI at Newcastle
  - 13 June – Lose 0–1 vs South Maitland at Cessnock
  - 17 June – Lose 4–6 vs Australia at Sydney
  - 21 June – Lose 2–3 vs Metropolis at Sydney
  - 24 June – Lose 2–4 vs Australia at Sydney
  - 26 June – Win 4–2 vs Granville at Granville
  - 28 June – Lose 2–7 vs Gladesville-Ryde at Gladesville
- The Chatham Cup is won by Ponsonby who beat Millerton All Blacks 2–1 in the final.
- Provincial league champions:
  - Auckland – Thistle
  - Waikato – Rotowaro
  - Taranaki – Albion
  - Wanganui – Wanganui Athletic
  - Hawke's Bay – Whakatu
  - Wellington – Petone
  - Nelson – Athletic
  - Canterbury – Thistle
  - Otago – Maori Hill
  - Southland – Corinthians

== Births ==
=== January ===
- 2 January – Ian Axford, space scientist
- 4 January – Desmond Digby, stage designer, book illustrator, painter
- 5 January – Archie Currie, field hockey player
- 9 January – John Morris, cricketer
- 18 January – Frank McMullen, rugby union player and referee

=== February ===
- 14 February
  - John Beedell, canoeist
  - Mildred Sampson, long-distance runner
- 20 February – D. J. Cameron, journalist, sportswriter
- 21 February – Warren Cooper, politician
- 22 February – Alan Kirton, agricultural scientist

=== March ===
- 7 March – Jay Epae, singer
- 8 March – Ronnie Moore, speedway rider
- 10 March – Patricia Bergquist, zoologist
- 11 March – Merv Smith, broadcaster
- 15 March
  - Bernie Galvin, economist and public servant
  - Ian McDonald, neurologist
- 18 March – John Kynoch, sports shooter
- 23 March – Helen Tippett, architect, academic
- 24 March – Trevor de Cleene, politician
- 26 March
  - Ron Chippindale, aircraft accident investigator
  - Henare te Ua, broadcaster
- 31 March – John Butcher, mathematician

=== April ===
- 1 April – Margaret Austin, politician
- 2 April – Maunga Emery, rugby union and rugby league player
- 5 April – Brian Elwood, lawyer, politician, public servant
- 6 April – Gerard Francis Loft, Roman Catholic bishop
- 10 April – Gay Eaton, textile artist
- 11 April – Lance Payne, cyclist
- 16 April – Bill Dillon, politician
- 21 April
  - Bob McDonald, lawn bowls player
  - Cleone Rivett-Carnac, javelin thrower
- 24 April – Rowley Habib, writer
- 28 April – Tim Beaglehole, historian

=== May ===
- 5 May – Colin Maiden, mechanical engineer, university administrator
- 10 May – Barry Smith, evangelist
- 15 May
  - Michael Dean, television broadcaster
  - Ronald Hemi, rugby union player, cricketer
- 31 May – Peter Bromhead, cartoonist

=== June ===
- 1 June – Ian Sinclair, cricketer
- 8 June – Peter Lucas, rower
- 13 June – Brian Johnston, field hockey player
- 17 June – George Griffiths, journalist, historian, writer
- 20 June – Duncan Laing, swimming coach
- 21 June – Jack Fagan, rugby league player
- 29 June – June Blackburn, long jumper

=== July ===
- 4 July – Pam Williams, businesswoman, philanthropist
- 7 July
  - Murray Halberg, athlete, philanthropist
  - Peter Gresham, politician (died 2024)
- 9 July – Gordon Vette, airline pilot
- 13 July – John Lithgow, politician
- 15 July – Tom McNab, association footballer
- 18 July – Kevin Ireland, writer
- 20 July – David Donald, cricketer
- 22 July – Robin M. Startup, philatelist
- 27 July – Roger Harris, cricketer

=== August ===
- 10 August – Paratene Matchitt, artist
- 17 August – Jules Le Lievre, rugby union player
- 21 August – Don McLaren, businessman, horseracing administrator
- 25 August – Johnny Halafihi, professional boxer

=== September ===
- 2 September – Patricia Prain, alpine skier
- 4 September – Greg Aim, cricketer, sports and arts administrator
- 5 September – George Petersen, biochemist
- 17 September – Patrick O'Farrell, historian
- 26 September – Malcolm Simpson, cyclist
- 30 September – Niel Wright, writer

=== October ===
- 5 October – Dave O'Sullivan, Thoroughbred racehorse trainer
- 8 October – Dick Haggie, rugby league player
- 9 October – Alby Duckmanton, cricket player and administrator
- 13 October – Philip Sherry, broadcaster, politician
- 17 October – Trevor H. Howard-Hill, English literature academic
- 18 October – Dave Crowe, cricketer
- 21 October – Neil Ritchie, cyclist
- 27 October – Earle Wells, sailor
- 30 October – Col Campbell, gardening broadcaster
- 31 October – John Buxton, rugby union player

=== November ===
- 1 November – Denis Hanrahan, Roman Catholic bishop
- 10 November – Don Clarke, rugby union player
- 11 November – Pamela Barham, netball player and coach
- 24 November – Peter Webb, art dealer and gallery director
- 29 November – Wilf Malcolm, mathematician, university administrator

=== December ===
- 10 December – Gren Alabaster, cricketer
- 17 December
  - Jeremy Commons, opera historian
  - Bruce Morrison, cricketer
- 18 December – Roger Sandall, anthropologist
- 26 December – Keith Butler, cricketer
- 27 December – Frank Rogers, politician

=== Exact date not given ===
- Peter Beadle, artist
- Eric Matthews, wrestler
- Tom McCabe, association footballer
- Keita Meretana, professional wrestler
- Noelene Swinton, high jumper

== Deaths ==
=== January–March ===
- 9 January
  - Frank Milne, mountaineer and guide (born 1891)
  - Walter Wright, painter (born 1866)
- 16 January – John Burt, rugby union player, cricketer, businessman (born 1874)
- 22 January – Henry Fletcher, Presbyterian missionary and minister (born 1868)
- 25 January – Harry Kennedy, politician (born c. 1858)
- 5 February – Maria Mackay, nurse, midwife (born 1844)
- 10 March – Ben Biddle, soldier (born 1843)
- 19 March – Tommy Solomon, Moriori leader (born 1884)
- 22 March – Ada Wells, feminist, social worker (born 1863)
- 29 March
  - Harold Thomas, boxer (born 1909)
  - Hoani Paraone Tunuiarangi, Ngāti Kahungunu and Rangitāne leader (born c. 1843)

=== April–June ===
- 6 April – James Moore, cricketer (born 1877)
- 7 April – Alfred Dunlop, tennis player (born 1875)
- 9 April – Charles Monro, rugby union pioneer (born 1851)
- 2 May – William Barker McEwan, librarian (born 1870)
- 8 May – James Johnstone, businessman, stock breeder (born 1859)
- 11 May – George Humphreys, rugby union player (born 1870)
- 17 May – Emmet McHardy, Roman Catholic missionary (born 1904)
- 20 May – Sir Thomas Sidey, politician (born 1863)
- 10 June – Frank Cooke, lawyer and cricketer (born 1862)
- 24 June – Heni Te Kiri Karamu, Te Arawa leader, warrior, interpreter (born 1840)
- 27 June – Ernest Hayes, engineer, inventor (born 1851)

=== July–September ===
- 6 July – John Court, businessman, politician, philanthropist (born 1846)
- 10 July – Wiremu Rikihana, Te Rarawa leader, politician (born 1851)
- 15 July
  - Henry Hill, educationalist, politician, mayor of Napier (1917–19) (born 1849)
  - David Theomin, merchant, philanthropist, collector (born 1852)
- 26 July – Samuel Lawry, Methodist minister (born 1854)
- 29 July – Sandy Paterson, rugby union player (born 1885)
- 2 August – James McCombs, politician (born 1873)
- 6 August – Hart Udy, rugby union player (born 1857)
- 9 August – Hone Riiwi Toia, Ngāpuhi leader, prophet (born c. 1859)
- 12 August – Hugh Northcote, Anglican clergyman, writer on sex (born 1868)
- 25 August – G. M. Thomson, scientist, politician (born 1848)
- 31 August – Archibald McNicol, politician (born 1878)
- 4 September – Joseph Kemp, Christian fundamentalist leader (born 1872)
- 24 September – Raymond McIntyre, artist, art critic (born 1879)

=== October–December ===
- 1 October
  - Lord Ranfurly, governor of New Zealand (1897–1904) (born 1856)
  - Te Rata Mahuta, fourth Māori King (1912–1933) (born c. 1880)
- 2 October – Anton Teutenberg, stonemason, carver, engraver, medallist, jeweller (born 1840)
- 5 October – Samuel Hurst Seager, architect (born 1855)
- 7 October – William Still Littlejohn, cricketer, schoolteacher (born 1859)
- 8 October – Harry Holland, politician (born 1868)
- 13 October – Mary McCarthy, temperance worker, political activist (born 1866)
- 23 October – Bert Lowe, boxer (born 1912)
- 27 October – Lancelot Hemus, cricketer (born 1881)
- 28 October
  - Harriet Heron, businesswoman (born c. 1836)
  - Charles Reade, town planner (born 1880)
- 9 November – Pepene Eketone, interpreter, native agent, politician (born c. 1856)
- 16 November – John Lomas, trade unionist, public servant (born 1848)
- 21 November – Samuel Manning, brewer, politician, mayor of Christchurch (1889–90) (born 1841)
- 30 November – Aroha Clifford, aviator (born 1908)
- 8 December – Thomas Kingsland, cricketer (born 1862)
- 13 December – Calasanctius Howley, Roman Catholic nun, teacher (born 1848)

== See also ==
- History of New Zealand
- List of years in New Zealand
- Military history of New Zealand
- Timeline of New Zealand history
- Timeline of New Zealand's links with Antarctica
- Timeline of the New Zealand environment
