= James Moore =

James, Jim, or Jimmy Moore may refer to:

== Authors ==
- James Moore (Cornish author) (1929–2017), author of works on George Gurdjieff
- James Moore (biographer) (born 1947), author of biographies of Charles Darwin
- James W. Moore (author) (1938–2019), author of Christian ministry literature
- James A. Moore (born 1965), horror and fantasy author
- James C. Moore, author of Bush's Brain: How Karl Rove Made George W. Bush Presidential
- James P. Moore Jr. (born 1953), author, professor, television commentator and lecturer

== Music and performing arts ==
- James Moore (actor) (born 1992), English actor
- Butch Moore (James Augustine Moore, 1938–2001), Irish showband icon during the 1960s
- James Moore (singer) (1956–2000), American gospel artist
- James E. Moore Jr. (1951–2022), American composer
- Slim Harpo (James Isaac Moore, 1924–1970), blues musician
- Jim Moore, actor who performed in Coonskin

== Politicians ==
- James Moore (Canadian politician) (born 1976), Canadian cabinet minister
- James Percy Moore, Canadian politician from Ontario
- Jim Moore (politician) (1927–2017), Montana state senator
- James Moore (Newfoundland politician) (1869–1946), Newfoundland merchant and politician
- James William Moore (1818–1877), Confederate politician during the American Civil War
- James Moore Sr. (c. 1650–1706), governor of Carolina from 1700 to 1703
- James Moore Jr. (c. 1682–1724), governor of South Carolina from 1719 to 1721
- James Aaron Moore, member of the Mississippi House of Representatives

== Sports ==
=== Baseball ===
- James Moore (baseball) (1916–2016), professional baseball player in the Negro leagues, also known as Red Moore
- Jim Moore (baseball) (1903–1973), pitcher in Major League Baseball
- Jimmy Moore (baseball) (1903–1986), left fielder in Major League Baseball

=== Football ===
- Jimmy Moore (footballer, born 1889) (1889–1972), English international football player for Derby County
- James Moore (footballer, born 1891) (1891–1972), English football player for Barnsley, Southampton and Leeds United
- James Moore (footballer, born 1987), English football player for Charlotte Eagles
- Jim Moore (Australian footballer) (1891–1987), Australian rules footballer for Essendon and Melbourne

=== Other sports ===
- Bouncy Moore (James E. Moore, born 1951), American long jumper
- Jim Moore (long jumper, born 1943), American long jumper, 1965 All-American for the Purdue Boilermakers track and field team
- James Moore (New Zealand cricketer) (1877–1933), New Zealand cricketer
- Jemmy Moore (James Moore, 1839–1890), Australian cricketer
- James Moore (cyclist) (1849–1935), English cycling racer
- Cowboy Jimmy Moore (1910–1999), American pool champion
- James Moore (boxer) (born 1978), Irish professional boxer
- James Moore (fencer) (1890–1971), American Olympic fencer
- James Moore (pentathlete) (born 1935), American Olympic silver medalist in modern pentathlon at the 1964 Summer Olympics
- Jimmy Moore (basketball, born 1973), American basketball player
- Jimmy Moore (basketball, born 1952), American basketball player
- James Moore (rugby union) (born 1993), Australian rugby union player

== Other ==
- James Moore (furniture designer) (died 1726), English cabinet maker
- James Moore (Continental Army officer) (1737–1777), American Revolutionary War general
- James Moore (engineer) (1826–1887), Australian railway engineer
- James Moore (bishop) (1834–1904), Irish-born Bishop of Ballarat, Victoria
- James Beach Moore (1842–1931), Canadian Quaker
- James Edward Moore (1902–1986), U.S. Army general
- Jimmy Moore (bishop) (1933–2005), Irish bishop
- James F. Moore (born 1948), senior fellow at Harvard Law School's Berkman Center for Internet and Society
- James G. Moore (born 1930), Scientist Emeritus, U.S. Geological Survey
- James T. Moore (meteorologist) (1952–2006), American atmospheric scientist from Cornell University and Saint Louis University
- James E. Moore (judge) (1936–2006)), associate justice of the South Carolina Supreme Court
- James T. Moore (USMC) (1895–1953), United States Marine Corps general
- James L. Moore III, academic administrator at the Ohio State University
- Jim Moore (photographer), American photographer
- James W. Moore (legal scholar) (1905–1994), Sterling Professor at Yale Law School
- James Vernell Moore, defendant in United States v. Moore (1988)
- SS James Bennett Moore, a Liberty ship

== See also ==
- James Moor
- Jamie Moore
