= V. C. Shannon =

American politician (1910–1989)

Varyon Cullie "V. C." Shannon

Louisiana State Representative from District 4 (Caddo Parish)
- In office 1972–1979
- Preceded by: At-large delegation: Lonnie O. Aulds; Algie D. Brown; Frank Fulco; P. J. Mills; Jimmy Strain; Dayton H. Waller, Jr. Don W. Williamson
- Succeeded by: Single-member district: Robert P. "Bobby" Waddell

Personal details
- Born: May 2, 1910 Port Gibson; Claiborne County; Mississippi, US
- Died: January 30, 1989 (aged 78)
- Resting place: Centuries Memorial Park in Shreveport, Louisiana
- Party: Democratic

Varyon Cullie Shannon, known as V. C. Shannon (May 2, 1910 – June 1, 1989), was a Democratic member of the Louisiana House of Representatives from Shreveport in Caddo Parish in northwestern Louisiana. He served from 1972 until 1979. He was the first to hold the newly created District 4 seat, having been successful in the general election held on February 1, 1972.

The Shannon family has roots in McCracken County, Kentucky. Shannon's grandfather, Benjamin Franklin Shannon Jr. (died c. 1904), fought for the Confederate States of America in the Civil War and was in 1864 a prisoner of war in Illinois. Shannon's father, John Oscar Shannon (1887–1958), was a merchant and farmer in Port Gibson in Claiborne County in western Mississippi. In 1908, John Shannon married Pearl Van (died 1964) in a ceremony performed by the then mayor of Port Gibson. John and Pearl had two sons, V. C. and Floyd Oscar Shannon (born 1914). Both Floyd and V. C. Shannon relocated to Shreveport.

Shannon and his wife, the former Claire Wood (1912–1974), had two sons, the late D. Kenneth Shannon Sr., of Birmingham, Alabama, and Varyon Stacey Shannon (1934–2009), a graduate of C. E. Byrd High School in Shreveport and Louisiana State University. A veteran of the Korean War, the junior Shannon was a businessman involved for many years in the waste disposal industry in Baton Rouge. Also, they had one daughter, Connie Gaile Shannon Emmons, who resides in Shreveport, Louisiana, born on July 10, 1941, is a graduate of Fair Park High School and Ayers Career College.

It is unknown when Shannon relocated to Shreveport, presumably well before 1950. Nor is his occupation available. His House tenure corresponded with the first two terms of Governor Edwin Edwards. Shannon left the legislature with about a year remaining in his second term. He resigned and was succeeded by fellow Democrat Robert P. "Bobby" Waddell, subsequently a judge of the Louisiana 1st Judicial District in Caddo Parish.

Shannon and his wife, Claire, who preceded him in death by nearly fifteen years, are interred at Centuries Memorial Park in Shreveport.

Political offices
Preceded by At-large delegation: Lonnie O. Aulds; Algie D. Brown; Frank Fulco; P. J. Mills; Jimmy Strain; Dayton Waller, Jr. Don W. Williamson	Louisiana State Representative for District 4 (Caddo Parish); 1972–1979	Succeeded by Single-member district: Robert P. "Bobby" Waddell
