= Mary McCarthy =

Mary McCarthy or Mary MacCarthy may refer to:

== The arts ==
- Mary Downing (1815–1881), Irish poet born Mary McCarthy
- Mary Stanislaus MacCarthy (1849–1897), Irish poet and nun
- Mary MacCarthy (1882–1953), English writer and member of the Bloomsbury Group
- Mary Eunice McCarthy (1899–1969), American screenwriter, playwright, and journalist
- Mary McCarthy (American writer) (1912–1989), American novelist, critic, and memoirist
- Mary McCarthy (screenwriter), American, screenwriter for movies Theodora Goes Wild (1936) and Sister Kenny (1946)
- Mary McCarthy (Irish novelist) (1951–2013), Irish novelist, teacher, book reviewer

== Other ==
- Mary McCarthy (activist) (1866–1933), New Zealand temperance advocate and teacher
- Mary McCarthy Gomez Cueto (1900–2009), wealthy Canadian expatriate who lived an impoverished life in Havana
- Mary McCarthy (police officer) (1903–1978), Australian police officer
- Mary McCarthy (CIA) (born 1945), former CIA employee accused of leaking information
- Mary Ann McCarthy (1834–1887), Irish orphan who fatally stabbed her husband
