= Adrienne Simpson =

New Zealand musicologist, writer, and broadcaster (1943–2010)

- Born: 26 November 1943; Wellington, New Zealand
- Died: 4 December 2010 (aged 67); Wellington, New Zealand
- Education: Wellington Girls' College
- Alma mater: Victoria University of Wellington; King's College London; Charles University
- Occupations: Broadcaster; historian; musicologist; writer
- Years active: 1966–2010
- Spouse: Richard Chilton
- Children: 1

Adrienne Marie Chilton (née Simpson; 26 November 1943 – 4 December 2010) was a New Zealand broadcaster, historian, musicologist and writer. Her works focused on biographies, cricket, music, popular culture and social commentary. She was a professor of general musicianship and musical history at the Guildhall School of Music and Drama for 18 years. Simpson regularly broadcast for the BBC and Radio New Zealand and was a research fellow at both the National Library of New Zealand and her first alma mater, the Victoria University of Wellington.

== Early life ==
Born in Wellington, New Zealand on 26 November 1943, Simpson was brought up in an engineering family in Kelburn. She attended Wellington Girls' College, and graduated with a post-graduate Master of Arts degree in music history from the Victoria University of Wellington in 1964. Simpson relocated to the United Kingdom in 1965 and graduated from King's College London with a Master of Music title under Thurston Dart in 1966. She received a grant from the British Council to go Charles University in Prague and study Czech music.

== Career ==
For 18 years, Simpson taught general musicalship and musical history at the Guildhall School of Music and Drama as a professor. She played the flute, the piano and recorder as she conducted research and did writing. Her research into lute music resulted in her becoming editor of the Lute Society Journal from 1971 to 1972 and she became interested in 19th-century Czech music upon developing a close association with Gerald Abraham. Simpson frequently broadcast on the BBC and Radio New Zealand (RNZ); she presented programmes such as Composer of the Week and Pressing On as well as major series on Czech music and opera during a quarter-of-a-century stint on RNZ Concert. She presented a five-part hour-long programmes on the New Zealand Opera Company's history during the 1950s and the 1960s. Simpson went back to New Zealand in 1983. She was a research fellow of the National Library of New Zealand in 1991, and was a John David Stout research fellow at the Victoria University of Wellington in 1993.

Her works were published in Australia, New Zealand and the United Kingdom, and freelanced from her home in suburban Wellington and later Paraparaumu. Simpson's works focused on biographies, music, popular culture and social commentary. Her books include Easy Lute Music in 1975 of which she was editor. She authored Opera in New Zealand in 1990; The Book of New Zealand Woman in 1991; both The New Grove Dictionary of Opera and The International Dictionary of Opera in 1992; and co-wrote the 1992 book Southern Voices: International Opera Singers of New Zealand with Peter Downes. She edited The Greatest Ornaments of Their Profession: The New Zealand Tours by the Simonsen Opera Companies, 1876–1889 that was published in 1993. Simpson authored Women Together in 1993 and the chapter The Orchestral Recorder for Cambridge University Press's Companion to the Recorder two years later. She edited Classic Kiwi Sport: Cricket in 1996; co-authored Opera's Farthest Frontier: A History of Professional Opera in New Zealand with Geoffrey Newson that same year; The Oxford Companion to Australian Music in 1997; Alex Lindsay – the Man and his Orchestra with Newson the following year; and contributed to Sport, Society and Culture in New Zealand in 1999.

In 2000, she wrote a history of Wellington City Opera in her book Capital Opera: Wellington's Opera Company, 1982–1999. Simpson contributed to The New Grove Dictionary of Music and Musicians in the same year; Alice May: Gilbert and Sullivan's First Prima Donna which was published as a commissioned work for American publishers in 2003; Hallelujahs and History: The Auckland Choral Society, 1855–2005 in 2005 and The Centenary History of The Theatre Royal Christchurch in 2008. She was a contributor to the Dictionary of New Zealand Biography, Volumes 2–5 that were edited by Claudia Orange, the Royal Musical Association Research Chronicle; The Musical Times; the Journal of the American Lute Society; The Consort; the Women's Studies Journal; the New Zealand Journal of History and the Australasian Music Research journals. Between 1988 and 1990, Simpson was president of the New Zealand Opera Society, was founder-editor of Early Music New Zealand from 1985 to 1988, and was co-ordinator for the New Grove Dictionary of Music and Musicians in New Zealand. She volunteered at the New Zealand Cricket Museum at the Basin Reserve and, before her death, was about to complete the book New Zealand's Wicket Women: A History of Women's Cricket in New Zealand that would be finished by her daughter and a colleague of Simpson's.

== Personal life ==
Simpson was married to Richard Chilton. She died in Wellington, New Zealand on 4 December 2010.
