= John Lomas =

John Lomas may refer to:

- John Lomas (trade unionist) (1848–1933), New Zealand coalminer, trade unionist and public servant
- John Lomas (cricketer) (1917–1945), English cricketer
- John Lomas (RAF officer) (1920–2019), RAF intelligence officer
- John Lomas (bishop) (born 1958), Bishop of Swansea and Brecon
- John Lomas (martyr), one of the Canterbury Martyrs
