= William McEwan (disambiguation) =

William McEwan or William MacEwan may refer to:

- William McEwan (1827–1913), Scottish brewer and politician
- William Barker McEwan (1870–1933), New Zealand librarian
- Bill McEwan, Canadian businessman
- Bill McEwan (rugby union), Scottish rugby player
- Willie McEwan (golfer) (1872–1931), Scottish golfer

== See also ==
- Sir William Macewen (1848–1924), Scottish surgeon and neuroscientist
