= Charles Roemer =

Charles Roemer may refer to:

- Buddy Roemer (1943–2021), American politician, investor and banker, governor of Louisiana
- Charles E. Roemer II (1923–2012), his father, American farmer and businessman from Louisiana
