= Trevor Hill =

Trevor Hill may refer to:

- Trevor Hill, 1st Viscount Hillsborough, Anglo-Irish landowner and politician
- Trevor Hill (producer), British writer, producer and director for the BBC

== See also ==
- Trevor H. Howard-Hill, New Zealand born scholar of English literature
