= John Shrapnell =

New Zealand journalist (1934-2020)

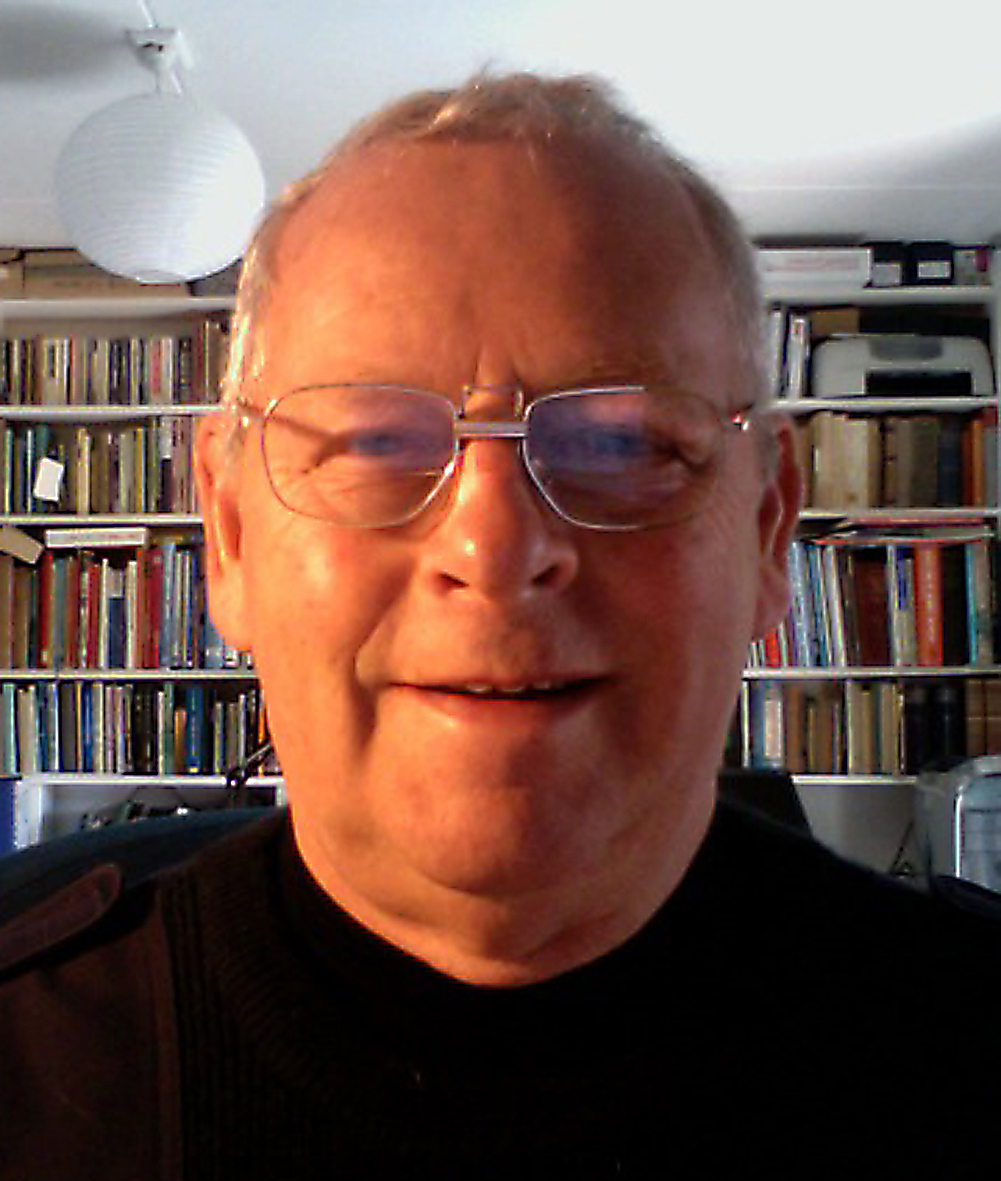
- Born: John Gordon Shrapnell; 25 December 1934; London, England
- Died: 2 September 2020 (aged 85); Wellington, New Zealand
- Occupations: Journalist, actor, singer

John Gordon Shrapnell (25 December 1934 – 2 September 2020) was a New Zealand television journalist turned singer-actor.

== Early life and family ==
Shrapnell was born in London, the son of Lillian Jeannette (née Walker) and Alfred Shrapnell. He is a descendant of British army officer General Henry Shrapnel, inventor of the shrapnel shell.

== Television ==
When television began in New Zealand in the early 1960s, Shrapnell was one of the two editors of NZBC Television Newsreel and producer of The Veteran Statesman. In 1964 Shrapnell returned to the United Kingdom to become reporter on COI's London Line and BBC's Today, as well as Duty Editor at Visnews.

In 1966 Shrapnell returned to New Zealand as reporter/director of Town and Around and Network News. He directed and produced many documentaries for the series Sunday's World. He also produced reports on two of the early New Zealand dance companies, namely Limbs and Impulse Dance Theatre. As coordinator of NZBC's Royal Visit coverage, Shrapnell had met the Queen and members of her family on several occasions.

Shrapnell became a naturalised New Zealand citizen in 1974.

== Actor-singer ==
As an actor Shrapnell appeared in Revelations – The Initial Journey, The Insider's Guide To Happiness, Blonde Cargo, Market Forces, The Strip, and A Question of Justice. As a singer Shrapnell sang with various companies including Wellington City Opera and The NBR New Zealand Opera.

Shrapnell was often confused with his cousin, veteran British actor John Shrapnel. When the two met in London, the English Shrapnel said he was jealous that the New Zealand Shrapnell had met and talked with the Queen. The New Zealand Shrapnell replied that he was jealous the London Shrapnel had got to act with Julia Roberts.

Shrapnell died in Wellington on 2 September 2020, at the age of 85.
