= 1972 Louisiana gubernatorial election =

- February 1, 1972
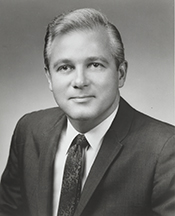

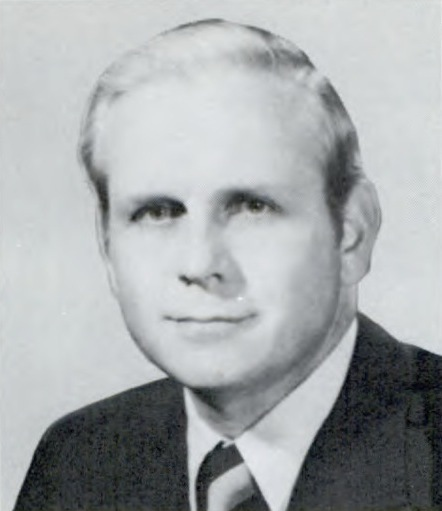
| Nominee | Edwin Edwards | David Treen |
| Party | Democratic | Republican |
| Popular vote | 641,146 | 480,424 |
| Percentage | 57.17% | 42.83% |
- Parish results Edwards: 50–60% 60–70% 70–80% 80–90% Treen: 50–60% 60–70%
Governor before election
John McKeithen
Democratic
Elected Governor
Edwin Edwards
Democratic

The 1972 Louisiana gubernatorial election was held on February 1, 1972. Edwin Edwards defeated Republican candidate David Treen to become Governor of Louisiana.

Edwards's victory was the first time a Roman Catholic had been elected to the state's governorship since Francis T. Nicholls left office in 1892.

Party primaries were held on November 6, 1971, and a run-off was held for the Democratic nomination on December 18, 1971. These were the last closed primaries for governor of Louisiana before the state adopted its current primary election system.

This was also the last gubernatorial election not to take place in an off-year, as all elections starting from 1975 would take place one year before a presidential election.

== Democratic primary ==
=== Candidates ===
- Taddy Aycock, lieutenant governor
- Samuel Bell Sr.
- Harold Lee Bethune II
- David L. Chandler
- Huey P. Coleman
- Jimmie Davis, former governor, 1944–1948 and 1960–1964
- Edwin Edwards, U.S. representative from Crowley
- J. Bennett Johnston, state senator from Shreveport
- Gillis Long, former U.S. representative from Alexandria
- Speedy Long, U.S. representative from LaSalle Parish
- Warren J. "Puggy" Moity
- James Moore
- Frank T. Salter Jr.
- John G. Schwegman, grocery store magnate and state senator from Metairie
- Jimmy Strain, pediatrician and state representative from Shreveport
- Addison Roswell Thompson, perennial candidate and white supremacist

=== Campaign ===
Early in the campaign, many political analysts predicted that the race's top candidates would be Gillis Long, Jimmie Davis, and C.C. "Taddy" Aycock. However, the two candidates to make the runoff, Edwin Edwards and J. Bennett Johnston, were relative newcomers to the Louisiana political scene, despite Edwards' congressional tenure.

Cousins Gillis and Speedy Long both ran in a rematch of their 1964 primary race for Congress, when Speedy unseated Gillis. Ironically, Gillis reclaimed that House seat the next year, when Speedy retired after Edwards and the Louisiana Legislature redistricted him into the same district as longtime incumbent Otto Passman.

=== Results ===
1971 Democratic gubernatorial primary
| Party | Candidate | Votes | % |
|---|---|---|---|
| Democratic | Edwin Edwards | 276,397 | 23.54% |
| Democratic | J. Bennett Johnston | 208,830 | 17.79% |
| Democratic | Gillis William Long | 164,276 | 13.99% |
| Democratic | Jimmie H. Davis | 138,756 | 11.82% |
| Democratic | John G. Schwegmann | 92,072 | 7.84% |
| Democratic | Taddy Aycock | 88,465 | 7.54% |
| Democratic | Samuel Bell Sr. | 72,486 | 6.17% |
| Democratic | Speedy Long | 61,359 | 5.23% |
| Democratic | Frank T. Salter Jr. | 32,203 | 2.74% |
| Democratic | James Moore | 9,408 | 0.80% |
| Democratic | Warren J. "Puggy" Moity | 8,965 | 0.76% |
| Democratic | David L. Chandler | 7,244 | 0.62% |
| Democratic | Huey P. Coleman | 4,833 | 0.41% |
| Democratic | Harold Lee Bethune II | 3,032 | 0.26% |
| Democratic | Wilford L. Thompson Sr. | 2,535 | 0.21% |
| Democratic | Addison Roswell Thompson | 1,924 | 0.16% |
| Democratic | Jimmy Strain | 1,258 | 0.11% |
| Total votes | | 1,182,043 | 100.00% |

=== Run-off ===
1971 Democratic gubernatorial run-off
| Party | Candidate | Votes | % | ±% |
|---|---|---|---|---|
| Democratic | Edwin Edwards | 584,262 | 50.19% | ▲26.65 |
| Democratic | J. Bennett Johnston | 579,774 | 49.81% | ▲32.02 |
| Total votes | | 1,164,036 | 100.00% | |

== Republican primary ==
=== Candidates ===
- Robert Max Ross
- Dave Treen, congressman who eventually served as Louisiana governor from 1980 to 1984 (defeated in 1983 for re-election by Edwin W. Edwards, who was making a return to the governorship after having been term-limited from running for re-election in 1979)

=== Campaign ===
The GOP primary with only two candidates and a lopsided victory for Treen led the New York Times to characterize it as "the most concentrated Republican campaign for state office in recent history."

=== Results ===
1971 Republican gubernatorial primary
| Party | Candidate | Votes | % |
|---|---|---|---|
| Republican | Dave Treen | 9,732 | 92.06% |
| Republican | Robert Max Ross | 839 | 7.94% |
| Total votes | | 10,571 | 100.00% |

== General election ==
=== Campaign ===
Edwards and Treen both "jabbed consistently at corruption and in efficiency in government and promised to shore up the state's financial condition."

Treen had never previously been elected to public office, and Edwards focused on his experience in contrast to Treen's lack of it. Treen argued that Edwards could not be a true reform candidate, due to his experience.

If Treen had been elected, he would have been the first Republican occupant of the Louisiana governorship since 1877.

=== Results ===
1972 Louisiana gubernatorial election
| Party | Candidate | Votes | % | ±% |
|---|---|---|---|---|
| Democratic | Edwin Edwards | 641,146 | 57.2% | ▼42.8 |
| Republican | Dave Treen | 480,424 | 42.8% | N/A |
| Total votes | | 1,121,570 | 100.00% | |

== Sources ==
- Louisiana Secretary of State. Primary Election Returns, 1971
