= Henry Fletcher =

Henry Fletcher may refer to:

- Sir Henry Fletcher, 1st Baronet, of Hutton le Forest (died 1645)
- Sir Henry Fletcher, 3rd Baronet, of Hutton le Forest (1661–1712), English MP for Cockermouth
- Henry Fletcher (engraver) (fl. 1710–1750), English engraver
- Sir Henry Fletcher, 1st Baronet, of Clea Hall (1727–1807), British MP for Cumberland
- Sir Henry Aubrey-Fletcher, 4th Baronet (1835–1910), British MP for Horsham and Lewes
- Sir Henry Aubrey-Fletcher, 6th Baronet (1887–1969), Lord Lieutenant of Buckinghamshire 1954–1961
- Sir Henry Aubrey-Fletcher, 8th Baronet (born 1945), Lord Lieutenant of Buckinghamshire since 2006
- Henry A. Fletcher (1839–1897), American Civil War veteran and Lieutenant Governor of Vermont
- Henry Fletcher (mayor) (1859–1953), mayor of Providence, Rhode Island 1909–1913
- Henry P. Fletcher (1873–1959), U.S. diplomat and RNC chair
- Henry Fletcher (cricketer) (1882–1937), English cricketer
- Henry Fletcher (missionary) (1868–1933), New Zealand missionary and Presbyterian minister
- Henry Allason Fletcher (1834–1884]], English engineer and locomotive designer
- Henry Fletcher, pen name of Fletcher Hanks

== See also ==
- Henry Fletcher House, historic house in Massachusetts, U.S.A.
- Henry Fletcher Hance (1827–1886), British diplomat
- Harry Fletcher (disambiguation)
