= Harry Fletcher =

Harry or Harold Fletcher may refer to:

== Scientists ==
- Harold Fletcher, assistant zoologist on the 1929–31 British Australian and New Zealand Antarctic Research Expedition
- Harold Fletcher (botanist) (1907–1978), English botanist
- Harold Oswald Fletcher (1903–1996), Australian palaeontologist

== Sportsmen ==
- Harry Fletcher (footballer, born 1873) (1873–1923), English footballer
- Harry Fletcher (Scottish footballer) (1879–1917), Scottish amateur footballer for Queen's Park

== Others ==
- Harry Fletcher (politician) (1910–1990), Australian politician

== See also ==
- Henry Fletcher (disambiguation)
