= Lonnie O. Aulds =

American politician (1925–1984)

Lonnie Odell Aulds

Louisiana State Representative for Caddo Parish
- In office 1968–1972
- Preceded by: At-large delegation: Algie D. Brown; Frank Fulco; Morley A. Hudson; J. Bennett Johnston, Jr. Taylor W. O'Hearn
- Succeeded by: Single-member district

Member of Caddo Parish Police Jury
- In office 1960–1968

Personal details
- Born: August 14, 1925 Near Farmerville, Louisiana, US
- Died: March 22, 1984 (aged 58) Shreveport, Louisiana, US
- Party: Democratic
- Education: Centenary College of Louisiana
- Occupation: Businessman

Military service
- Branch/service: United States Navy
- Battles/wars: World War II Pacific Theater of Operations

Lonnie Odell Aulds (August 14, 1925 – March 22, 1984) was a businessman from Shreveport, Louisiana, who was a Democratic member of the Louisiana House of Representatives from Shreveport in Caddo Parish in northwestern Louisiana. He served a single term from 1968 until 1972.

== Background ==
Aulds was born near Farmerville in Union Parish in North Louisiana to Henry Leonard Aulds, Sr., and the former Hazel Duty. According to the 1940 census, he had two brothers, Henry Leonard Aulds, Jr., and Charles Glen Aulds, and two sisters, Lillian (later Armstrong) and Nellie Sue (later Davis), who were eleven years apart in age. He served from 1943 to 1946 in the United States Navy in the Pacific Theater of Operations during World War II.

Aulds graduated in 1950 from Centenary College in Shreveport and later taught real estate in night school there. In 1957, he organized the Aulds-Horne & White Investment Company in Shreveport and was a principal in the real estate firm, Woodland Development Corporation. He was a president of the North Louisiana Economic Development Corporation. Highly active in various civic and community organizations, he was affiliated with the Jaycees and then the Chamber of Commerce. Aulds was a member of the Kiwanis Club, the Benevolent and Protective Order of Elks, Masonic lodge, Shriners, the Forty and Eight veterans organization, and the American Legion.

== Political career ==
Aulds was an elected member of the Caddo Parish Police Jury from 1960 to 1968. He was the jury vice president in 1963 and the president from 1964 to 1966. The police jury, the parish governing body, is now known as the Caddo Parish Commission. In 1966, Aulds was a candidate for the Louisiana State Board of Education for the seat representing the 4th congressional district. He vowed if elected to work to expand vocational education and higher education opportunities in the district. He lost to fellow Democrat and incumbent board member Robert H. Curry of Shreveport. That board was reorganized under the Louisiana Constitution of 1974 into the Board of Elementary and Secondary Education. Another candidate in the race, Cecil K. Carter, Jr., was later elected to a term in the Louisiana State Senate.

In 1967, as a police juror and with extensive experience in real estate, he was a member of the site selection committee for the Northwest Louisiana School for the Mentally Retarded. The seven-member committee was headed by then State Representative and later U.S. Senator J. Bennett Johnston, Jr. Other members of the panel included Representative Frank Fulco, later Representative P. J. Mills, and Edgar Hull, dean of the Louisiana State University Health Sciences Center Shreveport. The completed facility is now known as the Northwest Louisiana Developmental Center, located at 5401 Shed Road in Bossier City.

Aulds left the police jury to run successfully for the state House of Representatives in the 1967–1968 election cycle, when Democrats swept the Caddo Parish offices. His colleagues included the Shreveport businessman Dayton Waller as well as the long-term members Algie D. Brown and Frank Fulco. Early in his first session of the legislature the freshman Aulds was named to replace veteran Representative Fulco on the House Budget Committee at the request of Governor John McKeithen. The matter sparked discord in the Caddo Parish delegation, but McKeithen tried to smooth over the hard feelings with self-deprecating humor in an engagement in Shreveport in mid-February 1969.

== Personal life ==
At forty-four, Aulds on December 31, 1969, married 20-year-old Katherin B. Aulds in Harrison County, Texas. Katherin Aulds was a florist for twenty-five years until she became a funeral home owner after completion of the course in mortuary science at Southern University at Shreveport. Their son is James Linard Aulds (born c. 1972).

Aulds died in Shreveport at the age of fifty-eight. He was a member of the First United Methodist Church on Texas Avenue in downtown Shreveport.

Political offices
Preceded by At-large delegation: Algie D. Brown; Frank Fulco; Morley A. Hudson; J. Bennett Johnston, Jr. Taylor W. O'Hearn	Louisiana State Representative from Caddo Parish; Lonnie Odell Aulds; 1968–1972	Succeeded by Single-member district
