= Greg Aim =

New Zealand cricketer

Personal information
- Full name: Gregory Martyn Aim
- Born: 4 September 1933; Wellington, New Zealand
- Died: 1 April 2005 (aged 71); Wellington, New Zealand
- Batting: Right-handed
- Bowling: Right-arm medium
- Role: Batsman

Domestic team information
- Years: Team
- 1955/56: Otago
- 1960/61–1962/63: Wellington

Career statistics
Competition	First-class
Matches	9
Runs scored	190
Batting average	13.57
100s/50s	0/0
Top score	41
Catches/stumpings	5/–
- Source: CricInfo, 27 February 2024

Gregory Martyn Aim (4 September 1933 – 1 April 2005) was a New Zealand cricketer who played nine first-class cricket matches for Otago and Wellington between the 1955–56 and 1962–63 seasons.

Aim was born in Wellington, and attended Nelson College from 1946 to 1947, and Otago Boys' High School from 1948 to 1951. He played in four first-class cricket matches for Otago―all during the 1955–56 season―and five for Wellington, four in 1960–61 and a single match in 1962–63.

As well as being a cricketer, Aim was active in sports and arts administration. He was at various times the CEO of the Hillary Commission, executive chairman of the Wellington City Opera Company, deputy chair of the New Zealand Opera Company, a member of the management committee of the New Zealand Portrait Gallery, and patron of the Victoria University Cricket Club. He was awarded the New Zealand 1990 Commemoration Medal.

Aim died in Wellington in 2005 aged 71. An obituary was published in that year's New Zealand Cricket Almanack.
