= William Angie Smith =

American Methodist bishop (1894–1974)

- Born: Elgin, Texas
- Died: Dallas, Texas
- Other names: Angie Smith, W. Angie Smith, and William A., Jr.
- Occupation: Methodist Episcopal minister & bishop
- Years active: 1922 - 1974

William Angie Smith (21 December 1894 – 1974) was a bishop of The Methodist Church and the United Methodist Church, elected in 1944.

== Birth and family ==
William was born 21 December 1894 in Elgin, Texas, the son of William Angie, Sr. and Mary (Marrs) Smith. William (Jr). Smith married Bess Owens 20 July 1920. They had children William Angie III, Bryant Wesley and Shelby Lee.

== Education ==
William (Jr) earned the A.B. degree from Southwestern University in 1917. He was a member of the Kappa Alpha Order. He then studied theology at the Southern Methodist University School of Religion (for one year), the Union Theological Seminary (for one year), and at the Vanderbilt School of Religion (for two years). William was also a member of the honorary fraternities Tau Kappa Alpha and Theta Phi. He then earned the M.A. degree from Columbia University in 1924.

== Ordained ministry ==
William Angie Smith entered the Texas Annual Conference of the Methodist Episcopal Church, South in 1921 and was appointed the pastor of the Kerrville, Texas M.E., S. Church, serving 1920–21. Subsequent appointments followed, including: Midland, Texas, 1921–23; Tulip St. Church, Nashville, 1924–26; Trinity Church, El Paso, 1926–30; First Methodist Church, Shreveport, Louisiana, 1930–34; Mt. Vernon Place Church, Washington, D.C., 1934–36; First Church, Birmingham, Alabama, 1936–38; and First Church, Dallas, 1938–44. Rev. Smith also served as Acting President of Centenary College of Louisiana, 1932–33.

Rev. Smith was a delegate to the Ecumenical Conference of 1931. He was elected a delegate from his Annual Conference to the General Conference of the M.E., S. Church in 1934 and 1938, and of The Methodist Church in 1944. He was a member of the South Central Jurisdictional Conference of The Methodist Church in 1940 and 1944. He was elected by the M.E., S. College of Bishops as a Fraternal Messenger of his denomination to the Methodist Protestant General Convention in 1936. Rev. Smith also was a clergy member of the Book Committee of the M.E., S. Church, 1934–39, and of the Board of Publication (and its executive committee) of The Methodist Church, 1939–44.

== Episcopal ministry ==
The Rev. Dr. William Angie Smith was elected to the episcopacy of The Methodist Church, 13 June 1944, by the South Central Jurisdictional Conference meeting at Tulsa, Oklahoma. He was assigned to the Oklahoma-New Mexico episcopal area of this denomination. His offices were at 224 N.W. 19th St., Oklahoma City, Oklahoma. Smith's. first assignment outside the United States was as Official Visitor to Latin America in 1944. Then he represented the Council of Bishops in India, Burma and Malaysia. Then he was made President of the General Commission on the structure of Methodism overseas, specifically charged with conferring with missionaries, local clergy, and national leaders in Europe, Asia, Taiwan and Japan. In 1957, he became President of the Council of Bishops of the Methodist Church. The highest position attainable by a Methodist clergyman.

== Honors ==
The Rev. William Angie Smith was awarded the honorary degree Doctor of Divinity in 1927 by McMurry College. Centenary College did the same (D.D., 1934). His alma mater, Southwestern University, followed suit in 1938 (D.D.). Smith has also served as a trustee of Southern Methodist University. He has also served as President of the Board of Trustees of Oklahoma City University, which named a chapel for him.

== See also ==
- List of bishops of the United Methodist Church
