= Jamie Moore =

Jamie Moore may refer to:

- Jamie Moore (boxer) (born 1978), English retired boxer
- Jamie Moore (jockey) (born 1985), English jockey
- Jamie Amihere Moore (born 1992), English footballer

== See also ==
- 117388 Jamiemoore, asteroid
- Jaime Halsey (née Moore; born 1979), British trampolinist
- James Moore (disambiguation)
