= First Methodist Church (Shreveport, Louisiana) =

Coordinates: 32.51053°N 93.75302°W

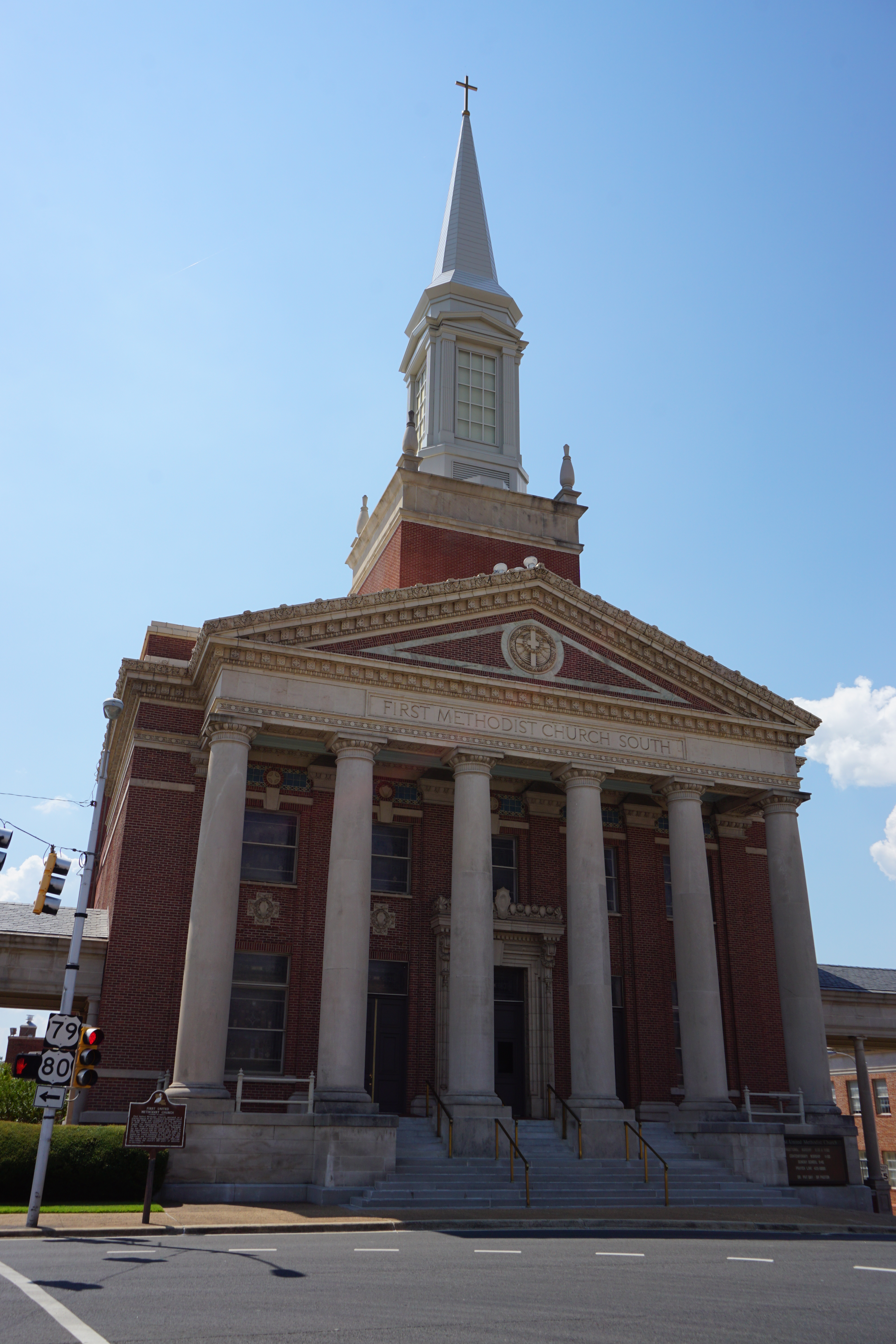
- First Methodist Church
- Location: Shreveport, Louisiana
- Country: United States
- Denomination: Global Methodist Church
- Previous denomination: United Methodist Church; Methodist Episcopal Church; Methodist Episcopal Church, South; The Methodist Church
- Website: firstshreveport.org

History
- Former name(s): Shreveport Methodist Church; First Methodist Church
- Founded: 1845; 181 years ago

Architecture
- Functional status: Active
- Style: Neoclassical
- Completed: 1913; 113 years ago

Clergy
- Pastor(s): Rev. Matthew Hulbert; Rev. Stephanie Kidd; Carmen Barrios; Ebi Barrios

First Methodist Church is a historic Methodist church in Shreveport, Louisiana, United States. Founded in 1845 as a congregation of the Methodist Episcopal Church, it moved to its current site in 1883 and built its current building in 1913. In the split in the denomination before the American Civil War, this congregation became a member of the Methodist Episcopal Church, South. It later affiliated with The Methodist Church, before joining the United Methodist Church in 1967. In 2023, it voted to leave the United Methodist Church. On July 9, 2023, it was announced, through the homepage of the church's website, that the congregation had voted by a 96% margin to affiliate with the Global Methodist Church.

Originally a small, frontier church serviced by circuit rider preachers, First United Methodist Church is today one of the largest in Shreveport. By the mid-20th century, it had 5,000 members. Today it has more than 1,000. The church has been led by notable clergy such as William Angie Smith, and James W. Moore. In addition, many notable people have been associated with the church, including state politicians such as William Pike Hall Sr., Lonnie O. Aulds, and Barrow Peacock.

== History ==
First Methodist was founded in the 1830s, when Shreveport was a small unincorporated frontier settlement. At first, the small congregation was called Shreveport Methodist Church, though it had no building. At the time, it was served mainly by circuit riders, Methodist ministers who made rounds between different congregations. In 1845, the Methodists, Presbyterians, and Baptists pooled together to construct a shared meeting house, the city's first religious building. Later, the church constructed its own building, and when it helped plant other Methodist churches in Shreveport, it changed its name to First Methodist Church to distinguish itself.

Founded as a congregation of the Methodist Episcopal Church, it became part of the Methodist Episcopal Church, South when they split from the former denomination in 1844, during tensions before the American Civil War over slavery. In 1939, the church became part of the Methodist Church (USA), a merged denomination of the northern and southern factions of the Methodist Episcopal Church. They later renamed as the United Methodist Church.

Since 1883, the congregation has been located at its current location at the head of Texas Street. The current church building was completed in 1913.

In 1955, D. L. Dykes Jr. accepted the offer to become pastor of First Methodist Church. He arrived with progressive views on race and theology that differed from some in his congregation. He defended the civil rights of African Americans, and was subjected to a Ku Klux Klan cross burning in front of his house while meeting with black leaders. One time, a man entered the church and threatened to shoot and kill him, but Dykes talked him out of it. When a black teenage girl who had been attending the church's youth group wished to join the church, youth director David Stone learned that the church was receiving $25,000 a year from a segregationist donor with the condition that no blacks could join. Stone brought the situation to Dykes' attention. The pastor welcomed the girl as a member and decided to look for funds elsewhere.

In the 1950s and 60s, when many urban churches were relocating to the growing suburbs, First Methodist Church decided to remain in downtown Shreveport. Dykes said in 1960: "I think every city needs a heart, a heart of religion. We chose to stay downtown and be that heart." In 1967, when the United Methodist Church was created, the church changed its name to reflect the new denomination. During this era, the church had a membership of 5,000 and a staff of 23, including clergy.

In 1955, Dykes became a televangelist when he started broadcasting his sermons and First Methodist Church services on the KSLA television channel, a CBS affiliate in Shreveport. In 1982, Dykes founded Alternate View Network, which included programming on religious, social, and political topics. After installing a satellite dish near the church, the program was sent to three hundred cable systems and could reach four million homes.

While some aspects of Dykes' pastorship were well received, like the expansion of the church's media footprint, his theological views were more controversial. During the 1950s and early 1960s, he faced criticism from more conservative members of the church. In a video series released in 2000 examining his theological views, Dykes is quoted as saying that Jesus "did not see himself as the Son of God; he didn't see himself as anything special." He was also quoted as saying that the Trinity was unimportant and that God does not punish or reward. Marcus Borg later examined Dykes' beliefs as shown in the video series.

Dykes retired from First United Methodist Church in 1984, after nearly 30 years as pastor. For the past twelve years, James W. Moore had been his co-pastor. Dykes and Moore were succeeded by John E. Fellers, a Texas native, who remained pastor until 1992.

The mid-20th-century was a period of physical expansion for First United Methodist Church. In 1940, the Dawson Building was added to the church campus. In 1964, the Hunter and Couch buildings were added, which flank the main sanctuary and are connected by colonnades. In 1983, the AVN Television and Performing Arts Center was completed. In 1972, a neoclassical steeple was added to the building.

In October 2009, the church steeple was toppled during a violent storm. It fell on the car, and the man inside was critically injured. In May 2012, construction began on the replacement steeple. Today, the church has a membership of 3,831, down from 5,000 in the mid-20th century.

== Architecture ==
First Methodist Church is a neoclassical edifice, erected in 1913. It is a brick structure, with a front façade containing a portico with six stone columns. Engraved above the columns are the words "First Methodist Church, South" - at the time of its construction, the church was a member of the Methodist Episcopal Church, South. The main building is flanked by two side buildings completed in 1964, which are connected to the sanctuary by colonnades. In 1972, the neoclassical steeple was added to the building. The steeple was destroyed in 2009 in a storm and replaced in 2012.

== Notable people ==
=== Clergy ===
- Samuel Armstead (1804–1908), was the church's minister to slaves during the mid-19th-century, and went on to become a Louisiana State Representative and later Secretary of State of Louisiana
- William Angie Smith (1894–1974), pastor from 1930–1934, went on to be elected bishop of The Methodist Church and the United Methodist Church
- D. L. Dykes Jr. (1917–1997), pastor from 1955–1984
- August Aamodt (1930-2002), youth minister from 1963-1967, went on to be a dean at Centenary College of Louisiana
- James W. Moore, co-pastor from 1972–84, went on to become a writer

=== Members ===
- Peter Youree (1843–1914), businessman and banker
- William Pike Hall Sr. (1896–1945), lawyer and Democratic Louisiana State Senator
- Rupert Peyton (1899–1982), journalist, historian, and Democratic Louisiana State Representative
- Keith M. Pyburn (1910–1967), lawyer and Democratic Louisiana State Representative
- Charles E. Roemer II (1923–2012), farmer, businessman, and political operative
- Lonnie O. Aulds (1925–1984), businessman and Democratic Louisiana State Representative
- Charles B. Peatross (1940–2015), lawyer, politician, and judge
- Barrow Peacock (born 1970), businessman and Republican Louisiana State Senator
- LaLeshia Walker, lawyer and former judge, married at the church in 1994
