= James Moor =

James Moor may refer to:

- James Moor (classicist) (1712–1779), Scottish classical scholar
- James H. Moor (1942–2024), American philosopher

== See also ==
- James Moore (disambiguation)
