= United States v. Moore (1988) =

1988 Eighth Circuit Court of Appeals case

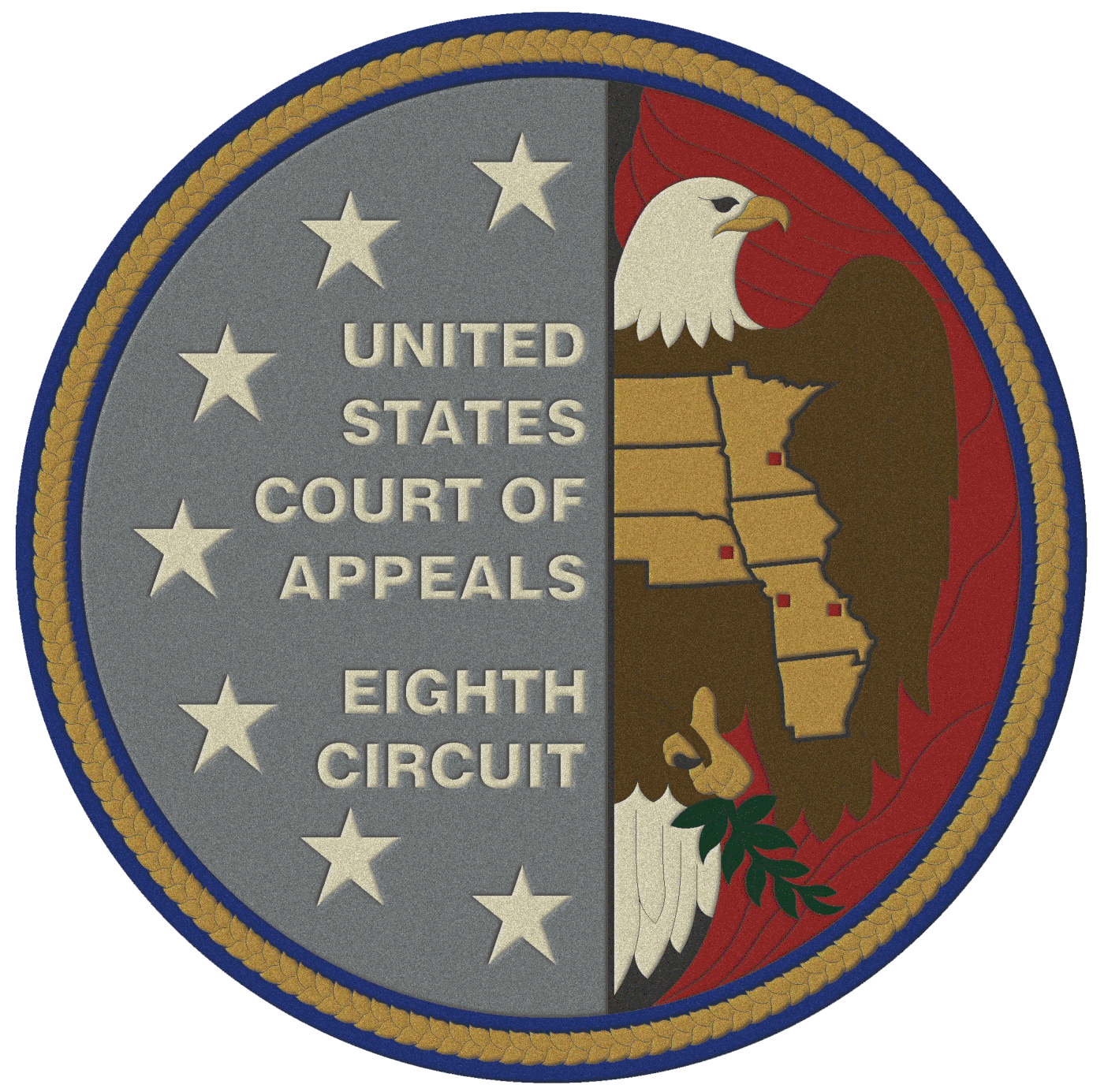
- Court: United States Court of Appeals for the Eighth Circuit
- Full case name: United States v. James Vernell Moore
- Submitted: April 13, 1988
- Decided: May 24, 1988
- Citation: 846 F.2d 1163

Case history
- Prior actions: judgment for defendant, 669 F. Supp. 289 (D. Minn. 1987)
- Appealed from: United States District Court for the District of Minnesota

Court membership
- Judges sitting: Richard S. Arnold; Donald Roe Ross; William H. Timbers (sitting by designation)

Case opinions
- Majority: Timbers, joined by unanimous

United States v. Moore, 846 F.2d 1163 (8th Cir. 1988), was a decision of the United States Court of Appeals for the Eighth Circuit to uphold the conviction of James Vernell Moore for assault with a deadly weapon.

== References and further reading ==
- Stansbury, Carlton D. (1989). "Deadly and dangerous weapons and AIDS: the Moore analysis is likely to be dangerous". Iowa Law Review. 74 (4): 951–968.
- Stauter, Robert Louis (1989). "United States v. Moore: AIDS and the criminal law – the witch hunt begins". Akron Law Review. 22 (4): 503–524.
- Costa, Vincent J. (2013). "Armed to the teeth: The use of a person's mouth, teeth or body as a dangerous instrument for aggravated offenses". Touro Law Review. 29 (4): 925–948.
