= John Burt (rugby union) =

NZ international rugby union player & cricketer

- Born: John Robert Burt; 27 August 1874 Dunedin, New Zealand
- Died: 16 January 1933 (aged 58) Christchurch, New Zealand
- School: Otago Boys' High School
- University: Canterbury Agricultural College
- Occupation: Company manager

Rugby union career
- Position: Loose forward
Provincial / State sides
Years	Team	Apps	(Points)
1896–1901	Otago	11	
International career
Years	Team	Apps	(Points)
1901	New Zealand	0	(0)
- Cricket career

Cricket information
- Role: Batsman

Domestic team information
- Years: Team
- 1901/02–1908/09: Otago
- FC debut: 26 December 1901 Otago v Canterbury
- Last FC: 5 January 1909 Otago v Hawke's Bay

Career statistics
Competition	First-class
Matches	3
Runs scored	72
Batting average	18.00
100s/50s	0/0
Top score	27
Catches/stumpings	2/–
- Source: CricketArchive, 27 February 2024

John Robert Burt (27 August 1874 – 16 January 1933) was a New Zealand rugby union player, cricketer and businessman. He played one match for the New Zealand national rugby union team, made three first-class appearances for the Otago cricket team, and was a branch manager of the engineering firm, A. & T. Burt Ltd, founded by his father.

== Early life and family ==
Burt was born in Dunedin on 27 August 1874, the son of Janet Burt (née Crawford) and her husband Alexander Burt, one of the founders of the engineering firm A. & T. Burt Ltd. Educated at Otago Boys' High School, he then studied at Canterbury Agricultural College and worked for a time in farming. On 23 June 1910, Burt married Elizabeth Rutherford Snow at Outram. They went on to have two daughters.

== Rugby union ==
A rugby union loose forward, Burt represented Otago at a provincial level, playing 11 matches for the side between 1896 and 1901. He played just one match for the New Zealand national side, against Wellington in 1901.

== Cricket ==
Burt made three first-class appearances for the Otago cricket team: two in the 1901–02 season and one in the 1908–09 season. A batsman, Burt opened the innings for Otago twice in his four times at bat. He scored 72 runs, with a high score of 27, at an average of 18.00, and took two catches.

== Business career ==
After leaving farming, Burt initially worked for A. & T. Burt in Dunedin. He was manager of the firm's Wellington branch from 1908 to 1912, and represented the company in London from 1912 to 1920. Returning to New Zealand, he was manager of A. & T. Burt's Christchurch branch until his retirement in 1932.

== Death ==
Burt died in Christchurch on 16 January 1933, and was survived by his wife and their daughters. He was buried at Dunedin Northern Cemetery in the same plot as his parents.
