= Calasanctius Howley =

New Zealand Catholic nun and teacher

Calasanctius Howley (17 June 1848–13 December 1933) was a New Zealand catholic nun and teacher. She was born in Corofin, County Clare, Ireland on 17 June 1848.
