= George Humphreys (rugby union) =

- Born: George William Humphreys; 15 March 1870 Wolverhampton, England
- Died: 11 May 1933 (aged 63) Rotorua, New Zealand
- Occupation: Farmer

Rugby union career
- Position: Loose forward
Amateur team(s)
Years	Team	Apps	(Points)
1890–92, 94–96	Christchurch		
Provincial / State sides
Years	Team	Apps	(Points)
1891–92, 94	Canterbury	9	
International career
Years	Team	Apps	(Points)
1894	New Zealand	1	(3)

George William Humphreys (15 March 1870 – 11 May 1933) was an English-born New Zealand rugby union player who represented the All Blacks in 1894. His position of choice was loose forward. Humphreys did not play in any test matches as New Zealand did not play their first until 1903.

Humphreys was born in Wolverhampton, England and moved to New Zealand at the age of 17.

He died in Rotorua in 1933.

== Career ==
Humphreys played nine games for theCanterbury province between 1891 and 1894.

He played in Canterbury's match against the touring NSW side.

Based on his performances he was then selected for the national team in their match against the tourists which was conveniently played in Christchurch. Humphreys scored a try, however the match was lost 8-6.

He may have played again in 1897 but this is far from certain.

== Farming ==
Humphreys purchased Willencote, a farm located in Gisborne in 1918. His acquisition contained 1,827 acres of land. In 1923 the ownership was then handed to his son, Frank. The farm is currently owned and operated by the 4th generation of the Humphreys family. The farm size is now smaller, being 1,040 acres.

== Family ==
His son, Frank "Fred" Edwin Humphreys representedPoverty Bay between 1919 and 1920.
