= James L. Moore III =

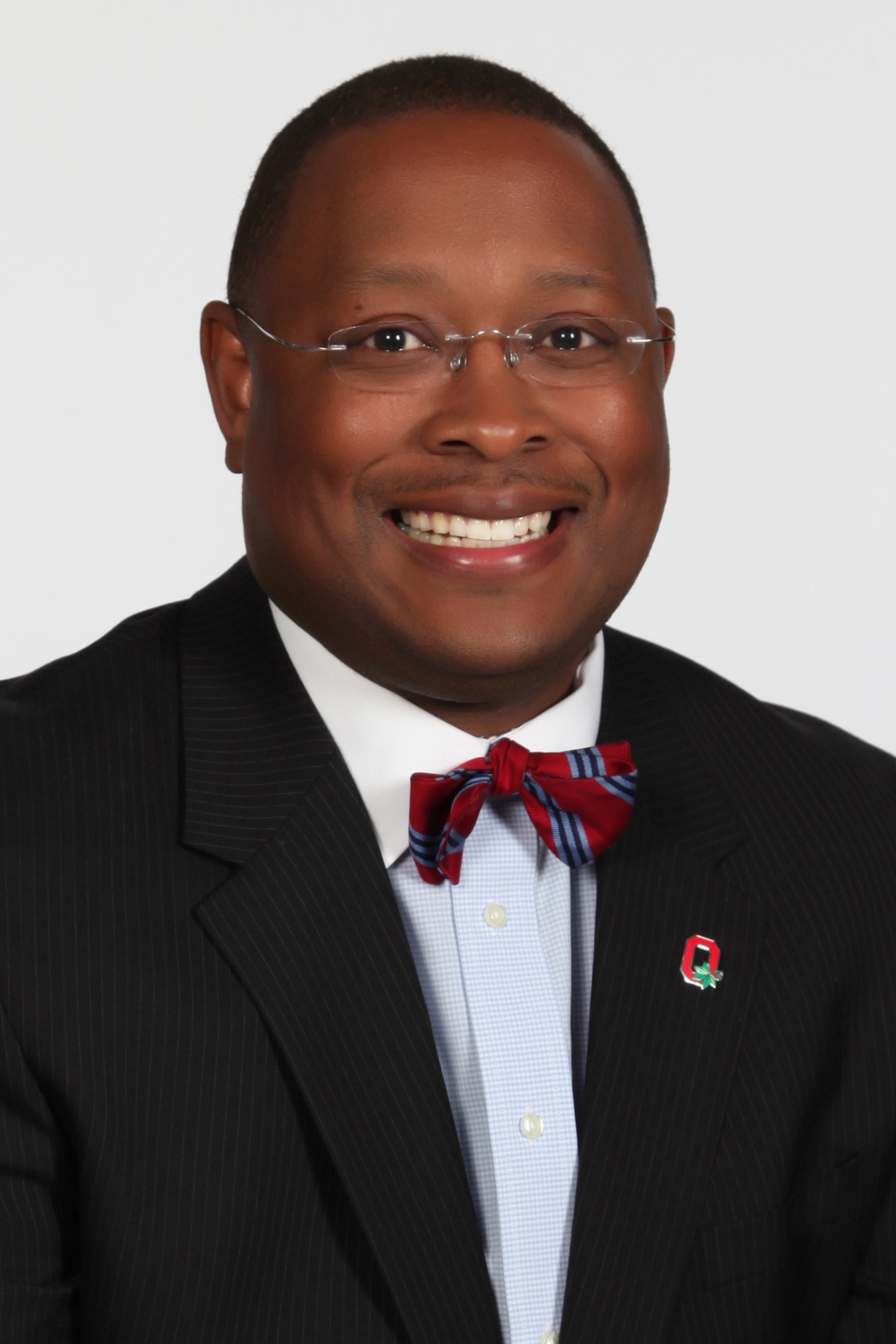
- James L. Moore III
- Born: South Carolina, United States
- Education: Delaware State University, Virginia Tech
- Scientific career
- Fields: Education
- Workplaces: Ohio State University

James L. Moore III is the Vice Provost for Diversity and Inclusion and Chief Diversity Officer of The Ohio State University. He also serves as executive director of the Todd Anthony Bell National Resource Center on the African American Male and is the inaugural College of Education and Human Ecology Distinguished Professor of Urban Education. Moore co-founded the International Colloquium on Black Males in Education. From 2015 to 2017, Moore served as the rotating program director for Broadening Participation in Engineering in the Engineering directorate at the National Science Foundation in Arlington, Virginia. In 2018 the Dr. James L. Moore III Scholars Program, established by Missy and Bob Weiler, was created to support undergraduate students transferring from Columbus State Community College to Ohio State University.

== Education ==
Moore received his B.A. in English Education from Delaware State University (1995), and earned his M.A.Ed (1997) and PhD (2000) in Counselor Education from Virginia Tech.

== Research ==
Moore's research agenda is divided into four strands:

1. Studying how educational professionals, such as school counselors, influence the educational and career aspirations and school experiences of students of color (particularly African American males)
2. Exploring socio-cultural, familial, school, and community factors that support, enhance and impede academic outcomes for K-12 African American students
3. Examining recruitment and retention issues of students of color in gifted education and college students in science, technology, engineering, and mathematics
4. Exploring social, emotional, and psychological consequences of racial oppression of African American males and other people of color in education, counseling, workplace, and athletics.

== Selected publications ==
- Vega, D., Moore, J.L. III, Miranda, A.(2015) "I'm going to prove you wrong": Responses to perceived discrimination among African American youth. Journal for Multicultural Education, 9(4),210 - 224.
- Flowers, L. A., Moore, J.L. III, Flowers, L. O., & Flowers, T. A. (2015). Assessing Organizational Culture and Engaging Faculty Diversity in Higher Education. Positive Organizing in a Global Society: Understanding and Engaging Differences for Capacity Building and Inclusion, 163.
- West, S. C., & Moore, J.L. III (2015). Council for Accreditation of Counseling and Related Educational Programs at Historically Black Colleges and Universities (HBCUs). The Journal of Negro Education, 84(1), 56–65.
- Mayes, R.D., & Moore, J.L. III (2016) Adversity and pitfalls of twice exceptional urban learners. Journal of Advanced Academics, 27(3), 167–189.
- Faulk, D., Bennett, R.A., & Moore, J.L. III. (2017). Gamed by the system: Exploring Black male youth's motivation to participate in sports. Boyhood Studies, 10(10), 88–100.

== Recent edited books ==
- Moore, J.L. III, & Lewis, C.W. (Eds.). African American students in Urban Schools: Critical Issues and Solutions for Achievement (Second Edition). New York: Peter Lang Publishers.
- Flowers, L.A., Flowers L.O., & Moore, J.L. III (Eds.). (2016). Advancing Educational Outcomes in Science, Technology, Engineering, and Mathematics at Historically Black Colleges and Universities. Lanham: Rowman & Littlefield.
- Dawson Lewis, J., & Moore, J.L. III. (Eds.) (2016). Gifted Children of Color Around the World: Diverse Needs, Exemplary Practices and Directions for the Future. Bingley: Emerald Group Publishing Limited.
- Bennett, R.A. III, Moore, J.L. III, Graham, D.L., Hodge, S.R. (Eds.) (2015). Black Males and Intercollegiate Athletics: An Exploration of Problems and Solutions. Bingley: Emerald Group Publishing Limited.
- Moore, J.L. III, & Lewis, C. W. (Eds.). (2014). African American Male Students in Pre K-12 Schools: Informing Research, Policy, and Practice. Bingley: Emerald Group Publishing Limited.

== Awards ==
- National Association for Gifted Children, Presidential Appointment
- American Educational Research Association Distinguished Scholar in Counseling (2008)
- National Association for Gifted Children Early Scholar Award (2008)
- Carl Grant Multicultural Research Award (2009)
- Black Man Can Award for Higher Education (2012)
- American College Personnel Association SCMM Outstanding Research Award (2013)
- American Council on Education Fellow (2014)
- Ohio School Counselor Association's Counselor Educator of the Year Award (2015)
- American Educational Research Association Distinguished Contributions to Gender Equity in Education Research Award (2016)
- American Educational Research Association Multicultural/Multi-ethnic Education Special Interest Group's Dr. Carlos J. Vallejo Memorial Award for Lifetime Scholarship (2017)
- American Educational Research Association Scholars of Color Mid-Career Contribution Award (2017)
- South Carolina Department of Education African-American Heritage Calendar Honoree (2018)
