= SS James Bennett Moore =

World War II Liberty ship of the United States

History

United States
- Name: James Bennett Moore
- Namesake: James Bennett Moore
- Ordered: as type (EC2-S-C1) hull, MC hull 2397
- Builder: J.A. Jones Construction, Brunswick, Georgia
- Cost: $797,094
- Yard number: 182
- Way number: 6
- Laid down: 15 December 1944
- Launched: 19 January 1945
- Sponsored by: Mary Peavey
- Completed: 31 January 1945
- Identification: Call Signal: ANHZ
- Fate: Laid up in the National Defense Reserve Fleet, Hudson River Group, 6 May 1948; Laid up in the National Defense Reserve Fleet, Mobile, Alabama, 2 June 1952; Sold for scrapping, 12 March 1971

General characteristics
- Class & type: Liberty ship; type EC2-S-C1, standard
- Tonnage: 10,865 LT DWT; 7,176 GRT
- Displacement: 3,380 long tons (3,434 t) (light); 14,245 long tons (14,474 t) (max)
- Length: 441 feet 6 inches (135 m) oa; 416 feet (127 m) pp; 427 feet (130 m) lwl
- Beam: 57 feet (17 m)
- Draft: 27 ft 9.25 in (8.4646 m)
- Installed power: 2 × Oil fired 450 °F (232 °C) boilers, operating at 220 psi (1,500 kPa); 2,500 hp (1,900 kW)
- Propulsion: 1 × triple-expansion steam engine, (manufactured by General Machinery Corp., Hamilton, Ohio); 1 × screw propeller
- Speed: 11.5 knots (21.3 km/h; 13.2 mph)
- Capacity: 562,608 cubic feet (15,931 m^{3}) (grain); 499,573 cubic feet (14,146 m^{3}) (bale)
- Complement: 38–62 USMM; 21–40 USNAG
- Armament: Varied by ship; Bow-mounted 3-inch (76 mm)/50-caliber gun; Stern-mounted 4-inch (102 mm)/50-caliber gun; 2–8 × single 20-millimeter (0.79 in) Oerlikon anti-aircraft (AA) cannons and/or, 2–8 × 37-millimeter (1.46 in) M1 AA guns

SS James Bennett Moore was a Liberty ship built in the United States during World War II. She was named after James Bennett Moore, who was lost at sea while he was the 2nd assistant engineer on the freighter SS Massmar, after the convoy (QP 13) she was travelling in strayed into an Allied minefield (SN72) 5 July 1942, off Greenland.

== Construction ==
James Bennett Moore was laid down on 15 December 1944, under a Maritime Commission (MARCOM) contract, MC hull 2397, by J.A. Jones Construction, Brunswick, Georgia; she was sponsored by Mary Peavey, daughter of Senator John Thomas of Idaho, and launched on 19 January 1945.

== History ==
She was allocated to the A.L. Burbank & Co., Ltd., on 31 January 1945. On 6 May 1948, she was laid up in the National Defense Reserve Fleet, in the Hudson River Group. On 10 October 1949, she was withdrawn from the fleet to be loaded with grain, she returned loaded on 19 October 1949. On 17 August 1950, she was withdrawn to be unload and refilled, she returned on 1 September 1950, reloaded. On 14 March 1951, she withdrew again to be unloaded but it is unclear when she returned, her status card refers to her being sent for repairs on 29 March 1951, and her being transferred to the Mobile Reserve Fleet on 2 June 1952. On 12 March 1971, she was sold to Union Minerals & Alloys, for scrapping. She was removed from the fleet on 14 June 1971.

== Bibliography ==
- Colton, Tim (13 October 2010). "Jones Construction, Brunswick GA". Shipbuilding History: Construction records of U.S. and Canadian shipbuilders and boatbuilders.
- Davies, James (May 2004). "Specifications (As-Built)" (PDF). ‘Liberty’ Cargo Ship. p. 23.
- "Liberty Ships – World War II".
- Maritime Administration. "James Bennett Moore". Ship History Database Vessel Status Card. U.S. Department of Transportation, Maritime Administration. Archived from the original on 12 December 2019.
- Maritime Commission. "James Bennett Moore". United States Maritime Commission: 1936 thru 1950.
