= Mary McCarthy (screenwriter) =

American screenwriter

- Born: San Francisco, California, US
- Occupations: Screenwriter, activist
- Years active: 1935–1957
- Political party: Democratic

Mary McCarthy (not to be confused with another screenwriter—Mary Eunice McCarthy) was an American screenwriter active in the 1930s and 1940s.

== Biography ==
Born and raised in San Francisco, California, to Irish parents (just like the similarly named screenwriter), McCarthy pursued a career as a schoolteacher in San Mateo, California, before giving it all up to run a nonprofit sandwich stand. She then became a political activist, stumping the state for the Democratic Party and going toe-to-toe with the Ku Klux Klan. Eventually she headed to Hollywood to pursue a career as a scenarist in the mid-1930s; her first big credit was on Theodora Goes Wild, a 1936 comedy starring Irene Dunne.

== Selected filmography ==
- Life Returns (1935)
- Theodora Goes Wild (1936)
- Amateur Detective (1939)
- Sister Kenny (1946)
- Curley (1947)
