= Charles E. Roemer II =

American politician (1923-2012)

Louisiana Commissioner of Administration
- In office 1972–1980
- Preceded by: W. W. McDougall
- Succeeded by: Bubba Henry

Personal details
- Born: Charles Elson Roemer II; December 11, 1923 Bossier Parish, Louisiana, US
- Died: July 7, 2012 (aged 88) Bossier Parish, Louisiana, US
- Resting place: Forest Park Cemetery in Shreveport, Louisiana
- Party: Democratic
- Spouse: Adeline McDade Roemer (m. 1942)
- Children: 5, including Buddy
- Education: Louisiana Tech University; Louisiana State University
- Occupation: Farmer; businessman

Military service
- Branch/service: United States Army Air Corps
- Battles/wars: World War II

Charles Elson Roemer II, also known as Charlie Roemer or Budgie Roemer (December 11, 1923 – July 7, 2012), was a farmer and businessman from Bossier City in northwestern Louisiana, who served as the commissioner of administration from 1972 to 1980 in the first two terms of Governor Edwin Washington Edwards. He was the father of Charles Elson "Buddy" Roemer III, who served as governor from 1988 to 1992, between the third and fourth Edwards terms.

== Background ==
Roemer was a son of Charles Elson Roemer, known as Pete Roemer, and the former Maggie Crocker. After his father's death, he was reared on a farm by his stepfather and mother, Vernon and Maggie Mayer. During World War II, he volunteered for the United States Army Air Forces, forerunner of the United States Air Force. Thereafter, he attended Louisiana Tech University in Ruston and then graduated Phi Beta Kappa from Louisiana State University in Baton Rouge. While attending LSU, he worked as a welder at the nearby Exxon refinery. He married his high school sweetheart, the former Juliet Adeline McDade, who was two weeks his junior. A native of McDade in Bossier Parish, she survived her husband after seventy years of marriage. Adeline, as she was known, was a daughter of Ross Elias McDade Sr. and McDade's second wife, the former Ethel Earle Elston. Coincidentally, Roemer's middle name, Elson, is one letter short of his mother-in-law's maiden name, Elston.

Charles and Adeline Roemer worked as a team on the farm. They introduced in conjunction with the LSU Red River Valley Experiment Station, Stardel cotton at their Scopena Plantation in Bossier Parish south of Bossier City. They cultivated hybrid seed corn, owned an International Harvester equipment dealership, and owned and operated two cotton gins. In addition to cotton and corn, Roemer grew soybeans, sunflowers, tomatoes, geese, and cattle. The Roemers owned a dozen airplanes, most used for crop dusting, and Roemer was himself a licensed pilot. The Roemers worked to organize Rural Electrification Administration cooperatives in both Louisiana and Texas. When Roemer was injured in an airplane accident in the early 1950s, Adeline took over management of Scopena. Thereafter, she continued to run the cotton gin and handled most of the agri-business accounts. A staunch Democrat, she was active in various social and civic causes over the years.

Jack Dillard, a long-term Shreveport farm reporter, described the senior Roemer as a personal mentor who taught him much about agriculture:

Mr. Roemer invited me to state and national agriculture sessions and meetings where we had front-row seats. I knew very little about the cotton business but learned a lot from him. He could go to Baton Rouge and back faster than anyone I know. He talked as we traveled and introduced me to the leadership at that time. The National Cotton Council was as close as the phone. His love for Scopena Plantation and Stardel Cotton was always in his thoughts. When he shifted into politics, our travels slowed; but he always had time to talk or give a tip on upcoming activities.

== Political activities ==
By the 1960s, Roemer had become politically involved. On January 31, 1961, U.S. Representative Overton Brooks of Louisiana's 4th congressional district, based about Shreveport, voted with a narrow majority of 217–212 to increase the size of the House Rules Committee to permit Speaker Sam Rayburn of Texas to appoint newer, members to the panel, which determines the legislation brought to the House floor. Conservatives in both parties generally opposed this vote, which they termed "packing the Rules Committee." Because of this vote, Joe Waggonner of Bossier Parish announced that he would challenge Brooks in the August 1962 Democratic primary. Roemer was among the organizers of a civic group known as the Congressional Affairs League of Louisiana, created to express a vote of "No Confidence" in Representative Brooks. Brooks died in 1961, and Waggonner won a special election for the seat by defeating the Republican nominee, Charlton Lyons of Shreveport.

Within a decade, however, Roemer became an advocate of civil rights for African Americans, a position which led him to support then U.S. Representative Edwin Edwards of Crowley in south Louisiana for governor in the 1971 Democratic primary though a state senator from Shreveport, J. Bennett Johnston Jr., was Edwards' principal rival for the party nomination and subsequently a long-term U.S. senator. After he narrowly defeated Johnston, Edwards then faced a determined challenge from Republican David C. Treen. Roemer frequently invited black leaders to Scopena Plantation to discuss politics and chart a course of action at election time. He managed Edwards' first gubernatorial campaign from headquarters in the Hotel Monteleone in downtown New Orleans. He made use of relatively new computer software through his company, Innovative Data Systems, to gauge the importance of various political issues and to enhance get-out-the-vote activities, using telegrams to targeted voters. According to his obituary published in major Louisiana newspapers, Roemer as Edwards' first commissioner of administration promised "to bring the management and operations of state government into better focus and discipline ... though he was at times controversial, he was known to be swift and fair in his management decisions."

== FBI Sting Operation Brilab ==
In 1981, a year after the second Edwards administration ended, Roemer and four others, including Carlos Marcello, the boss of the New Orleans crime family; Aubrey W. Young, a key administration figure during the administration of Governor John J. McKeithen; New Orleans attorney Vincent A. Mannello, and lobbyist I. Irving Davidson were charged in U.S. District Court in New Orleans with conspiracy, racketeering, and mail and wire fraud in a scheme to bribe state officials to give the five men multimillion-dollar insurance contracts. The charges were the result of a Federal Bureau of Investigation (FBI) probe known as BriLab.

U.S. District Judge Morey Sear allowed the admission of secretly-recorded conversations that demonstrated corruption at the highest levels of state government. Young was acquitted of all charges.

Roemer was thereafter convicted of one count of conspiracy and imprisoned. He was released some three years later in October 1984. Marcello was convicted of conspiracy and then indicted on additional charges involving an alleged attempt to bribe the judge. Marcello was finally released from prison in October 1989, after he had served for fifteen months. Irving Davidson claimed that federal agents had used threats and offers of immunity to convict Marcello. The Bureau of Prisons does not indicate that Davidson or Mannello ever served time.

The FBI agents posed as crooked insurance executives and engaged in a sting operation against Roemer and his co-defendants. According to the prosecution, Roemer and Marcello were expecting to share a monthly commission of $387,000. The United States Court of Appeals for the Fifth Circuit in New Orleans upheld the guilty verdicts, but the court changed its mind in 1989, when it declared that the convictions could no longer stand because the statute on which the convictions were based had been altered by the United States Supreme Court. The prosecution said that Roemer and Marcello had conspired to deprive citizens of honest government. In the 1989 appeal, the defense team cited the Supreme Court opinion that the particular law was intended to protect money or property rights, not to defend the "intangible" right to good government. "I was worth $12 million or $15 million, and I took bankruptcy. ... Four million dollars went in expenses for the trial and preparation, and I lost ten years of my life," Roemer said at the time of the reversal of his conviction even after he had served time in the penitentiary.

In July 1992, Roemer and his younger son, Franklin Daniel "Danny" Roemer (born 1946), like his brother a graduate of Harvard University, and R. Lee Harvill, a developer from Benton, the seat of government of Bossier Parish, were indicted by a federal grand jury on conspiracy and bank fraud charges stemming from a loan involving a real estate deal in Bossier Parish. The charges stemmed from an 18-month probe by the FBI and federal prosecutors.

The senior Roemer and Harvill were acquitted, but Danny Roemer was convicted of bank fraud in the U.S. District Court. He was sentenced to two years of imprisonment, a $20,000 fine, and restitution of $2,421,591 plus interest. He appealed unsuccessfully to the U.S. appeals court in New Orleans to reverse his conviction. On February 9, 1995, Danny Roemer was released from the Bureau of Prisons.

== Family and death ==
Adeline Roemer gave her husband the nickname "Budgie," referring to a small bird, not to budget decisions that he made as commissioner of administration. In addition to sons, Buddy Roemer and his third wife, Scarlett, and Danny Roemer and wife Judy, Charles Roemer had three daughters, Margaret (nickname: "Punkin") Roemer Lefler, the widow of Randal Harland Lefler; Melinda Roemer Barrett and husband Michael, and Melanie Roemer Melville and husband David; seventeen grandchildren; and thirty-six great-grandchildren. Roemer's sister, Margaret "Peggy" Roemer Read (1919–2010) of New Orleans, was the founder of the Friends of City Park and worked in the revitalization of the New Orleans Botanical Garden. Her surviving husband and Roemer's brother-in-law is Henry James Read.

Roemer died in his sleep at Scopena Plantation at the age of eighty-eight after a ten-year struggle with Alzheimer's disease. Services were held on July 10, 2012, at the First United Methodist Church in downtown Shreveport, with officiating ministers Michael Barrett, Carl Rhoads, and Roemer's son-in-law, David R. Melville, pastor of the Fellowship United Methodist Church of Bossier City. Melville was the unsuccessful Democratic nominee for Louisiana's 4th congressional district seat in the 2010 general election, having been defeated by the Republican incumbent John C. Fleming of Minden. This same congressional seat was held by Buddy Roemer from 1981 to 1988 and unsuccessfully sought by Adeline Roemer in 1988, who was defeated by the then freshman incumbent Republican Jim McCrery, a former aide to Buddy Roemer. McCrery held the House seat until his retirement in January 2009, when he was succeeded by Fleming, who vacated the position to run for the United States Senate in 2016.

Nine grandsons served as pallbearers. Grandson Chas Roemer, son of Buddy Roemer and first wife, the former Frances "Cookie" Demler, later Cookie Thomas, is an elected Republican member of the Louisiana Board of Elementary and Secondary Education. Former Governor Edwin Edwards, an honorary pallbearer, described Roemer as "a very honorable man, very efficient. He was very ambitious, but that was not a bad quality ... He was ambitious for the good things." State Senate President John Alario, a Democrat-turned-Republican from Westwego in Jefferson Parish, who was a Democratic floor leader for Edwards, recalls Roemer as a skilled budget tactician: "He was someone who made sure we had a balanced budget. He always had the best interest of the state in mind."

Roemer is interred beside his wife, who died early in 2016, at Forest Park Cemetery in Shreveport.
