= Bill McEwan =

Canadian businessman

William G. McEwan is a former president, chief executive officer and director of Sobeys Inc., the second largest Canadian grocery retailer and food distributor.

A native of Trail, British Columbia, at 15, McEwan had a part-time job bagging groceries at a local store; he liked it so much that after a year-and-a-half at the University of British Columbia in Vancouver, he returned to the business full-time.

McEwan spent more than 30 years in the grocery retailing and consumer packaged goods industries, with Ferraro's Ltd. (Super Valu), Coca-Cola (where he was vice president market development, Coca-Cola Beverages Ltd.) and The Great Atlantic & Pacific Tea Company (A&P). At A&P, McEwan was senior vice president of grocery and non-food merchandising for the company's Canadian operations, before being appointed president and chief merchandising officer in 1996. He was later appointed president and CEO of the company's U.S. Atlantic Region.

McEwan joined Sobeys in November 2000 as president and CEO, was also on the board of directors for CIES - The Food Business Forum, and is a past chairman of the Grocery Industry Foundation Together (GIFT) in Canada.

McEwan retired from his role at Sobeys in 2012.

In November 2005, McEwan was presented the Golden Pencil Award, The Food Industry Association of Canada's highest distinction.

Bill McEwan was a long term supervisory board member and Vice Chair of Ahold Delhaize. In 2019, McEwan was appointed chair of Aimia (company).

Bill resides with his wife Donna at their Farm property in Meaford, Ontario.
