= John Lomas (RAF officer) =

Decoder and civil servant

John Lomas (1920–2019) was an RAF intelligence officer during the Second World War, when he decoded German communications at Bletchley Park. After the war, he became a senior officer in the Immigration Service.
