= Frank Milne (mountaineer) =

New Zealand mountaineer and guide

Francis Middleton Milne (11 December 1891 – 9 January 1933) was a notable New Zealand mountaineer and guide. He was born in Taieri Beach, South Otago, New Zealand on 11 December 1891.
