= Robin M. Startup =

New Zealand philatelist (1933–2012)

Robin McGill Startup (22 July 1933 – 16 February 2012) was a New Zealand philatelist who signed the Roll of Distinguished Philatelists in 2008.
