= Barry Smith (preacher) =

- Born: Barry Rumsey Smith; 10 May 1933; New Zealand
- Died: 27 June 2002 (aged 69); Worcester, England, UK
- Occupations: Preacher, Prophet, author
- Title: Pastor Barry Smith
- Partner: May Smith
- Website: http://www.barrysmith.org.nz/

Barry Rumsey Smith (10 May 1933 – 27 June 2002) was a Christian preacher and author from New Zealand. Smith travelled extensively preaching throughout the Pacific, Australia, New Zealand, the United Kingdom and around the world. He wrote eight books with the theme of end times prophecy. His writings also appeared in his monthly newspaper Omega Times.

== Biography ==
Barry Smith was a school teacher and had taught in New Zealand and the Pacific Islands. He left his employment to lecture on end time events and the lead up to the new world order. While in Western Samoa, he met May, a young Samoan woman who was to become his wife.

Smith was highly concerned about the New World Order, One World Government and the Mark of the Beast, which he believed would be achieved through some form of modern technology such as barcode tattoos, or a subcutaneous chip used to replace money, such as those currently being sold by VeriChip. He stated that he was not a prophet (more precisely that he had no supernatural prescient knowledge of further events) but that his analysis of global situations coupled with his understanding of biblical end-times prophecy led him to make predictions concerning near-future global events.

For Barry Smith, a one world government would be satanic and evil, a belief taken from his study of biblical prophecy.

He was strongly Anti-Masonic. He talked about the detail of the "great seal" on the US$1 bill, linking the symbolism to Freemasonry, and the layout of certain landmark buildings in Washington DC in which he claimed could be found the Masonic square and compass, and the inverted pentagram.

=== Beliefs ===
Smith wrote several books (see details below) and gave regular public addresses, usually to audiences at churches both in major cities and small towns all around the world. His themes were principally Christian eschatology, conspiracy theory and a Christian evangelical message encouraging his audiences to accept Jesus Christ as their Saviour.

Many bold claims were made by Smith, both in his books and at his public meetings which were controversial. He preached and lectured using many anecdotes, many of which were not easy to independently verify. Frequently it was not clear through how many intermediaries a story had passed before reaching him and his audience.

Smith was a proponent of the 9/11 conspiracy theories, claiming that the 11 September attacks were orchestrated by the US federal government.

== Australia and New Zealand ==
Barry Smith had given numerous talks in both Australia and New Zealand. He claimed that both countries were test cases in the new world order. In one of his documentaries, Back Door to the New World Order he said that the Elite had chosen New Zealand to be the first test in their new world order plan, and what had begun in Europe with the secret societies had "finally burst into bud" in New Zealand.

== Microchipping and RFID tracking ==
=== International ===
In an interview published in Challenge Weekly, a New Zealand Christian newspaper, Smith commented on the collapse of the world economy and that the mark of the beast was already being advertised around the world. His belief was that it was a tiny electronic radio frequency chip that was placed under the skin. He said that animals were being chipped and that there were plans to put them on humans.

== Interviews ==
- Barry Smith put under fire by Philip Powell
- End Time Prophecy Interview with Barry Smith Part 1

== Written works ==
- Warning (1980), ISBN 0-908961-03-0
- Second Warning (1985), ISBN 0-908961-01-4
- Final Notice (1989), ISBN 0-908961-02-2
- Postscript (1992), ISBN 0-908961-04-9
- ...Better Than Nostradamus (1996), ISBN 0-908961-05-7
- The Devil's Jigsaw (1998) ISBN 0-908961-08-1
- I Spy with My Little Eye (1999), ISBN 0-908961-07-3
- Unlocking the Ultimate Secret (2002), ISBN 0-908961-09-X
- Back Door to the New World Order by Barry Smith

== Documentary and video ==
- Back-Door the New World Order
- Eye of the Triangle
- Update on the New World Order
- Mystery Babylon
- Final World Empire & One World Church
- This Generation
- Prophetic Update – New York & Washington DC
- New Millennium – The Third Day
- God’s Prophetic Calendar
- The 3 Frogs of Revelation
- Get the Right Massage
- The Impact of Your Life
- Shake-Up Coming (1998)
- Why I Am A Christian (1998)
- Chaos of the Cults
- Scarlet Woman, One World Church
- The Occult & The Mystery of Iniquity
- Daniel 9, How Long Have We Got
- After Death, What?

== See also ==
- Dispensationalism
- Covenantalism
- Summary of Christian eschatological differences
