= Emmet McHardy =

New Zealand Catholic missionary

Emmet Charles McHardy (27 June 1904 – 17 May 1933) was a New Zealand Catholic missionary. He was born in Pihama, Taranaki, New Zealand, on 27 June 1904. He served as a missionary in the North Solomon Islands on the island of Bougainville.
