= Wiremu Rikihana =

New Zealand tribal leader and politician

Wiremu Rikihana (c. 1851 – 10 July 1933) was a New Zealand tribal leader and politician. Of Māori descent, he identified with the Te Rarawa iwi. He was born in Waireia, Northland, New Zealand, in about 1851. On 1 June 1923, he was appointed to the New Zealand Legislative Council. He served until the end of his term on 31 May 1930.

Rikihana died at Kaihu on 10 July 1933.
