= Thomas Kingsland =

New Zealand cricketer and businessman (1862–1933)

Personal information
- Full name: Thomas Daniel Kingsland
- Born: 16 June 1862; Lower Huntly, Victoria, Australia
- Died: 8 December 1933 (aged 71); Invercargill, Southland, New Zealand

Domestic team information
- Years: Team
- 1877/78–1899/00: Southland
- 1886/87: Otago
- Only FC: 24 February 1887 Otago v Canterbury
- Source: ESPNcricinfo, 15 May 2016

Thomas Daniel Kingsland (16 June 1862 – 8 December 1933) was a New Zealand cricketer and businessman. He played one first-class match for Otago in 1886/87.

== Biography ==
Kingsland's father John (1830–1922) was born in England and migrated to the Victorian goldfields in the 1850s. He was mining at Lower Huntly, near Bendigo, when Thomas was born, and moved to Invercargill in New Zealand later that year. John played cricket for Southland and was Mayor of Invercargill in the 1880s. He founded a tanning, fellmongery and boot manufacturing company in Invercargill, of which Thomas later took charge.

An all-rounder, Thomas Kingsland played most of his cricket for Southland, representing them in non-first-class matches between 1878 and 1900, including matches against the Australian touring teams in 1878 (when he was 15), 1880 and 1896. He took four wickets in each innings against the touring Tasmanian team in 1884. In his one first-class match for Otago he scored 22 (the top score in the innings) and 18, when Otago lost to Canterbury in 1886–87. He later umpired Southland's first first-class match, when they played Otago at Rugby Park in February 1915 and was chairman of the Southland Cricket Association.

He married Rosina Louisa Wilde in June 1888. With his brother and another partner he renamed the family business Kingsland Brothers and Anderson. In the 1920s he left the business and became managing director of Southland Tanneries. He died in December 1933, survived by his widow, one son and two daughters.
