= Harry Fletcher (Scottish footballer) =

Scottish footballer (1879–1917)

Personal information
- Full name: Henry Mungles Fletcher
- Date of birth: 4 September 1879
- Place of birth: Kilmarnock, Scotland
- Date of death: 7 June 1917 (aged 37)
- Place of death: Zillebeke, Belgium
- Position: Full back

Senior career*
Years	Team	Apps	(Gls)
1902–1910	Queen's Park	20	(0)
- * Club domestic league appearances and goals

Henry Mungles Fletcher (4 September 1879 – 7 June 1917) was a Scottish amateur footballer who played in the Scottish League for Queen's Park as a full back.

== Personal life ==
Fletcher attended Glasgow University and worked as a geography teacher at North Kelvinside Higher Grade School and at John Neilson Institution. He served in the Royal Field Artillery and the Royal Horse Artillery during the First World War and was wounded at the Battle of the Somme. Fletcher was holding the rank of second lieutenant when he was killed by shellfire at Zillebeke on 7 June 1917. He was buried in Railway Dugouts Burial Ground (Transport Farm) Cemetery.

== Career statistics ==
Appearances and goals by club, season and competition
Club	Season	League			Scottish Cup		Other		Total	
Club	Season	Division	Apps	Goals	Apps	Goals	Apps	Goals	Apps	Goals
Queen's Park	1902–03	Scottish First Division	4	0	1	0	0	0	5	0
Queen's Park	1906–07	Scottish First Division	7	0	1	0	1 (Note: Appearances in Glasgow Merchants Charity Cup)	0	9	0
Queen's Park	1907–08	Scottish First Division	6	0	0	0	2	0	8	0
Queen's Park	1908–09	Scottish First Division	2	0	0	0	1	0	3	0
Queen's Park	1909–10	Scottish First Division	1	0	0	0	0	0	1	0
Career total			20	0	2	0	4	0	26	0
