= Mary Ann McCarthy =

Irish orphan in Australia, stabbed her husband

Mary Ann McCarthy, born County Galway, Ireland in 1834, was an Irish orphan who fatally stabbed her husband Edward Young in Gulgong, New South Wales after he beat her with a horsewhip.

== Early life in Australia ==
McCarthy was a victim of the Great Famine of Ireland which created widespread starvation. People were dying of starvation and McCarthy was forced to go to a workhouse. At 17 she was selected to take part in Earl Grey Famine Orphan Scheme. After a three months at sea on the Thomas Arbuthnot McCarthy arrived in Sydney in February 1850. Earl Grey's Famine Orphan Scheme transported 4114 Irish orphan girls to the New South Wales colony. The Irish Famine of 1848 to 1850 created widespread famine throughout the land. Thousands of orphans were sent to workhouses in all 32 counties of Ireland. At the height of the Irish Famine, the Earl Grey scheme fashioned a plan to ease overcrowding in the workhouses of Ireland, while providing serving staff and a way to help settle the new Australian colony. The arrival of the Irish women was not universally popular. They were subject to abuse, exploitation and mistreatment by their employers. McCarthy got a job as a milliner but it was cancelled and her wages withheld because of "disobedience". The Irish Orphan young women were housed in the former convict barracks in Macquarie Street, Sydney.

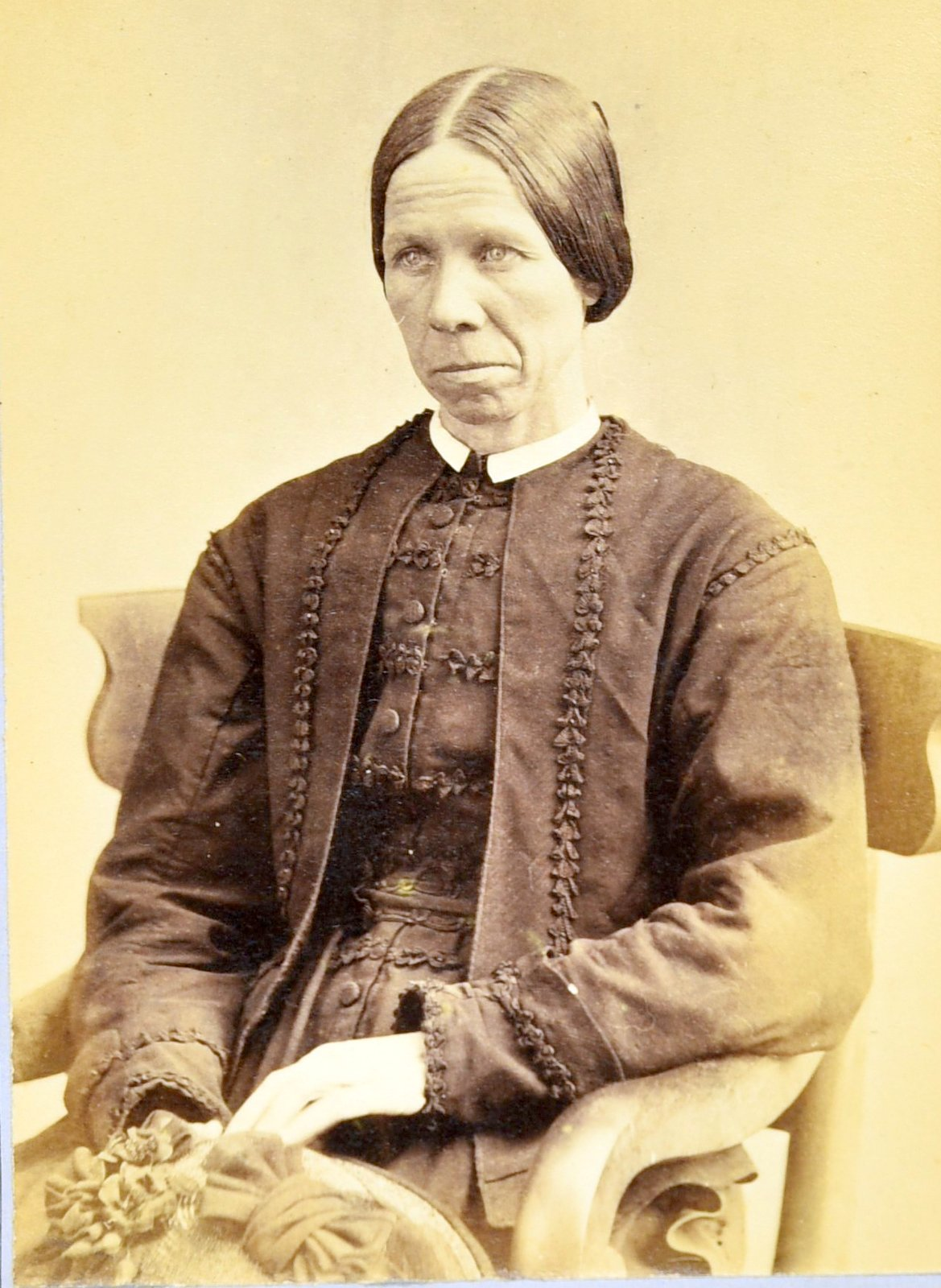
Prison photograph of Mary Ann Young née McCarthy at Darlinghurst Gaol 1872

== Marriages and death ==
Mary Ann was married twice. the first time in Bathurst to George Cooper and the second time to Edward Young in Dubbo. Mary Ann died in 1887 after taking a dose of Chlorodyne, a laudanum-based pain-relieving mixture containing cannabis and chloroform.

== Wife fatally stabs husband ==
Early on Tuesday morning of 20 February 1872 a violent argument broke out in Black Lead Lane, Gulgong between Mary Ann and her husband Edward Jacob Young. Witnesses testified that the deceased had beaten his wife with a horse whip. The pair were seen quarreling, fighting and pulling each other's hair. At one point Edward Young struck his wife so hard that she fell to the ground. She recovered and was going inside the shop when her husband made a remark which must have offended her. She seized a butchers knife and stabbed her husband in the navel, penetrating the liver. Young died instantly.

When the police arrived Mary Ann confessed: "I am the person who did the deed. I don't deny it. I did not do it wilfully. I did it in the heat of passion. The knife was beside me, and I took it up and stabbed him." The case was the talk of town as it was extremely rare for a woman to kill a man.

== The trial ==
Mary Ann was initially charged with murder in Gulgong police court however the prosecutor recommended that the charge be manslaughter. Witnesses testified that Edward Young had beaten her with a horse whip. Mary Ann was committed for trial in Bathurst. The fact that a wife had killed her husband attracted the attention of newspapers across the state. The jury at Parramatta Police Court found her guilty but recommended her for mercy. She was sentenced to six months imprisonment for manslaughter.

== Irish brides ==
Glass panels of Sydney's Famine Memorial feature the names of some of the over 4,000 Irish orphan girls and women who were resettled in the colony between 1848 and 1850 under a transportation plan during the Great Famine.
