= Maria Mackay =

Maria Jane Mackay (née Taylor, 21 July 1844 – 5 February 1933) was a New Zealand founding mother, midwife and nurse. She was born on Norfolk Island on 21 July 1844.
