= James W. Moore (author) =

American minister and writer (1938–2019)

James Wendell Moore
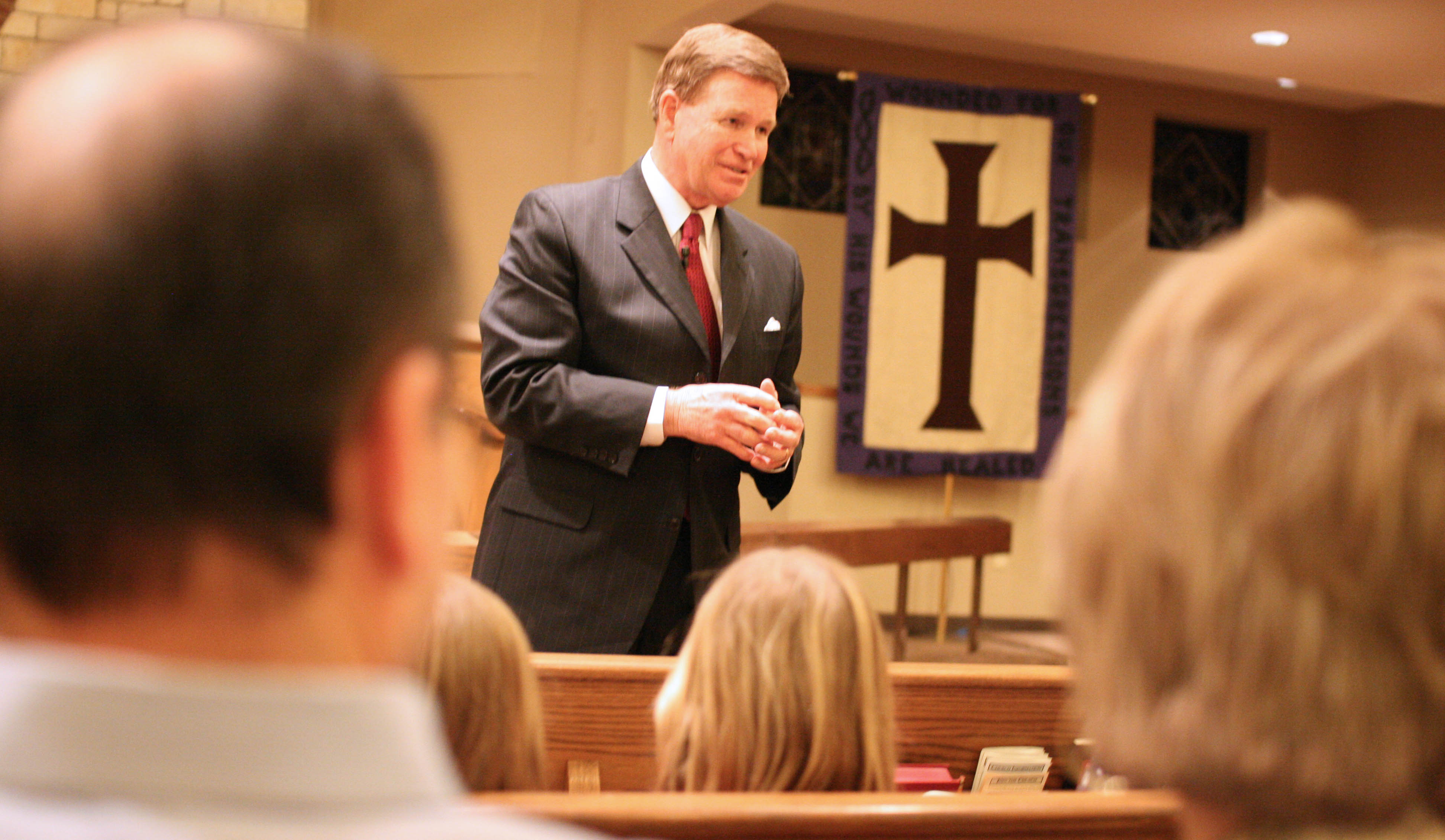
- Moore preaching in 2008.
- Born: April 26, 1938; Memphis, Tennessee, U.S.
- Died: June 6, 2019 (aged 81); Dallas, Texas, U.S.
- Occupations: Minister; author
- Spouse: June Moore (m. 1959)
- Children: 2

James W. Moore (April 26, 1938 – June 6, 2019) was an American bestselling author of over 40 books, Abingdon Press' top selling author. He was a preacher and pastor, an ordained elder in the United Methodist Church. He served as Senior Pastor of St. Luke's United Methodist Church –Houston (over 7,500 members) from 1984 to 2006. In 2006, after 50 years of active ministry, he retired from full-time ministry in the Texas Conference of the UMC and moved to the Dallas area. At the time of his death, he was serving as Minister in Residence at Highland Park United Methodist Church.

Moore died on June 6, 2019, at the age of 81.

== Education ==
Lambuth College (Bachelor of Arts)
Methodist Theological School in Ohio (Masters of Divinity - 1963)
Centenary College of Louisiana (Doctor of Divinity).

== Ordained ministry positions ==
Associate Pastor of the First United Methodist Church of Jackson, Tennessee, 1965-70
Associate Director of the Memphis Conference Council on Ministries, 1970-72.
Co-pastor of First United Methodist Church of Shreveport, 1972-84 (shared the pulpit with Dr. D. L. Dykes Jr.)
Senior Pastor of St. Luke's United Methodist Church in Houston, 1984-2006.

== Leadership ==
Member of the Board of Directors of The Methodist Hospital in the Houston Medical Center
Member of the Board of Trustees of Southwestern University in Georgetown, Texas
Member of the Executive Board at Perkins School of Theology in Dallas
Member of the Houston Committee for Private Sector Initiatives
Member National United Methodist General Council on Ministries
United Methodist Commission on Communications
Leader of the Texas Conference Delegation to General Conference in 1996
Delegate to General Conference of the United Methodist Church four times (1992, 1996, 2000, and 2004)

== Awards ==
J. Henry Bowden Sr. Preaching Award (recognition of outstanding preaching on moral issues)
John and Ruth Mount Alumni Award for Parish Ministry by The Methodist Theological School in Ohio
Caring Spirit Award by The Houston Medical Center's Institute of Religion
R.E. Womack Achievement Award (Outstanding Alumnus) from Lambuth University
Sustaining Presence Award by Interfaith CarePartners

== Books ==
- ’’Seizing the Moments’’ (Abingdon Press bestseller 1988; December Book of the Month, Guideposts)
- You Can Get Bitter Or Better, (Silver Angel Award 1989); https://web.archive.org/web/20090210034515/http://angelawards.com/
- Yes Lord I Have Sinned But I Have Several Excellent Excuses
- Can You Remember To Forget; Is There Life After Stress?
- When All Else Fails, Read The Instructions; Healing Where It Hurts
- Some Things Are Too Good Not To Be True
- When Grief Breaks Your Heart
- Christmas Gifts That Always Fit
- The Top Ten List for Graduates
- What Can We Learn From the Christ Child?
- When You're a Christian, the Whole World is from Missouri
- Attitude is Your Paintbrush, It Colors Every Situation
- The Top Ten List for Christians
- Some Folks Feel the Rain Others Just Get Wet
- The Cross Walk
- O Say Can You See; Advent
- A Calendar of Devotions
- God Was Here and I was Out to Lunch
- Let’s Go Over to Bethlehem
- At the End of the Day
- 9/11: What a Difference a Day Makes
- Won’t You Let Him In
- If God Has a Refrigerator, Your Picture Is on It
- Noah Built His Ark in the Sunshine
- The Common People Heard Him Gladly
- Jesus’ Parables of Grace
- If You're Going the Wrong Way... Turn Around
- The Sanctuary for Lent 2005
- Jesus’ Parables of Life
- There's a Hole in Your Soul that Only God Can Fill
- Jesus’ Parables of the Lost and Found
- Rich in the Things That Count The Most
- The Sanctuary for Lent 2006
- The Miracle of Christmas
- Jesus’ Parables about Making Choices
- On the Road Again
- Faith is the Answer, But What are the Questions?
