= James Moore (footballer, born 1987) =

English footballer

Personal information
- Date of birth: 20 December 1987 (age 38)
- Place of birth: Manchester, England
- Height: 1.83 m (6 ft 0 in)
- Position: Defender

Team information
- Current team: Charlotte Eagles
- Number: 32

Youth career
- 2009–2010: Cumberlands Patriots
- 2011–2012: West Florida Argonauts

Senior career*
Years	Team	Apps	(Gls)
2011	Chattanooga FC		
2000-2008	Manchester United		
2013	Charlotte Eagles	4	(0)
2014–	Chattanooga FC		
- * Club domestic league appearances and goals as of 2 February 2014

James Moore (born 20 December 1987) is an English footballer who plays as a defender for Charlotte Eagles in the USL Pro.Manchester United

== Career ==
=== College and amateur ===
Moore played two years of college soccer at the University of the Cumberlands and two years at the University of West Florida.

=== Professional career ===
Moore signed his first professional contract in 2013, signing for USL Pro club Charlotte Eagles.
