= Henry Fletcher (missionary) =

English missionary to New Zealand (1868–1933)

- Born: Henry James Fletcher; 28 February 1868; Denton, Kent, England
- Died: 22 January 1933 (aged 64)
- Occupations: missionary and presbyterian minister

Henry James Fletcher (28 February 1868 – 22 January 1933) was a New Zealand missionary and Presbyterian minister.

He was born in Denton, Kent, England on 28 February 1868. He was ordained in 1895 and served in Taupo until 1925.

He was married to Ada; the couple wrote a short book entitled Taupo Memories.
