= Dayton Waller =

American politician

Member of the Louisiana House of Representatives
- In office 1968–1972

Personal details
- Born: Dayton Hollis Waller Jr. April 2, 1925 Shreveport, Louisiana, U.S.
- Died: May 26, 2015 (aged 90)
- Party: Democratic
- Education: Centenary College of Louisiana

Dayton Hollis Waller Jr. (April 2, 1925 – May 26, 2015) was an American politician. A member of the Democratic Party, he served in the Louisiana House of Representatives from 1968 to 1972.

== Life and career ==
Waller was born in Shreveport, Louisiana, the son of Dayton Hollis Waller Sr. and Elisabeth Lane. He attended C. E. Byrd High School, but his education was interrupted when he enlisted in the United States Army. After his discharge, he received his high school diploma, which after receiving his diploma, he attended Centenary College of Louisiana, where he played college basketball as a center for the Centenary Gentlemen.

Waller served in the Louisiana House of Representatives from 1968 to 1972.

== Death ==
Waller died on May 26, 2015, at the age of 90.
