= Trevor H. Howard-Hill =

New Zealand English literature academic (1933–2011) (1933-2011)

Trevor H. Howard-Hill (October 17, 1933 - June 1, 2011) was a New Zealand born scholar of English literature. He was considered a leading figure in the field of bibliography and book history and an important voice in debates over editorial theory.

Howard-Hill was well known in his fields for two major reference works. The Index to British Literary Bibliography, a project that Howard-Hill conceived in the early 1960s, was published in eleven volumes over three decades, from 1969 to 2009. An early proponent of the field of literary computing, he also produced the 37-volume Oxford Shakespeare Concordances, published from 1969 to 1973. Within Shakespeare scholarship, Howard-Hill is known for his work on Ralph Crane, a theater scribe who wrote out several of the early surviving manuscripts of Shakespeare's plays.

After earning his Ph.D. at New Zealand's Victoria University of Wellington in 1960, and working as head of cataloging at the Alexander Turnbull Library, he moved to Great Britain and became a research fellow at Oxford from 1965 to 1970. In 1972, he joined the faculty of the University of South Carolina, where he would work until his retirement in 1999. He was awarded a Guggenheim Fellowship in 1989 in the field of Bibliography. After his retirement, he continued to serve as the editor of the Papers of the Bibliographical Society of America, a post he had taken up in 1994.
