= William Barker McEwan =

New Zealand librarian (1870–1933)

William Barker McEwan (17 December 1870 – 2 May 1933) was a New Zealand librarian. He was born in Edinburgh, Midlothian, Scotland on 17 December 1870.

== Career ==
The son of stonemason William McEwan and Mary Barker, William Barker McEwan was educated at a George Heriot's School and was apprenticed to bookseller Robert Somerville of Stockbridge. This led to his lifelong career as a librarian of private and public collections.

McEwan's first public librarian role was in 1903 as chief librarian in Stirling. In 1906 he emigrated to New Zealand with his wife Elizabeth. After working in Auckland and Westport, McEwan took up the role as Dunedin city librarian in 1908. He was the first librarian of what would become the Dunedin Public Libraries; his roles included staffing, stocking, furnishing, and managing the library. The library, in its original location at 110 Moray Place, steadily expanded. By McEwan's death in 1933, by which time he had contributed twenty-five years of service to the library, he had procured for the library over 50,000 books. This total included private collections donated to the library for public use by Alfred Hamish Reed and Robert McNab.

In addition to his work as city librarian, McEwan was a founding member of the Libraries Association of New Zealand. He frequently gave public addresses on library and literary matters and established a school library system in Dunedin.

== Personal life ==
McEwan married Elizabeth Stanners McArthur on 16 June 1896. The couple had four sons and two daughters.

A lover of Scottish literature, McEwan was president of the Dunedin Burns Club for five years. His sporting interests included cricket and football. He was also a member of the Freemasons.
