= New Zealand Opera Company =

National opera company in New Zealand (1954–1971)

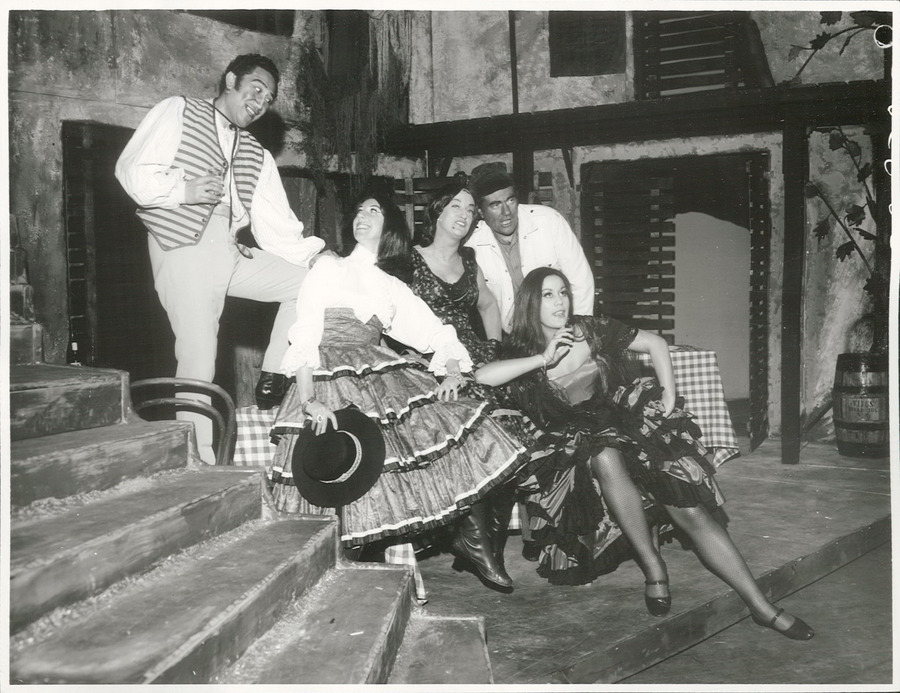
- The New Zealand Opera Company's production of Carmen in 1969
- Formation: 1954
- Dissolved: 1971
- Type: Opera company
- Location: Auckland, New Zealand
- Leader: Donald Munro

The New Zealand Opera Company was New Zealand's first resident professional national company, formed by baritone Donald Munro in 1954. Its first full-scale work was Mozart's Marriage of Figaro in 1958, which toured 47 towns. From 1963 funding from the QE II Arts Council allowed national tours with a full orchestra, including a production of Porgy and Bess with a Māori cast including Īnia Te Wiata, and Ngaio Marsh's A Unicorn for Christmas with music by David Farquhar. After Arts Council funding was withdrawn in 1971 the company folded.
