= James Moore (New Zealand cricketer) =

New Zealand cricketer (1877–1933)

Personal information
- Full name: James Gerald Harle Moore
- Born: 18 September 1877; Kaihiku, Otago, New Zealand
- Died: 6 April 1933 (aged 55); St Peters, Sydney, New South Wales, Australia

Domestic team information
- Years: Team
- 1905/06: Otago
- Source: ESPNcricinfo, 17 May 2016

James Gerald Harle Moore (18 September 1877 – 6 April 1933) was a New Zealand cricketer. He played two first-class matches for Otago during the 1905–06 season.

Moore was born at Kaihiku in Otago in 1877 and later lived in the Caversham area of Dunedin. He served as a private in the Boer War in the 9th (Otago) Company, part of the 4th New Zealand Contingent. He later wrote a book, With the Fourth New Zealand Rough Riders, about his service in South Africa.

Moore played in both of Otago's first-class matches during the 1905–06 season, making a pair his debut for the representative side against Canterbury at Christchurch in a match starting on Christmas Day 1905. He fared little better against Auckland in early January, scoring one run in the first innings and recording another duck in the second.

Professionally Moore worked as a woolclasser at Mosgiel Woollen Mill and was for a time the representative of the New Zealand government in Argentina. He died at the Sydney suburb of St Peters in 1933 at the age of 55.
