= Mary McCarthy (activist) =

New Zealand teacher and activist (1866–1933)

Mary Ann Recknall McCarthy (11 August 1866 – 13 October 1933) was a New Zealand teacher, temperance worker and political activist. She was born in Dunedin, New Zealand, on 11 August 1866.
