= Jimmy Strain =

American politician

Member of the Louisiana House of Representatives
- In office 1968–1972

Personal details
- Born: August 28, 1926
- Died: December 30, 1973 (aged 47)
- Party: Democratic
- Education: Johns Hopkins University

Jimmy Strain (August 28, 1926 – December 30, 1973) was an American politician who served as a Democratic member of the Louisiana House of Representatives.

== Life and career ==
Strain attended LSU Health Sciences Center Shreveport and Johns Hopkins University.

In 1968, Strain was elected to the Louisiana House of Representatives, serving until 1972. In the same year, he moved to Florida and was an assistant pediatrician.

Strain died in December 1973 with an apparently self-inflicted gunshot wound, at the age of 47.
