= Wellington City Opera =

Professional opera company in Wellington, New Zealand (1984–1998)

- Wellington City Opera Trust
- Merged into: New Zealand Opera
- Successor: National Opera of Wellington
- Formation: 1982
- Dissolved: 2000
- Type: Opera company
- Location: Wellington, New Zealand
- Chairman: Ian Cochrane (1982–1986); Maurice Leech (1986–1991); Bruce Carson (1991–1997); Gregory Aim (1997–1999)
- Formerly called: De La Tour Regional Opera Trust

Wellington City Opera was a professional opera company based in Wellington, New Zealand. It originated in 1982 as the De La Tour Regional Opera Trust, and in 1999, 18 months after rebranding as The National Opera of Wellington, merged with Auckland-based Opera New Zealand to form New Zealand Opera.

== Origin ==
After the demise of the New Zealand Opera Company in 1971, several organisations arose to fill the gap. The De La Tour Opera Group was founded in Wellington in 1975 to present chamber opera in a variety of venues, with minimal costuming and sets, often with piano accompaniment. The artistic director was Geoffrey De Lautour, an opera professional who had returned to New Zealand in the 1950s. In 1982 with the help of lawyer Ian Cochrane the group incorporated and became the De La Tour Regional Opera Trust, with Cochrane as chairman and De Lautour as deputy chair and artistic director. The group's aim was to promote and present professional opera in Wellington and nearby.

The Trust's first professional production was Verdi's La traviata at Victoria University's Memorial Theatre, which opened on 21 September 1982. The set was simple painted flats, many of the production crew were volunteers, and the singers performed for free. The next production, in April 1983 at the same venue, was Madame Butterfly. De Lautour directed both to favourable reviews.

== Wellington City Opera ==
In 1984 the Trust added five members to its board and changed its name to Wellington City Opera, to emphasise its connection to the capital and better attract corporate sponsorship. Puccini's Tosca was the production that year, and controversially double-cast the four principal singers. It was again well-received. In 1985 the company began its association with principal sponsor Caltex, who supplied $150,000 of support over the next three years, and continued to supply two- and three-year sponsorship packages for over a decade. Wellington City Opera appointed a professional administrator and moved its productions to the State Opera House, beginning with 1985's The Barber of Seville, with Patrick Power as Count Almaviva and Wendy Dixon as Rosina. The production, directed by Raymond Boyce, was considered a significant artistic and financial advance on previous work.

In 1988 Wellington City Opera administered the Caltex Opera Scholarships, a short-lived singing competition supported by the New Zealand Opera Society. The "lacklustre" quality of the applicants led to its demise.

Wellington City Opera had become one of the capital's largest performing arts groups by the early 1990s. Since 1989 it had generally staged three operas a year, reducing this to two in alternate years when the biennial New Zealand International Festival of the Arts staged an opera; the first was in Die Meistersinger von Nürnberg in 1990. The company continued a succession of professional productions, including The Merry Widow (1993), Turandot (1994), Peter Grimes (1995), and Rigoletto (1996). Some of its productions were staged in partnership with Canterbury Opera, founded in 1985.

== National Opera of Wellington ==
In 1996 a drop in world oil prices caused Caltex NZ to cut back its support of the company, and Creative New Zealand reduced its funding in 1997 and 1998. Wellington City Opera began to look at other sponsorship arrangements. In 1995 Auckland Opera had renamed itself Opera New Zealand, which gave the impression that Wellington City Opera and Canterbury Opera were regional companies. To counter that perception Wellington City Opera renamed itself The National Opera of Wellington in February 1998, with that year's production, La bohème, its first at the St. James Theatre, a venue that cost twice as much to hire as the Opera House.

La bohème had a young cast, with Sarah Hills and Jae-Woo Kim as Mimi and Rodolfo, and Jonathan Lemalu in his professional opera debut as Colline. It was theatre director Colin McColl's first opera, and the contemporary setting prompted one critic to call it "Puccini as Trainspotting". Popular and successful, it was followed later that year by Verdi's Otello, with seasoned performers Suzanne Prain and her real-life husband Christopher Doig, in a rare return to the stage, as Desdemona and Othello (They had previously appeared together as Mimi and Rodolfo in the 1991 production of La bohème). The production was seen as competent and traditional, but made a loss. Financial circumstances forced the company to cut one of its three planned 1999 productions.

Mozart's The Magic Flute opened in March 1999, with Debbie Wai Kapohe as Pamina and Mark Pedrotti as Papageno; it used the sets and costumes from the 1996 Canterbury Opera production. In October it was followed by a very successful co-production with Canterbury Opera of Madame Butterfly, with Patrick Power (Pinkerton) and Malvina Major (Butterfly). Butterfly's mother was played by Heather Taylor, who had played the title role in the company's 1983 production of the same opera. Directed by Phillip Mann, it was the last production of The National Opera of Wellington as an independent company.

In 1999 the company merged with Auckland-based Opera New Zealand to form a new national opera company, which launched on 15 October 1999 as The National Business Review New Zealand Opera (the National Business Review had paid $1,000,000 for naming rights for the next three years). The Wellington chorus was renamed The Chapman Tripp Opera Chorus, and The National Opera of Wellington became a support organisation to manage its investment in New Zealand Opera. The first production of the new merged company was Aida in 2000.
