= John Lomas (trade unionist) =

John Lomas (27 February 1848 – 16 November 1933) was a New Zealand coalminer, trade unionist and public servant. He was born in Disley, Cheshire, England on 27 February 1848.
