= C. E. Byrd High School =

High school in Shreveport, Louisiana, US

C.E. Byrd High School
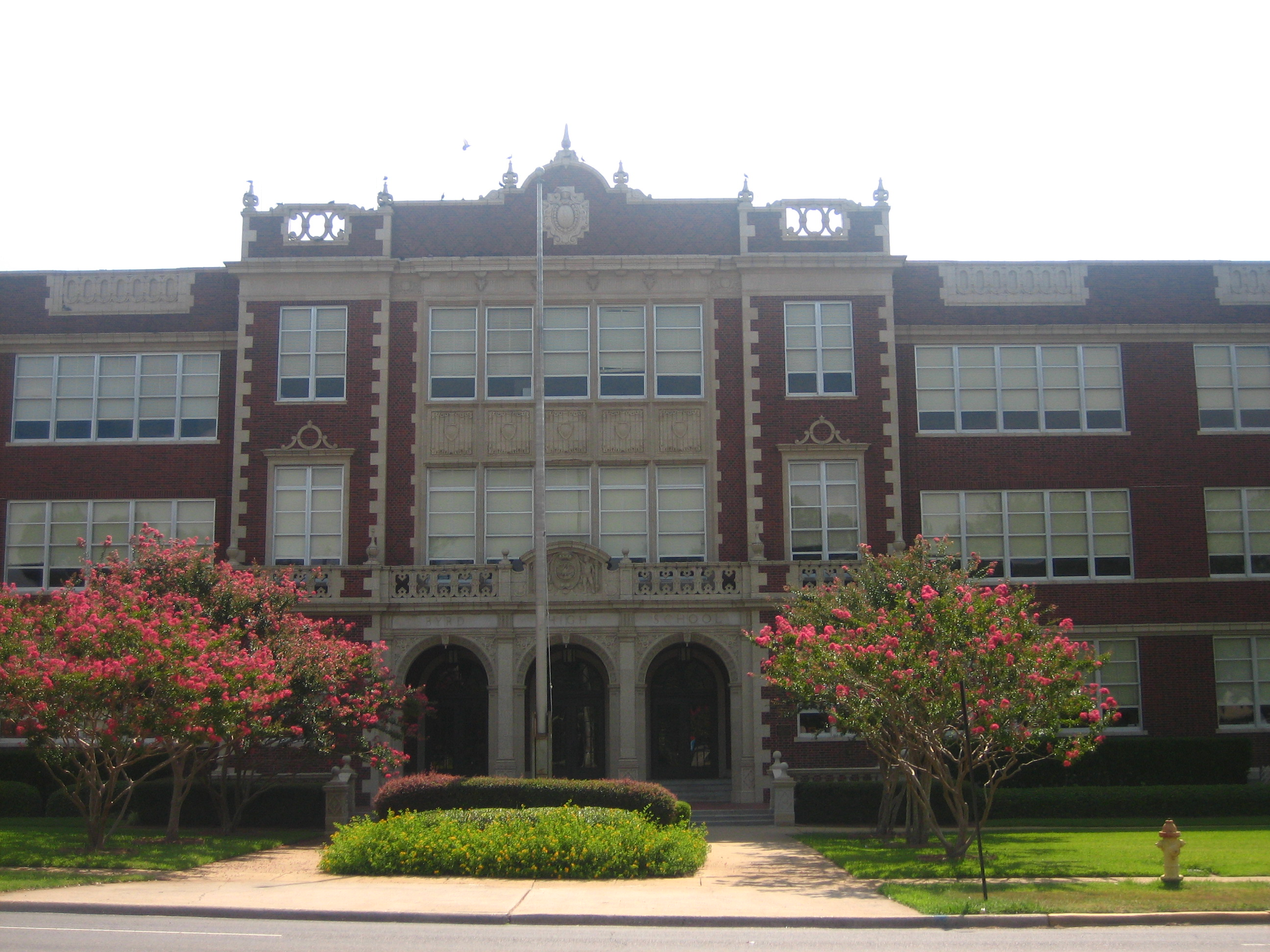

Location
- 3201 Line Avenue; Shreveport, Louisiana 71104; United States

Information
- School type: Public with magnet program
- Established: 1925
- Founder: Clifton Ellis Byrd
- School board: Caddo Parish
- Principal: Jana Panos
- Teaching staff: 120
- Grades: 9–12
- Enrollment: 1,517 (2024–2025)
- Student to teacher ratio: 18:1
- Colors: Purple and gold
- Nickname: Yellow Jackets
- Rival: Airline Vikings; Captain Shreve Gators; Evangel Eagles
- Website: www.cebyrd.com
- C. E. Byrd High School
- U.S. National Register of Historic Places
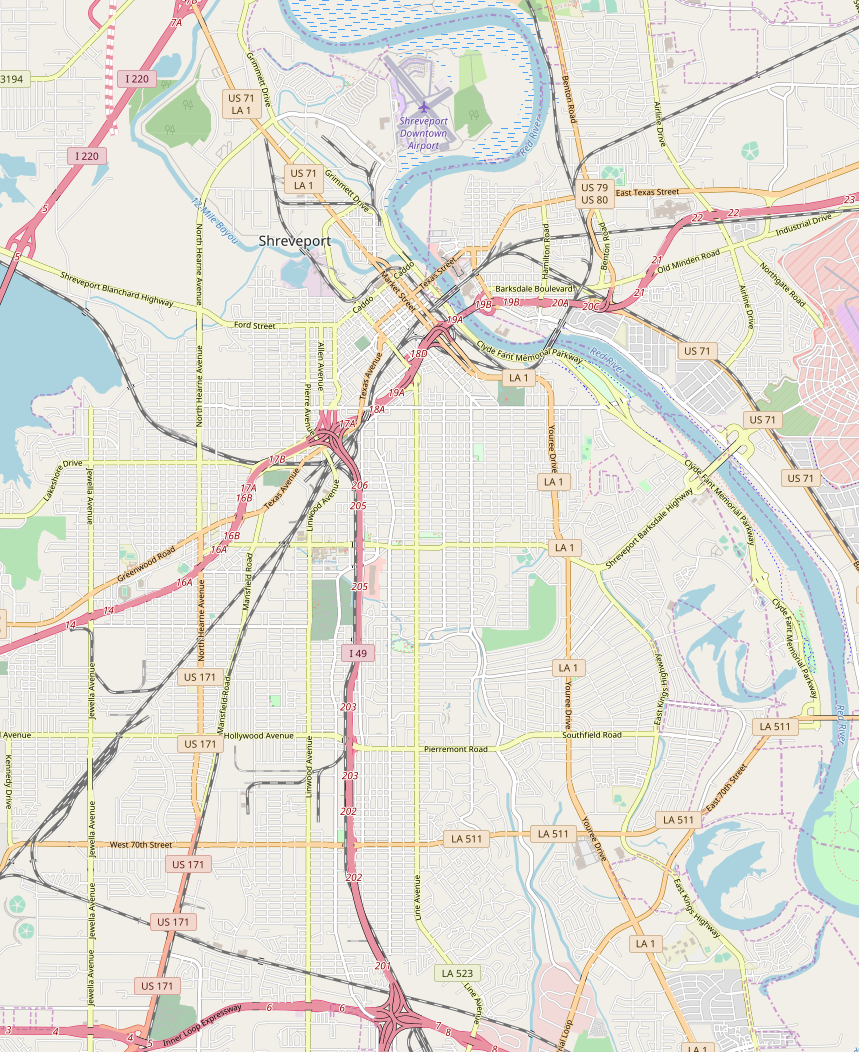
- Location within Shreveport
- Location: 3201 Line Avenue, Shreveport, Louisiana
- Coordinates: 32°28′49″N 93°44′43″W
- Area: 8 acres (3.2 ha)
- Built: 1924
- Built by: Stewart McGehee Construction Co.
- Architect: Edward F. Neild
- Architectural style: Tudor Revival, Other, Jacobean Revival
- NRHP reference No.: 91000704
- Added to NRHP: June 10, 1991

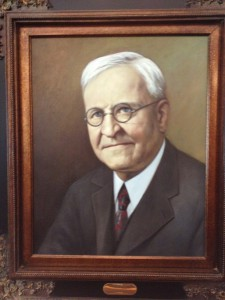
C. E. Byrd (c. 1907) as the president of Louisiana Tech University

C. E. Byrd High School is a public and magnet high school in Shreveport, Louisiana, U.S. It is a Blue Ribbon School, in continuous operation since its establishment in 1925. Byrd students come from its neighborhood, or throughout the entire school district through its selective math/science magnet program. The school building is listed on the National Register of Historic Places since 1991.

== History ==
In 1892, C. E. Byrd came to Shreveport as principal of the first public high school, in two rented rooms in the YMCA building at a salary of $70 per month. The early years of the school were segregated for white students. From 1917 until 1950, Central High School was the only public high school for African American students in Shreveport; and Milam Street Trade School (1939–1955) was the vocational school for high school African American students.

The school moved to the Soady Building on Crockett Street, with first year enrollment of 70 in 1898. A year later in 1899, the school moved to the Hope Street School, a large three story red brick building. Elementary students occupied the first floor, intermediate the second, and high school the third. In 1910, Shreveport High School was built adjacent to Hope Street. Caddo Parish School Board decides to build two new high schools in 1923. 20-acre (81,000 m^{2}) Site purchased from Justin Gras for $110,000 and four adjacent lots in Bon Air Subdivision, from F.R. Chadick for $9,500. Stewart-McGee awarded the building contract for $772,133 in 1924. On October 3, 1924, the cornerstone laid with full Masonic ceremonies including a letter from C. E. Byrd; a boll weevil symbolizing problems of the farmer; a bottle of oil, symbolic of the oil business; an ear of corn representing agriculture; coins representing the financial situation, and a Bible.

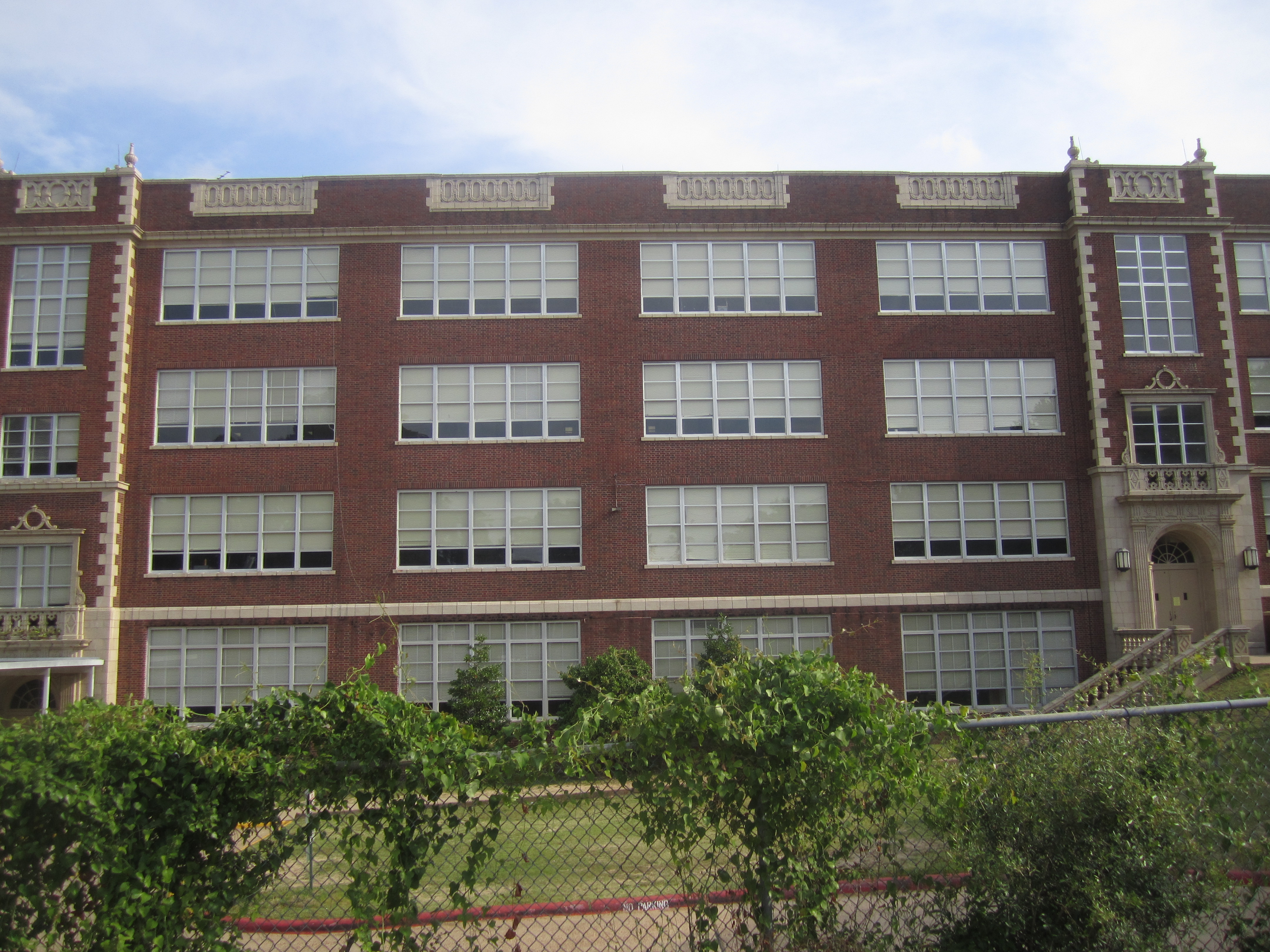
Side view of Byrd High School from Kings Highway

Board authorized $40,000 to furnish the building in 1925. Building accepted from the contractor on June 27. Because furniture had not yet arrived, the opening was delayed until October.

Front side view of Byrd High School

=== 1960s–1970s: desegregation ===
- 1967: First African-American graduate, Arthur Burton.
- 1968: As part of an order to desegregate, neighborhood school district boundaries were abolished and students were allowed to select schools under a protocol known as "Freedom of Choice." Courts found this policy did not accomplish desegregation
- 1969: New districts were created in the summer of 1969 forcing thousands of students to change schools. Faculty from historically black high schools were exchanged with those from historically white high schools and students from Captain Shreve High School returned to Byrd as their neighborhood school.

1970: In an attempt to further desegregate, Valencia High School (now Caddo Magnet High School) was merged with Byrd. Students class schedules were changed at the start of the new semester in order to "mix" the students from the two schools. The Black administrators from Valencia were given minor roles at Byrd.

Tensions were high with student protests. As a result of these protests, police were called in to guard the doors of the school. Students were not allowed to leave the building once they came to school for the day. Senior rings had been ordered the previous year, so each wore their own class rings. While students from both schools participated in the same commencement exercises they wore different colored academic regalia, that represented their schools.

Byrd High subsequently fell victim to "white flight" with many parents sending their children to Jesuit High School (now Loyola), St. Vincent's Academy, or one of several new private schools. Enrollment decreased to the point that Byrd faced possible closure. Byrd returned as a powerhouse by re-inventing itself as a Math and Science magnet school.

The 8 acres (3.2 ha) area comprising the school building and three other non-contributing properties were added to the National Register of Historic Places in 1991. The elaborate four story brick structure designed by Edward F. Neild has seen several alterations since its construction in 1924. The structure, however, still retains its original visual impact and is significant in the area of architecture. Byrd remains one of few examples of Jacobean Revival architecture.

== Student media ==
- Literary magazine: Perspectives
- Newspaper: Highlife
- TV station: K-BYRD
- Yearbook: Gusher

== Athletics ==
C. E. Byrd High athletics competes in the LHSAA.

=== Championships ===
Football championships

- (10) State Championships: 1914, 1915, 1922, 1926, 1930, 1931, 1934, 1935, 1937, 1949

Boys golf championships

- (8) State Championships: 2014, 2015, 2016, 2018, 2019, 2022, 2023, 2024

Girls golf championships

- (1) State Championships: 2019

Girls soccer championships

- (1) State Championships: 1996

Boys basketball championships

- (1) State Championships: 1994

Girls basketball championships

- (2) State Championships: 1993, 1994

=== Coaches ===
- Lee Hedges, football

== Notable alumni ==
- Edward C. Aldridge Jr. (1956), president and CEO of The Aerospace Corporation
- John N. Bahcall, astrophysicist known for his work on solar neutrino problem
- Fuller W. Bazer (1956), O.D. Butler Chair in Animal Science at Texas A&M; Wolf Prize in Agriculture
- Betsy Boze, Ph.D. (formerly Betsy Vogel) (1971), president of the College of The Bahamas
- Karen Carlson, actress
- Judith A. Cooper (1967), speech pathologist
- John Howard Dalton (1959), former U.S. Secretary of the Navy
- Jordan Davis (2006), country singer
- Tillman Franks (1940), songwriter
- Brandon Friedman (1996), former Deputy Assistant Secretary, United States Department of Housing and Urban Development; author of The War I Always Wanted
- Alfred C. Glassell Jr., businessman, philanthropist and big-game fisherman
- Helen Lefkowitz Horowitz (1959), 2003 Pulitzer Prize in history
- Tom Jarriel (1952), ABC News journalist
- Faith Jenkins (1994), Miss Louisiana 2000, Miss America 2001 first runner-up, attorney and legal analyst
- Victor Joris, fashion designer.
- William Joyce (1976), Academy Award winner, children's book author and illustrator
- Merle Kilgore (1952), singer, songwriter, and manager
- Aaron Selber, Jr. (1944), businessman and philanthropist
- Andy Sidaris (1948), television producer, director (B movies), actor and writer
- Shelby Singleton, record producer and record label owner
- William T. Whisner, Jr. (1923–1989), flying ace in World War II and Korean War

=== Elected officials and judiciary ===
- Saxby Chambliss (1961) (born 1943), Republican U.S. senator from Georgia, 2002–2015
- George W. D'Artois (c. 1942) (1925–1977), Shreveport public service commissioner from 1962 to 1976
- William J. Fleniken (c. 1925) (1908–1979), U.S. Attorney for United States District Court for the Western District of Louisiana, 1950–1953, judge of state 1st Judicial District Court in Shreveport, 1961–1979
- Frank Fulco (1928) (1909–1999), Louisiana House of Representatives (1956–1972)
- Pike Hall Jr. (c. 1947) (1931–1999), member of Caddo Parish School Board 1964–1970; state appeal court judge 1971–1990, associate justice of the Louisiana Supreme Court 1990–1994
- James C. Gardner (1940) (1924–2010), Shreveport mayor (1954–1958) and state representative (1952–1954)
- William T. "Bill" Hanna (1947) (1930–2016), Shreveport Democratic mayor (1978–1982) and Caddo Parish administrator
- Eric Johnson (Georgia politician) (1953) Georgia state senator, 1994–2009
- J. Bennett Johnston, Jr. (1950) (born 1932), Louisiana Democratic U.S. senator (1972–1997)
- Robert Kostelka (1949) (born 1933), Louisiana state senator and former state court judge from Ouachita Parish
- Charles B. Peatross (1958) (1940–2015), judge of Louisiana Second Circuit Court of Appeal in Shreveport
- Tom Rowland, former mayor of Cleveland, Tennessee
- Virginia Kilpatrick Shehee (1940) (1923–2015), Chairman, Kilpatrick Life Insurance Company, former state senator from Caddo Parish
- Phil Short (1965) (born 1947), former state senator from St. Tammany Parish; United States Marine Corps officer
- Art Sour (c. 1941) (1924–2000), Shreveport Republican state legislator (1972–1992)
- Tom Stagg (1939) (1923–2015), judge of the United States District Court for the Western District of Louisiana
- Jeffrey P. Victory, Louisiana Supreme Court judge
- Dayton Waller (1925–2015), member of the Louisiana House of Representatives
- Jacques L. Wiener, Jr. (1952), U.S. Circuit Court judge

=== Athletes ===
- Arnaz Battle (1998), wide receiver for NFL's San Francisco 49ers and Pittsburgh Steelers
- Harry Davis (1908–1997), Major League Baseball player
- Pat "Gravy" Patterson (1934–2007), Byrd High School coach 1963–1967
- Seth Morehead (1934-2006), Major League Baseball pitcher
- Scotty Robertson (1947), head coach of NBA's New Orleans Jazz, Chicago Bulls and Detroit Pistons
- Dan Sandifer (1943), defensive back for six NFL teams
- David Woodley, quarterback at LSU (1976–1979), played for Miami Dolphins (1980–1983) and the Pittsburgh Steelers (1984–1985)
- Jonathan Stewart (2009), linebacker at Texas A&M (2009–2013), played for St. Louis Rams, Cleveland Browns and Dallas Cowboys
- Pat Studstill, NFL punter and wide receiver for Detroit Lions, Los Angeles Rams
- James Sykes (1971), football player, Calgary Stampeders 1975–1982; Winnipeg Blue Bombers 1983 and 1986
- Isaac Hagins (1972), football player, Tampa Bay Buccaneers 1976–1980
- Liffort Hobley (1978-1980), QB, DB, Football Player, at LSU 2 times Defensive MVP at Safety, St. Louis Football Cardinals(1985-1986) and Miami Dolphins (1987-1993)

== See also ==
- National Register of Historic Places listings in Caddo Parish, Louisiana
