= Lee Hedges =

American football coach (1929–2023)

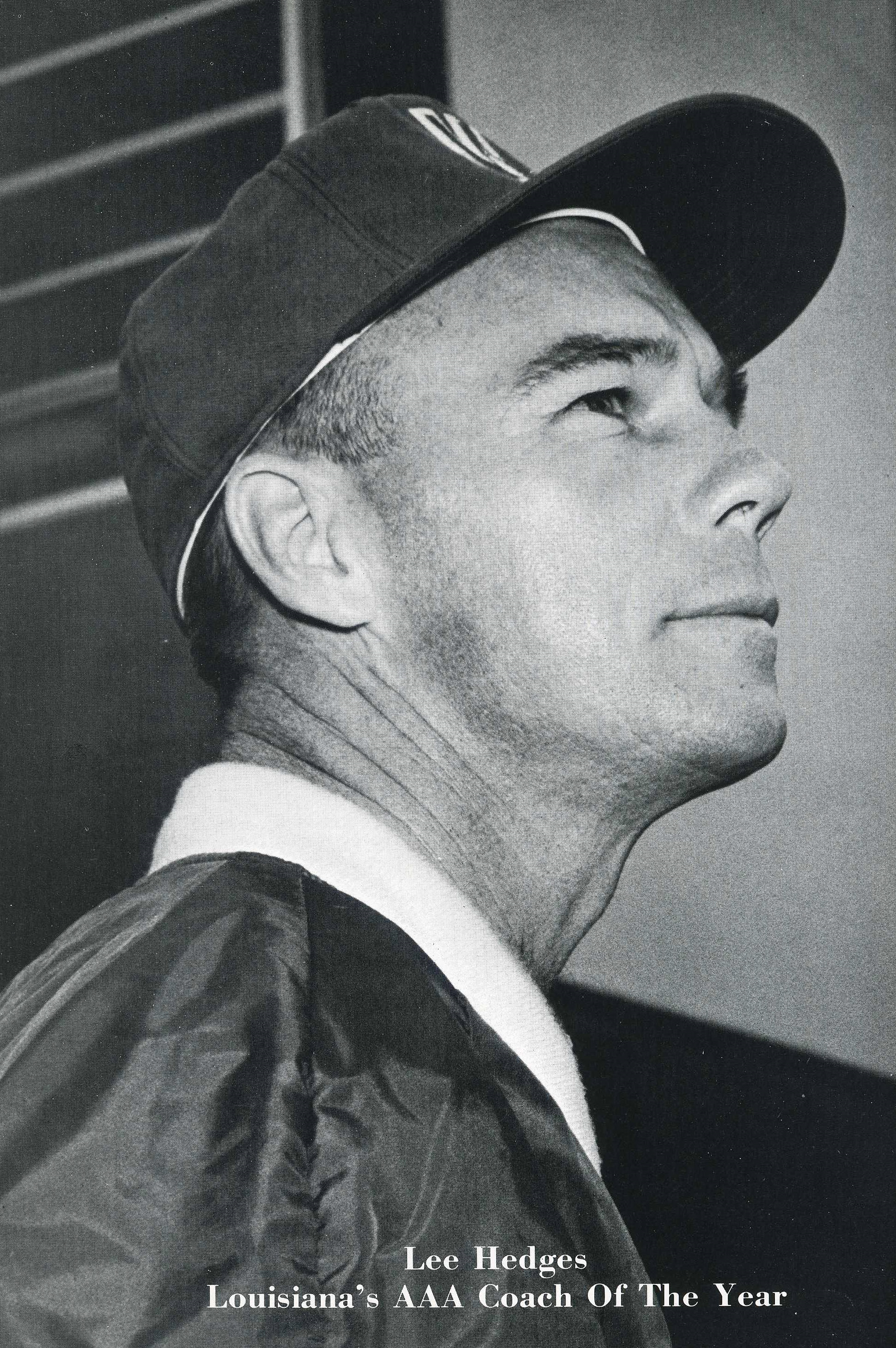
- Hedges in the 1966 Woodlawn Accolade yearbook
- Born: Junior Lee Hedges; November 2, 1929; Fifty-Six, Arkansas, U.S.
- Died: July 9, 2023 (aged 93)
- Education: Fair Park High School; Louisiana State University
- Occupation: Football coach
- Political party: Democrat
- Spouse: Nell Womack (m. 1954; died 2013)
- Children: 2

Junior Lee Hedges (November 2, 1929 – July 9, 2023) was an American high school football coach. His 217 victories are the most wins in the history of Shreveport–Bossier City in northwestern Louisiana. In 2001, the Caddo Parish School Board renamed the football stadium at Captain Shreve High School in Hedges' honor. In 2010, he was elected to the Louisiana Sports Hall of Fame in Natchitoches.

== Overview ==
His 1973 team at Captain Shreve was, as of the 2021 season, the last Shreveport-Bossier public school squad to win a state football championship. Hedges was head coach for three Shreveport public high school teams -- Byrd Yellow Jackets (1956–59), Woodlawn Knights (1960–65), and Captain Shreve Gators (1967–84). He guided teams from each school into state championship games.

In 28 seasons, Hedges' teams posted a 216–92–9 (.698) record and had 24 winning seasons, reaching the playoffs 19 times and winning 11 district championships. Five of his teams reached the state semifinals. Three teams which did not make the playoffs had either 9–2 or 8–2 records. The most prominent of the athletes Hedges coached was quarterback Terry Bradshaw, the four-time Super Bowl champion with the Pittsburgh Steelers and Pro Football Hall of Fame selection. He was a first-year starter on Hedges' 1965 Woodlawn High School team that reached the state championship game.

Hedges' record might have been more impressive if not for two seasons in which he started programs at brand-new schools. His 1960 Woodlawn team went 0–9, not scoring for the first six games, but the 1961 team went 9–3 and won the District 1-AAA championship. His 1967 Captain Shreve team went 1–7; the 1968 team finished second in its district and made the state playoffs. Without those two first-year seasons, his teams averaged more than eight wins per year.

The Shreveport coach whose win total he surpassed was his own coach at Fair Park, Homer Prendergast, who in 23 years as the Indians' head coach had a 154–78–13 (.655) record.

In addition to Bradshaw, other star athletes whom Hedges coached (with school and senior seasons listed) included punter-receiver Pat Studstill (Byrd, 1956), linebacker Bo Harris (Captain Shreve, 1970), running back Roland Harper (Shreve, 1970), receiver Carlos Pennywell (Shreve, 1973), defensive back Robert Moore (Shreve, 1981), running back Derrick Douglas (Shreve, 1985). All played in the National Football League.

Hedges' primary reputation was as a football coach, teacher of the passing game and developer of star quarterbacks, running backs and receivers, but he also was respected as a classroom teacher of mathematics and tennis coach/instructor. His Captain Shreve tennis teams won 15 state championships. He worked with young tennis players at various country clubs and organizations in Shreveport, such as Pierremont Oaks, until he was into his eighties.

== Athletic career ==
Hedges was a three-sport star (football, basketball, baseball) at Fair Park, an All-State running back in 1947 who help Fair Park run its winning streak against crosstown rival Byrd to five consecutive times in the annual Thanksgiving Day game at Louisiana State Fair Stadium in Shreveport.

Hedges then played football and baseball at LSU. He was a quarterback for a time at LSU, then switched to running back and was part of the "Cinderella" 1949 Tigers team that won its last six games and took an 8–2 record into the Sugar Bowl, a 35–0 loss to undefeated and No. 2-ranked University of Oklahoma (coached by Bud Wilkinson, quarterbacked by Darrell Royal).

An outfielder in baseball, he played two years professionally (1952–53) with the Baton Rouge Red Sticks of the Evangeline Baseball League.

Football was really what I loved more than baseball, but I played summer baseball every year... I went to a tryout camp with the Yankees in Joplin, Missouri, after my sophomore year at LSU. I had a chance to decide which one I liked the most. I chose football. I love baseball, but after you play in Tiger Stadium, there's nothing like it so I went back for my last two years at LSU.

== Coaching career ==
After a stint in the United States Army, he finished work on his degree and in 1954 helped coach the LSU freshmen in football. He then began his coaching career at Fair Park High School as an assistant to Homer Prendergast in 1955. That Fair Park team went to the state championship game and lost to Istrouma of Baton Rouge, led by running back Billy Cannon.

The next season, 1956, Hedges became head coach at Byrd at age 26 and his first team also went to the state title game. Istrouma again was the opponent and won 14–7, the fourth of Istrouma's eight state titles in a 13-year period.

After four years at Byrd (23–19–3 record), he moved to Woodlawn, then the newly established school in the southwest part of Shreveport.

Following the rough first season, most of the team returned and the "Team Named Desire" won its first six games, most of them close and with fourth-quarter heroics. The team's 9–2 regular season, district title and state playoff berth earned Hedges several "Coach of the Year" honors.

Hedges was the state's "Coach of the Year" in 1965 when Bradshaw led an almost entirely new team—with only one returning starter from the year before—to an 11–2–1 record. The district champions then won two playoff games before a 12–9 loss to Sulphur in Calcasieu Parish in the state championship game.

In his final five seasons at Woodlawn, Hedges' teams had records of 9–3, 9–2, 8–3–1, 10–2, 11–2–1 – a combined 47–12–2.

His quarterbacks included Billy Laird, second-team All-State choice, then a star at Louisiana Tech and later a prominent college and high school coach; Trey Prather, an All-State choice who played at LSU for two years; and Bradshaw.

=== College coaching ===
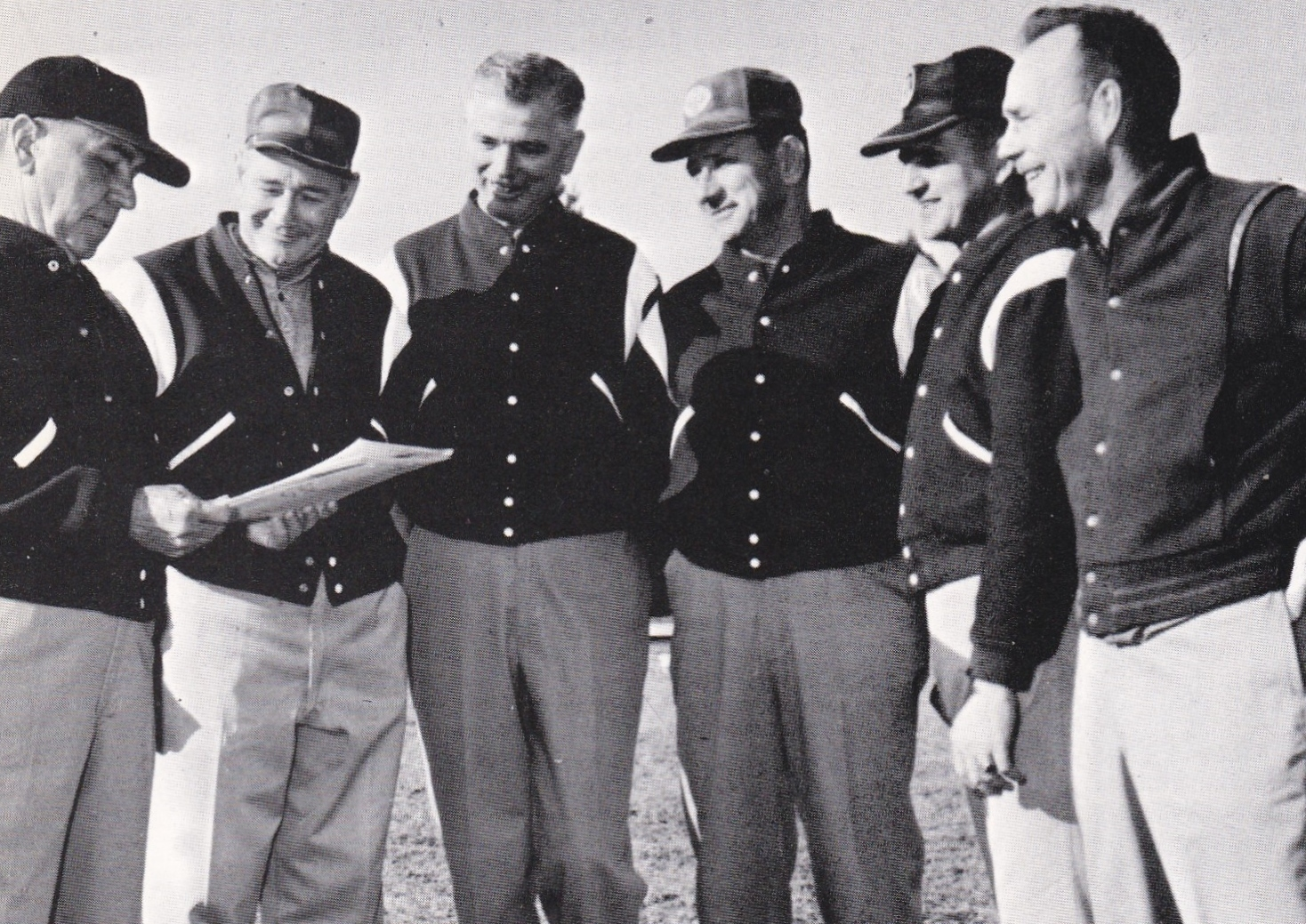
1966 Louisiana Tech University football coaches: from left, head coach Joe Aillet and assistants George Doherty, Jim Mize, A. Huey Williamson, E. J. Lewis, and Lee Hedges, who after that season returned to high school coaching at the newly opened Captain Shreve High School in Shreveport, Louisiana

After the 1965 season, Hedges resigned from the Woodlawn job and accepted a position as offensive backfield coach at Louisiana Tech University under head coach Joe Aillet. At the time, a dozen former Woodlawn players had gone on to play at Tech, where Hedges also taught physical education for the academic year 1966–67.

In the 1966 season, Tech's quarterbacks were sophomore Phil Robertson—the future "Duck Commander" of the reality television series, Duck Dynasty—and Bradshaw, a freshman. The team had the worst season (1–9 record) in Aillet's 26 years as Tech coach, and he retired from football, but remained as athletic director a couple of months after the season ended.

Hedges, in turn, returned to Shreveport to become the head coach at Captain Shreve High School, which opened in fall 1967.

=== Captain Shreve ===
In 18 seasons at Captain Shreve, Hedges' teams had a 146–52–4 (.733) record, with eight district championships (the first in 1970, the fourth year of the program). His 1971 and 1983 teams made it to the state semifinals.

=== 1973 ===
The 1973 team, with its 14–0 record and average margin of victory of 26 points, gave Hedges his only state championship and is considered one of the most talented teams in Shreveport-Bossier history. In 10 regular-season games, the team had eight shutouts and gave up a total of 15 points in two games. Their closest games were two 11-point playoff decisions. The team had five All-State selections—quarterback Joel Thomas, 2,344 yards passing and 35 touchdowns, receivers Pennywell (58 receptions—a state-record 21 for TDs—and 1,240 yards) and Rod Foppe (picked as a defensive back and 40 catches, 860 yards, 12 TDs), 1,064-yard rusher Willie B. Mosely, and linebacker Curley White, leader of the big, strong, rough defense. However, Shreve, which never trailed in a regular season game, had to come from behind to win each of their four playoff games, culminating with a 26–15 victory against Glen Oaks of Baton Rouge for the 1973 state championship.

You work so many years to get to the finals ... We went a couple of other times and it looked easier to get there. Then it was [eight] years before we made it to another final. It felt like a dream. They felt like they could win it. I wasn't always sure it would happen. I remember it very well. When you're a part of only one, it stands out in a hurry.

The 1973 team was the first of three Captain Shreve teams with perfect regular-season records. The 1974 team extended the Gators' winning streak to 24 games before falling to Southwood in the state playoffs, and the 1980 team was 10–0 in regular-season play.

== Death ==
Hedges died on July 9, 2023, at age 93.

== Recognition ==
In 1963, Hedges was chosen "Outstanding Teacher" by the Caddo Parish Teachers Association. In 1973, he was elected president of the Louisiana High School Coaches Association.

Hedges was selected for the Louisiana High School Coaches Association Hall of Fame in 1987, the Louisiana Sports Hall of Fame in 2010 in the "oldtimers" category, and the Ark-La-Tex Sports Museum of Champions, with induction ceremonies in the Shreveport Convention Hall on August 4, 2012.

== Legacy ==
A. L. Williams, part of Hedges' coaching staff at Woodlawn in the early 1960s and his successor there as head coach, describes Hedges as

...very well-organized. His practices were well-planned. We spent so many minutes on one thing, then another. He was heading all that up. He had to get four new coaches together. The four [assistants] had never coached together. He’d never coached with any of them. I can’t imagine how hard it was for him. ...

You always knew his teams would do things the right way because that's what he expected of them, and everyone around him wanted to please him so much. People wanted Lee to coach their kids because they respected him so much.

Hedges didn't want any of the accolades or credit. He always gave that to someone else. He was 100 percent sincere in that. He appreciated the people and the students and he was the one who should have a stadium named after him. The athlete always came first ... When we'd go to the high school athletic association [meetings], he would always vote for what was best for the student and what was best for the game. There were a lot of people who would vote for what would help them. He was the type of guy you want to work with and you want to be leading. He was a natural leader. He just didn't have an ego. It wasn't about what he could get.

Bo Harris remembers Hedges as:

...the master of motivation through positive reinforcement. It was a core-shaping of my athletic career. Coach Hedges knew how to do it. You wanted to please the man. You put out all the effort just to hear him say, "That a boy."

Coach Hedges made you appreciate the mental part of the game, and it became a whole different relationship for me. Every coach I had from then on, I asked questions and picked their brains. ... Back then, a lot of coaches would just try to force things down your throat. But Coach Hedges wouldn't just show you how to do something, he'd tell you why.
