= Fair Park Middle School =

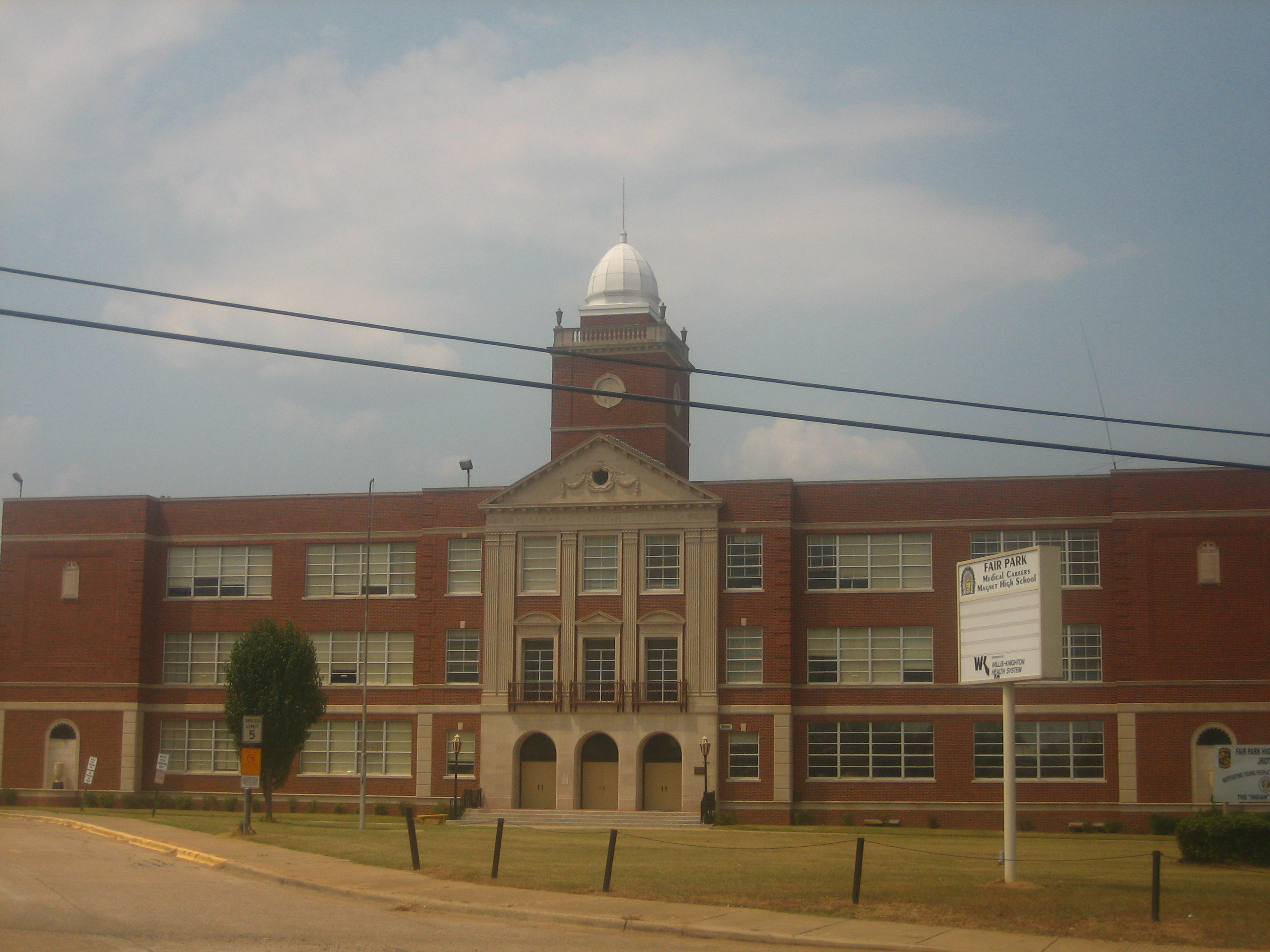
- The school in 2008 as a high school
- Location: 3222 Greenwood Road, Shreveport, Louisiana
- Coordinates: 32°28′45″N 93°47′26″W
- Area: 5 acres (2.0 ha)
- Built: 1928
- Architect: Edward F. Neild
- Architectural style: Classical Revival
- Added to NRHP: January 11, 2001

Fair Park Middle School is a former high school located at 3222 Greenwood Road in Shreveport, Louisiana, United States. The school was originally named Fair Park High School when it opened in 1928, and it was the second high school in the city. C.E. Byrd High School had opened three years earlier in 1925. The institution was also previously named Fair Park College Preparatory High School or Fair Park College Prep Academy, and additionally had been named Fair Park Medical Careers Magnet High School.

== History ==
The school was built during the local oil-driven boom of the late 1920s. The population of Shreveport increased nearly five-fold increase from 1900 to 1930; this created chronic school overcrowding. Fair Park has a three-story main section built of red brick trimmed with limestone. A wing was added in 1931. The entrance features a large pediment resting on colossal pilasters. The building was originally crowned by a three-stage tower, however, the third stage and most of the second were replaced with a small dome-like top in the 1980s. Otherwise, though the building has been further expanded, the bricks sandblasted, and the windows replaced, it would be easily recognizable to its earliest students.

From the middle 1950s until 1967, the historian Hubert D. Humphreys taught at Fair Park.

Fair Park High School was listed in the National Register of Historic Places in 2001.

In January 2017, Fair Park suddenly changed its principal after six consecutive years of "failed" ratings and continuing disciplinary problems. Three other high schools under the operation of the Caddo Parish School Board are also rated "failed". Reports persisted that the school would close or be downgraded to a middle school. Booker T. Washington carries a "C" academic rating by the Louisiana Department of Education. Fair Park was rated "D" in its final year as a high school, improving from an "F."

Meanwhile, Earnestine Coleman of the Fair Park Parent, Teacher, Student Association, said that she and fifteen others plan a class action suit under the Civil Rights Act of 1964 against the school board in a bid to halt the merger. Nevertheless, the merger proceeded, and Fair Park became officially a middle school in August 2017. Pupils from Lakeshore Middle School were transferred to Fair Park. Ten schools were converted to K-5 status.

In an eight-to-four decision, the Caddo Parish School Board voted in 2017 to merge Fair Park, with seven hundred pupils, with the historically black Booker T. Washington High School. The combined thousand students will attend the Washington campus, with Fair Park becoming a middle school. In standing room only, citizens aired their views to board members on the feasibility of the merger. The board majority claims the merger would save public funds through the combining of resources.

== Athletics ==
=== Championships ===
LHSAA Football championships

- (1) State Championship: 1952

=== Coaches ===
- Homer Prendergast, twenty-three years as head football coach and had a 154–78–13 (.655) record.
- A. L. Williams, head football coach

== Notable alumni ==
- John F. Bookout Jr. (Class of 1940), president of the Shell Oil Company
- Tim Brando (Class of 1974) CBS Sports announcer
- Roy L. Brun (Class of 1971), state district court judge and former member of the Louisiana House of Representatives
- C.L. Bryant (Class of 1974), African-American Baptist minister and radio talk show host on KEEL; a Shreveport native
- Cecil K. Carter, Jr. (1929–1987), member of the Louisiana State Senate from 1972 to 1976
- Morris Claiborne (Class of 2009) Dallas Cowboys cornerback
- “Rocket” Rod Richardson (Class of 1980) 100-Meter Dash State record holder from 1980 - 2026.
- Hollis Conway (Class of 1985) Olympian High Jumper Olympics 1988 Silver, 1992 Bronze
- Wendell Davis (Class of 1984), Louisiana State University athletics 1984–1987; consensus and SEC All American 1987, Chicago Bears 1988-1993 and Indianapolis Colts 1995 football wide receiver
- Rick Edmonds (Class of 1974), member of the Louisiana House of Representatives for East Baton Rouge Parish
- Lee Hedges, American football coach
- Robert Rochell (Class of 2016) Los Angeles Rams cornerback
- Leo Sanford (Class of 1947), Chicago Cardinals linebacker
- Stromile Swift (Class of 1998), NBA player, 2000–2009
- Pat Tilley (Class of 1971), St. Louis Cardinals football player, 1975–1986; leader of the Fellowship of Christian Athletes
- Tome H. Walters Jr. (Class of 1965), Lieutenant General, United States Air Force, 1970–2004
- A. L. Williams (Class of 1953), Fair Park and Woodlawn high school football coach; Northwestern State University and Louisiana Tech football coach
- Faron Young (Class of 1951, 1932–1996), American country music singer and songwriter from the early 1950s through the mid-1970s.
- Chi Chi DeVayne, notable contestant from American TV Show RuPaul's Drag Race (Season 8, 2016)

== See also ==
- National Register of Historic Places listings in Caddo Parish, Louisiana
