= General Walters =

General Walters may refer to:

- Glenn M. Walters (born 1957), U.S. Marine Corps four-star general
- Tome H. Walters Jr. (fl. 1960s–2000s), U.S. Air Force lieutenant general
- Vernon A. Walters (1917–2002), U.S. Army lieutenant general
