= Virginia Shehee =

American businesswoman and politician from Louisiana (1923–2015)

Member of the Louisiana Senate from the 38th district
- In office 1976–1980

Personal details
- Born: Virginia Ruth Kilpatrick; July 12, 1923 Houston, Texas, U.S.
- Died: July 6, 2015 (aged 91) Shreveport, Louisiana, U.S.
- Party: Democratic
- Spouse: William Payton Shehee Jr.
- Children: 4
- Education: Centenary College of Louisiana

Virginia Ruth Kilpatrick Shehee (1923-2015) was an American businesswoman and politician from Louisiana. A member of the Democratic Party, she was the first woman elected to the Louisiana State Senate.

== Personal life ==
Shehee was born on July 12, 1923, in Houston, Texas to Lonnie Benjamin Kilpatrick and Nell Peters. She was descended from one of the Old Three Hundred families and had a sister, Ann Shane Kilpatrick.

As a child, her family moved to Shreveport, Louisiana where he parents established two companies, the Kilpatrick Life Insurance Company and the Rose-Neath Funeral Home. While a student at C.E. Byrd High School, Shehee worked for her father at the life insurance agency. She also worked as a secretary for Jimmie Davis, the future Governor of Louisiana, with whom she became life-long friends. After high school, she attended one year at Stephens College, but her father bought her a Ford Roadster in exchange for returning home. She finished her degree at Shreveport's Centenary College of Louisiana in 1943. She majored in English and was a member of Zeta Tau Alpha. Shehee then earned a master's degree in social work from Southern Methodist University.

With her husband, John Andrew Guy, she had three children. The family first lived in Washington DC but then moved to Shreveport. She later married William Peyton Shehee, Jr. and had a daughter with him. She had several pets and loved to read.

Shehee died on July 6, 2015, at University Health Hospital in Shreveport after an illness. Her funeral was held at St. Paul's Episcopal Church in Shreveport.

== Career ==
After World War II, Shehee visited friends in Germany and was presented an opportunity to work for the American Red Cross. While working in Germany, she participated in the Berlin Airlift. After returning to Shreveport, Shehee went back to work in the family insurance agency and funeral home. While married to William Shehee, the couple built the Kilpatrick Life Insurance Company into the state's largest life insurance company. It grew to 10 offices in Texas and Louisiana by the time of her retirement.

Following her mother's unexpected death in a 1971 plane crash, Shehee took control of both companies. Under her leadership, the funeral home business grew to 12 homes and three cemeteries. In this role, she served as chairman of the Life Insurers Conference, the Louisiana Insurers' Conference, and the Louisiana Life Insurance Guarantee Association, as well as on the board of the American Council of Life Insurance.

== Political career ==
Elected in 1975 by just 23 votes over incumbent C. Kay Carter, Shehee became the first woman elected to the Louisiana State Senate. A member of the Democratic Party, she served the 38th District (Caddo and DeSoto Parishes) from 1976 to 1980. She was a member of the Judicial Council of the Louisiana Supreme Court.

She sponsored legislation that made You Are My Sunshine the official state song. The song was written by her friend, Governor Jimmie Davis.

== Civic life ==
Shehee served as a trustee at her alma mater, Centenary College, and helped to establish the Kilpatrick Auditorium and Shehee Stadium there. She helped to save the Strand Theatre from demolition and raised funds to restore it. As a member of St. Paul's Episcopal Church, she was elected the first female senior warden. She was also elected a fellow of the Royal Society of Arts.

A staunch supporter of education, she served on the higher education transition team for Governors Buddy Roemer and Mike Foster. She also co-chaired Governor Bobby Jindal's transition committee on ethics and chaired the Southfield School Book Fair.

She also served on a number of boards, including

- the Biomedical Research Foundation of Northwest Louisiana
- the State Fair of Louisiana
- Community Renewal International
- the Shreveport Symphony Orchestra
- the Shreveport Committee of 100
- the Louisiana Committee of 100 for Economic Development
- the National D-Day Museum
- Southfield School Foundation
- Centenary College of Louisiana (life member)
- Louisiana State University
- Louisiana Governor's Mansion Foundation

== Honors ==
The Kilpatrick Life Insurance Company Endowed Chair for Insurance and Financial Service at Louisiana State University Shreveport was established in her honor by those in the state's insurance industry. In addition to becoming one of the first female members of the Rotary Club of Shreveport, she was awarded a Paul Harris Fellowship by the club. The Virginia Shehee Service Award was established in her name by the Southern Hills Business Association.

Centenary College and Northwestern State University both awarded her honorary doctorates. She was named a "Sweatheart for life" by the Tau Kappa Epsilon fraternity. Louisiana State University Shreveport declared her to be a Distinguished Business Executive on Campus. The Biomedical Research Institute at the LSU Health Sciences Center Shreveport was named for Shehee.

She was inducted into the Centenary College of Louisiana Alumni Hall of Fame, the C.E. Byrd High School Hall of Fame, (Note: She was one of the first five members.) the Louisiana State University Shreveport's Women in Government Hall of Fame, the North Louisiana Business Hall of Fame as a business laureate, and the Louisiana Political Hall of Fame.

Pope John Paul II awarded her the Benemerenti Medal. Other awards include the Shreveport Medical Society award for Outstanding Contribution to the Advancement of Medicine, the Clyde E. Fant Memorial Award for Community Service, the Liberty Bell Award from Shreveport Bar Association, the Arthritis Foundation Award, the Patron of Architecture from Louisiana Architecture Foundation the "Pilot of the Year" of LSUS, and the Philanthropy, Volunteerism, and Community Leadership Award from Louisiana Association of Non-Profit Organizations. Shehee was the first woman to be named "Mr. Shreveport" by the Optimist Club. She received the Distinguished Sales Award from Sales & Marketing Executives of Shreveport/Bossier, the Rotary Club of Shreveport's Service Above Self Award.

The March of Dimes named her the Citizen of the Year, and she also won the Samaritan Counseling Center's Samaritan Award, and the Shreveport Chamber of Commerce's Business Leader of the Year award, where she was the first female recipient. The Volunteers of America gave her the Light House Award, Gardens of the American Rose Society bestowed their Mary Johnston Award for Outstanding Service upon her, and Louisiana Public Broadcasting named her a Louisiana Legend.
