= Milam Street Trade School =

School in Shreveport, Louisiana (1939–1955)

Location
- 2115 Milam Street, Shreveport, Louisiana, U.S. 32.503444°N 93.774125°W

Information
- Other name: Milam Street Training School, Special High School for Colored Veterans
- Founded: April 2, 1939
- Closed: May 1955

The Milam Street Trade School (1939–1955) was a vocational school at the high school-level for African American students in Shreveport, Louisiana. It was located across the street from Booker T. Washington High School. It was also known as Milam Street Training School. The campus contained the Special High School for Colored Veterans after World War II.

== History ==
The Milam Street Trade School started as an experiment by the Caddo Public Schools to teach local African American students vocational skills before graduating high school, funded by the Works Progress Administration (WPA). The program typically it lasted one year and was during the 10th grade. The founding principal was Albert G. Davis. Many of the students in attendance came from Central High School and, when the Booker T. Washington High School opened in 1950, it was across the street from the Milam Street Trade School.

Courses taught at the school included home economics, beauty, shoe repair, carpentry, rug weaving, horticulture, maid-training, mattress-making, and shade-making. Later they added tailoring courses, and leatherwork. Part of the financial support of the school came from the sales of student projects. They had sports teams, including basketball.

== Special High School for Colored Veterans ==
During World War II, many of the male students were taken out of classes, but under the newly formed G.I. Bill of Rights in 1944, they were able to finish their schooling. A new school was formed called the "Special High School for Colored Veterans" for veteran students in 1946, and it was located on the same campus. It was designed to complete high school work within eighteen months, or alternatively take the GED after 8 months.

Dan L. Smith served as the principal, he was a United States Army veteran and had been an instructor of manual training at Central High School in Shreveport. It closed in May 1955. It had roughly 30 graduates per year, and only one female graduate.
