= Thomas McLemore =

American football player (born 1970)

No. 82, 80, 81
- Position: Tight end

Personal information
- Born: March 14, 1970 (age 56); Shreveport, Louisiana, U.S.
- Listed height: 6 ft 5 in (1.96 m)
- Listed weight: 245 lb (111 kg)

Career information
- High school: Huntington (Shreveport)
- College: Southern
- NFL draft: 1992: 3rd round, 81st overall pick

Career history
- Detroit Lions (1992); Cleveland Browns (1993–1994); Indianapolis Colts (1995)

Career NFL statistics
- Receptions: 2
- Receiving yards: 12
- Stats at Pro Football Reference

Thomas Tyree McLemore (born March 14, 1970) is an American former professional football player who was a tight end for four seasons in the National Football League (NFL) for the Detroit Lions, Cleveland Browns, and Indianapolis Colts. He played college football for Southern and was a third-round pick of the Lions in the 1992 NFL draft.

== Early life and education ==
A native of Shreveport, Louisiana, McLemore attended Huntington High School there, playing football and basketball. After graduating in 1988, McLemore joined Southern University in Baton Rouge, spending his first season as a redshirt. In 1990, he was called as a marine reserve during the Gulf War with Iraq, though he did not go overseas. Upon returning to Southern later in the year, McLemore lost his starting tight end role. He shared the starting position in his senior year of 1991, but only caught 15 passes for 151 yards.

== Professional career ==
Though not invited to the NFL Combine, McLemore was selected in the third round (81st overall) of the 1992 NFL draft by the Detroit Lions. The Lions gained interest in McLemore after a tryout, in which, he ran a 40-yard dash in 4.43 seconds. He was placed on injured reserve on September 1, 1992, and activated on October 8. Overall, as a rookie, he appeared in eleven games, starting one, and made two catches for 12 yards on four targets. He was released by the Lions at roster cuts in 1993.

After being released by Detroit, McLemore signed with the Cleveland Browns. He appeared in the first four games before going on the inactive list, eventually being released on October 21. He was re-signed a week later, but did not play for the rest of the year. He returned to Cleveland in 1994, playing two games and starting one during the year.

He was released by the Browns at roster cuts in 1995, and subsequently signed to the Indianapolis Colts. He transitioned to the defensive end position during preseason, but later reverted to tight end. He appeared in one regular season game before being placed on the non-football injury reserve list, after accidentally shooting himself in the foot. He was later released, ending his professional career.
