= Robert W. Kostelka =

American judge and politician (1933–2026)

- Kostelka in 2018

Judge of the Louisiana Court of Appeal for the Second Circuit
- In office 1998–2003

Member of the Louisiana State Senate
- In office 2004–2016

Personal details
- Born: Robert William Kostelka; February 18, 1933 Shreveport, Louisiana, U.S.
- Died: January 10, 2026 (aged 92) Monroe, Louisiana, U.S.
- Party: Republican
- Spouse(s): Bobbie Ann Morales (m. 1957; died. 1983) Felicia Marie Danna
- Education: Louisiana State University School of Law
- Occupation: Judge

Robert William Kostelka (February 18, 1933 – January 10, 2026) was an American judge and politician. A member of the Republican Party, he served as judge of the Louisiana Court of Appeal for the Second Circuit from 1998 to 2003 and in the Louisiana State Senate from 2004 to 2016.

== Early life and career ==
Kostelka was born in Shreveport, Louisiana, the son of William and Lillian Kostelka. He attended C. E. Byrd High School, graduating in 1951. After graduating, he attended Louisiana State University School of Law, earning his JD degree in 1957, which after earning his degree, he completed his training for prosecuting attorneys at Northwestern University School of Law.

In 1992, President George H. W. Bush nominated Kostelka to serve as district judge of the United States District Court for the Western District of Louisiana. His nomination was unsuccessful after Bush was not re-elected as president. After his unsuccessful nomination, he served as judge of the Louisiana Court of Appeal for the Second Circuit from 1998 to 2003, which after his service as judge, he served in the Louisiana State Senate from 2004 to 2016.

In 2022, Kostelka was inducted into the Louisiana Political Museum and Hall of Fame.

== Personal life and death ==
In 1957, Kostelka married Bobbie Ann Morales. Their marriage lasted until her death in 1983. He was then married to Felicia Marie Danna. Their marriage lasted until Kostelka's death in 2026.

Kostelka died in Monroe, Louisiana, on January 10, 2026, at the age of 92.
