= Art Sour =

American politician

Arthur William "Art" Sour Jr.

Louisiana State Representative for District 6 (Shreveport)
- In office 1972–1992
- Preceded by: Frank Fulco
- Succeeded by: Melissa Flournoy

Personal details
- Born: November 6, 1924 Shreveport, Louisiana, US
- Died: January 10, 2000 (aged 75)
- Resting place: Forest Park East Cemetery in Shreveport
- Party: Republican
- Spouse: Mary Margaret Hodge Sour
- Children: 3
- Education: C. E. Byrd High School

Military service
- Branch/service: United States Army
- Battles/wars: World War II

Arthur William Sour Jr., known as Art Sour (November 26, 1924 – January 10, 2000), was a petroleum and real estate businessman, who was a pioneer in the development of a competitive Republican Party in his native U.S. state of Louisiana.

== Family ==
One of Sour's sisters, Louise Pasquier, the widow of Charles F. Pasquier, Sr., was among the founders of St. Joseph Catholic Church in Shreveport.

Political offices
| Preceded by Frank Fulco, Sr. (then part of a seven-member at-large delegation) | Louisiana State Representative for District 6 (Shreveport); 1972–1992 | Succeeded by Melissa Flournoy |
