= Huntington High School (Shreveport, Louisiana) =

High school in Louisiana, United States

Coordinates: 32.4477°N 93.8565°W

Huntington High School (HHS)
- 6801 Rasberry Ln.

Information
- Type: Public
- Motto: We Can, We Will
- Established: 1973
- School board: Caddo Parish School Board
- Principal: Nicholaus Smith
- Teaching staff: 75.12 (on an FTE basis)
- Grades: 9–12
- Enrollment: 1,383 (2023-24)
- Student to teacher ratio: 18.41
- Colors: Navy, silver, white
- Athletics conference: District 1-4A
- Mascot: Raider
- Nickname: Raiders
- Website: huntington.caddoschools.org

Huntington High School (originally Huntington School of Excellence) is a public high school located at 6801 Rasberry Lane in the Pines Road area of West Shreveport, Louisiana, United States. Established in 1972, it includes grades 9-12. It is a part of Caddo Public Schools, and also has a magnet program.

== Athletics ==
Huntington High Raider athletics compete in the LHSAA District 1-4A.

- Football
- Basketball
- Track
- Baseball
- Softball
- Soccer
- Cross country
- Volleyball

Championships

The Huntington High Raider boys' track team finished as the LHSAA 4A State Runner Up in 2012. The team has qualified various times and has had individual State Championship winners in track as well.

The girls' track team were the 2023 Louisiana High School Athletic Association Outdoor State Champions. They finished third overall in 2022.

The boys' and girls' basketball teams have also had numerous LHSAA Top 28 appearances. The girls' team appeared in State Championships in 1995 and 2021.

== Notable alumni ==
- Albert Belle, MLB player
- Kenny Davidson, NFL player
- Troy Edwards, NFL player
- Hurricane Chris, rapper
- Thomas McLemore, NFL player
- Michael Qualls, professional basketball player
