= Woodlawn Leadership Academy =

Location
- 7340 Wyngate Blvd. Shreveport, (Caddo Parish), Louisiana 71106; United States; 32.436082°N 93.775318°W

Information
- Type: Public
- Established: 1960
- School district: Caddo Parish School Board
- Teaching staff: 51.50 (FTE)
- Grades: 9–12
- Enrollment: 789 (2023–2024)
- Student to teacher ratio: 15.32
- Colors: Royal Blue and Scarlet
- Athletics conference: LHSAA District 1-4A
- Mascot: Knight
- Nickname: Knights
- Yearbook: Accolade
- Website: https://woodlawn.caddoschools.org/

Woodlawn Leadership Academy, formerly Woodlawn High School, is a public senior high school in Shreveport, Louisiana, United States, and a part of the Caddo Parish Public Schools.

== History ==
The contract for construction of Woodlawn High was given to W. A. McMichael Construction Company in August 1958 with the final cost of construction in 1960 being $2,660,300. The school opened in September 1960 with 1,000 students. Woodlawn High School and the Caddo Parish School Board began integrating during the 1969–70 school year.

== Athletics ==
=== Woodlawn Leadership Academy athletics ===
Woodlawn Leadership Academy athletics competes in the LHSAA.

Sports offered:

- Football
- Baseball
- Boys' Basketball
- Girls' Basketball
- Cross-Country
- Golf
- Softball
- Tennis
- Boys' Track and Field
- Girls' Track and Field
- Volleyball
- Cheerleaders

=== Woodlawn High School Athletics history ===
==== Championships ====
Football championships

- (1) State Championships: 1968 (Class 3A)
- (1) State Runners-Up: 1965 (Class 3A)

Boys' Basketball championships

- (1) State Championships: 1972 (Class 4A)

==== Notable players ====
Woodlawn High School produced players that played in the "Big 3" of U.S. professional sports that are Major League Baseball, the National Basketball Association, and the National Football League. The school has multiple players inducted into professional sports halls-of-fame with players inducted into both the Naismith Memorial Basketball Hall of Fame and Pro Football Hall of Fame.

- Terry Bradshaw, NFL Hall of Fame member, sports analyst and actor. (NFL League MVP and two-time Super Bowl MVP)
- Joe Ferguson, NFL player and hall of fame member. (NFL League passing and touchdowns leader, multiple seasons)
- Lawrence Hart, NFL player
- Shawn Jeter, MLB player
- Vic Minor, NFL player
- Robert Parish, NBA Hall of Fame member. (Nine-time NBA All-Star)

=== Notable coaches ===
- Lee Hedges, football
- Ken Ivy, boys' basketball
- A. L. Williams, football

== Notable people ==
=== Woodlawn Leadership Academy ===
- Henry Black, NFL player
- Donovan Wilson, NFL player
