= Joe Scott (1940s first baseman) =

American baseball player

- First baseman
- Born: June 15, 1918; Shreveport, Louisiana, U.S.
- Died: January 12, 1997 (aged 78); Los Angeles, California, U.S.
- Batted: Left Threw: Left

Negro league baseball debut
- 1946, for the Los Angeles White Sox

Last appearance
- 1948, for the Birmingham Black Barons

Teams
- Los Angeles White Sox (1946); Birmingham Black Barons (1948)

Joseph Scott (June 15, 1918 – January 12, 1997) was an American Negro league first baseman in the 1940s.

A native of Shreveport, Louisiana, Scott graduated from Central High School. He made his Negro leagues debut in 1946 with the Los Angeles White Sox. He played for the Birmingham Black Barons in 1948, recording a hit and an RBI in three plate appearances for Birmingham during the 1948 Negro World Series. Scott went on to play minor league baseball in the 1950s for several teams, including the Farnham Pirates, St. Hyacinthe Saints, and Hot Springs Bathers. He died in Los Angeles, California in 1997 at age 78.
