= Charley Granger =

American football player (born 1938)

No. 71, 73
- Position: Offensive tackle

Personal information
- Born: August 9, 1938 (age 88); Lake Charles, Louisiana, U.S.
- Listed height: 6 ft 2 in (1.88 m)
- Listed weight: 240 lb (109 kg)

Career information
- High school: Booker T. Washington
- College: Southern
- AFL draft: 1961: 26th round, 203rd overall pick

Career history
- Dallas Cowboys (1961); St. Louis Cardinals (1961)

Awards and highlights
- 2× All-SWAC (1959, 1960); 2× Track All-SWAC (1959, 1960)

Career statistics
- Games played: 14
- Stats at Pro Football Reference

Charles Granger (born August 9, 1938) is an American former professional football player who was an offensive tackle in the National Football League (NFL) for the Dallas Cowboys and St. Louis Cardinals. He played college football for the Southern Jaguars.

== Early life ==
Granger attended Booker T. Washington High School. He accepted a football scholarship from Southern University.

As a sophomore, he became a starter as a two-way lineman midway through the season. As a senior, he contributed to the team winning the 1960 Black College National Championship. In track, he competed in the shot put and discus throw.

In 2010, he was inducted into the Southwestern Athletic Conference Hall of Fame. In 2011, he was inducted into the Southern University Sports Hall of Fame.

== Professional career ==
Granger was selected by the Boston Patriots in 26th round (203rd overall) of the 1961 AFL draft. In July, he signed as an undrafted free agent with the Dallas Cowboys in the National Football League. He appeared in 8 games with 7 starts at right tackle.

In November 1961, he was acquired by the St. Louis Cardinals. He appeared in 6 games with one start. He was released in 1962.

== Personal life ==
After leaving the National Football League, he was a head coach and general manager of the semi-professional football teams Baton Rouge Red Wings and the Baton Rouge Golden Eagles. He had a 28–4 winning record and won three Dixie Football League championships in four seasons.
