= Jeffrey D. Sadow =

American journalist

Jeffrey Dennis Sadow

Personal details
- Born: June 24, 1962 (age 64) Place of birth missing
- Party: Republican
- Spouse: Deshae Elizabeth Lott Sadow
- Children: No children
- Parent(s): Ronald Dennis and Helen Veronica Haddock Sadow
- Education: University of Oklahoma Vanderbilt University University of New Orleans
- Occupation: Political science professor at Louisiana State University in Shreveport

Jeffrey Dennis Sadow (born June 24, 1962) is an associate professor of political science at Louisiana State University in Shreveport known for his Internet writings on behalf of political conservatism and the Republican Party in Louisiana.

== Academic background ==
Sadow holds degrees from the University of Oklahoma at Norman, Oklahoma, Vanderbilt University in Nashville, Tennessee, and the University of New Orleans.

After a stint at the University of Illinois at Springfield, he joined the LSUS faculty in Shreveport in 1991.

== Political writings ==
On October 21, 1995, Sadow ran for a Shreveport seat on the Caddo Parish Commission. Sadow lost to another Republican, John P. Escude, 4,697 votes (56.4 percent) to 3,628 (43.6 percent).

In 2009, The Washington Post's "The Fix" blog included Sadow's blog as "one of the best state political blogs" in Louisiana as voted by readers. Sadow has been particularly critical of Democrats, such as former President Barack Obama, former Senator Mary Landrieu, and her brother, former Lieutenant Governor and former mayor of New Orleans Mitch Landrieu. Sadow said that Mitch Landrieu "promotes partisanship over policy" and seeks to undermine the Jindal administration.

Relevant to Louisiana politics was a contribution to the online political science journal The Forum concerning the factors behind the 2003 governor's contest.

Sadow supported the reelection of Senator David Vitter in 2010 and Vitter's unsuccessful gubernatorial candidacy in 2015. He has often defended the administration of Republican former Governor Bobby Jindal, although has been critical of Jindal on matters such as education reform, corporate welfare, and spending.

In the case of Little v. Llano, Llano County, Texas library patrons filed a lawsuit after seventeen books on topics such as race, gender, and children's books featuring flatulence were removed from the library following complaints that they were "obscene" or "pornographic." The 5th Circuit Court of Appeals ruled that the First Amendment does not acknowledge a right to receive information. Sadow agreed with the Supreme Court's decision in December 2025 to decline hearing an appeal for the case, criticizing those who describe the ruling as "book banning." He argued that removing books from public libraries is not a First Amendment issue, that public libraries should not spend public dollars on books the library commission finds "unworthy," and that if people in a jurisdiction want particular books, they should elect officials who would select books they prefer. He further stated that library boards should review their catalogs to determine which books do not belong in their library.
