= Central High School (Shreveport, Louisiana) =

School in Shreveport, Louisiana (1917–1949)

- U.S. National Register of Historic Places
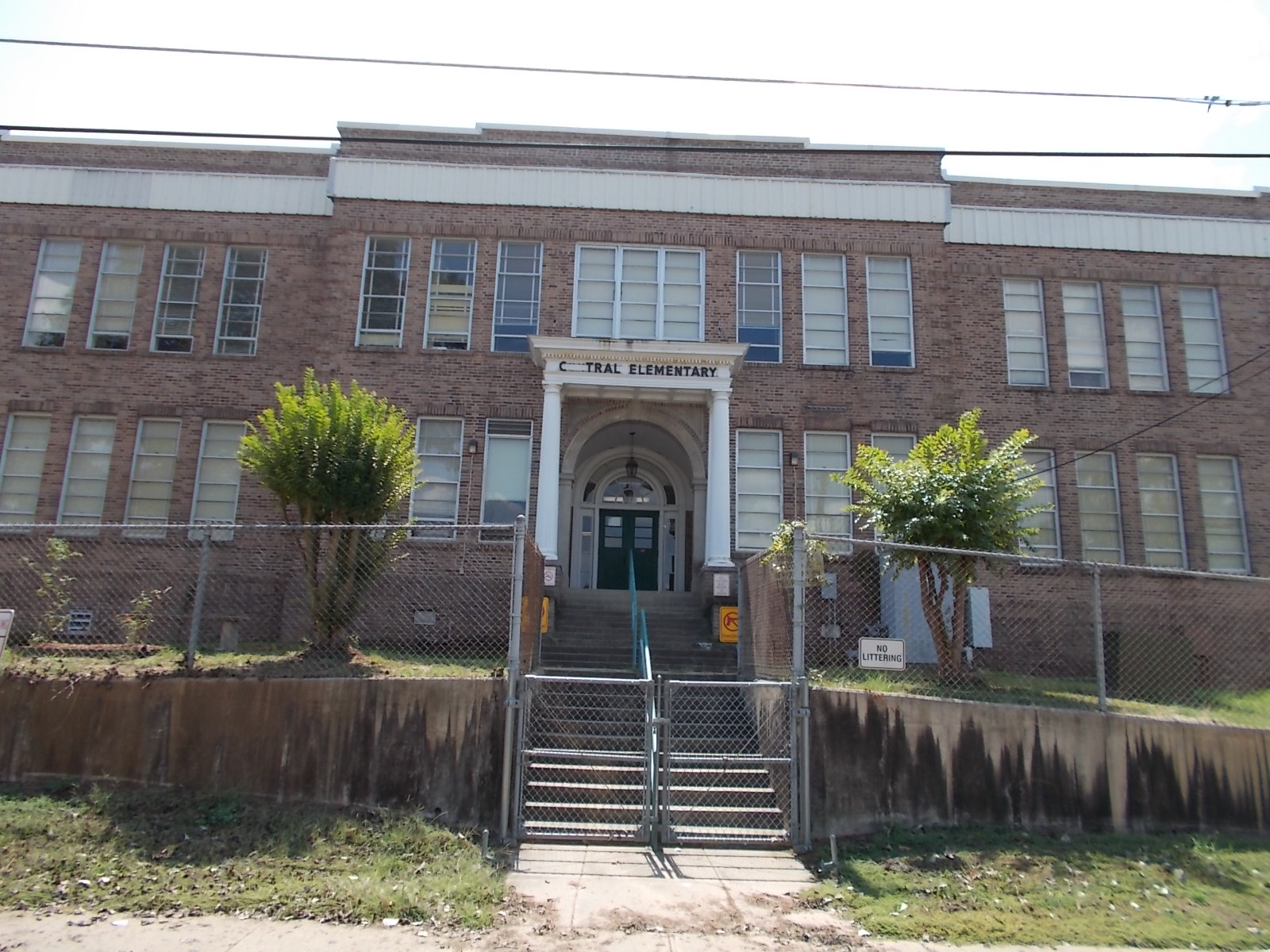

- Location within Louisiana
- Location: 1627 Weinstock St., Shreveport, Louisiana, U.S.
- Coordinates: 32°30′01″N 93°45′51″W
- Area: 3.8 acres (1.5 ha)
- Built: 1917
- Architectural style: Colonial Revival
- NRHP reference No.: 91000606
- Added to NRHP: May 16, 1991

Central High School, later known as Central Colored School, (1917–1949) was a public high school for African American students in Shreveport, Louisiana. It was the first and the only public high school for African American students in the city of Shreveport during its years of operations, 1917 until 1949. It was also known as Central Colored High School; and became Central Middle School and later Central Elementary School. The school building at 1627 Weinstock Street has been listed on the National Register of Historic Places since 1991; and a historical marker erected by the Shreveport–Bossier Convention and Tourist Bureau commemorates its history.

== History ==
During its years of operations, from 1917 until 1949, Central High School was the first and the only public high school for African American students in the city of Shreveport. The campus was a complex of four buildings, of which three were historic and contributing properties: the "Main Building" (Caddo Hall; 1917), Brown Hall (1926), and "The Auditorium" (1939). The founding principal was R. E. Brown, who was the highest paid teacher in Northern Louisiana at the time. He died March 4, 1965.

It began operations as a school that took in transfers from Peabody High School, which only offered classes up to grades 8 and 9. Courses at Central included English, mathematics, geography and history. Many of the early students came from rural surrounding areas, and boarded locally in the city with friends or family.

The first teacher training classes at the school started in 1923, and continued until 1930. In the 1920s, students from Central High School raised funds and donated money to two local community funded sites for the elderly African American community, the Colored Pines (1926) and the Amanda Clark Memorial Home For Aged Negroes. The school mascot was the Lion, starting in 1926.

Milam Street Trade School opened in 1939 and offered vocational school at the high school-level for Black students, typically in the 10th grade. Many of the Central High School students also attended Milam Street Trade School.

Raleigh H. Brown became the school principal in 1944, and served in that role until 1950. He went on to lead Booker T. Washington High School as its first principal and for another 18 years including through integration and desegregation. Brown died July 25, 1985.

When the school was closed in 1950, students were sent to the newly built Booker T. Washington High School. That same year in 1950, the Central High School campus became a middle school, with Ernest Miller as principal.

In 1996 a book about the school was published.

== Alumni ==
- Lenton Malry (class of 1947), educator and state legislator in New Mexico
- Joe Scott (attended in the 1930s), baseball player

== See also ==
- National Register of Historic Places listings in Caddo Parish, Louisiana
