= Green Oaks High School =

Green Oaks Performing Arts Academy

Location
- 2550 Thomas E. Howard Dr. Shreveport, Louisiana 71107; United States; 32.555412°N 93.814306°W

Information
- Former names: Green Oaks High School; Green Oaks Performing Arts Magnet High School
- NCES School ID: 220030000163
- Principal: Joseph Anderson
- Faculty: 30.85 (FTE)
- Grades: 9–12
- Enrollment: 351 (2023-2024)
- Student to teacher ratio: 11.38
- Colors: Green and gold
- Mascot: Giants
- Website: greenoaks.caddoschools.org

Green Oaks Performing Arts Academy is a high school for Junior high grades 7–8, and high school grades 9–12, founded in August, 1971 in Shreveport, Louisiana, United States.

== History ==
Due to a fast-growing local population, Shreveport's only high schools for black students prior to Green Oaks, the Linear Junior-Senior High School and Booker T. Washington High School, had become overcrowded by 1967. The Caddo Parish School Board, which has sole control over public schools in Shreveport thus purchased an 80-acre (320,000 m^{2}) site eight miles (13 km) north of downtown Shreveport to construct a new $2.5 million school that became Green Oaks. The school opened in 1971 with a student body of 1,260 students.

Green Oaks became a magnet school in the late 1980s adding performing arts and a teaching magnet program. The teaching program was moved to the Caddo Career & Technology Center in the late 2000s. The Performing Arts magnet program was eliminated under the 2009 Caddo Plan, which called for Green Oaks to be reconstituted as a junior/senior high school with a school-wide emphasis on performing arts. This plan was submitted as part of a plan to save the school from potential takeover. Its feeder school, the former Linear Middle School, was part of the State Recovery School District from 2009 until its closure in 2014. The current Linear campus is occupied by Northside Elementary School.

== Athletics ==
Green Oaks High athletics competes in the LHSAA.

== Notable alumni ==
- Ezra Johnson, former NFL player
- L'Damian Washington, former NFL player
- Tre'Davious White, NFL player
