= Captain Shreve High School =

Location
- 6115 East Kings Highway; Shreveport, LA 71105-4699; United States; 32°26′53″N 93°42′45″W

Information
- Type: Public
- Established: 1967; 59 years ago
- School district: Caddo Public Schools
- Principal: Robert Silvie
- Teaching staff: 88.99 (on an FTE basis)
- Enrollment: 1,845 (2023–2024)
- Student to teacher ratio: 20.73
- Colors: Forest green and gold
- Athletics conference: District 1-5A
- Mascot: Alligator
- Nickname: Gators
- Website: captainshreve.caddoschools.org

Captain Shreve High School (CSHS) is a public high school in Shreveport, Louisiana, United States. Opened in the fall of 1967, the school was named for Captain Henry Miller Shreve, who was responsible for clearing the log jam on the Red River, which led to the founding of Shreveport in 1835. Captain Shreve has the second largest enrollment of high schools in the Caddo Public Schools district with an enrollment of over 1,635 students (2018-19 school year).

== History ==
In May 1968, 137 members of the first graduating class of Captain Shreve High School received diplomas at Shreveport Civic Center.

African American students attended Eden Gardens High School in Shreveport (List of former high schools in Louisiana). Trojans were the school's mascot. It was integrated into Captain Shreve High School.

In 1984 the schools recognized as one of only two Blue Ribbon Schools in Louisiana by U.S. president Ronald Reagan. The designation recognizes schools whose students have thrived and excelled and highlights outstanding models of school leadership. In May 2017 May, the National Association of Student Councils recognized Captain Shreve High School's student council as a Gold Council of Excellence for the 10th straight year.

== Athletics ==
Captain Shreve High athletics competes in the LHSAA.

=== Championships ===
Football Championships

- (1) State Championship: 1973 (Class 4A)

Baseball Championships

- (1) State Championship: 2006 (Class 4A)

Boys' Basketball Championships

- (1) State Runners-up: 1970 (Class 3A)
- (1) District Championship: 2021

Girls' Basketball Championships

- (1) District Championship: 2017

Boys' Golf Championships

- (5) State Championship: 1970 (Class 3A), 1971 (Class 3A), 1982 (Class 4A), 1987 (Class 4A), 2003 (Class 5A)

Tennis Championships

- 1970 – Gators tie with Byrd HS for State Tennis Championship (team)
- 1971 – Gators win State Tennis Championship (team 2nd, girls singles, mixed doubles)
- 1974 – Gators win State Tennis Championship (girls team, girls singles, girls doubles)
- 1975 – Gators win State Tennis Championship (girls team 2nd, boys team, girls singles, boys singles, girls doubles, mixed doubles)
- 1976 – Gators win State Tennis Championship (girls team 3rd, girls singles, boys singles, mixed doubles)
- 1977 – Gators win State Tennis Championship (girls team 4th, girls singles, girls doubles)
- 1978 – Gators win State Tennis Championship (girls team 5th, girls singles, girls doubles, boys doubles, mixed doubles)
- 1979 – Gators win State Tennis Championship (girls team 6th, girls singles, girls doubles, mixed doubles)
- 1980 – Gators win State Tennis Championship (girls team 7th, girls singles, girls doubles)
- 1984 – Gators win State Tennis Championship (girls team 8th, boys team 2nd)
- 1985 – Gators win State Tennis Championship (girls team 9th)
- 1986 – Gators win State Tennis Championship (girls team 10th)
- 1990 – Gators win State Tennis Championship (boys team 3rd)
- 1991 – Gators win State Tennis Championship (boys team 4th)
- 1993 – Gators win State Tennis Championship (boys team 5th)
- 2002 – Gators win State Tennis Championship (boys team 6th)

=== Coaches ===
- Lee Hedges, eighteen seasons at Captain Shreve as head football coach and Hedges' teams had a 146–52–4 (.733) record, with eight district championships. The Gators' football stadium, also used by other Shreveport schools for their home games, is named for him.

== Notable alumni ==
- Ken Anderson, NFL defensive lineman for the Chicago Bears in 1998 and 1999
- Scott Baker, MLB pitcher
- Greg Barro, member of the Louisiana State Senate
- LaMark Carter, Olympic athlete in the triple jump (2000, Sydney)
- Charlie Cook, founder of The Cook Political Report
- Adam Hamilton, music producer, songwriter, and session drummer and guitarist; member of L.A. Guns
- Roland Harper, NFL running back for the Chicago Bears
- Bo Harris, NFL linebacker for the Cincinnati Bengals
- Mike Johnson, Congressman, 56th Speaker of the United States House of Representatives
- Kendrick Law, wide receiver for the Alabama Crimson Tide
- Kay McDaniel, tennis player; member of the Southern Tennis Hall of Fame
- Robert Moore, NFL defensive back for the Atlanta Falcons
- Carlos Pennywell, NFL wide receiver who played for the New England Patriots
- Robert Pennywell, NFL and USFL linebacker who played for the Atlanta Falcons and the Michigan Panthers
- Adrian Perkins, former mayor of Shreveport
- Tammy Phelps, member of the Louisiana House of Representatives
- Alan Seabaugh, attorney and member of the Louisiana House of Representatives
- Sean West, MLB pitcher for the Miami Marlins
- Victoria Williams, folk singer and founder of the Sweet Relief Musicians Fund
