= Caddo Public Schools (Louisiana) =

Louisiana school district

Location
- Shreveport, Louisiana, United States

District information
- Type: School district
- Established: 1907
- Superintendent: Keith Burton

Other information
- Website: Caddo Public Schools

Caddo Public Schools is a school district based in Shreveport, Louisiana, United States. The district serves all of Caddo Parish.

== History ==
In 1967, the board was sued by Shreveport pastor and civil rights leader E. Edward Jones and his wife, Leslie, to compel, successfully, the desegregation of Caddo Parish public schools.

== Schools ==
=== Secondary schools ===
==== High schools ====
- Booker T. Washington High School
- C.E. Byrd High School
- Caddo Magnet High School
- Captain Shreve High School
- Green Oaks High School
- Huntington High School
- North Caddo High School (Vivian, Louisiana)
- Northwood High School
- Southwood High School
- Woodlawn Leadership Academy

==== Middle schools ====
- Caddo Middle Career & Technology School (formerly Hollywood Middle School)
- Caddo Parish Middle Magnet School
- Donnie Bickham Middle School
- Fair Park Middle School (formerly Fair Park High School. Opened Fall 2017 as Middle School)
- Linear/Northside Middle School
- Ridgewood Middle School
- Youree Drive Middle AP Magnet School

=== Elementary/middle Schools ===
- Broadmoor STEM Academy (K-8) (Broadmoor Middle Lab merged with Arthur Circle Elementary in 2020.)
- Herndon Magnet School (K-8)
- J.S. Clark Elementary/6th Grade Academy (PreK-6)
- Keithville Elementary/Middle School (PreK-8)
- North Caddo Elementary/Middle Magnet School (PreK-8) (Vivian Campus - consolidated w/ Oil City Magnet in 2016)
- Turner Elementary/6th Grade Academy (PreK-6)
- Walnut Hill Elementary/Middle School (PreK-8)

=== Elementary schools ===
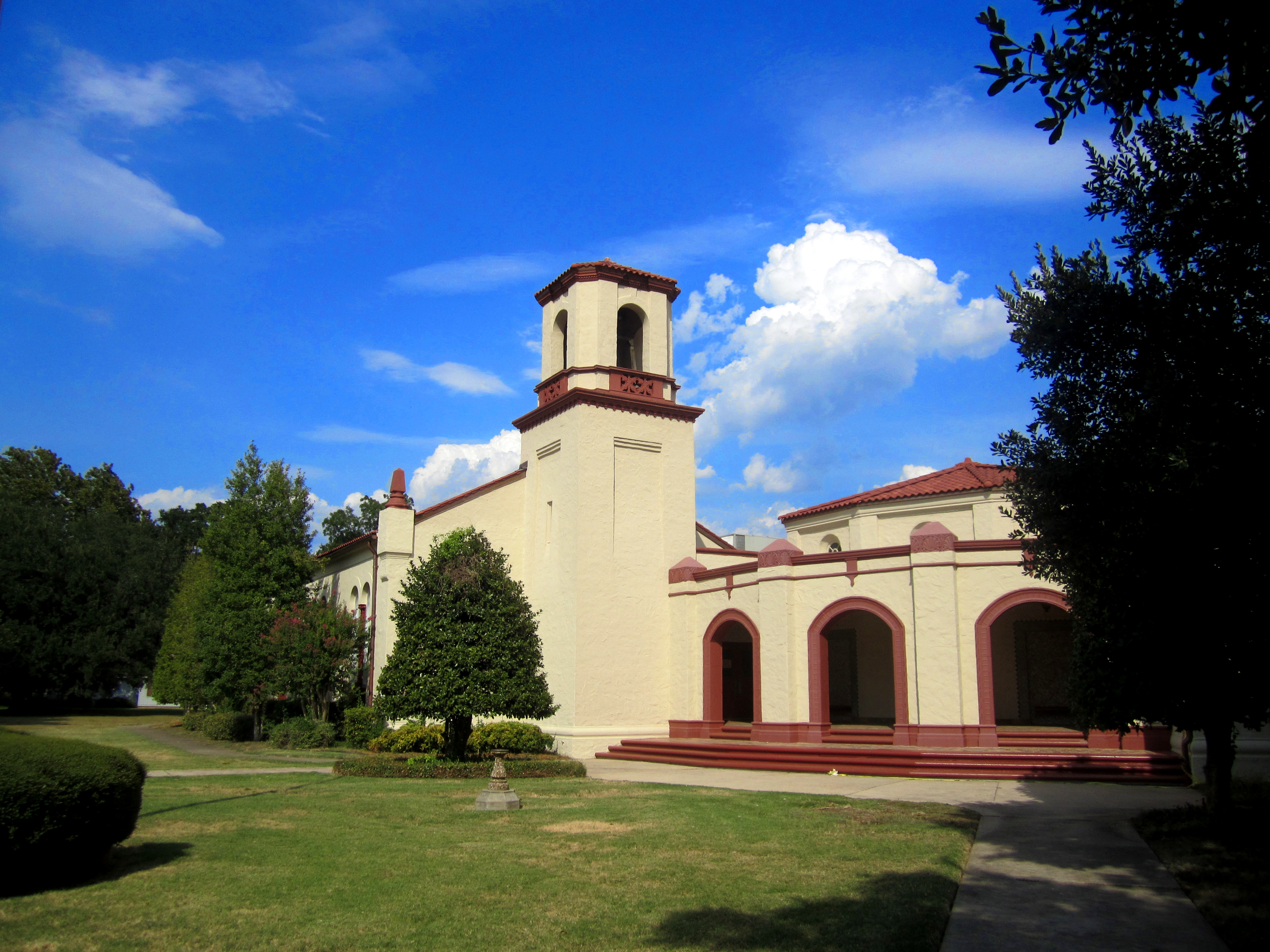
A.C. Steere Elementary School on Youree Drive in Shreveport is built in Mediterranean-style architecture.

- A. C. Steere Elementary School (PreK-5)
- Atkins Technology Elementary Technology School (PreK-5)
- Blanchard Elementary School (PreK-5)
- Bethune/Oak Park Elementary (PreK-5)
- Caddo Heights Elementary School (PreK-5)
- Cherokee Park Elementary School (PreK-5)
- Claiborne Fundamental Elementary School (K-5)
- Creswell Elementary School (PreK-5 & ESL Program)
- E. B. Williams Stoner Hill Elementary School (PreK-5)
- Eden Gardens Fundamental Elementary School (K-5)
- Eighty-First Street ECE
- Fairfield Elementary Magnet School (K-5)
- Forest Hill Elementary School (PreK-5)
- Judson Fundamental Elementary School (K-5)
- Midway Elementary Professional Development School (PreK-5)
- Mooringsport Elementary School (PreK-5)
- North Highlands Elementary School (K-5)
- Northside Elementary School (PreK-5)
- Pine Grove Elementary School (PreK-5)
- Queensborough Elementary School (PreK-5)
- Riverside Elementary School (PreK-5)
- Shreve Island Elementary School (PreK-5) Year-Round Campus
- South Highlands Elementary/Magnet (K-5)
- Southern Hills Elementary School (PreK-5)
- Summer Grove Elementary School (PreK-5)
- Summerfield Elementary School (PreK-5)
- Sunset Acres Elementary School (PreK-5)
- University Elementary School (PreK-5)
- Werner Park Elementary School (PreK-5)
- Westwood Elementary School School (PreK-5)

=== Unique schools ===
- AmiKids Alternative at Hillsdale
- Caddo Career & Technology Center
- Magnolia Charter School of Excellence
- Ombudsman at Academic Recovery and Career Discovery Center (Ingersoll)
- Pathways in Education (Grades 7-12)
- Rutherford House (Caddo Accelerated Remedial Effort)

== See also ==
- List of school districts in Louisiana
