= A. L. Williams (American football) =

American football player and coach (born 1934)

Biographical details
- Born: March 11, 1934 (age 92); Haynesville, Louisiana, U.S.

Playing career
- 1953–1956: Louisiana Tech
- Positions: Running back, wide receiver, punt returner

Coaching career (HC unless noted)
- late 1950s: Fair Park HS (LA)
- 1960–1965: Woodlawn HS (LA) (assistant)
- 1966–1973: Woodlawn HS (LA)
- 1974: Northwestern State (assistant)
- 1975–1982: Northwestern State
- 1983–1986: Louisiana Tech

Administrative career (AD unless noted)
- 1978–1983: Northwestern State

Head coaching record
- Overall: 66–65–1 (college)
- Tournaments: 3–1 (NCAA D-I-AA playoffs)

Accomplishments and honors

Championships
- 1 Southland (1984)

Awards
- Louisiana Tech Athletic Hall of Fame (2007)

Albert Lawrence Williams Jr., known as A. L. Williams, (born March 11, 1934) is an American former football coach and college athletic administrator. He held the position of head football coach at Northwestern State University from 1975 to 1982 and Louisiana Tech University from 1983 to 1986. Throughout his coaching career, he amassed a record of 66–65–1 in college football. Williams also served as the athletic director at Northwestern State from 1978 to 1983.

Williams began his coaching career at the high school level, at Fair Park High School and Woodlawn High School in Shreveport, Louisiana. During his tenure at Woodlawn, Williams achieved remarkable success, guiding the team to a commendable record of 64–25. Under his leadership, Woodlawn secured four district titles and clinched the state championship in 1968, with quarterback Joe Ferguson playing a pivotal role. Notably, Williams also had the opportunity to coach Terry Bradshaw during his time at Woodlawn.

== Head coaching record ==
=== College ===
Year	Team	Overall	Conference	Standing	Bowl/playoffs	NCAA^{#}
Northwestern State Demons (NCAA Division II independent) (1975)
1975	Northwestern State	1–10				
Northwestern State Demons (NCAA Division I independent) (1976–1977)
1976	Northwestern State	5–5				
1977	Northwestern State	6–5				
Northwestern State Demons (NCAA Division I-AA independent) (1978–1982)
1978	Northwestern State	5–6				
1979	Northwestern State	3–6				
1980	Northwestern State	8–3				
1981	Northwestern State	4–6				
1982	Northwestern State	6–5				
Northwestern State:		38–46				
Louisiana Tech Bulldogs (Southland Conference) (1983–1986)
1983	Louisiana Tech	4–7	2–4	T–5th		
1984	Louisiana Tech	10–5	5–1	1st	L NCAA Division I-AA Championship	9
1985	Louisiana Tech	8–3	4–2	T–2nd		14
1986	Louisiana Tech	6–4–1	3–2	T–2nd		
Louisiana Tech:		28–19–1	16–21			
Total:		66–65–1				
National championship Conference title Conference division title or championship game berth
