= Booker T. Washington High School (Shreveport, Louisiana) =

Booker T. Washington New Technology High School
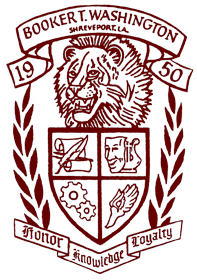

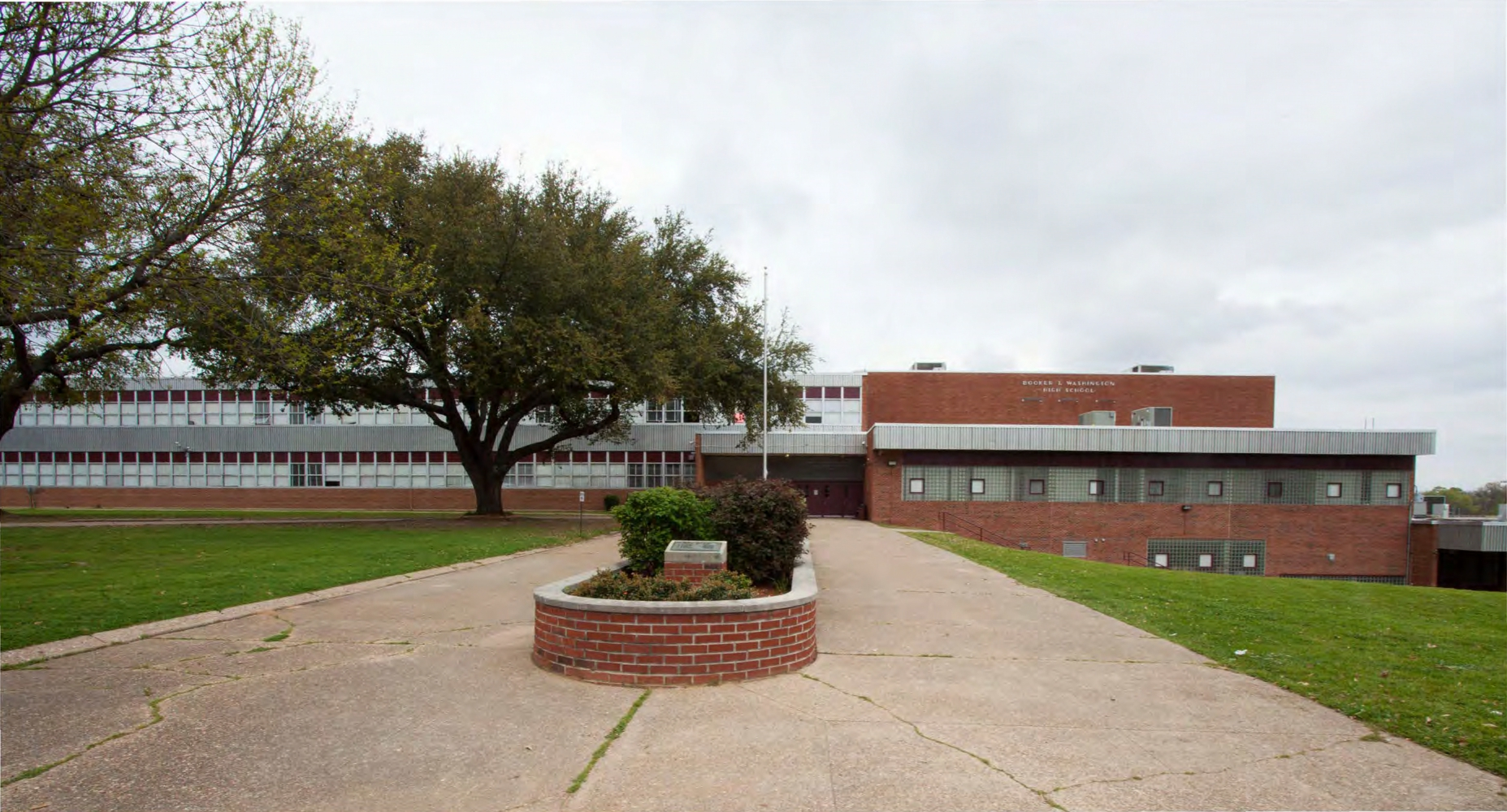

Location
- 2104 Milam Street; Shreveport, Louisiana 71103; United States; 32°30′19″N 93°46′26″W

Information
- Former name: Booker T. Washington High School
- Type: Public secondary
- Motto: Honor, Knowledge and Loyalty
- Established: January 23, 1950
- School district: Caddo Parish Public Schools
- Principal: Crystal Barnes, M.Ed.
- Teaching staff: 74.59
- Grades: 9-12
- Enrollment: 999 (2018-19)
- Colors: Maroon and white
- Mascot: Lion
- Nickname: Lions
- Rival: Green Oaks Giants
- Website: btw.caddoschools.org

Booker T. Washington New Technology High School is a public high school in Shreveport, Louisiana, United States, named after educational pioneer Booker T. Washington. Caddo Parish Public Schools operates the school.

== History ==
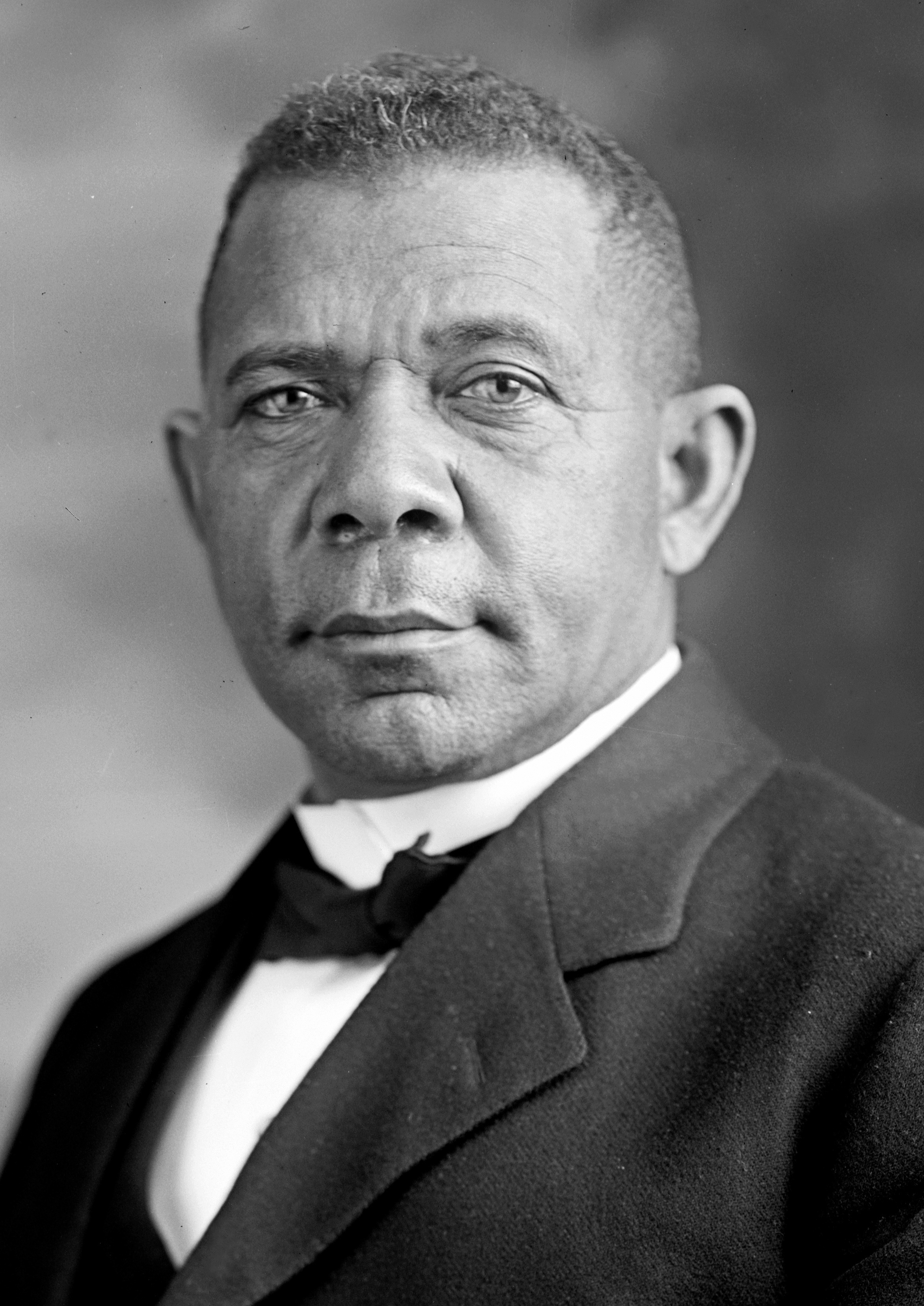
Booker T. Washington, education pioneer the school is named in honor of.

In 1945, educational facilities for African-Americans were reported by community activists and students to have been in "deplorable" condition. Construction of a new high school was proposed. Enrollments were overcrowded at Central High School, and the Milam Street Trade School. Booker T. Washington High School was built at a site across from the trade school. Completed in 1949, it was named for the founder of Tuskegee Institute in Tuskegee, Alabama. In 2015, Booker T. Washington was listed on the National Register of Historic Places.

The Milam Street Trade School and Central High School both became junior high schools when Booker T. Washington High School opened on January 23, 1950.

Booker T. Washington High School was considered a model school for African-Americans, being featured in the October 1950 issue of Life magazine. The article highlighted the school its innovative architecture, accommodations for traditional academics, and career, technical, and industrial education programs. Built at a cost of $1,514,065 for the physical plant and $500,000 for equipment, Booker T. Washington became one of the most modern schools in Louisiana, having individual lockers for all students, central heating, movable desks, modern laboratories, administrative offices, asphalt tile floors, and fluorescent lighting. A massive renovation took place in 1991; another remodeling to facilities occurred in July 2014 after a fire damaged the main wing. An additional 3,000 capacity gymnasium complete with health classrooms, a laundry area, as well as dressing rooms for both the home and opposing teams was completed in the fall of 2006.

In 1989 the girls basketball team became the first in northwestern Louisiana to win a state championship. The team would repeatedly win Class 4A championships in 1990 and again in 1991. The men's basketball team won its first LHSAA Class 4A championship in 1973.

The school hosted coaches such as Leonard "Jitterbug" Barnes and George T. Brown, and continues to be prominent in both athletics and academics.

Traditions at Booker T. Washington High School include the annual Soul Bowl, featuring the Booker T. Washington High School Lions and the Green Oaks High School's Giants; and baccalaureate services for graduating seniors.

There have been four shootings on the school's campus resulting in injuries, in 1984, 2005, 2009 and 2020.

== Academics ==
The initial curriculum offered basic high school/college prep academic courses in English, literature, music, social science, health, general science, biology, algebra, geometry, chemistry, and physical education, as well as numerous vocational courses to supplement the work at the Milam Street Trade School. New vocational courses included commercial baking, laundry and dry cleaning processes, typing, shorthand and bookkeeping, auto mechanics (including machine body and fender repair), masonry and cement work, graphic arts, carpentry, electrical name mechanics, sheet metal working, pottery and clay, landscape gardening and hot-house horticulture, leather-craft, home laundry, cooking, sewing, needle-craft, shoe-craft, and beauty culture (later cosmetology).

In the fall of 2011, Booker T. Washington added seventh and eighth grades to its original 9–12 configuration. Seventh and eighth grades are no longer part of the configuration as of 2017, when Fair Park High School became a middle school, merging its 9–12 population with Booker T. Washington. Enrollment now tops 1,100 students.

The school incorporates an intensive technology focus into the core subjects of math, science, English/language arts and social studies, through the use of grant funded laboratories and technology. Teachers currently participate in the Teacher Advancement Program Model.

By the spring of 2013, Booker T. Washington High School had made enough academic progress to be removed from the state "Academically Unacceptable" list on which it had been included for the preceding seven years. The school currently offers three magnet programs to eligible students in Caddo Parish: telecommunications, barbering, and cosmetology.

Booker T. Washington High School is currently accredited by the Southern Association of Colleges and Schools, which is recognized as a regional accrediting agency by the United States Department of Education. Booker T. Washington first gained accreditation in 1961 and will be up for renewal in 2019.

== Extra-curricular programs ==
- 4-H
- BTW Society
- National Honor Society
- Mu Alpha Theta
- Pep Squad
- Choir
- BTW Marching Band
- Danceline, Flagline, and Majorettes
- K-BTW News
- Black Heritage
- Spanish Club
- Literary Rally
- TRiO - Upward Bound
- TRiO - Talent Search

== Athletics ==
Booker T. Washington High athletics competes in the LHSAA and its students participate in the following sports:

- Men's Basketball
- Women's Basketball
- Cheerleading
- Football
- Girls Softball Team
- Track and Field
- Junior High Athletics (basketball, football, softball)

=== Championships ===
Football championships

- (3) State Championships: 1951, 1952, 1964

The men and women's basketball, football, and track and field teams have made the playoffs multiple years in LHSAA Class 4A (Class 3A prior to 2017) state playoffs.

== Dual-enrollment programs ==
Booker T. Washington High School partners with Southern University at Shreveport to provide eleventh and twelfth grade students the opportunity to earn college credit in general education courses (English, math, social sciences, and natural sciences) while earning credit towards their high school diplomas.

== Defunct programs ==
- Caddo Parish Computer Science Magnet Program (1983–2010)

== Alma Mater (song) ==
Words by Mr. Blanchard K. Bell (1950)

The Booker T. Washington High School of Shreveport Alma Mater has two verses. The first verse is the most popular – sung at athletic functions and other informal events pertaining to the school. The second verse signifies the lengthier version of the BTWHS Alma Mater. The second verse is rarely heard – only at formal ceremonies such as commencement and baccalaureate services.

First verse:

O, Booker T Washington High School, we'll always honor and cherish thee. O, Booker T. Washington High School we'll sing thy praises eternally. Our colors maroon and white boldly fly, roar lion our brave mascot, keep spirits high. O, Booker T. Washington High School, we pledge our hearts to thee.

Second verse:

O, Booker T. Washington High School, we'll praise thee ever as years go by. O, Booker T. Washington High School, we'll hold thy precepts both far and high. Through downfall or victory our voices raise. O, Booker T. Washington High School, to thee our loyalty.

== Fight song ==
The Booker T. Washington High School fight song is played during athletic events. It is written to the tune of Illinois Loyalty (We're Loyal to You), the fight song of the University of Illinois.

== Marching Band ==
The Booker T. Washington High School Marching Band is a show-style marching band that participates in many parades, competitions, and other activities. The band uses a high-step marching style that is common among bands of its genre.

The BTW Marching Band has performed for the Shreveport-Bossier Mavericks and were featured on ESPN during halftime. The "Golden Elegance" dance line, The "Lionettes" Majorettes, The “ Golden Elite Twirlers “ Flagline, accompany the marching band as auxiliaries.

Most recent accomplishments of the Booker T. Washington High School Marching Band include the following:

- Various First Place Trophies in Area Parades including Gusher Days in Oil City (2007)
- Grand Champions, Huntington High School Drumline Competition (2012)
- Superior Ratings, LMEA Music Festival (2013)
- Grand Champions, Madison High School Annual Battle of the Bands (2014,2015)
- Grand Champions, General Trass High School Annual Battle of the Bands (2015)
- UAPB Last Band Standing Competition, Champions (2015)
- Annual National Black Rodeo in Bossier City, LA (2015)

== Notable alumni ==
- Jim Battle, former NFL player
- Roosevelt Collins, gridiron football player
- Charley Granger, former NFL player
- Michael Harris, former NFL player
- Akasha Gloria Hull, poet, educator, writer, and architect of black women's studies
- Essex Johnson, former NFL player
- Richard Neal, former NFL player
- Ivory V. Nelson, chemist and past president of Lincoln University and Central Washington University
- Barbara Norton, member of the Louisiana House of Representatives for District 3
- Profyle, 1990s music group

== See also ==
- National Register of Historic Places listings in Caddo Parish, Louisiana
- List of things named after Booker T. Washington
