= Louisiana State University Shreveport =

Public university in Shreveport, Louisiana, US

- Type: Public university
- Established: 1967; 59 years ago
- Parent institution: LSU System
- Accreditation: SACSCOC
- Academic affiliations: CUMU; Space-grant
- Endowment: $32 million
- Chancellor: Robert T. Smith
- Faculty: 200
- Students: 10,000+
- Undergraduates: 2,600+
- Postgraduates: 7,000+
- Location: Shreveport, Louisiana, U.S. 32.4268°N 93.7062°W
- Campus: Urban
- Colors: Purple & Gold
- Nickname: Pilots
- Sporting affiliations: NAIA – RRAC
- Mascots: Rev, the River Monster
- Website: www.lsus.edu
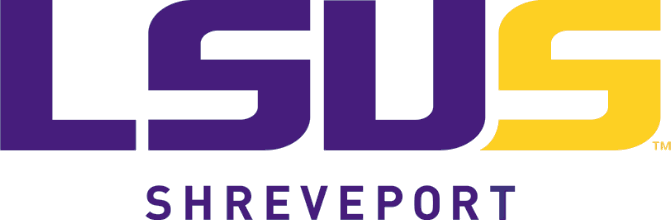

Academic rankings

Master's
- Washington Monthly: 384

Regional
- U.S. News & World Report: 96-122(South)

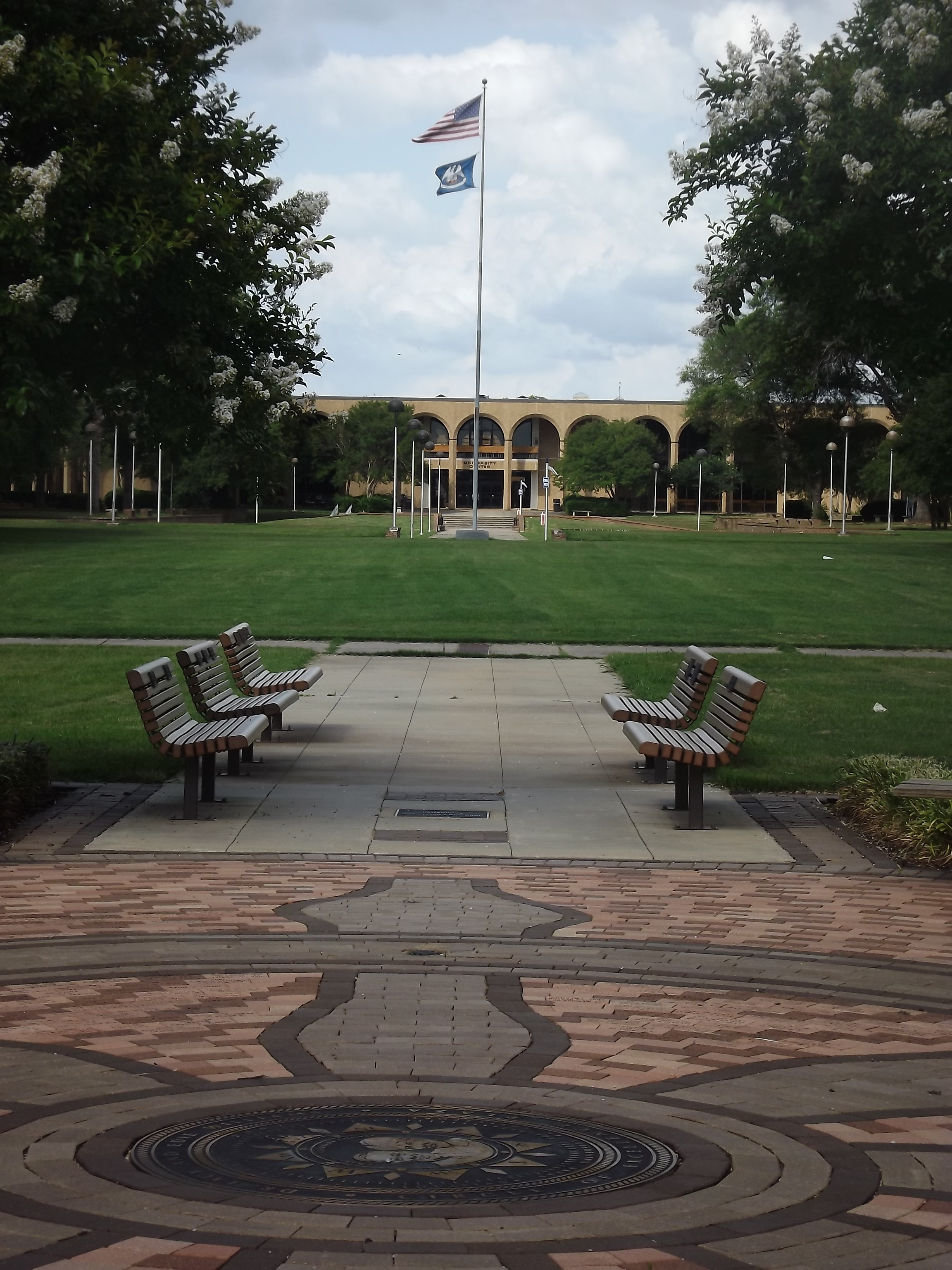
LSUS

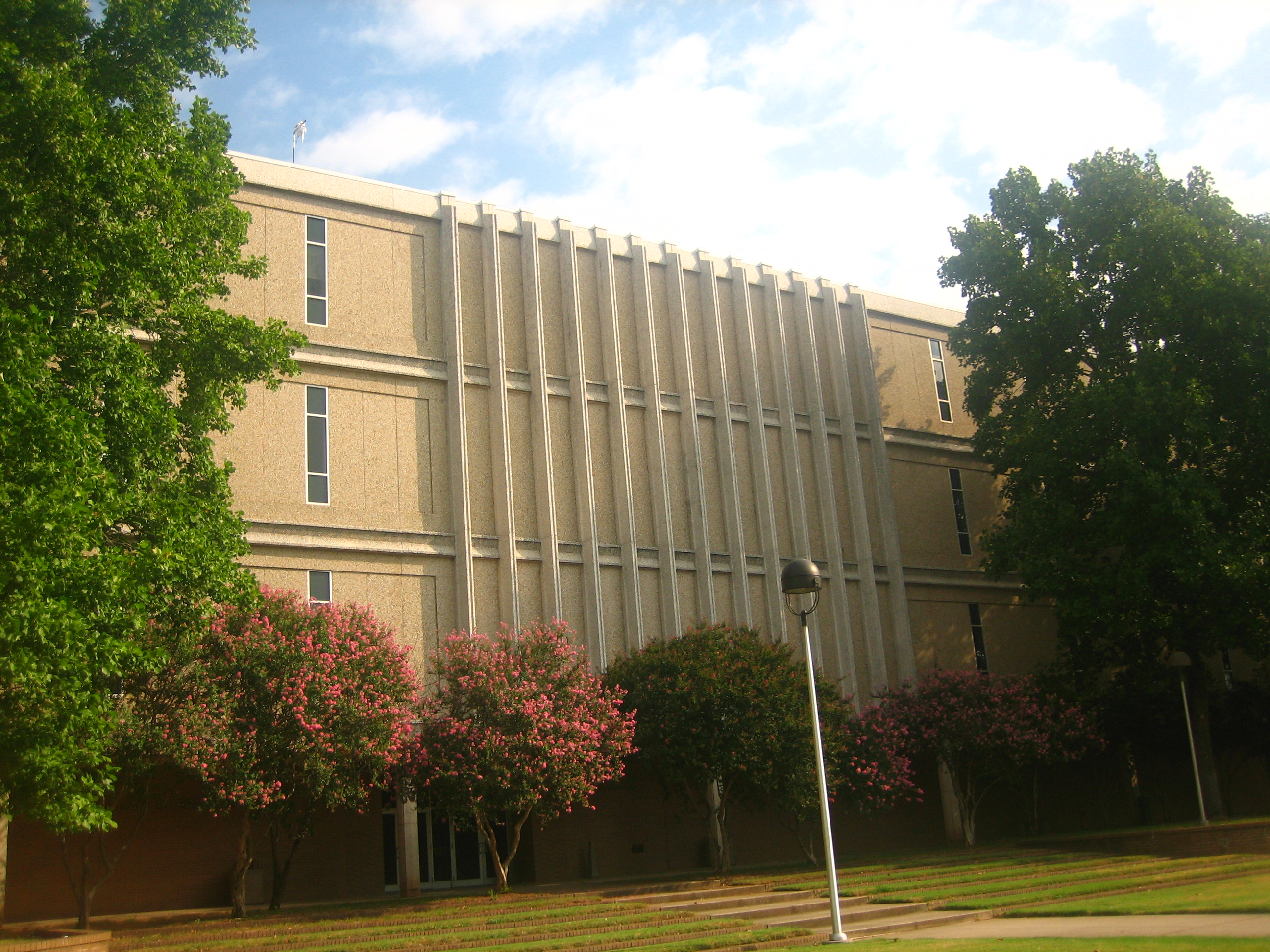
Four-story William H. Bronson Hall houses classrooms and offices. It is named for a former publisher of the Shreveport Times.

Louisiana State University Shreveport (LSU Shreveport or LSUS) is a public university in Shreveport, Louisiana. It is part of the Louisiana State University System. Initially a two-year college, LSUS has expanded into a university with 25 undergraduate degree programs, 13 master's degree programs, and a Doctorate of Education in Leadership Studies. LSUS offers more than 50 extracurricular organizations and operates Red River Radio, a public radio network based in Shreveport, as well as the Spring Street Museum in downtown Shreveport, the Pioneer Heritage Center on campus, the Red River Watershed Management Institute, Institute for Nonprofit Administration and Research and the Center for Business and Economic Research.

== History ==
In September 1967, Louisiana State University Shreveport opened its doors as a two-year commuter college with an enrollment of 807 students under the direction of dean Donald Shipp. The campaign to establish a branch of Louisiana State University (LSU) in Shreveport began in 1936 when the Caddo Parish Police Jury passed a resolution for the school with the support of Frank Fulco and several civic organizations including the Queensborough Civic Club. However, when Louisiana state senator Roscoe Cranor presented the formal request to governor Richard Leche in 1937, he rejected the proposal.

Another nineteen years would pass before state representative Frank Fulco introduce a bill to the Louisiana House in 1956 to, yet again, establish a branch of LSU in Shreveport. It failed in committee, forcing Fulco to introduce a resolution calling for a feasibility study by the State Department of Education to determine the need for a state college in Shreveport. The resolution passed and the study took two years to complete. It revealed that not only was a public college needed in Shreveport but that the citizens of the area desired it, invigorating debate over its necessity and fiscality. The debate concluded in 1964 with the introduction of House Bill 87. By 1965, the LSU Board of Supervisors formally had established LSUS as an integral division of Louisiana State University and appointed Donald Shipp as the first dean of LSUS. Shipp quickly established a base of operations at the old Line Avenue School with A.J. Howell as the business manager and Fabia Thomas as the registrar and hired the original core faculty.

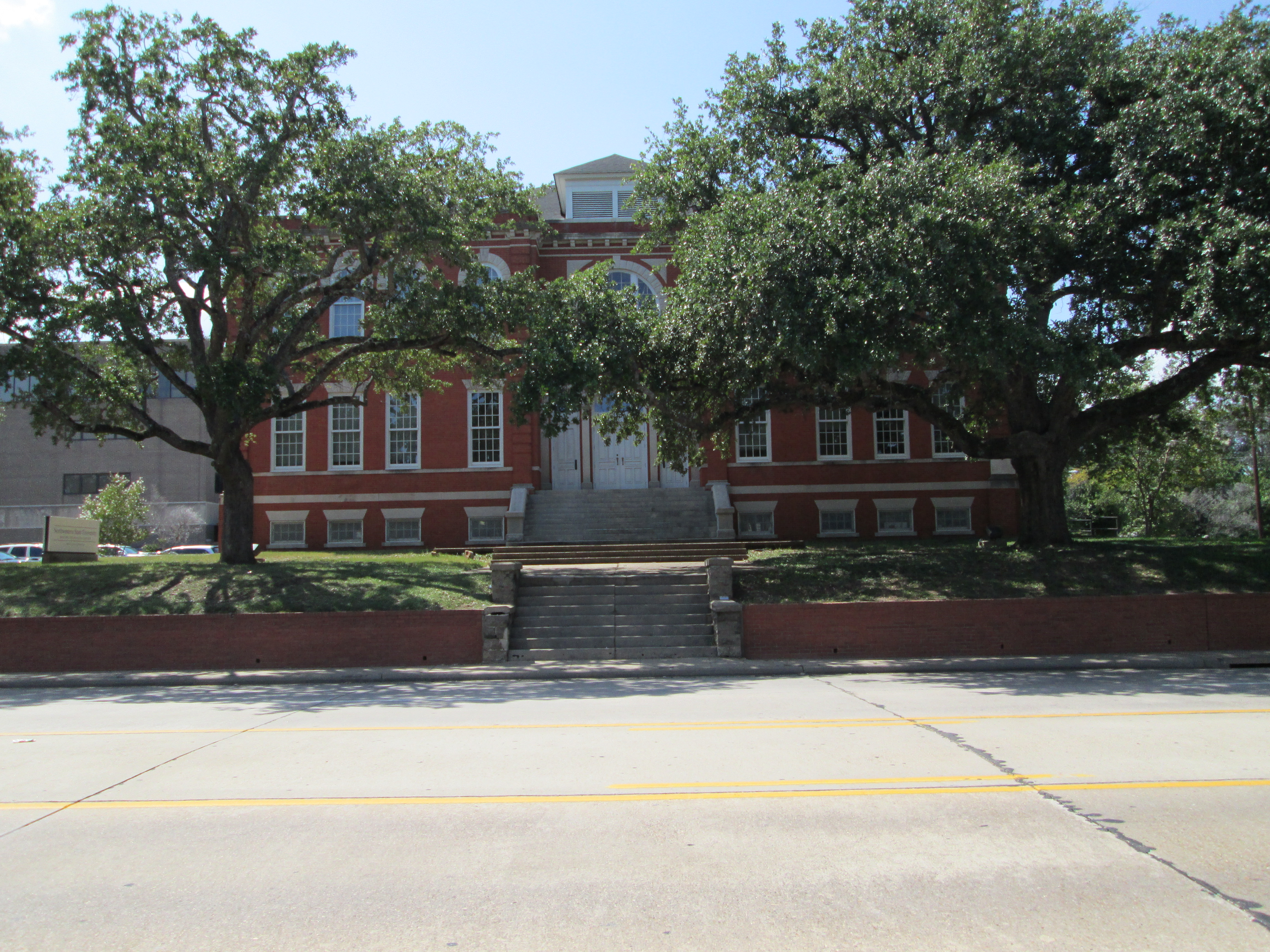
Line Avenue School Shreveport

The Line Avenue School remained the center location for the students, faculty, and staff until the completed construction of the three-story Science Building and a two-story Library on the new campus grounds located off Hwy 1 in Southeast Shreveport in 1967.

Soon after classes began that September in 1967, a push for a four-year status for LSUS ensued by the Student Government Association and Circle K Club of LSUS along with other prominent members of Shreveport. Louisiana state senator Don Williamson of Caddo Parish became the lead author of Senate Bill No. 16 for a four-year degree-granting status for LSUS supported by state senators Jackson B. Davis and C. Kay Carter and many state representatives. William "Bill" Bronson, publisher of the Shreveport Times and Vice Chairman of the Coordinating Council for Higher Education, used The Times and The Monroe Morning World to endorse the four-year bill for LSUS.

However, surrounding colleges, fearing the loss of student enrollment to a state four-year degree-granting university, staunchly opposed LSUS becoming a four-year school. The opposition sought to kill the bill by securing the opinion of the attorney general, stating approval of the proposal would require a two-thirds vote rather than a simple majority. Additionally, an amendment attached to the bill prohibited the construction of dormitories on the Shreveport campus. However, the supporters of the bill agreed to the change and governor Edwin Edwards signed the bill into law June 22, 1972, under Act No. 66. Shortly afterward, the Louisiana Council for Higher Education authorized four major academic divisions and 39 degree programs for LSUS. By the fall of 1973, dean Shipp was promoted to chancellor and LSUS instituted its third academic year and its senior year in the fall of 1974.

On May 15, 1975, LSUS held its first commencement at the Municipal Auditorium in Shreveport conferring degrees on 223 students almost 40 years after the initial effort of Frank Fulco to establish a branch of LSU in Shreveport.

On May 5, 1978, the Academic Affairs Committee of the Board of Regents for the state unanimously adopted the motion for LSUS to offer graduate studies for the Master of Education in Secondary Education catapulting LSUS and the Shreveport area into the graduate consortium. A year later, the same committee approved the graduate studies for the Master of Business Administration at LSUS and, by 2016, LSUS would have an additional ten graduate programs.

The institution received approval from the Board of Regents for the State of Louisiana on May 22, 2013, to begin offering the doctor of education (EdD). The following year, the Southern Association of Colleges and Schools Commission on Colleges (SACSCOC) approved the institution to be accredited as a Level V institution.

== Academics ==
LSUS offers 25 undergraduate programs, 13 master's degree programs, and one doctoral degree. All of LSUS's business degrees are accredited by AACSB-International. LSUS offers several online courses, including five online master's degrees.

== Student life ==
Undergraduate demographics as of Fall 2023
Race and ethnicity	Total
White	57%
Black	25%
Two or more races	6%
Unknown	5%
International student	4%
Asian	2%
American Indian/Alaska Native	1%
Hispanic	1%
Economic diversity
Low-income (Note: The percentage of students who received an income-based federal Pell grant intended for low-income students.)	43%
Affluent (Note: The percentage of students who are a part of the American middle class at the bare minimum.)	57%

The University Center (UC) at LSUS serves as the campus hub for student, faculty, and staff activities and is a centerpiece of the LSUS campus. The Student Life staff maintains up-to-date information on each registered student organization such as its officers or authorized representatives, its purpose, and its advisor.

=== Organizations ===
LSUS has over 50 student organizations that include Academic/Professional, Governing, Greek, Honorary, Religious, Service, Special Interest, and Sports.

=== Media ===
The campus serves as the studio location for the public radio network Red River Radio and flagship station KDAQ.

The Almagest, from the Arabic name for Ptolemy's astronomical treatise, is the university's student newspaper in both print and broadcasting and has kept the community at LSUS informed since 1967. The paper is published six to twelve times each fall and spring semester. In 2015, the paper went 100% online.

Spectra, called Narcissus initially, is a student literary magazine that has been in production since 1969 that consists of student and faculty poetry and prose as well as visual artwork.

=== Greek ===
Several fraternal or sorority organizations make up Greek life at LSUS.

== Libraries ==
Noel Memorial Library

=== The Noel Memorial Library ===
The Noel Memorial Library collects materials sufficient to support the university's curricula, then organizes the elements, and makes them readily available to the patrons of the library. Supplies readily available consist of 250,000 books, access to 100,000 electronic books, and 60,000 electronic journals. Additionally, the library houses The Northwest Louisiana Archives and Special Collections and the James Smith Noel Collection of rare books, which is under permanent loan to LSUS. Also, the library is a select depository for United States government documents and Louisiana state documents.

==== Northwest Louisiana Archives ====
The Northwest Louisiana Archives accumulates individual collections relating to the Shreveport area, northwest Louisiana, and the lower Red River region such as vital historical records and manuscripts from the area known as the Ark-La-Tex. Within the Archives, you will find over 1.5 million photographs and negatives documenting the history and culture of the Ark-La-Tex, 800 maps, over 200 oral histories, and 23,000 linear feet of records and manuscripts that are available for researchers to discover the rich and colorful heritage of the region.

==== The Noel Collection ====
The Noel Collection houses the most extensive private collection of antiquarian books in the United States with approximately 250,000 volumes that range from religion, philosophy, natural history, curiosities, travel literature, cartography, and much more, and is the life's work of Mr. James Smith Noel. Within the collection, pre-1850 European and American literature and history are most prevalent.

== Museums ==
=== The Museum of Life Sciences ===
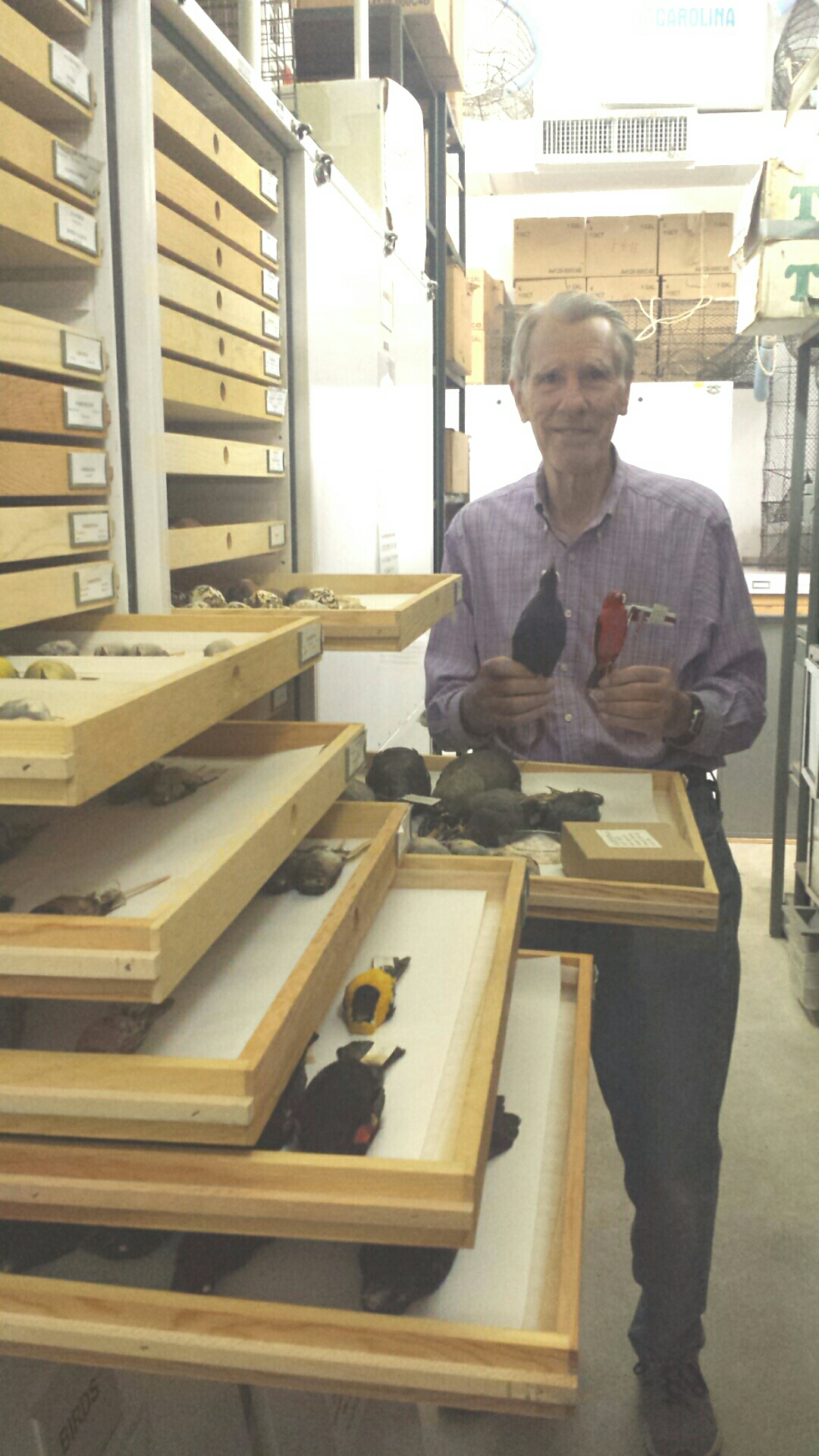
The Museum of Life Sciences

The Museum of Life Sciences has the following cataloged collections:

- 9,148 specimens of amphibians and reptiles
- 2,032 specimens of mammals
- 2,118 specimens of birds
- 1,430 specimens of fish
- 35,700 specimens of mollusk
- 2,000 specimens of insects
- 2,650 specimens of spiders
- 107 specimens of crawfish
- 10,678 specimens of vascular plants

=== Pioneer Heritage Center ===
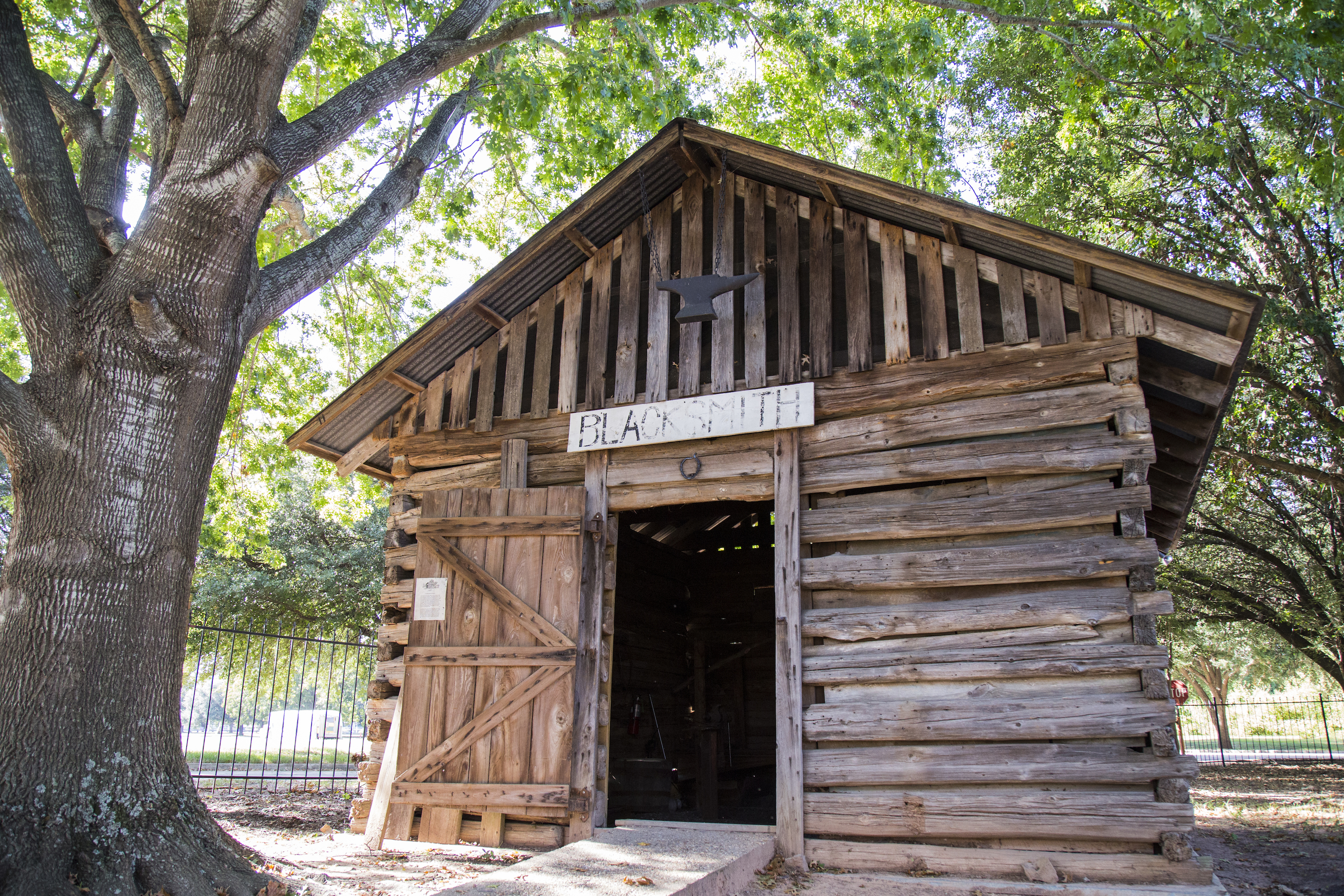
Blacksmith Shop

In 1977, the Junior League of Shreveport and LSUS established the Pioneer Heritage Center on the grounds of the LSUS campus as an educational program that provides interpretive tours through the seven plantation structures at the center.

Buildings at the Center include:

- The Caspiana House (the big house from the Caspiana Plantation)
- The Thrasher House (a log dogtrot)
- A detached Kitchen
- A log single pen blacksmith shop
- A doctor's office
- A commissary
- A riverfront mission

=== Spring Street Museum ===
The Spring Street Museum, arguably the oldest building in Shreveport, is located in Downtown Shreveport at 525 Spring Street. The museum is free for visitors.

== Athletics ==
The LSU Shreveport (LSUS) athletic teams are called the Pilots. The university is a member of the National Association of Intercollegiate Athletics (NAIA), primarily competing in the Red River Athletic Conference (RRAC) since the 2010–11 academic year. The Pilots previously competed in the Gulf Coast Athletic Conference (GCAC; now known as the HBCU Athletic Conference) from 2000–01 to 2009–10.

LSUS competes in six intercollegiate varsity sports: Men's sports include baseball, basketball and soccer; while women's sports include basketball, soccer and tennis. Club sports include bass fighting, eSports and weightlifting.

=== Accomplishments ===
The LSUS athletic program has produced many championship teams collecting nine regular season conference titles, 16 conference tournament championships, and competed in 31 NAIA National Tournaments.

In 2025, the LSU–Shreveport Pilots baseball team became the first team to go undefeated for an entire season in the history of college baseball at any level, winning the school's first national championship in any sport.

=== Facilities ===
The Health and Physical Education Building includes The Dock, a 1,000-seat gymnasium and home to the LSUS men's and women's basketball teams. The Health and Physical Education Building also includes the USA Weightlifting High Performance and Development Center which is home to the LSUS weightlifting team. Located adjacent to the building and part of the complex are eight tennis courts. Pilot Field is home to the LSUS baseball team and The Swamp is the home of the men's and women's soccer teams.

== Notable alumni and faculty ==
=== Notable alumni ===
- Royal Alexander, attorney in Shreveport
- Ransom Ashley, artist and photographer
- Hazel Beard, former mayor of Shreveport
- Sherri Smith Buffington, former state senator from Caddo Parish and DeSoto Parish
- Jeff Cox, Division C judge of the 26th Judicial District Court since 2005
- Brandon Friedman, former Deputy Assistant Secretary, United States Department of Housing and Urban Development; author of The War I Always Wanted
- Kendrick Farris, Olympic weightlifter
- Sylvia Hoffman, Olympic Bobsledder

=== Faculty ===
- Alexander Mikaberidze, a Georgian lawyer, author and historian who specializes in Napoleonic studies, Russian history and Georgian history. He is a professor of history and social sciences.
- Jeffrey D. Sadow, an LSUS political science professor and widely known political blogger, journalist, and satirist.
