= Tome H. Walters Jr. =

United States general

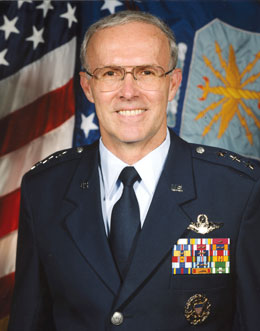
Lieutenant General Tome H. Walters Jr.

Lieutenant General Tome Hayes Walters, Jr., was Director, Defense Security Cooperation Agency, Office of the Secretary of Defense, Arlington, Virginia. The agency directs and oversees U.S. foreign military sales, foreign military financing programs, international military education and training programs, and humanitarian assistance and demining programs.

General Walters was born in Shreveport, Louisiana, and graduated from the United States Air Force Academy in 1970. He has served in command and staff positions at Air Force headquarters, the Joint Staff, Air Mobility Command, Air Training Command and Strategic Air Command. General Walters commanded an air refueling squadron, a pilot training operations group and an air refueling wing. He is a command pilot, having flown more than 3,500 hours in air refueling and trainer aircraft, including 100 air refueling support sorties in Southeast Asia during the Vietnam War.

Walters retired on July 1, 2004 and moved to Seguin, Texas.

== Education ==
- 1965 Fair Park High School, Shreveport, Louisiana
- 1970 Bachelor of Science degree in international affairs, U.S. Air Force Academy, Colorado Springs, Colorado
- 1976 Squadron Officer School, Maxwell Air Force Base, Alabama
- 1981 Air Command and Staff College, Maxwell AFB, Alabama
- 1987 Air War College, Maxwell AFB, Alabama
- 1996 Seminar XXI, Foreign Political and International Relations, Massachusetts Institute of Technology
- 1996 Program for Senior Executives in National and International Security, Harvard University

== Assignments ==
- June 1970 - July 1971, student, Undergraduate Pilot Training, Williams AFB, Arizona
- January 1972 - July 1977, pilot, aircraft commander, instructor pilot, chief of training flight, and standardization and evaluation, 11th Air Refueling Squadron, Altus AFB, Oklahoma
- August 1977 - July 1980, KC-135 flight evaluator and chief, Command Instrument Flight Division, 1st Combat Evaluation Group, Barksdale AFB, Louisiana
- August 1980 - June 1981, student, Air Command and Staff College, Maxwell AFB, Alabama
- July 1981 - May 1984, Tanker Requirements Project Officer, Directorate of Research, Development and Acquisition, Headquarters U.S. Air Force, Washington, D.C.
- May 1984 - July 1986, Commander, 407th Air Refueling Squadron, Loring AFB, Maine
- August 1986 - June 1987, student, Air War College, Maxwell AFB, Alabama
- July 1987 - August 1989, tanker force programmer, later, Deputy Chief of Strategic Forces, later, Chief, Programs Division, Directorate of Programs and Evaluation, Headquarters U.S. Air Force, Washington, D.C.
- August 1989 - December 1991, Director of Requirements, Headquarters Air Training Command, Randolph AFB, Texas
- December 1991 - February 1993, Commander, 47th Operations Group, Laughlin AFB, Texas
- February 1993 - March 1994, Commander, 19th Air Refueling Wing, Robins AFB, Georgia
- March 1994 - June 1995, Deputy Director of Programs and Evaluation, Headquarters U.S. Air Force, Washington, D.C.
- July 1995 - September 1996, Deputy Director for Operations, National Military Command Center, J-3, the Joint Staff, Washington, D.C.
- October 1996 - December 1998, Director of Global Reach Programs, Office of the Assistant Secretary of the Air Force for Acquisition, Headquarters U.S. Air Force, Washington, D.C.
- December 1998 - August 2000, Principal Assistant Deputy Undersecretary of the Air Force for International Affairs, Office of the Undersecretary of the Air Force, Headquarters U.S. Air Force, Washington, D.C.
- August 2000–July 1, 2004 (Retirement), Director, Defense Security Cooperation Agency, Office of the Secretary of Defense, Arlington, Va.

== Flight information ==
- Rating: Command pilot
- Flight hours: More than 3,500 hours
- Aircraft flown: KC-135A/R, T-37 and T-38

== Major awards and decorations ==
- Defense Distinguished Service Medal
- Air Force Distinguished Service Medal
- Defense Superior Service Medal
- Legion of Merit with oak leaf cluster
- Distinguished Flying Cross
- Meritorious Service Medal with two oak leaf clusters
- Air Medal with two oak leaf clusters
- Air Force Commendation Medal with oak leaf cluster
- Vietnam Service Medal with bronze star
- Republic of Vietnam Gallantry Cross with Palm
- Cross of Merit, Second Class (Republic of Estonia)

== Other achievements ==
- Department of State Superior Honor Award

== Effective dates of promotion ==
- Second Lieutenant June 3, 1970
- First Lieutenant December 3, 1971
- Captain December 3, 1973
- Major July 1, 1980
- Lieutenant colonel May 1, 1984
- Colonel August 1, 1989
- Brigadier general July 1, 1995
- Major General April 1, 1998
- Lieutenant general October 1, 2000
