= Brandon Friedman =

American military writer, blogger and memoirist

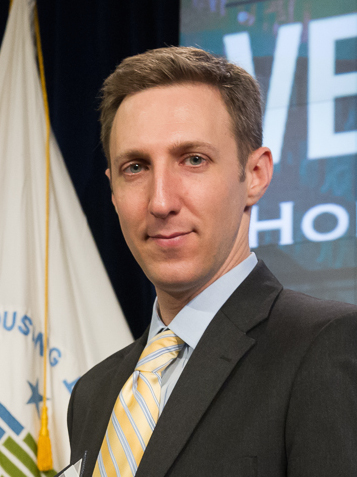
- Brandon Friedman
- Born: Shreveport, Louisiana, U.S.
- Education: Louisiana State University Shreveport (BA); University of Texas at Dallas (MPA)
- Occupations: Founder, Rakkasan Tea Company
- Website: Rakkasan Tea Company

Brandon Friedman
- Military career
- Allegiance: United States
- Branch: United States Army
- Service years: 2000–2004
- Rank: Captain
- Unit: 101st Airborne Division
- Conflicts: Operation Enduring Freedom: Operation Anaconda; Operation Iraqi Freedom
- Awards: Bronze Star (2)
- Other work: Businessman, writer, government official

Brandon Friedman is an American writer, entrepreneur and former Obama administration official. He was CEO of the McPherson Square Group before co-founding Rakkasan Tea Company in 2017. Previously, he served as the deputy assistant secretary for public affairs at the United States Department of Housing and Urban Development.

== Early life and education ==
Friedman was born and raised in Shreveport, Louisiana. He has a Master of Public Affairs from the University of Texas at Dallas (2006) and a BA in history from Louisiana State University in Shreveport (2000).

== Career ==
Friedman began his career as an infantry officer in the U.S. Army's 101st Airborne Division. In March 2002, he led a rifle platoon into Afghanistan's Shah-e-Kot Valley to engage Taliban and al Qaeda fighters as part of Operation Anaconda—a battle later written about by journalist Sean Naylor in Not a Good Day to Die. A year later, Friedman commanded a platoon during the invasion of Iraq. He led troops during combat and counterinsurgency operations in Hillah, Baghdad, and Tal Afar. Friedman left active duty in 2004 after spending the latter portion of his Iraq tour as a rifle company executive officer. He was awarded two Bronze Stars for his service in Afghanistan and Iraq.

From 2007 to 2009, Friedman was a vice chairman and spokesperson for VoteVets.org, a political action committee and non-profit 501(c)(4) with a mission of getting veterans elected to public office.

In 2007 he wrote The War I Always Wanted, a non-fiction memoir of his experiences in combat in Afghanistan and Iraq. It was named by the Army Times in 2010 as one of their best military books of the decade. Publishers Weekly called the book "cynical but appealing". The Baltimore Sun stated, "You'll want to read parts aloud."

In 2009, Friedman accepted a role as the first director of digital media at the United States Department of Veterans Affairs in Washington, D.C. According to Stars and Stripes, his job was to "revolutionize how the VA interacts with veterans on the Internet." In 2011, AOL Government noted that VA was "becoming a model for other agencies" in the area of social media communication.

After leaving VA in 2012, Friedman joined the global public relations firm FleishmanHillard as a vice president.

In March 2014, Friedman was appointed by the Obama administration as the deputy assistant secretary for public affairs at the United States Department of Housing and Urban Development.

Friedman left HUD in July 2015 and launched the McPherson Square Group, a public relations firm.

In 2017 Friedman and Terrence Kamauf founded Rakkasan Tea Company to sell loose leaf teas from post-conflict areas.
