= 2007 United States gubernatorial elections =

- October 20 and November 6, 2007

3 governorships
	Majority party	Minority party
Party	Democratic	Republican
Seats before	28	22
Seats after	28	22
Seat change	Steady	Steady
Popular vote	1,159,260	1,565,855
Percentage	37.43%	50.56%
Seats up	1	2
Seats won	1	2
- Map of the results Republican hold Democratic gain Republican gain No election

United States gubernatorial elections were held in October and November 2007 in three states. The final results were a net change of zero among the parties. Republicans picked up the open seat in Louisiana and reelected incumbent Haley Barbour in Mississippi, while Democrats defeated Republican incumbent Ernie Fletcher in Kentucky.

Going into the elections, the Democratic Party held 28 governors' seats, while the Republican Party held 22. Democratic and Republican candidates filed in all three states, and the Libertarian Party had ballot representation in Louisiana.

== Election predictions ==
State	Incumbent	Last race	Sabato October 19, 2007	Result
Kentucky	Ernie Fletcher	55.04% R	Likely D (flip)	Beshear; 58.71% D (flip)
Louisiana	Kathleen Blanco	51.95% D	Likely R (flip)	Jindal; 53.91% R (flip)
Mississippi	Haley Barbour	52.59% R	Safe R	Barbour; 57.90% R

== Race summary ==
State	Incumbent	Party	First elected	Result	Candidates
Kentucky	Ernie Fletcher	Republican	2003	Incumbent lost re-election. New governor elected. Democratic gain.	▌ ✓ Steve Beshear (Democratic) 58.7%; ▌Ernie Fletcher (Republican) 41.3%
Louisiana	Kathleen Blanco	Democratic	2003	Incumbent retired. New governor elected. Republican gain.	▌ ✓ Bobby Jindal (Republican) 53.9%; ▌Walter Boasso (Democratic) 17.4%; ▌John Georges (Independent) 14.4%; ▌Foster Campbell (Democratic) 12.4%
Mississippi	Haley Barbour	Republican	2003	Incumbent re-elected.	▌ ✓ Haley Barbour (Republican) 57.9%; ▌John Arthur Eaves Jr. (Democratic) 42.1%

== Kentucky ==
2007 Kentucky gubernatorial election
- November 6, 2007
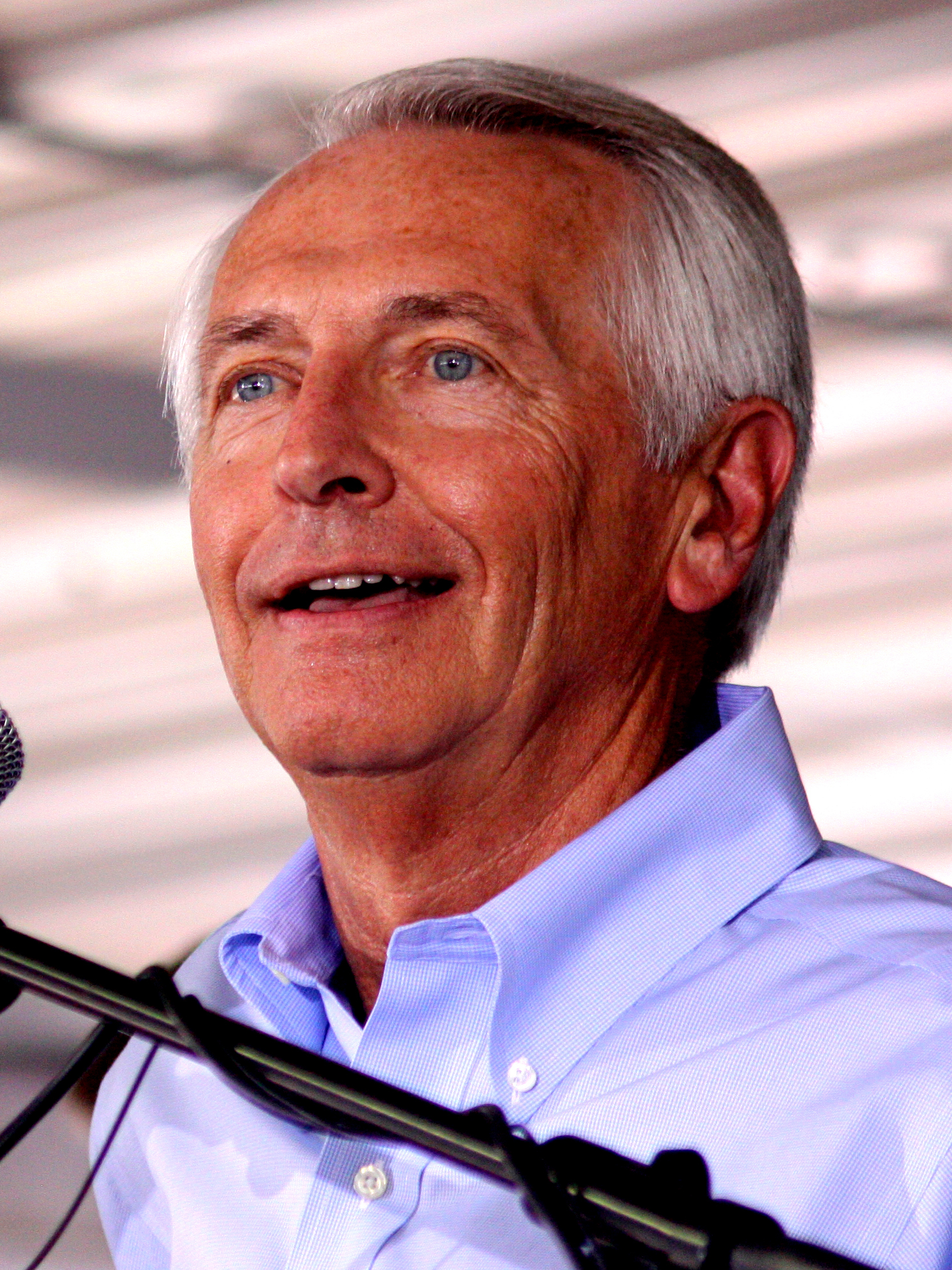

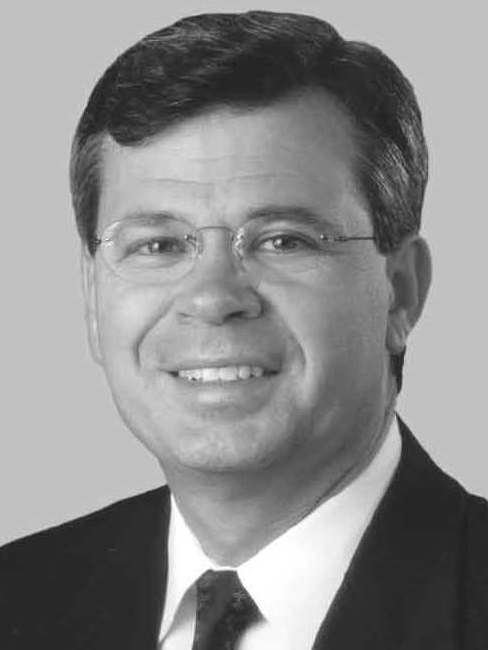
Nominee	Steve Beshear	Ernie Fletcher
Party	Democratic	Republican
Running mate	Daniel Mongiardo	Robbie Rudolph
Popular vote	619,552	435,773
Percentage	58.7%	41.3%
- County results
Governor before election
Ernie Fletcher
Republican
Elected Governor
Steve Beshear
Democratic

Governor Ernie Fletcher ran for reelection for a second term. Various polls indicated he had been very unpopular with an approval rating of 38%. Also, Fletcher's governorship had been embroiled in scandal due to the criminal indictment of several people in his administration for illegally hiring workers into the state merit system based on political considerations. Fletcher was challenged in the primary by Anne Northup, a former U.S. Representative who served Kentucky's 3rd congressional district from 1997 to 2007, as well as Paducah businessman Billy Harper. Underscoring the controversy over the hiring scandal, Lieutenant Governor Steve Pence chose not to run for re-election on the Fletcher ticket and publicly endorsed Northup. In addition, Northup was endorsed by U.S. Senator Jim Bunning. However, Fletcher won the primary, winning 101,233 votes (50%) and carrying 106 of Kentucky's 120 counties in a three-way race. Northup won the state's largest county, which contains Louisville, and her former congressional district, but lacked support at large; turnout in Jefferson County was not strong enough to make up for that.

A large number of Democrats ran in the primary, including State Treasurer Jonathan Miller, former Lieutenant Governors Steve Beshear and Steve Henry, businessman Bruce Lunsford and Kentucky House of Representatives Speaker Jody Richards. Lunsford spent over $4 million, much of it his own money; Miller dropped out of the race and endorsed Beshear. Beshear won the primary with 142,516 votes (41%) in the crowded field; his next closest competitor was Lunsford with 21%. Henry took 18% of the vote and Richards, 12%. In their election night concession speeches Lunsford, Henry and Richards each pledged their support to Beshear.

As a result of the general election on November 7, 2007, Beshear defeated Fletcher in his bid for re-election. Beshear was inaugurated on December 11, 2007.

Kentucky election
Party	Candidate	Votes	%
Democratic	Steve Beshear	619,552	58.71
Republican	Ernie Fletcher (incumbent)	435,773	41.29
Total votes		1,055,325	100.00
Democratic gain from Republican			

== Louisiana ==
2007 Louisiana gubernatorial election
- October 20, 2007
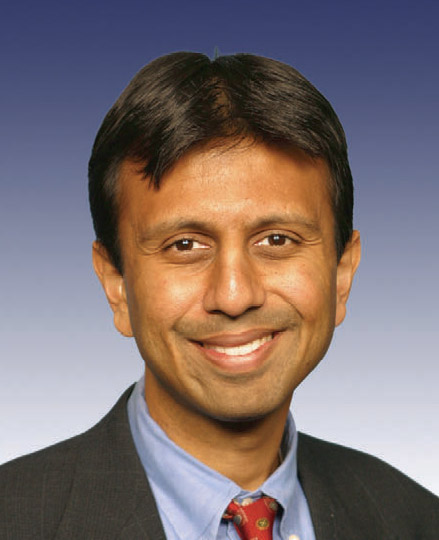

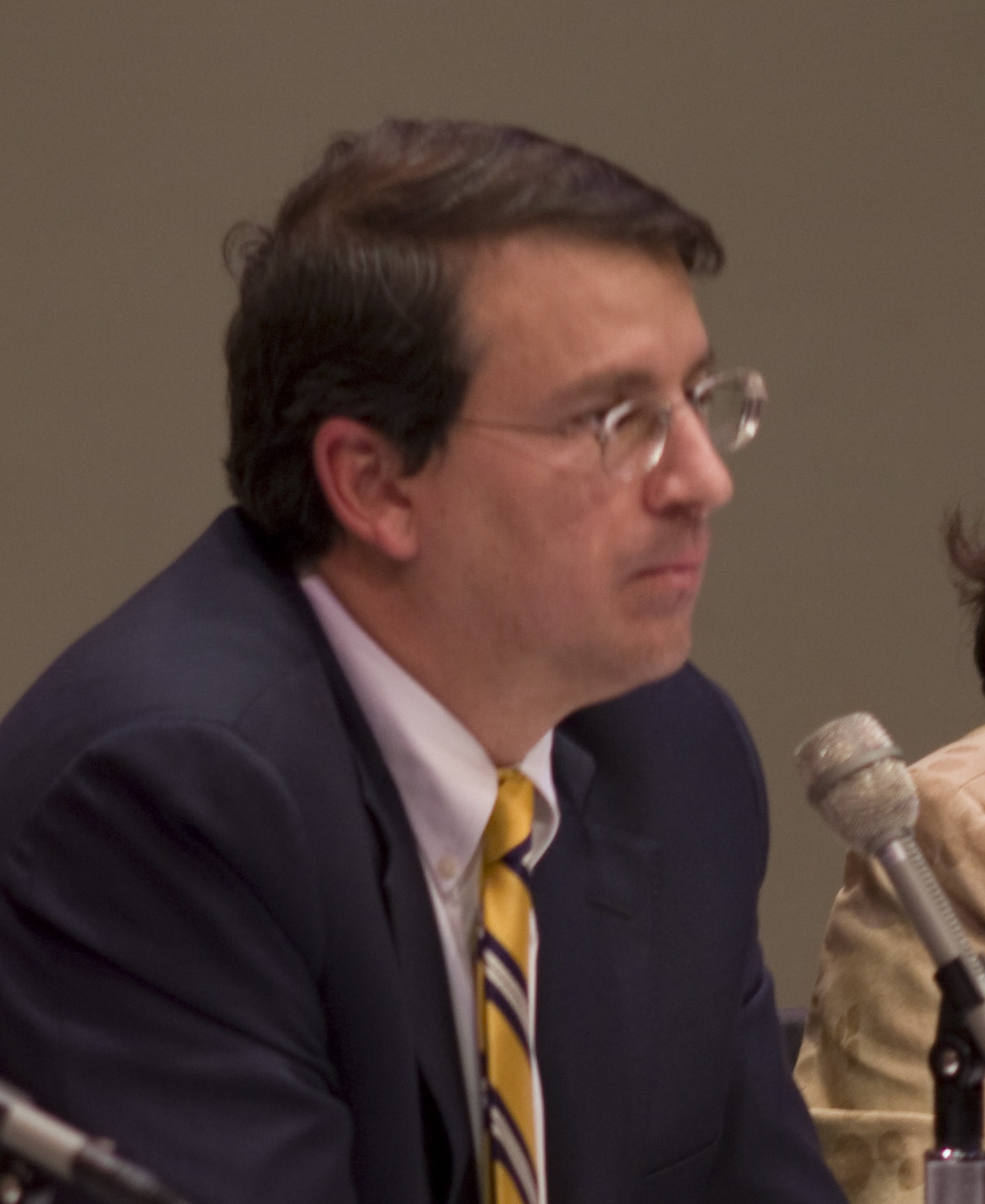
Candidate	Bobby Jindal	Walter Boasso
Party	Republican	Democratic
Popular vote	699,672	226,364
Percentage	53.9%	17.4%
Candidate	John Georges	Foster Campbell
Party	Independent	Democratic
Popular vote	186,800	161,425
Percentage	14.4%	12.4%
- Parish results
Governor before election
Kathleen Blanco
Democratic
Elected Governor
Bobby Jindal
Republican

Governor Kathleen Blanco announced on March 20, 2007, that she would not seek a second term. She had taken flak for the aftermath of Hurricane Katrina and the government's ill-preparedness to deal with casualties.

Republican U.S. Representative Bobby Jindal won about 54% of the vote in the October 20 jungle primary, enough to avoid a run-off in November. His nearest opponent, Democratic State Senator Walter Boasso, won about 17% of the vote; Independent New Orleans area businessman John Georges finished third with 14% of the vote; and Public Service Commissioner Foster Campbell (D) finished fourth with 12%.

Former U.S. Senator John Breaux, arguably the most popular Democratic politician in Louisiana, had publicly flirted with entering the race in March and April 2007, but eventually declined to run due to the unresolved controversy over whether his recent Maryland residency made him ineligible to run. After Breaux's announcement, Lieutenant Governor Mitch Landrieu also declined to run.

Jindal led in fundraising with $11 million raised up to the end of September, with $4.3 million of that left for the remainder of the campaign. Georges had put $7 million of his own money into his campaign. Boasso had spent $4.7 million of his own money and had $144,000 in the bank.

Louisiana election
Party	Candidate	Votes	%
Republican	Bobby Jindal	699,672	53.91
Democratic	Walter Boasso	226,364	17.44
Independent	John Georges	186,800	14.39
Democratic	Foster Campbell	161,425	12.44
Democratic	Mary Volentine Smith	5,843	0.45
Independent	Belinda Alexandrenko	4,782	0.37
Independent	Anthony Gentile	3,369	0.36
Libertarian	T. Lee Horne III	2,639	0.20
Independent	Sheldon Forest	2,319	0.18
Democratic	Vinny Mendoza	2,076	0.16
Democratic	Hardy Parkerson	1,661	0.13
Independent	Arthur D. Nichols	993	0.08
Total votes		1,297,943	100.00
Republican gain from Democratic			

== Mississippi ==
2007 Mississippi gubernatorial election
- November 6, 2007
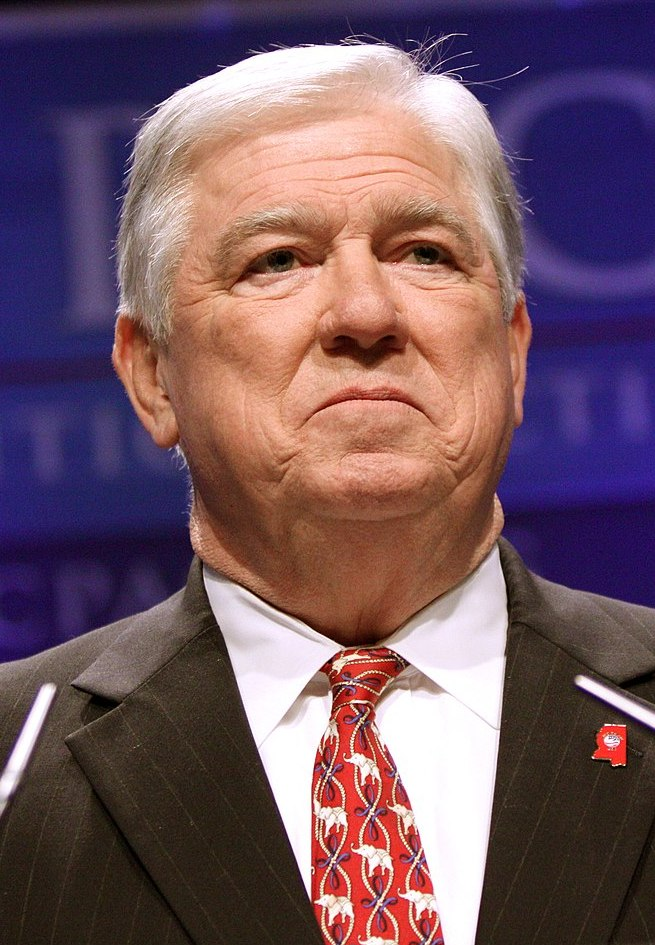

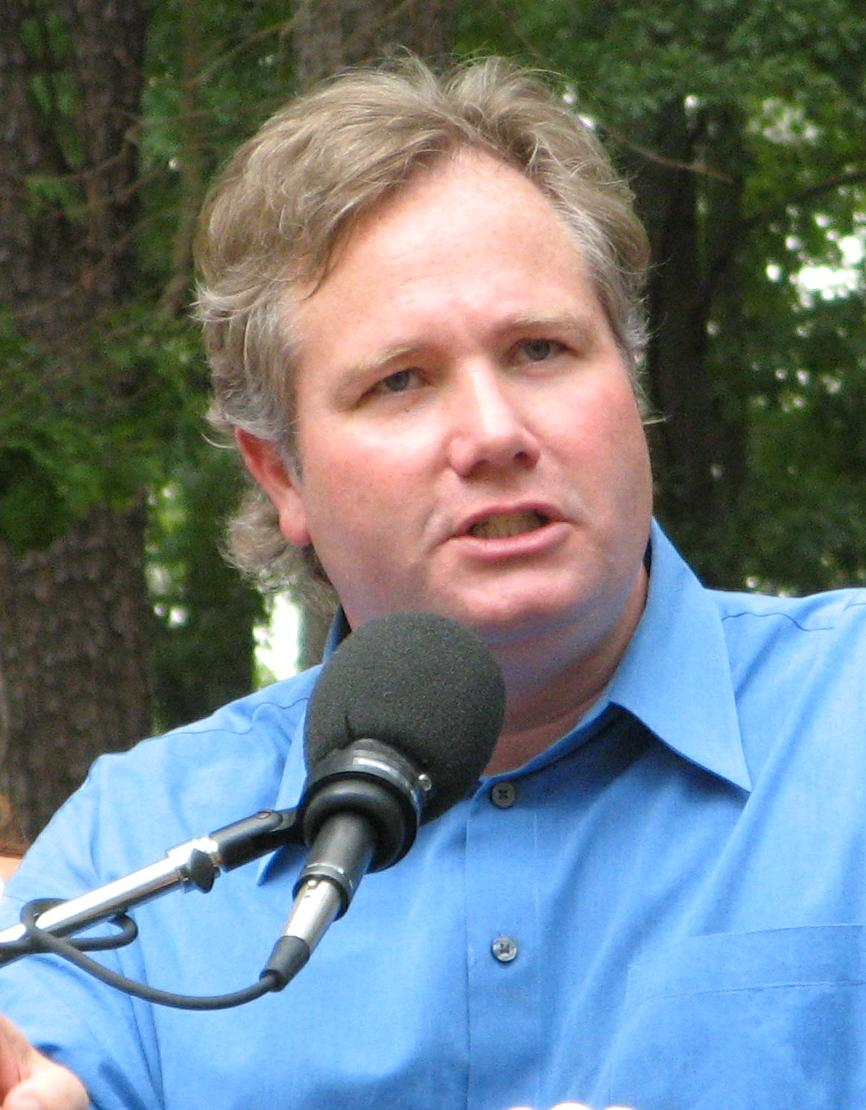
Nominee	Haley Barbour	John Arthur Eaves Jr.
Party	Republican	Democratic
Popular vote	430,807	313,232
Percentage	57.9%	42.1%
- County results
Governor before election
Haley Barbour
Republican
Elected Governor
Haley Barbour
Republican

Governor Haley Barbour ran for a second term. He was popular, with a 59% approval rating, and faced only a token primary challenge. Four Democratic candidates filed to face him in the general election, including eventual nominee attorney John Eaves.

On election day, Barbour defeated Eaves, garnering 58% of the vote.

Mississippi election
Party	Candidate	Votes	%
Republican	Haley Barbour (incumbent)	430,807	57.90
Democratic	John Arthur Eaves Jr.	313,232	42.10
Total votes		744,039	100.00
Republican hold			
