= 2007 United States state legislative elections =

- November 6, 2007

8 legislative chambers 4 states
	Majority party	Minority party	Third party
Party	Democratic	Republican	Coalition
Chambers before	56	42 (Note: Following the defection of two Senators to the Republican party, Republicans took control of the Mississippi Senate in early 2007.)	1 (Note: The Alaska Senate was controlled by a coalition of Democrats and Republicans. The minority caucus consists of Republicans who were not part of the majority coalition.)
Chambers after	58	39 (Note: Following the defection of Senator Micheal R. Williams from the Republican party, no party controlled the Tennessee Senate. Thus the chamber is not included in the total here.)	1
Overall change	▲2	▼3	Steady
- Map of upper house elections: Democrats gained control Democrats retained control No regularly-scheduled elections

- Map of lower house elections: Democrats retained control Republicans retained control No regularly-scheduled elections

Elections to state legislatures were held on November 6, 2007. Seven legislative chambers in four states held regularly scheduled elections. These off-year elections coincided with other state and local elections, including gubernatorial elections in three states. Both chambers of the Northern Mariana Islands were up as well.

Democrats held control of both chambers of the New Jersey and Louisiana legislatures, and held control of the Mississippi House of Representatives. Meanwhile, Republicans held control of the Virginia House of Delegates. Meanwhile, Democrats gained control of the Virginia Senate and the Mississippi Senate, however, Democrats had only lost control of the latter chamber at the beginning of the year when Senators James Walley and Tommy Gollott switched parties from Democratic to Republican. Thus, Republicans briefly controlled the chamber for the first time since 1876.

Additionally, Republicans lost control of the Tennessee Senate when Republican Senator Michael R. Williams became an Independent and the chamber became evenly divided with no one party in control.

== Summary table ==
Regularly scheduled elections were held in 8 of the 99 state legislative chambers in the United States. Nationwide, regularly scheduled elections were held for 578 of the 7,383 legislative seats. This table only covers regularly scheduled elections; additional special elections took place concurrently with these regularly scheduled elections.

State	Upper House				Lower House			
State	Seats up	Total	% up	Term	Seats up	Total	% up	Term
Louisiana	39	39	100	4	105	105	100	4
Mississippi	52	52	100	4	122	122	100	4
New Jersey	40	40	100	2/4 (Note: The upper houses of Arkansas, Delaware, Florida, Hawaii, Illinois, Minnesota, New Jersey, and Texas use a 2-4-4 term length system.)	80	80	100	2
Virginia	40	40	100	4	100	100	100	2

== State summaries ==
=== Louisiana ===
All seats of the Louisiana State Senate and the Louisiana House of Representatives were up for election to four-year terms in single-member districts. Democrats maintained control of both chambers.

Louisiana State Senate
Party	Before	After	Change
Democratic	24	23	▼1
Republican	15	16	▲1
Total	39	39	

Louisiana House of Representatives
Party	Before	After	Change
Democratic	66	53	▼13
Republican	37	50	▲13
Independent	2	2	Steady
Total	105	105	

=== Mississippi ===
All seats of the Mississippi State Senate and the Mississippi House of Representatives were up for election to four-year terms in single-member districts. Democrats maintained control of the lower house, and they regained control of the upper house, which they had lost due to party switching earlier in the year.

Mississippi State Senate
Party	Before	After	Change
Democratic	25	27	▲2
Republican	27	25	▼2
Total	52	52	

Mississippi House of Representatives
Party	Before	After	Change
Democratic	75	75	Steady
Republican	47	47	Steady
Total	122	122	

=== New Jersey ===
All seats of the New Jersey Senate and the New Jersey General Assembly were up for election. In 2007, senators were elected to two-year terms in single-member districts, while Assembly members were elected to two-year terms in two-member districts. Democrats retained majority control in both chambers.

Senate
Party	Before	After	Change
Democratic	22	23	▲1
Republican	18	17	▼1
Total	40	40	

General Assembly
Party	Before	After	Change
Democratic	50	48	▼2
Republican	30	32	▲2
Total	80	80	

=== Virginia ===
All seats of the Senate of Virginia and the Virginia House of Delegates were up for election in single-member districts. Senators were elected to four-year terms, while delegates serve terms of two years. Republicans maintained control of the lower chamber and but lost control of the upper chamber to the Democrats.

Senate of Virginia
Party	Before	After	Change
Democratic	16	21	▲5
Republican	24	19	▼5
Total	40	40	

Virginia House of Delegates
Party	Before	After	Change
Republican	57	54	▼3
Independent	2	2	▼1
Independent	1	2	▼1
Democratic	40	44	▲4
Total	100	100	

== Territorial and federal district summaries ==
=== Northern Mariana Islands ===
All seats of the Northern Mariana Islands House of Representatives and half of the Northern Mariana Islands Senate are up for election. Senators are elected to four-year terms and Representatives are elected to two-year terms.

House of Representatives
Party	Before	After	Change
Republican	7	12	▲5
Coalition	11	8	▼3
Total		20	20

Senate
Party	Before	After	Change
Republican	3	3	Steady
Coalition	6	6	Steady
Total		9	9

== See also ==
- 2007 United States gubernatorial elections
