= 2007 United States elections =

- ← 2005 2006 2007 2008 2009 → Off-year elections
- Election day: November 6

Congressional special elections
- Seats contested: 5
- Net seat change: 0

Gubernatorial elections
- Seats contested: 3
- Net seat change: 0
- 2007 gubernatorial election results map Republican hold Democratic gain Republican gain

Elections were held in the United States on November 6, 2007. During this off-year election, the only seats up for election in the United States Congress were special elections held throughout the year. None of these congressional seats changed party hands. There were also several gubernatorial races and state legislative elections, and numerous citizen initiatives, mayoral races in several major cities, and several types of local offices on the ballot.

Despite a favorable environment for the Democratic Party, especially after the 2006 midterms which saw Democrats take control of Congress and state governments, Louisiana is a notable exception due to the deep unpopularity of the state's Democratic governor Kathleen Blanco over her handling of the aftermath of Hurricane Katrina.

== Federal elections ==
There were five special elections to the United States House of Representatives in 2007. Four of them were held after the death of the prior incumbent, while the seat in Massachusetts's 5th congressional district opened up after Marty Meehan resigned to become the Chancellor of the University of Massachusetts Lowell. In each of these special elections, the incumbent party won.

== State elections ==
=== Gubernatorial elections ===
Three states elected governors in 2007, although only two of them voted on November 6, namely Kentucky and Mississippi. Louisiana's election date did not coincide with that of most states; its open primary was held on October 20.

The final results were a net change of zero between the political parties. The Democrats picked up the governorship in Kentucky, but the Republicans picked up the one in Louisiana. The Republicans maintained control of the governorship in Mississippi.

=== State and territorial legislative elections ===
Elections to state legislatures were held on November 6, 2007. Seven legislative chambers in four states held regularly scheduled elections. These off-year elections coincided with other state and local elections, including gubernatorial elections in three states. Both chambers of the Northern Mariana Islands were up as well.

Democrats held control of both chambers of the New Jersey and Louisiana legislatures, and held control of the Mississippi House of Representatives. Meanwhile, Republicans held control of the Virginia House of Delegates. Meanwhile, Democrats gained control of the Virginia Senate and the Mississippi Senate, however, Democrats had only lost control of the latter chamber at the beginning of the year when Senators James Walley and Tommy Gollott switched parties from Democratic to Republican. Thus, Republicans briefly controlled the chamber for the first time since 1876.

Additionally, Republicans lost control of the Tennessee Senate when Republican Senator Michael R. Williams became an Independent and the chamber became evenly divided with no one party in control.

== Local elections ==
Nationwide, there were cities, counties, school boards, special districts and others that elected members in 2007. Among the high-profile mayoral elections were the following:

- Baltimore: Sheila Dixon (D) defeated Elbert Henderson (R)
- Charlotte: Pat McCrory (R) was re-elected, defeating Beverly M. Earle (D)
- Indianapolis: Greg Ballard (R) defeated incumbent Bart Peterson (D)
- Jacksonville: John Peyton (R) was re-elected, defeating Jackie Brown (D)
- Philadelphia: Michael Nutter (D) defeated Al Taubenberger (R)
- Pittsburgh: Incumbent Luke Ravenstahl (D) was elected to a full term, defeating Mark DeSantis (R) in this special election. Ravenstahl was appointed as interim mayor in 2006 following the death of Bob O'Connor
- San Francisco: Gavin Newsom (D) was re-elected, defeating several other candidates in an instant-runoff voting system.
