= Ronnie Musgrove =

American politician (born 1956)

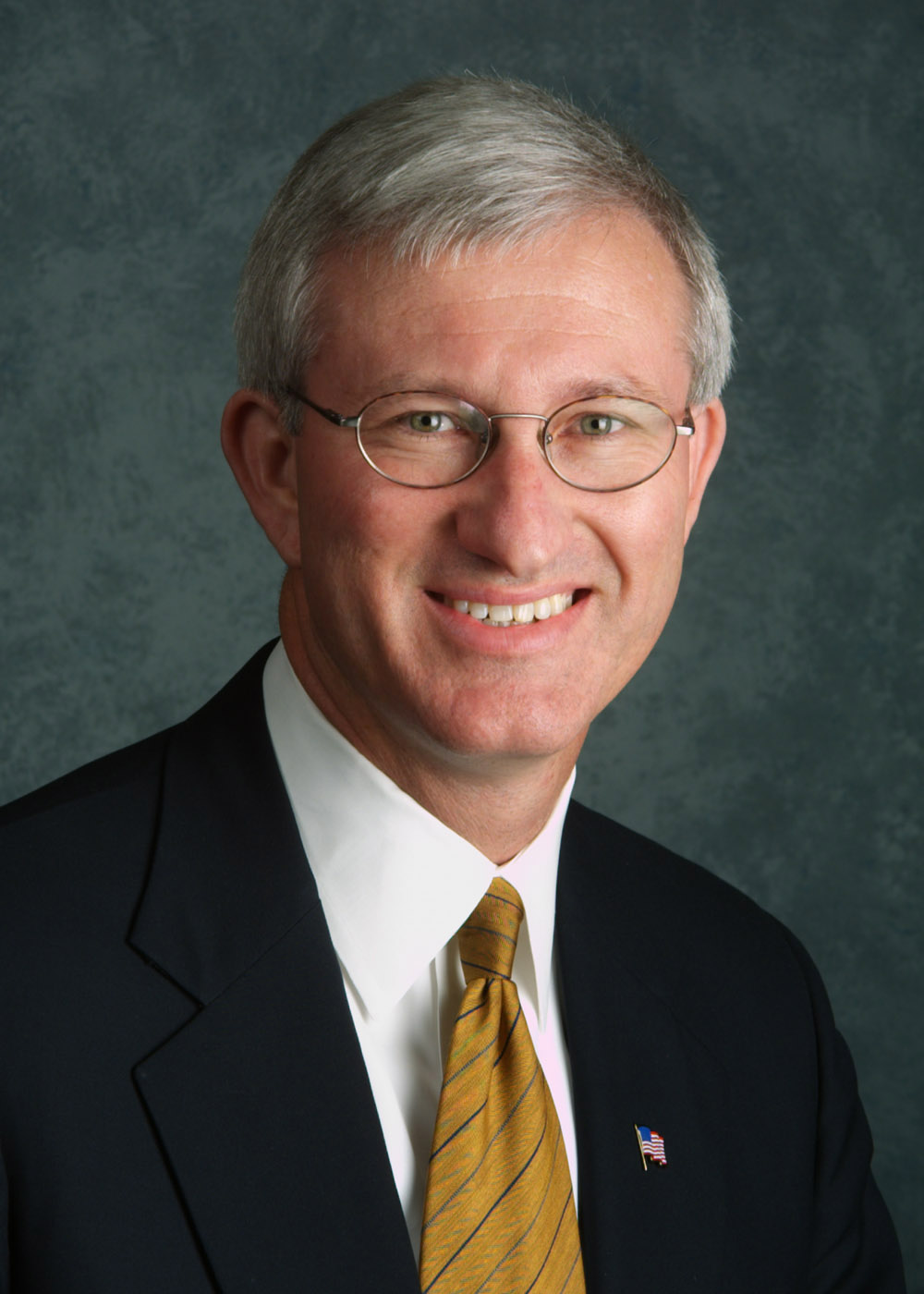

62nd Governor of Mississippi
- In office January 11, 2000 – January 13, 2004
- Lieutenant: Amy Tuck
- Preceded by: Kirk Fordice
- Succeeded by: Haley Barbour

29th Lieutenant Governor of Mississippi
- In office January 4, 1996 – January 11, 2000
- Governor: Kirk Fordice
- Preceded by: Eddie Briggs
- Succeeded by: Amy Tuck

39th Chair of the National Lieutenant Governors Association
- In office 1998–1999
- Preceded by: Mary Fallin
- Succeeded by: Olene Walker

Member of the Mississippi State Senate from the 10th district
- In office January 5, 1988 – January 2, 1996
- Preceded by: Charles Ray Nix
- Succeeded by: Nolan Mettetal

Personal details
- Born: David Ronald Musgrove; July 29, 1956 (age 70) Sardis, Mississippi, U.S.
- Party: Democratic
- Spouse(s): Melanie Ballard (m. 1977; div. 2001) Melody Bounds (m. 2007; died 2021)
- Children: 4
- Education: Northwest Mississippi Community College (attended); University of Mississippi (BA, JD)

David Ronald Musgrove (born July 29, 1956) is an American lawyer and politician who served as the 62nd governor of Mississippi from 2000 to 2004. A Democrat, he previously served as the 29th lieutenant governor of Mississippi from 1996 to 2000 under Governor Kirk Fordice. As governor, Musgrove had a conservative record.

He was the Democratic nominee in the 2008 special election for one of Mississippi's seats in the United States Senate, losing to incumbent Senator Roger Wicker.

Musgrove is a principal at a public affairs consulting firm, Politics. In 2014, he became founding partner of a new law firm in Jackson, Mississippi, Musgrove/Smith Law. As of 2026, he is the most recent Democrat to hold the office of Governor of Mississippi.

== Early life ==
David Ronald "Ronnie" Musgrove was born on July 29, 1956, in Sardis, Mississippi. He was raised in Tocowa and the city of Batesville. He had four siblings. His mother was a textile factory worker and his father was a road crew worker for the Mississippi Highway Department. When Musgrove was seven years old, his father caught pneumonia while laboring during a snowstorm and died. He attended Northwest Mississippi Junior College, the University of Mississippi, and the University of Mississippi School of Law.

== State Senate ==
In 1987, Musgrove ran for the District 10 seat of the Mississippi State Senate, representing Panola and Tate counties, which was being vacated by its incumbent. He defeated Price Darby in an August Democratic primary runoff and won the November general election. After being seated in January 1988, Musgrove was appointed vice chairman of the Senate's Universities and Colleges Committee and made a member of the Education Committee.

Despite rumors that he would seek the office of Attorney General of Mississippi in 1991, Musgrove chose to seek reelection to the Senate. He ran unopposed and was reelected. At the onset of his second term in January 1992, he was named chairman of the Education Committee.

== Lieutenant governor ==
In 1995 Musgrove ran as the Democratic candidate for the office of lieutenant governor of Mississippi, facing one-term Republican incumbent Eddie Briggs. Briggs refused to debate his opponent, and Musgrove accused him of hypocrisy for not releasing his tax returns when he had demanded the same of Brad Dye, whom he had defeated four years prior. Briggs also distanced himself from Republican Kirk Fordice's gubernatorial reelection campaign due to personal differences between the two.

On November 7, the election was held and Musgrove won, taking 52 percent of the vote. He was sworn-in as lieutenant governor on January 4, 1996. In an attempt to contrast himself from his predecessor, he began his tenure by indicating he was open to cooperation with Governor Fordice. As lieutenant governor, Musgrove was an ex officio member of the Joint Legislative Budget Committee, chairing it in 1999. His service on the board allowed him to garner significant experience in budgeting.

Shortly after being elected lieutenant governor, Musgrove was seriously injured in a car accident while traveling on official state business. After Fordice was gravely injured in a car accident, Musgrove served as acting governor from November 7 to December 17, 1996. While serving in an acting capacity in Fordice's absence, Musgrove limited his activities to signing proclamations, processing extraditions, declaring weather-related emergencies and making appointments recommended by Fordice's staff. At the time, Musgrove was quoted as saying, "When we're confronted by these types of matters, politics has to be put on the back burner and we have to do the right thing."

After taking office, Musgrove named Black senators to chair several Senate committees, including those concerning the judiciary, constitution, elections, and universities and colleges.

Differences later emerged between Fordice and Musgrove over the latter's support of public education. After the governor vetoed the Mississippi Adequate Education Act in 1987, Musgrove lobbied for the legislature to override Fordice's decision.

In 1998 Musgrove chaired the National Conference of Lieutenant Governors. After the 1999 elections but before the official end of his tenure, Musgrove turned over the lieutenant governor's offices to Lieutenant Governor-elect Amy Tuck so as to ease her assumption of the position.

== Governor of Mississippi ==
=== 1999 election ===
Musgrove ran for the office of governor in 1999, having hired a full-time fundraiser and a political consultant to mount such a campaign two years prior. He won the August 3 Democratic primary, taking 57 percent of the vote and defeating former state Supreme Court justice Jim Roberts, though Roberts had damaged his credibility by questioning his use of state vehicles for campaign activities. In the general election he faced Republican former U.S. Representative Mike Parker.

Musgrove focused on education advancements, running a series of television ads showcasing his accomplishments as lieutenant governor in supporting elementary and secondary school improvements. He also ran a significant amount of campaign ads on Christian radio stations and espoused socially conservative positions such as opposition to abortion. Parker largely campaigned on his personality, focusing on his background in Mississippi and his experience in government. As a result, Musgrove criticized him for being "issueless", to which Parker responded that he was not "going to play this gotcha politics."

Musgrove also spent a significant amount of time traveling and hosting events while his campaign staff innovated with using traffic density maps to strategically place campaign signs and deployed get out the vote efforts in every county. In contrast, Parker relied largely on his radio and television ads to promote his campaign. During the last week of the campaign, Musgrove continued attending events while his campaign printed newspaper ads which attacked Parker for depriving rural hospitals of funding by voting in favor of the Balanced Budget Act of 1997, generating a significant amount of public interest. The congressman in turn played at a charity golf tournament during the last day before the election.

The 1999 gubernatorial election was the closest in Mississippi history; Musgrove earned an advantage in the popular vote, taking 379,033 votes to Parker's 370,691. As there were two minor independent candidates, Musgrove fell 0.38 percent short of receiving a majority as required by the Constitution of Mississippi. Since neither candidate received a majority of the popular vote, had each won 61 of the state's 122 electoral districts (state house districts), and Parker refused to concede, the Mississippi House of Representatives was required to hold a contingent election to select the winner. On January 4, 2000, the House convened and voted in favor of seating Musgrove, 86 to 36, in a mostly partisan vote. It was the only time the election of a Mississippi governor was decided by the Mississippi House, as a 2020 referendum abolished the electoral vote requirement and replaced a contingent election with a runoff election between the top two candidates.

=== Tenure ===
Due to the short time frame between his election as governor and the date of his inauguration on January 11, 2000, Musgrove entered gubernatorial office with an incomplete staff. He entered office with the intent to reform government institutions, specifically public education.

As Governor, Musgrove served as chair or vice chair of a number of boards and associations, including the National Governors Association (vice chair), the Southern Regional Education Board (chair), the Southern States Energy Board (chair elect), the National Board for Professional Teaching Standards (chair elect) and the Executive Committee for the Democratic Governors Association (vice chair of policy).

As governor, Musgrove presided over what is still considered the largest economic development project in Mississippi history. In August 2000, he launched the Advantage Mississippi Initiative (AMI) to create new jobs for the state, which brought in a new Nissan Motor Company production plant. Nissan's arrival gave legitimacy to the notion that the Southeastern United States could become an automotive manufacturing leader. Musgrove's AMI economic development package also helped set in motion the mechanics needed to recruit Toyota to Blue Springs.

In 2000, Musgrove signed a bill into law banning same-sex couples from adopting children, making Mississippi only the third state to have done so. The law also says that Mississippi will not recognize adoptions from other states by same-sex couples.

Beginning in the 1980s, Mississippi lawyers won a series of large damage suits against corporations, resulting in large payouts to the plaintiffs they represented and significant profits for the attorneys. As a result, damage suit attorneys' political influence increased and by the early 2000s were one of the largest sources of campaign contributions for Democratic candidates in the state. In response, the business community began increasingly funding pro-tort reform candidates who would support new limits on the lawsuits. In late 2001, the press began to publish exposes on the damage suit attorneys, which, combined with a series of lawsuits against hospitals and medical practices, led to increased public support for reform. On August 23, 2002, Musgrove announced to a group of campaign contributors—all of them trial lawyers—his intention to call the legislature into special session to consider tort reform proposals. When asked for his reasons, Musgrove told them that he was under intense political pressure to act.

The tort reform special session opened on September 5. By the time it closed on November 26, it was the longest-lasting special session in Mississippi history. The legislature adopted several new laws restricting damage suits, including caps on punitive damages in cases involving businesses and instances of medical malpractice. Despite the success of the session he had called, Musgrove garnered no obvious political advantage from the enactment of the reforms, and Democrats' fundraising efforts in the state were left compromised.

=== 2003 election ===
In 2003 Musgrove ran for re-election, facing Republican challenger Haley Barbour. Musgrove targeted his critiques of his opponent on the latter's career as a lobbyist. Barbour defeated Musgrove in the general election.

== Later political activities ==
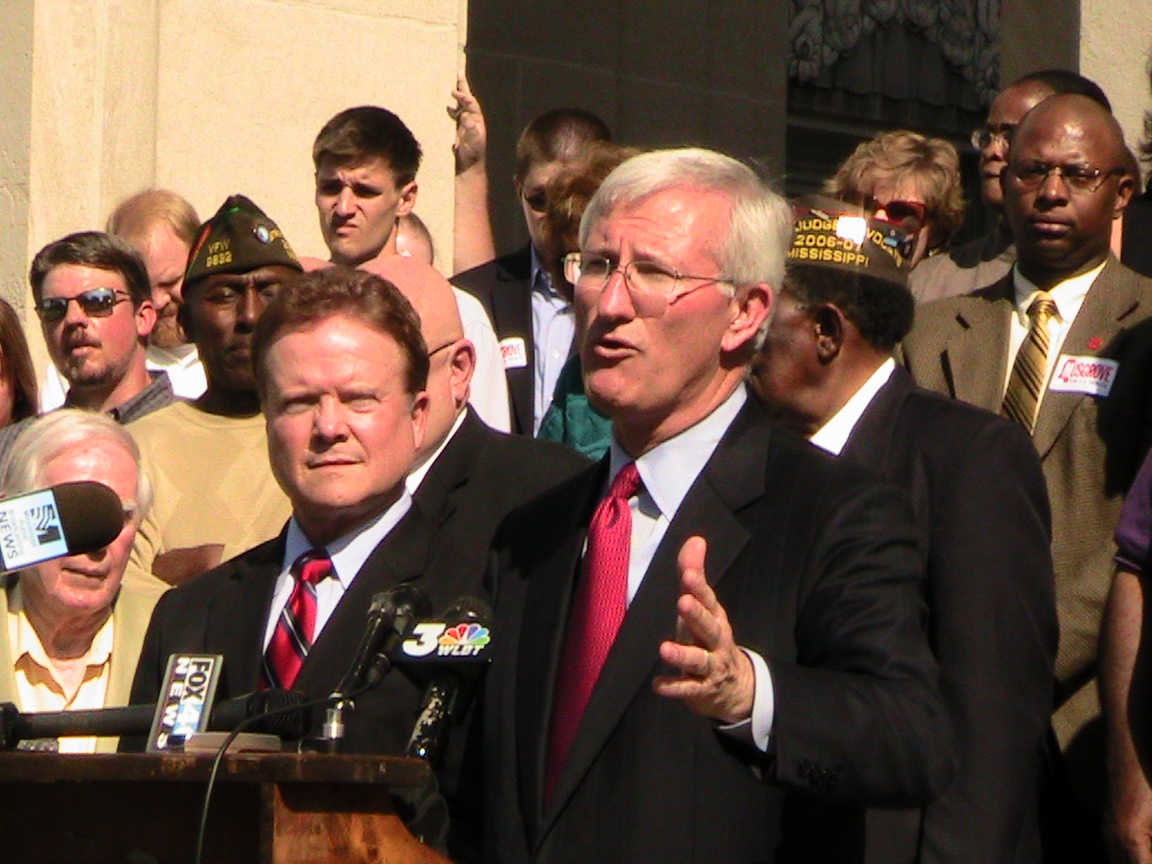
Musgrove campaigning for the U.S. Senate with Jim Webb in Jackson, Mississippi

After losing his re-election bid Musgrove returned to private practice with the law firm of Copeland, Cook, Taylor & Bush, P.A. in Ridgeland, Mississippi. On January 4, 2008, Musgrove confirmed that he would be a candidate in the 2008 United States Senate special election in Mississippi against Republican incumbent Roger Wicker. Wicker, a former congressman, was appointed to the Senate seat by Governor Barbour after Trent Lott resigned.

Musgrove initially led in statewide polling conducted in April due to his greater name recognition. Wicker eroded this lead by associating himself with conservative causes and attacking Musgrove as a liberal who had provoked budget issues during his gubernatorial administration and attempted to alter the state flag. Musgrove in turn attacked Wicker for voting to raise congressional salaries. The Democratic Senatorial Campaign Committee, optimistic about a high black Democratic-leaning turnout during the election due to Barack Obama's presidential candidacy, intervened to launch television attack ads against Wicker, though Wicker also benefitted from outside Republican financial support. Late in the race, polls indicated Wicker had a sizeable lead, though The Clarion-Ledger endorsed Musgrove, citing his support of education and child healthcare. Wicker won with 55 percent of the vote.

Musgrove has remained active in public service since leaving office, continuing to serve on a number of boards and commissions that advocate for quality education and better access to health care for rural and low income families. In February 2013, Musgrove joined a former aide in launching a government relations consulting firm, Company.Politics.

== Political views ==
As governor, Musgrove had conservative social views, enacting laws restricting homosexual couples from adopting children and requiring that the motto "In God We Trust" appear in all classrooms in Mississippi. He also had an anti-abortion record as governor.

=== Education ===
During his tenure, Musgrove was known as the education governor. In July 2001, Governor Musgrove signed a bill that implemented the largest teacher pay increase in state history—raising teacher's pay in Mississippi to the Southeastern average. Under Governor Musgrove, the Princeton Review reported that school accountability standards in Mississippi went from 50th nationally to the top 20. In 2002, Mississippi was the first state in the nation to have a computer with internet access in every classroom.

=== Healthcare ===
When Governor Musgrove took office in January 2000, fewer than 525 Mississippi children were enrolled in Children's Health Insurance Program (CHIP). At the time, Mississippi had more than 85,000 children that were eligible to receive health insurance benefits through the Mississippi Health Benefits Program, which provides health insurance to Mississippi's children whose parents are caught in the gap between making too much money to be eligible for Medicaid, but not enough to afford health insurance. Governor Musgrove joined with the Department of Human Services, the Division of Medicaid and the Department of Finance and Administration to develop a new action plan and marketing plan for CHIP. By the time he left office, the number of children covered under CHIP had increased to over 60,000. Governor Musgrove is currently chairman of the National Advisory Committee on Rural Health and Human Services, and co-chairman of the Biomass Research and Development Technical Advisory Committee.

=== Religion ===
In August 2003, Musgrove wrote Alabama Supreme Court judge Roy Moore on state letterhead to praise the judge's Ten Commandments monument, inviting the judge to display the monument in the Mississippi State Capitol for a week the following month and announcing his intention to encourage other governors to follow suit. Musgrove further wrote, "It would be my honor to host this monument as a symbol of every Mississippian's dedication to the fundamental principles of the Ten Commandments."

In 2001, Musgrove signed legislation requiring the motto "In God We Trust" to be displayed in every public school classroom, as well as the school auditoriums and cafeterias, throughout the state.

=== Mississippi state flag ===
Mississippi's state flag featured the Confederate Battle Flag prominently. In 2000, the Supreme Court of Mississippi ruled that the Mississippi flag, a source of division among white and black Mississippians, was not official. A court ruled the flag was officially adopted in 1894, but the law designating the state flag was not among those carried forward in a 1906 update of the state code. The judges left the decision on whether to adopt the flag to the legislative and executive branches.

In response to the ruling, Musgrove held a press conference to announce that he had issued an executive order creating a 17-member commission to study the flag. In the executive order, Musgrove also called for continuing the use of the flag until the legislature had received and reviewed the committee's report. During the press conference, flanked by a U.S. flag and the controversial state flag, Musgrove offered no indication of his opinion on the current flag or any possible future design.

The commission eventually came up with a new design that replaced the battle flag in the canton with a circular array of twenty stars (Mississippi is the 20th state) on a blue background. As campaigning for the flags began leading up to a referendum, Musgrove did endorse the new flag. A referendum was held in April 2001 to determine whether the new flag would be adopted. The 1894 flag won by a vote of 65% to 35%.

== Personal life ==
In 1977 Musgrove married Melanie Ballard. In 2001, while Musgrove was governor, the couple divorced after 24 years of marriage. The couple had two children. The results and settlement of the divorce were sealed by the judge at the request of the Musgroves. Musgrove married Dr. Melody Bruce Bounds on August 4, 2007. Melody Musgrove died of leukemia at the Mayo Clinic in Rochester, Minnesota on September 27, 2021. He also teaches classes at his alma mater, the University of Mississippi in Oxford, Mississippi, as well as at Mississippi College School of Law in Jackson, Mississippi.

== Works cited ==
- Breaux, David A.; Shaffer, Stephen D. (2010). "Mississippi : Democrats Fight For Relevance in an Increasingly Republican State". A Paler Shade of Red: The 2008 Presidential Election in the South. University of Arkansas Press. ISBN 9781610750035.
- Bullock, Charles S.; Rozell, Mark J., eds. (2010). The New Politics of the Old South: An Introduction to Southern Politics. Rowman & Littlefield. ISBN 9780742570214.
- Nash, Jere; Taggart, Andy (2009). Mississippi Politics: The Struggle for Power, 1976-2008 (second ed.). University Press of Mississippi. ISBN 9781604733570.
- Pugh, Brian A. (2020). Chaos and Compromise: The Evolution of the Mississippi Budgeting Process. University Press of Mississippi. ISBN 9781496830227.
- Sansing, David G. (2016). Mississippi Governors: Soldiers, Statesmen, Scholars, Scoundrels (first ed.). Oxford: Nautilus Publishing Company. ISBN 978-1-936946-81-5.
- Watson, Robert P.; Campbell, Colton C., eds. (2003). Campaigns and Elections: Issues, Concepts, Cases. Lynne Rienner Publishers. ISBN 9781588261441.

Party political offices
Preceded by Brad Dye	Democratic nominee for Lieutenant Governor of Mississippi; 1995	Succeeded by Amy Tuck
Preceded by Dick Molpus	Democratic nominee for Governor of Mississippi; 1999, 2003	Succeeded by John Arthur Eaves Jr.
Preceded by Erik Fleming	Democratic nominee for U.S. Senator from Mississippi (Class 1); 2008	Succeeded by Albert Gore
Political offices
Preceded by Eddie Briggs	Lieutenant Governor of Mississippi; 1996–2000	Succeeded by Amy Tuck
Preceded by Kirk Fordice	Governor of Mississippi; 2000–2004	Succeeded by Haley Barbour
U.S. order of precedence (ceremonial)
Preceded by Ray Mabus as Former Governor	Order of precedence of the United States	Succeeded by Haley Barbour as Former Governor
