= John Arthur Eaves Jr. =

American attorney and politician

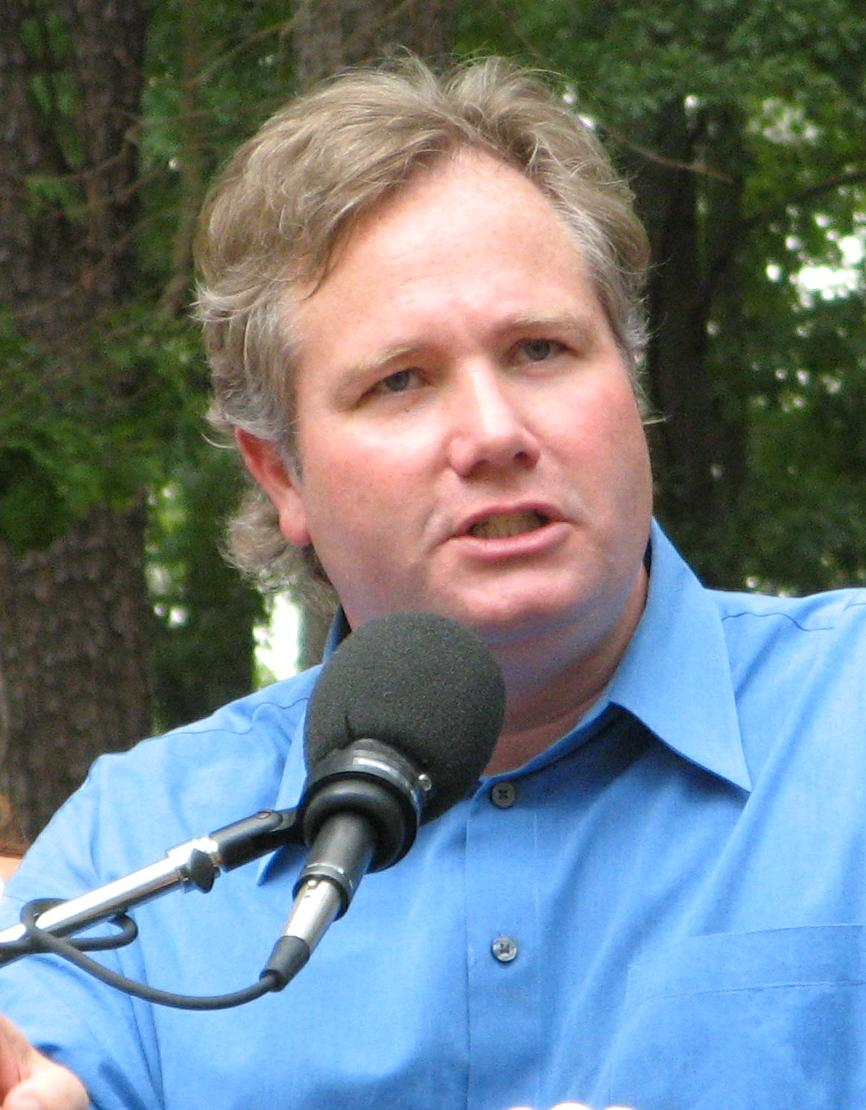
- Eaves in 2007

Personal details
- Born: September 6, 1966 (age 59) Jackson, Mississippi, U.S.
- Party: Democratic
- Spouse: Angel Eaves
- Children: 4
- Education: University of Mississippi (BA, JD)

John Arthur Eaves Jr. (born September 6, 1966) is an American attorney and politician. He was the unsuccessful Democratic Party nominee in the 2007 general election for Governor of Mississippi.

== Early life ==
John Arthur Eaves Jr. was born on September 6, 1966, in Jackson, Mississippi. His father, John Arthur Eaves Sr., was a successful trial lawyer who launched three unsuccessful candidacies for Mississippi gubernatorial office. He graduated from Clinton High School in 1984 and went on to receive a bachelor's degree and Juris Doctor degree from the University of Mississippi. He married Karen Denise Lindley in 1991. They had three sons before divorcing. Eaves then married Angel Ainsworth, who had a son from a previous marriage, in 2006.

== Legal career ==
John Arthur Eaves Jr. began practicing law with his father after receiving his Juris Doctor degree from the University of Mississippi School of Law. As a trial lawyer, he has represented thousands of Mississippians in legal cases involving asbestos, pharmaceutical drugs, nursing home care, and complaints involving insurance companies.

Eaves also has been involved in several international cases. One concerned an incident in Cavalese, Italy, where a U.S. Marine plane severed a cable car line at a ski resort in northern Italy, killing 20 people; Eaves represented five German families and a Polish family. He also represented the nation of Ukraine against U.S. tobacco companies, suing for hundreds of millions of dollars.

Ongoing cases include Eaves' representation of U.S. soldiers with claims of suffering from complications as a result of the initial Gulf War, and of American nationals in Kenya against Osama bin Laden, several Islamic organizations, and the government of Sudan for the 1998 American embassy bombings in Nairobi and Kenya.

=== Sanchez v. US, ===
On September 5, 2007, the Eaves Law Firm filed suit against the United States Navy on behalf of 7,125 US citizens who live on the island of Vieques, Puerto Rico in the United States District Court for the District of Columbia in the case Sanchez v. US. In the suit the Eaves Law Firm is helping the people of Vieques recover for the harm done to them as a result of contamination caused by over sixty years of Naval live fire training on the Island. In 2001 President Bush announced the Navy would end live fire exercises on the Island in 2003. At that time Bush stated, "There's been some harm done to people in the past. These are our friends and neighbors, and they don't want us there."

On February 11, 2005, two years after the Navy ceased operations, the United States Environmental Protection Agency listed the former Naval facility as a CERCLA Superfund site due to the widespread contamination left by the Navy. Scientific studies have discovered a link between the widespread contamination, which resulted from heavy metals, toxins, and other contaminates which bioaccumulated over the years, and a significantly higher rate of cancer, hypertension, diabetes, cirrhosis of the liver, low birth rate, and infant mortality on the Island.

Some of those for whom the suit seeks to recover damages include the family of Milivy Adams. Milivy Adams was only two years old when her first tumor was removed from her head, however, there were other tumors on her kidney, left hand, left leg, and shoulders. Milivy Adams died of her lymphoma at the age of five. Eaves has stated the goal of the suit as following, "We want them to have enough money so each family can decide the best way to protect themselves. The Navy stated that it would honor its commitment to repair the injury to the health of the people—as long as we proved our case. And we're going to continue working to make sure that they honor their commitment."

== Political career ==
=== 1996 congressional campaign ===
In 1996 Eaves ran for the U.S. House of Representatives seat from Mississippi's 3rd congressional district. Defeating two other candidates in the Democratic primary, he faced former U.S. Senate aide Chip Pickering in the general election. Pickering won with 61 percent of the vote.

=== 2003 gubernatorial campaign ===
In 2002, Eaves funded a television attack ad which criticized Democratic Governor Ronnie Musgrove for pushing a tort reform bill through the legislature which limited pain and suffering damage awards in malpractice lawsuits. On February 24, 2003, he announced that he would challenge Musgrove in the Democratic primary for the 2003 Mississippi gubernatorial election, saying he was disappointed in the governor's "wishy-washy decision-making process." He dropped out of the race on April 8, citing concerns about spending time away from his family, leaving Musgrove with no significant primary challengers.

=== 2007 gubernatorial campaign ===
Eaves declared his candidacy in the 2007 Mississippi gubernatorial election in January 2007 in Tupelo. He won the Democratic primary on August 7, 2007, defeating challengers William Compton, Fred Smith, and Louis Fondren. In the general election he faced incumbent Republican Governor Haley Barbour. Eaves' campaign focused on Biblical themes, with him saying he was running "to serve his Creator". One of his television ads showed him clutching a Bible while speaking with prospective voters. He accused Barbour of being beholden to special interest groups and, alluding to the Bible, "money changers". Barbour out-fundraised Eaves, who mostly self-funded his campaign.

Eaves also advocated voluntary student prayer in the classroom, cutting the grocery tax, covering every juvenile in the state with health care and an end to abortion. On Katrina, Eaves criticized Barbour for not doing enough for the 7,000 Mississippians who were still living in FEMA trailers.

Eaves also expressed concerns regarding the state's growing Latino population. When Governor Haley Barbour stated that "We have a lot of Spanish people that are here and I don't know what we would have done without them on the coast," Eaves responded: "I know where we'd be. We could have record employment instead of the highest unemployment in the South." Because Barbour's statement applied to both undocumented immigrants and Latinos living in the country legally under H2B work visas, some commentators viewed Eaves' remarks as racist.

On Tuesday, November 6, 2007, Eaves lost to Barbour, winning only 42 percent of the vote. Barbour took 430,807 votes to Eaves' 313,232 votes. Eaves' vote total was nearly 100,000 votes less than the Democratic gubernatorial candidate in 2003 and the lowest vote total a Democrat had earned in a gubernatorial election since before blacks' voting rights were protected in 1965. Eaves won a majority in 28 of the state's 82 counties. Of these, only five were white-majority counties, and he lost two black-majority counties to Barbour.

== Works cited ==
- Nash, Jere; Taggart, Andy (2009). Mississippi Politics: The Struggle for Power, 1976-2008 (second ed.). University Press of Mississippi. ISBN 9781604733570.

Party political offices
| Preceded by Ronnie Musgrove | Democratic nominee for Governor of Mississippi; 2007 | Succeeded by Johnny DuPree |
