= Amy Tuck =

American attorney and politician

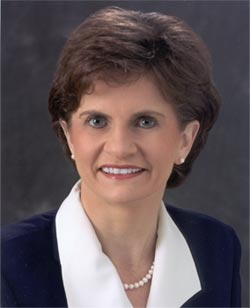

30th Lieutenant Governor of Mississippi
- In office January 11, 2000 – January 10, 2008
- Governor: Ronnie Musgrove; Haley Barbour
- Preceded by: Ronnie Musgrove
- Succeeded by: Phil Bryant

Member of the Mississippi State Senate
- In office January 8, 1991 – January 2, 1996
- Preceded by: Bill Harpole
- Succeeded by: Glenn Hamilton
- Constituency: 16th district (1991–1992); 15th district (1992–1996)

Personal details
- Born: July 8, 1963 (age 63) Maben, Mississippi, U.S.
- Party: Democratic (Before 2002); Republican (2002–present)
- Education: Mississippi State University; Mississippi College

Amy Tuck (born July 8, 1963) is an American attorney and politician who served as the 30th Lieutenant Governor of Mississippi from 2000 to 2008. A member of the Republican Party, she was previously a member of the Mississippi State Senate. She is the second woman to be elected to statewide office in Mississippi, and the first to have been reelected. Tuck later served as the Vice President of Campus Services at Mississippi State University from 2008 to 2019.

== Biography ==
Tuck was born in Maben, Oktibbeha County, Mississippi in 1963. Her father, Grady Tuck, ran a grocery store near Maben, and was a lifelong friend of politician Brad Dye. As a high school student in Starkville, she also served as a page in the Mississippi Legislature. She received Bachelor of Arts in political science and Master of Public Administration degrees from Mississippi State University in Starkville before obtaining a J.D. degree from Mississippi College School of Law in Jackson. After graduating, Tuck worked as an attorney and as a teacher at a junior college.

On December 18, 1990, she defeated Bryce Griffis in a special election (called after the death of incumbent senator Bill Harpole) to the Mississippi State Senate as a Democrat, representing the 16th District, comprising parts of Choctaw, Montgomery, Oktibbeha, and Webster counties. At age 27, Tuck was the youngest-ever woman to serve in the Mississippi State Senate. In 1995, she was an unsuccessful candidate for Secretary of State, narrowly losing the Democratic primary to eventual winner Eric Clark. Following her defeat, she served as secretary of the Mississippi Senate from 1995 to 1999. Tuck was elected lieutenant governor in 1999, defeating Republican state senator Bill Hawks.

In 2002, Tuck announced her intention to qualify for reelection as a Republican, effectively switching parties. In her announcement, she cited ongoing disagreement with the Democratic state legislature concerning redistricting as well as her conservative stances on abortion, same-sex marriage, and criminal justice reform as motivating factors for her decision to switch parties. The next year, in 2003, she was nominated as the Republican candidate for lieutenant governor and went on to defeat former Democratic state senator Barbara Blackmon in the general election with 61% of the vote. Due to term limits, Tuck was ineligible for reelection as lieutenant governor in 2007. She was succeeded by Phil Bryant on January 10, 2008.

In October 2007 it was announced that Tuck would be appointed as special assistant to Mississippi State University President Doc Foglesong upon expiration of her term as lieutenant governor. In this role, Tuck took a leading role in facilitating the university's economic development and private sector initiatives. Upon the retirement of Foglesong in March 2008 and the selection of Mark E. Keenum as his successor, Tuck was named the Vice President of Campus Services, a new position. In this position she oversees the university's facilities, parking and transit, sustainability, planning, and utilities divisions. Tuck announced in October 2019 that she would retire from her position as vice president on December 31, 2019, and was succeeded by former MSU finance head Don Zant.

== See also ==
- List of female lieutenant governors in the United States
- List of American politicians who switched parties in office

Party political offices
Preceded by Ronnie Musgrove	Democratic nominee for Lieutenant Governor of Mississippi; 1999	Succeeded by Barbara Blackmon
Preceded by Bill Hawks	Republican nominee for Lieutenant Governor of Mississippi; 2003	Succeeded by Phil Bryant
Political offices
Preceded by Ronnie Musgrove	Lieutenant Governor of Mississippi; 2000–2008	Succeeded by Phil Bryant
