= Southern States Energy Board =

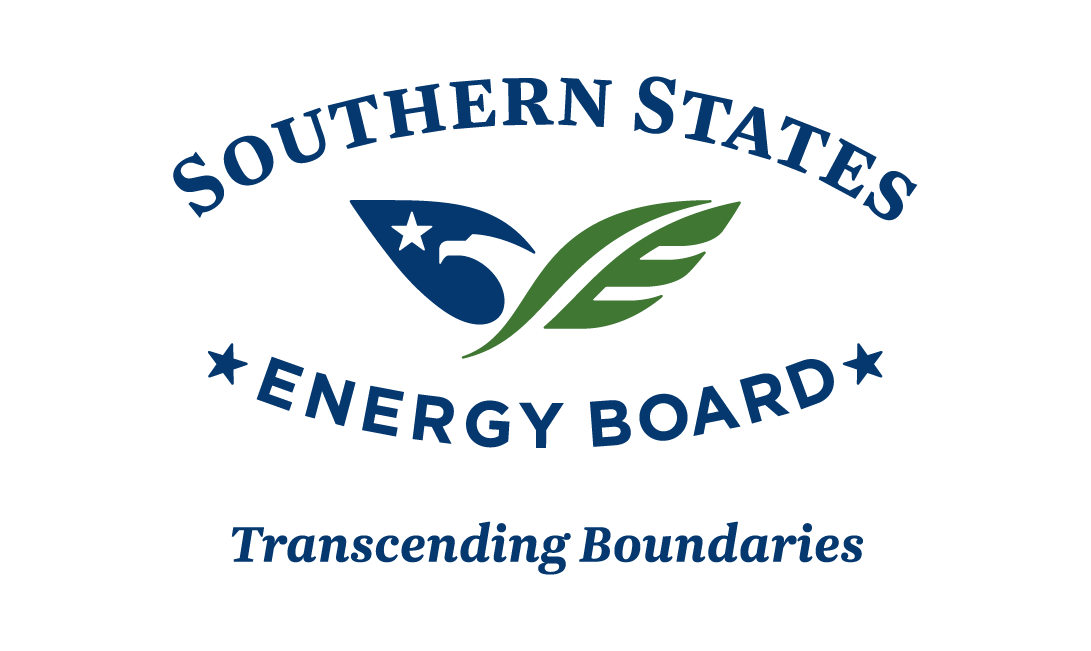
Southern States Energy Board's current logo

The Southern States Energy Board (SSEB) is a multi-state regional organization created by an interstate compact approved by sixteen states and two United States territories. The board is committed to promoting economic development and quality of life in the Southern United States through innovations in energy and the environment. Constituent members include Alabama, Arkansas, Florida, Georgia, Kentucky, Louisiana, Maryland, Mississippi, Missouri, North Carolina, Oklahoma, Puerto Rico, South Carolina, Tennessee, Texas, United States Virgin Islands, Virginia, and West Virginia.

== Early history ==
The creation of the SSEB can be traced to the Southern Governors Conference meeting in Point Clear, Alabama, which, on October 20, 1955, approved the "Point Clear Plan" whereby Southern states would coordinate the possible development of civilian uses of nuclear energy in the region. The agreement led to Florida Governor LeRoy Collins convening a preliminary energy conference on January 25, 1956, in Oak Ridge, Tennessee. Also attended by Tennessee Governor Frank Clement, representatives of fifteen Southern and Border states, as well as nuclear energy experts, additional meetings were held at Raleigh, North Carolina; Aiken, South Carolina, and Miami, Florida. Under the auspices of the Southern Regional Education Board (SREB), Gov. Collins convened a "Work Conference on Nuclear Energy" at Redington Beach, Florida on August 1, 1956, which urged Southern governors to create "statewide atomic energy citizens advisory committees."

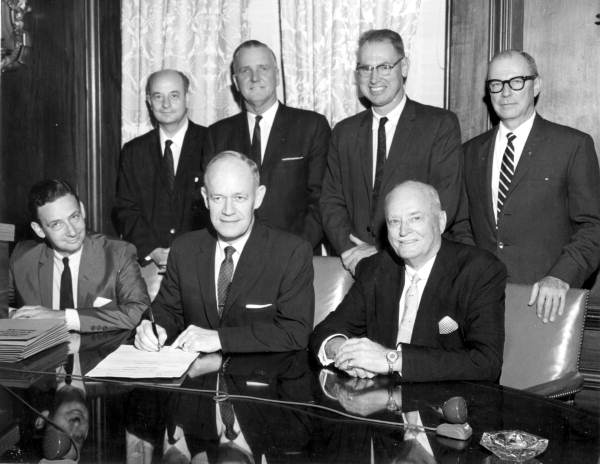
Florida Governor C. Farris Bryant signs Southern Interstate Nuclear Compact, 1961

These efforts resulted in the creation of a Regional Advisory Council on Nuclear Energy (RACNE), which first convened in Atlanta on February 1–2, 1957, with representatives from 14 states in attendance. Administrative support for the Council, originally provided by SREB, was transferred to the Council of State Governments' regional office.

On June 17, 1961, the Southern Interstate Nuclear Compact went into effect, with Florida being the seventh state to join. By September 1961, with eight states having ratified a proposed interstate compact, RACNE became the Southern Interstate Nuclear Board (SINB), the precursor to the SSEB, which then was officially sanctioned by enactment of Public Law 87-563, filed by Tennessee Senator Albert Gore Sr. and signed into law by President John F. Kennedy on July 31, 1962.

The Southern Governors Conference has revised the board's mission and charter over the years. On October 4, 1962, they were expanded to include space exploration. In June, 1968, they were further expanded to include applications of nuclear and space technology in oceanography, environmental sciences, biomedical technology and other areas. In 1972, there was a substantial revision, charging the board to consider all aspects of energy, including conservation. Corresponding to this expanded mission, the organization's by-laws were amended to change its name to Southern States Energy Board on February 10, 1978.

== Reorganization ==
While the board changed its name to Southern States Energy Board in the belief that it had the authority to do so, the Southern Legislative Conference disagreed and sought to have state legislatures represented on the board. In 1978, the board collaborated with the Council of State Governments and the Arkansas Legislative Council to draft a set of amendments to formalize the name change, expand the mission to include energy and environmental issues, and incorporate legislative representatives onto the board. The amendments were to become effective upon adoption by nine states and the approval of Congress; by 1981, the amendments had been adopted by nine states.

== Programs ==
The board engages in a portfolio of projects and programs in geoscience, engineering, and nuclear energy, as well as legislative monitoring and other partnerships.

== Funding ==
In 2025, the board received revenue and support of about $18 million, mostly from state subgrants on behalf of member states and universities, cooperative agreements, public-private partnerships, and other projects. The Board is funded by a combination of appropriations from member governments, research project support from the United States Departments of Energy and Defense, and contributions from associate members in industry and other nongovernmental organizations. Annual member appropriations, held constant since 1987, range from $25,000 to $55,000. Contributions from the approximately 60 associate members totaled $170,000.

== Leaders of the Organization ==
Southern Interstate Nuclear Board

- Frank Norton 1961–64
- Lawrence R. Quarles 1964–66
- John B. Breckinridge 1966-67
- John J. McKetta Jr. 1967–68
- Victor S. Johnson Jr. 1968–70
- Daniel S. Eppelsheimer 1970–72
- Howard R. Drew 1972–73
- Don S. Smith 1973–74
- Peter J. Chenery 1974–75
- Pete B. Turnham 1975–78

Southern States Energy Board

- Lamar E. Priester Jr. 1978–80
- Sam Hammons 1980–81
- Gov. John Y. Brown Jr. 1981–82
- Gov. David C. Treen 1982–84
- Gov. Mark White 1984–85
- Gov. Martha Layne Collins 1985–86
- Gov. Gerald L. Baliles 1986–87
- Gov. Arch A. Moore Jr. 1987–88
- Gov. Henry Bellmon 1988–89
- Gov. Bob Martinez 1989–90
- Gov. Carroll A. Campbell Jr. 1990–91
- Gov. David Walters 1991–92
- Gov. Lawton Chiles 1992–93
- Gov. Jim Guy Tucker 1993–94
- Gov. Brereton C. Jones 1994–95
- Gov. Pedro J. Rosselló 1995–96
- Gov. Kirk Fordice 1996–97
- Gov. Cecil B. Underwood 1997–98
- Gov. Frank Keating 1998–99
- Gov. James S. Gilmore 1999–2000
- Gov. Jim Hodges 2000–01
- Gov. Ronnie Musgrove 2001–02
- Gov. Bob Wise 2002–04
- Gov. Ernie Fletcher 2004–06
- Gov. Joe Manchin, III 2006–08
- Gov. Sonny Perdue 2008–09
- Gov. Joe Manchin, III 2009–10
- Gov. Robert McDonnell 2010–11
- Gov. Mary Fallin 2011–12
- Gov. Phil Bryant 2012–13
- Gov. Robert J. Bentley 2013–14
- Gov. Earl Ray Tomblin 2014–15
- Gov. Asa Hutchinson 2015–17
- Gov. Phil Bryant 2017–18
- Gov. Matt Bevin 2018–19
- Gov. Kevin Stitt 2019–21
- Gov. Henry McMaster 2021–23
- Gov. Bill Lee 2023–24
- Gov. Kay Ivey 2024–2025
- Gov. Tate Reeves 2025–present

== Sources ==
Southern States Energy Board: A Golden Anniversary History of Service to the Southern Region, by Dr. Canter Brown Jr. and Kenneth J. Nemeth, Published 2010 by Southern States Energy Board, ISBN 978-0-615-38187-9
