= 2007 Mississippi gubernatorial election =

- November 6, 2007
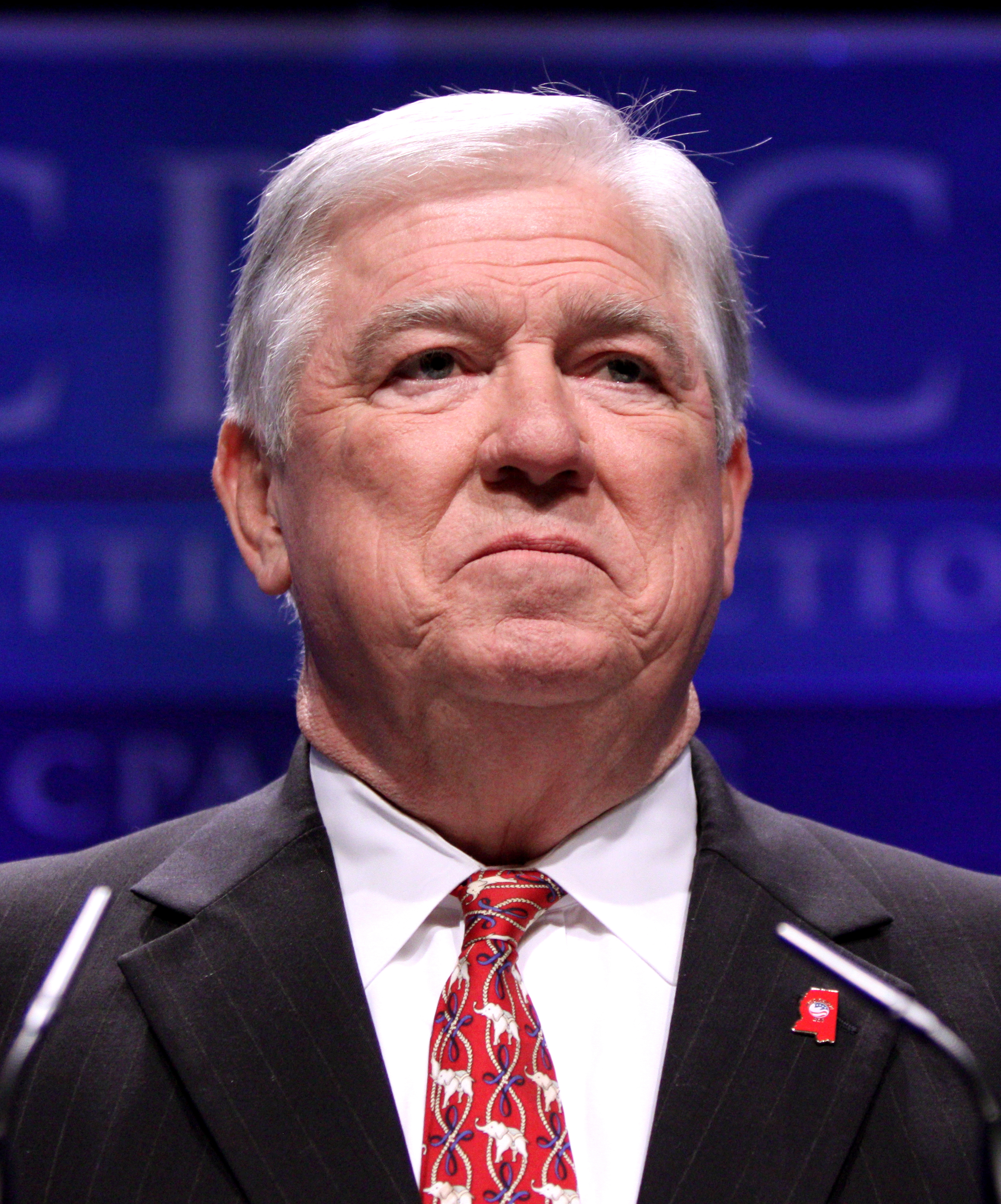

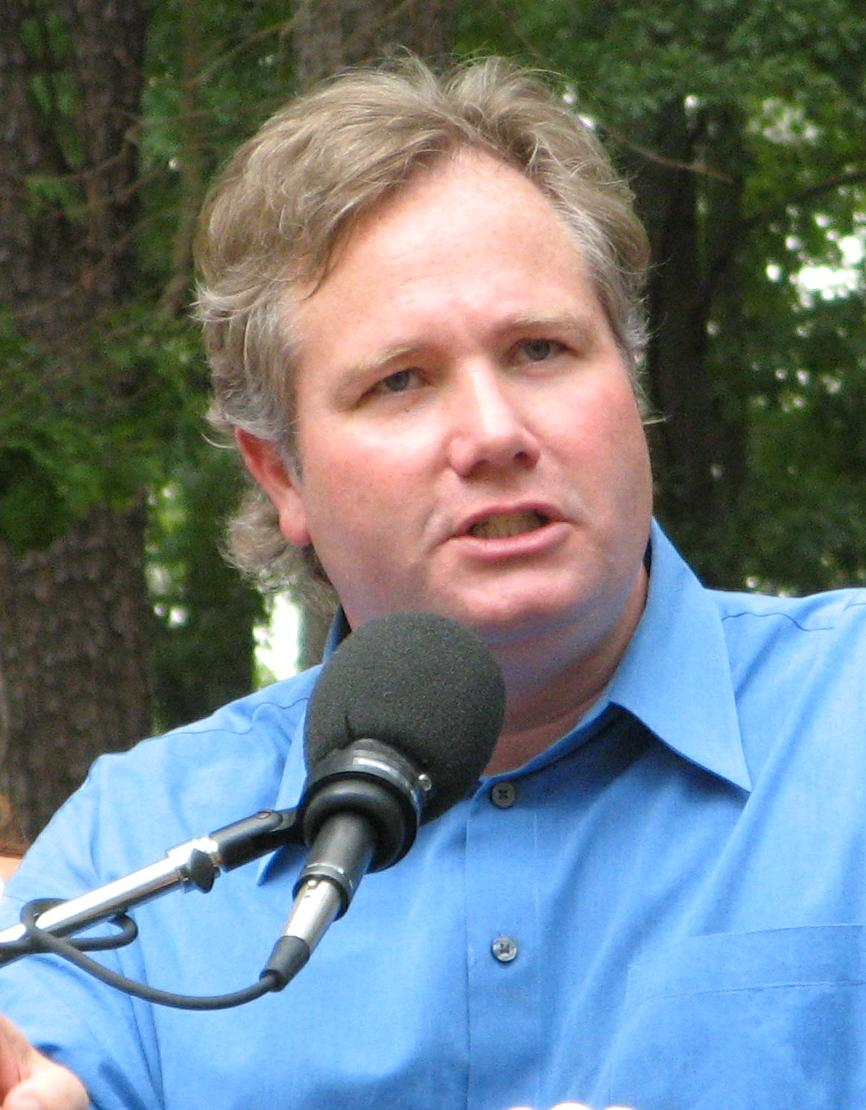
Nominee	Haley Barbour	John Arthur Eaves Jr.
Party	Republican	Democratic
Electoral vote	78	44
Popular vote	430,807	313,232
Percentage	57.90%	42.10%
- County results Barbour: 50–60% 60–70% 70–80% Eaves: 50–60% 60–70% 70–80%
Governor before election
Haley Barbour
Republican
Elected Governor
Haley Barbour
Republican

The 2007 Mississippi gubernatorial election was held on Tuesday, November 6. Incumbent Haley Barbour was re-elected to serve a four-year term as governor of Mississippi from January 15, 2008, through January 10, 2012. The Lieutenant Governor of Mississippi is also on the ballot and elected for the same time period. This was the first time that Panola County voted Republican for governor since 1873 and Yalobusha County did so for the first time ever.

== Republican primary ==
=== Candidates ===
- Haley Barbour, incumbent governor
- Frederick Jones

=== Results ===
Republican primary results
Party	Candidate	Votes	%
Republican	Haley Barbour (incumbent)	184,036	93.11
Republican	Frederick Jones	13,611	6.89
Total votes		197,647	100

== Democratic primary ==
=== Candidates ===
- William Compton, teacher
- John Arthur Eaves Jr., attorney
- Louis Fondren, former Mississippi State Representative, former mayor of Moss Point
- Fred Smith

=== Results ===
Results by county Map legend: Eaves—80–90%; Eaves—70–80%; Eaves—60–70%; Eaves—50–60%; Eaves—40–50%; Eaves—30–40%; Smith—30–40%

Democratic primary results
Party	Candidate	Votes	%
Democratic	John Arthur Eaves, Jr.	314,012	70.29
Democratic	William Compton	52,343	11.72
Democratic	Fred Smith	49,170	11.01
Democratic	Louis Fondren	31,197	6.98
Total votes		446,722	100

== General election ==
=== Polling ===
Source	Date	Haley Barbour (R)	John Eaves (D)
Mississippi Education Association	April 7, 2007	50%	35%

=== Predictions ===
Source	Ranking	As of
Sabato's Crystal Ball	Safe R	November 1, 2007

=== Results ===
Candidate	Party	Popular vote		Electoral vote	
Candidate	Party	Votes	%	Votes	%
Haley Barbour (incumbent)	Republican Party	430,807	57.90	78	63.93
John Arthur Eaves Jr.	Democratic Party	313,232	42.10	44	36.07
Total		744,039	100.00	122	100.00
Source: Mississippi Secretary of State

==== By county ====
County	Haley Barbour Republican		John Arthur Eaves Jr. Democratic		Margin		Total
County	#	%	#	%	#	%	Total
Adams	4,487	54.82%	3,698	45.18%	789	9.64%	8,185
Alcorn	5,363	59.21%	3,695	40.79%	1,668	18.41%	9,058
Amite	2,589	52.54%	2,339	47.46%	250	5.07%	4,928
Attala	3,148	57.62%	2,315	42.38%	833	15.25%	5,463
Benton	1,103	48.10%	1,190	51.90%	-87	-3.79%	2,293
Bolivar	3,620	41.95%	5,010	58.05%	-1,390	-16.11%	8,630
Calhoun	2,732	52.65%	2,457	47.35%	275	5.30%	5,189
Carroll	2,550	63.13%	1,489	36.87%	1,061	26.27%	4,039
Chickasaw	2,340	43.13%	3,085	56.87%	-745	-13.73%	5,425
Choctaw	1,788	59.70%	1,207	40.30%	581	19.40%	2,995
Claiborne	823	24.36%	2,556	75.64%	-1,733	-51.29%	3,379
Clarke	3,149	55.67%	2,508	44.33%	641	11.33%	5,657
Clay	3,427	45.62%	4,085	54.38%	-658	-8.76%	7,512
Coahoma	2,359	48.89%	2,466	51.11%	-107	-2.22%	4,825
Copiah	3,862	49.65%	3,917	50.35%	-55	-0.71%	7,779
Covington	3,651	51.79%	3,398	48.21%	253	3.59%	7,049
DeSoto	14,206	76.61%	4,337	23.39%	9,869	53.22%	18,543
Forrest	9,839	61.22%	6,232	38.78%	3,607	22.44%	16,071
Franklin	1,472	55.99%	1,157	44.01%	315	11.98%	2,629
George	3,093	58.49%	2,195	41.51%	898	16.98%	5,288
Greene	1,907	54.10%	1,618	45.90%	289	8.20%	3,525
Grenada	3,750	56.62%	2,873	43.38%	877	13.24%	6,623
Hancock	7,261	71.97%	2,828	28.03%	4,433	43.94%	10,089
Harrison	23,978	71.40%	9,604	28.60%	14,374	42.80%	33,582
Hinds	26,746	43.98%	34,074	56.02%	-7,328	-12.05%	60,820
Holmes	1,574	28.92%	3,868	71.08%	-2,294	-42.15%	5,442
Humphreys	1,436	37.09%	2,436	62.91%	-1,000	-25.83%	3,872
Issaquena	364	45.73%	432	54.27%	-68	-8.54%	796
Itawamba	3,826	52.66%	3,439	47.34%	387	5.33%	7,265
Jackson	22,188	69.55%	9,715	30.45%	12,473	39.10%	31,903
Jasper	2,164	40.16%	3,225	59.84%	-1,061	-19.69%	5,389
Jefferson	597	20.11%	2,372	79.89%	-1,775	-59.78%	2,969
Jefferson Davis	2,425	40.92%	3,501	59.08%	-1,076	-18.16%	5,926
Jones	11,928	60.44%	7,807	39.56%	4,121	20.88%	19,735
Kemper	1,578	41.82%	2,195	58.18%	-617	-16.35%	3,773
Lafayette	5,621	67.60%	2,694	32.40%	2,927	35.20%	8,315
Lamar	9,915	74.47%	3,399	25.53%	6,516	48.94%	13,314
Lauderdale	11,858	65.19%	6,331	34.81%	5,527	30.39%	18,189
Lawrence	2,276	55.16%	1,850	44.84%	426	10.32%	4,126
Leake	3,216	55.22%	2,608	44.78%	608	10.44%	5,824
Lee	12,191	59.24%	8,389	40.76%	3,802	18.47%	20,580
Leflore	3,458	45.36%	4,165	54.64%	-707	-9.27%	7,623
Lincoln	5,673	59.52%	3,858	40.48%	1,815	19.04%	9,531
Lowndes	9,900	62.65%	5,901	37.35%	3,999	25.31%	15,801
Madison	18,207	68.81%	8,254	31.19%	9,953	37.61%	26,461
Marion	5,446	59.42%	3,720	40.58%	1,726	18.83%	9,166
Marshall	3,570	49.88%	3,587	50.12%	-17	-0.24%	7,157
Monroe	5,884	53.47%	5,121	46.53%	763	6.93%	11,005
Montgomery	2,289	52.02%	2,111	47.98%	178	4.05%	4,400
Neshoba	4,825	63.95%	2,720	36.05%	2,105	27.90%	7,545
Newton	3,924	63.59%	2,247	36.41%	1,677	27.18%	6,171
Noxubee	1,180	34.21%	2,269	65.79%	-1,089	-31.57%	3,449
Oktibbeha	6,223	58.73%	4,373	41.27%	1,850	17.46%	10,596
Panola	4,588	56.66%	3,509	43.34%	1,079	13.33%	8,097
Pearl River	9,011	68.89%	4,070	31.11%	4,941	37.77%	13,081
Perry	1,881	53.05%	1,665	46.95%	216	6.09%	3,546
Pike	5,594	50.98%	5,380	49.02%	214	1.95%	10,974
Pontotoc	4,676	54.90%	3,841	45.10%	835	9.80%	8,517
Prentiss	3,379	47.99%	3,662	52.01%	-283	-4.02%	7,041
Quitman	1,021	43.41%	1,331	56.59%	-310	-13.18%	2,352
Rankin	27,928	78.59%	7,609	21.41%	20,319	57.18%	35,537
Scott	4,019	56.84%	3,052	43.16%	967	13.68%	7,071
Sharkey	828	39.77%	1,254	60.23%	-426	-20.46%	2,082
Simpson	5,158	59.79%	3,469	40.21%	1,689	19.58%	8,627
Smith	3,640	61.79%	2,251	38.21%	1,389	23.58%	5,891
Stone	2,765	58.67%	1,948	41.33%	817	17.34%	4,713
Sunflower	2,448	38.62%	3,890	61.38%	-1,442	-22.75%	6,338
Tallahatchie	1,976	41.67%	2,766	58.33%	-790	-16.66%	4,742
Tate	4,508	67.54%	2,167	32.46%	2,341	35.07%	6,675
Tippah	4,034	58.04%	2,916	41.96%	1,118	16.09%	6,950
Tishomingo	3,484	53.45%	3,034	46.55%	450	6.90%	6,518
Tunica	1,237	48.55%	1,311	51.45%	-74	-2.90%	2,548
Union	3,990	55.99%	3,136	44.01%	854	11.98%	7,126
Walthall	2,378	55.06%	1,941	44.94%	437	10.12%	4,319
Warren	7,894	59.81%	5,305	40.19%	2,589	19.62%	13,199
Washington	4,020	43.18%	5,289	56.82%	-1,269	-13.63%	9,309
Wayne	3,440	47.82%	3,754	52.18%	-314	-4.36%	7,194
Webster	2,601	64.73%	1,417	35.27%	1,184	29.47%	4,018
Wilkinson	1,169	42.43%	1,586	57.57%	-417	-15.14%	2,755
Winston	3,678	49.32%	3,779	50.68%	-101	-1.35%	7,457
Yalobusha	2,024	55.53%	1,621	44.47%	403	11.06%	3,645
Yazoo	4,459	57.04%	3,359	42.96%	1,100	14.07%	7,818
Totals	430,807	57.90%	313,232	42.10%	117,575	15.80%	744,039

==== Counties that flipped from Democratic to Republican ====
- Adams (largest city: Natchez)
- Monroe (largest city: Amory)
- Panola (largest city: Batesville)
- Pike (largest city: McComb)
- Yalobusha (largest city: Water Valley)

==== Counties that flipped from Republican to Democratic ====
- Wayne (largest municipality: Waynesboro)
- Winston (largest city: Louisville)

== See also ==
- State of Mississippi
- Governors of Mississippi
