= Haley Barbour =

American attorney and politician (born 1947)

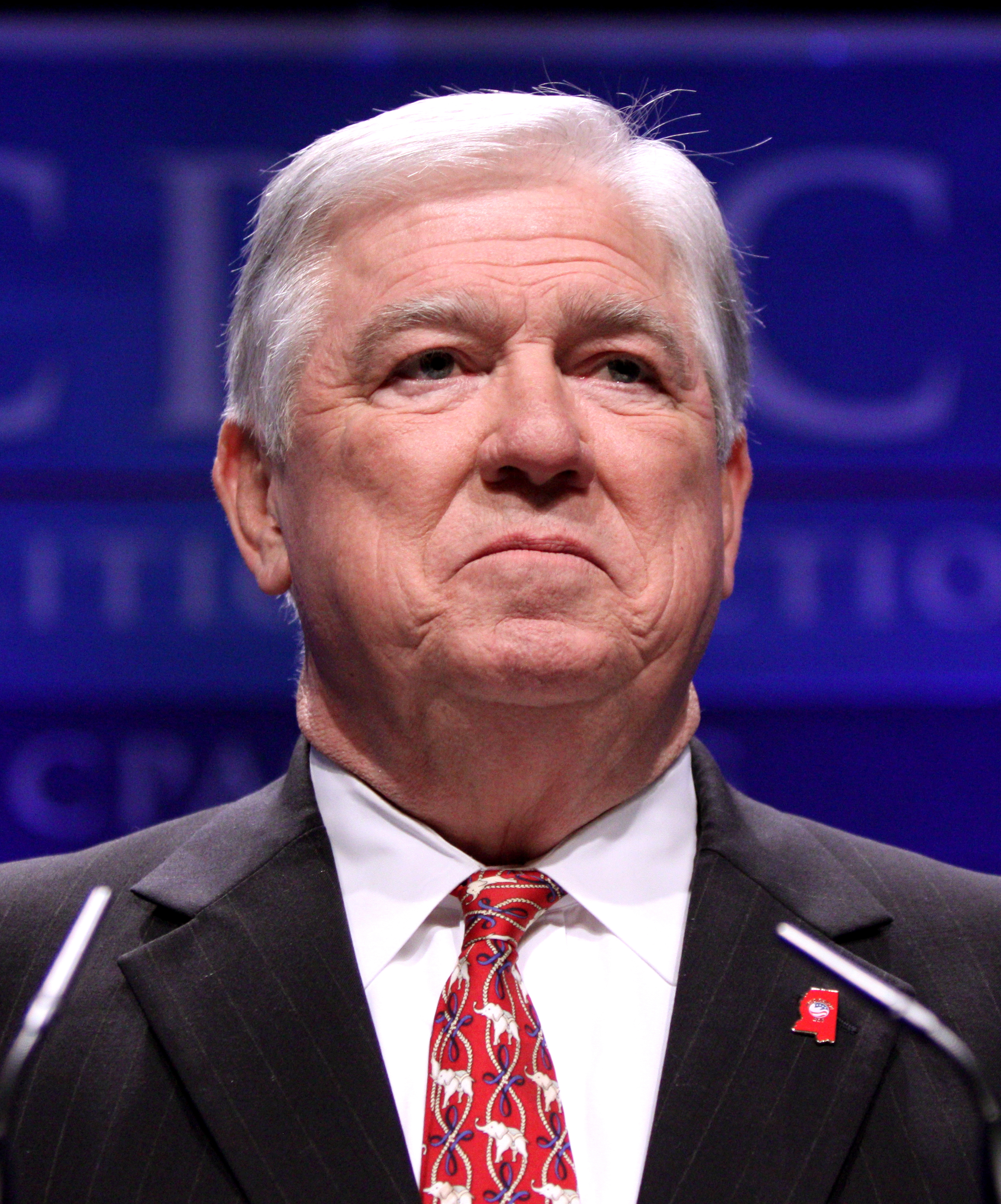
- Barbour in 2011

63rd Governor of Mississippi
- In office January 13, 2004 – January 10, 2012
- Lieutenant: Amy Tuck; Phil Bryant
- Preceded by: Ronnie Musgrove
- Succeeded by: Phil Bryant

Chair of the Republican National Committee
- In office January 29, 1993 – January 17, 1997
- Preceded by: Richard Bond
- Succeeded by: Jim Nicholson

White House Director of Political Affairs
- In office June 17, 1986 – March 16, 1987 Serving with Mitch Daniels, Frank Donatelli
- President: Ronald Reagan
- Preceded by: Bill Lacy
- Succeeded by: Frank Lavin

Personal details
- Born: Haley Reeves Barbour; October 22, 1947 (age 79) Yazoo City, Mississippi, U.S.
- Party: Republican
- Spouse: Marsha Dickson (m. 1971)
- Education: University of Mississippi (BA, JD)

Haley Reeves Barbour (born October 22, 1947) is an American attorney, politician, and lobbyist who served as the 63rd governor of Mississippi from 2004 to 2012. A member of the Republican Party, he previously served as chairman of the Republican National Committee from 1993 to 1997.

Born in Yazoo City, Mississippi, Barbour graduated from the University of Mississippi with undergraduate and law degrees, where he was a member of Sigma Alpha Epsilon fraternity. Barbour was an active Republican operative during the 1970s and 1980s, and he is often credited with building significant Republican infrastructure in Mississippi during an era when it was still dominated by Southern Democrats. He was the Republican nominee for U.S. Senate in 1982, but lost to incumbent Democrat John C. Stennis.

In 2003, Barbour became the second Republican governor of Mississippi since Reconstruction when he defeated Democratic incumbent Ronnie Musgrove. As governor he oversaw his state's responses to Hurricane Katrina and the 2010 Deepwater Horizon oil spill, the state's two most damaging environmental disasters since the 1927 Mississippi River floods. Barbour was expected to be a candidate for president in 2012, but announced he would not run in April 2011.

Since retiring as governor, Barbour has resumed lobbying as a senior partner at BGR Group, which he co-founded in 1991. He has been described as "one of Washington's all-time mega-lobbyists". His clients have often included foreign governments, oil, and tobacco companies. Barbour currently co-chairs the Immigration Task Force at the Bipartisan Policy Center.

== Early years ==
Barbour was born in Yazoo City, Mississippi, where he was raised as the youngest of three sons of Grace LeFlore (née Johnson) and Jeptha Fowlkes Barbour, Jr. Haley's father, a lawyer, died when Barbour was two years old. Barbour's father was a Circuit Judge who had an inmate, Leon Turner, assist him after Judge Barbour became ill. As governor, Haley later gave Turner, who had helped raise him, a posthumous pardon in the closing days of his administration.

His brother Jeptha Fowlkes Barbour III was elected mayor of Yazoo City in 1968 as an independent and served until 1972.

He enrolled at the University of Mississippi School of Law, receiving a Juris Doctor (J.D.) degree in 1972.

Subsequently, Barbour joined his father's old law firm in Yazoo City. He was also a law partner of his cousin, William H. Barbour Jr., who later became a federal district judge.

== Early political career ==
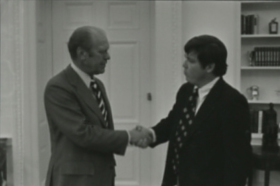
Barbour with President Gerald Ford in 1976

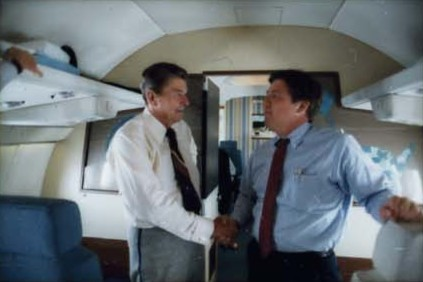
Barbour with President Ronald Reagan in 1985

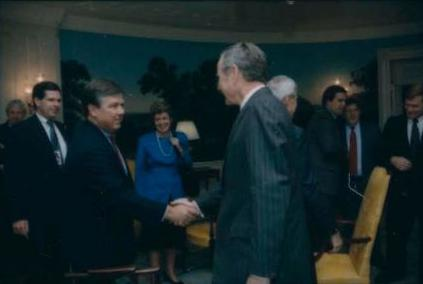
Barbour with President George H. W. Bush in 1990

Barbour soon became prominent within the Republican party running Gerald Ford's 1976 presidential campaign in the Southeast. He also worked on the campaign of former Texas governor John Connally, who had become a Republican, for president in 1980. In 1982 Barbour was the Republican nominee for the U.S. Senate election in Mississippi, but was defeated 64% to 36% by longtime incumbent John C. Stennis, a conservative Democrat, despite an endorsement by President Ronald Reagan. During the campaign, The New York Times reported that a Barbour aide complained about "coons" at a campaign event. Barbour, embarrassed that the comment was overheard by a reporter, told the aide that he would be "reincarnated as a watermelon and placed at the mercy of blacks" if he continued making racist comments. Barbour was the last Republican to have lost a Senate election in Mississippi until Cindy Hyde-Smith lost to Scott Colom in 2026.

Barbour later served as a political aide in the Reagan Administration and worked on the 1988 presidential campaign of George H. W. Bush.

Before being elected governor of Mississippi, Barbour "had a long career on the national stage" and was "well-known as a Republican operative since the Reagan years".

== Lobbying career ==
Barbour has been described as "one of Washington's all-time mega-lobbyists". He "was a wealthy K Street lobbyist for giant corporations such as RJ Reynolds, Philip Morris, Amgen, Microsoft, United Health, Southern Company, and many others." In 1991, Barbour helped found the lobbying group now known as BGR Group, a Washington, D.C.–based lobbying firm, with Ed Rogers, a lawyer who formerly worked in the George H. W. Bush administration. In 1994, Lanny Griffith (also a former Bush administration appointee) joined the firm.

In 1998, Fortune magazine named Barbour Griffith & Rogers as the second-most-powerful lobbying firm in America. In 2001, after the inauguration of George W. Bush, Fortune called it the most powerful. The firm "is employed by several foreign countries, as well as oil and cigarette companies". Its role in advocating on behalf of the tobacco industry has been particularly prominent. BGR also "lobbied on behalf of the Embassy of Mexico in 2001 to promote a bill related to Section 245(i) of the Immigration and Nationality Act. This provision would have provided a path to citizenship for illegal immigrants in the United States, through family connections or job skills, without a requirement that they return to their home country for the requisite 3-10 years. This is what's often referred to as 'amnesty.'" "As part of that work, Barbour's firm arranged meetings and briefings with 'Senators, members of Congress and their staffs, as well as Executive Branch Officials in the White House, National Security Council, State Department, and Immigration & Naturalization Service'. Barbour's firm charged Mexico $35,000 a month, plus expenses."

As of 2010, the firm remained one of DC's top 25, but had seen revenues drop both in 2009 and in 2010. As of 2011, Barbour continued to "collect payments from BGR through a blind trust, which was recently valued at $3.3 million".

In early 2014, Barbour and his nephew, Henry Barbour, formed a Super PAC named Mississippi Conservatives, which supported the successful reelection campaign of Senator Thad Cochran.

== RNC chairman ==
In 1993, Barbour became chairman of the Republican National Committee (RNC). In 1994, during his tenure as RNC chair, Republicans captured both houses of the United States Congress, taking the House of Representatives for the first time in 40 years. In 1997, Barbour retired from his position as chairman of the RNC.

== Governor of Mississippi ==
=== 2003 campaign ===
After two decades in Washington, D.C., Barbour announced his intention to run for governor of Mississippi in 2003. On August 5, 2003, Barbour won the Republican gubernatorial primary over Canton trial attorney Mitch Tyner. Barbour's campaign manager was his nephew Henry Barbour.

During the campaign, a controversy arose when Barbour chose to speak at the Blackhawk Rally, a fundraiser for the Blackhawk "council school" in Blackhawk, Mississippi. Such "council schools", also referred to in Mississippi lexicon as "academies", were established by the White Citizens' Council movement in reaction to the demands for racial integration by the Civil Rights Movement. The Blackhawk rally was hosted by the Council of Conservative Citizens (CCC). A photograph of Barbour with CCC members appeared on the CCC webpage, and some commentators and pundits demanded that Barbour ask for his picture to be removed from the site, but Barbour refused. Barbour stated that "Once you start down the slippery slope of saying, 'That person can't be for me,' then where do you stop? ... I don't care who has my picture. My picture's in the public domain." Barbour's Democratic opponent, then-governor Ronnie Musgrove, declined to be critical, stating that he had also attended Blackhawk rallies in the past, and would have done so that year except for a scheduling conflict. Historically, both Democrats and Republicans have participated in Blackhawk rallies.

Barbour defeated incumbent Musgrove in the general election on November 4, 2003, with 53 percent of the vote to Musgrove's 46 percent. Barbour became just the second Republican governor elected in Mississippi since Reconstruction, the first being Kirk Fordice.

Barbour took office in January 2004.

=== Fiscal matters ===
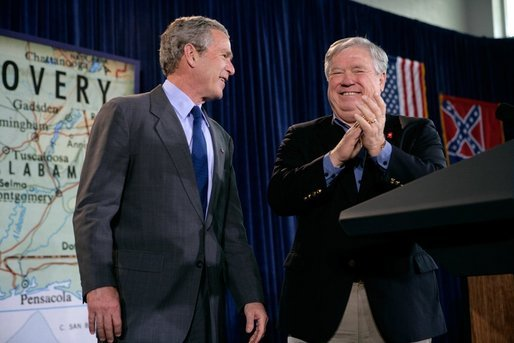
Barbour with President George W. Bush in 2006

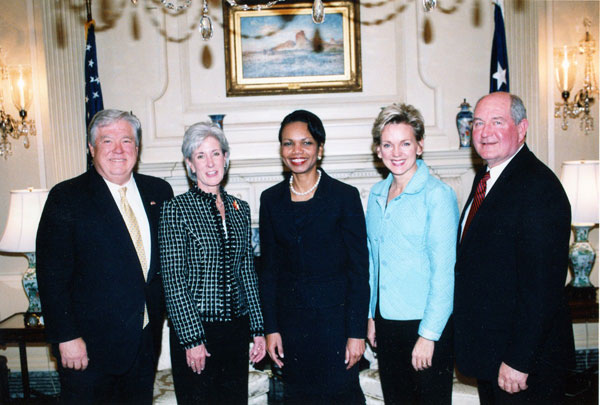
From left, Barbour with Kathleen Sebelius, Condoleezza Rice, Jennifer Granholm and Sonny Perdue

Barbour called several special legislative sessions to force a financial issue.

Writing for Reason magazine in February 2011, Damon Root expressed the opinion that Barbour supports farm subsidies, corporate welfare, and eminent domain. When he took office, the state of Mississippi had run a $709 million budget deficit for the 2004 fiscal year. With bipartisan support, and without raising taxes, Barbour implemented a plan called Operation: Streamline to cut the budget deficit in half. He accomplished this largely by reducing spending on social services, most notably Medicaid; the 2005 budget drastically reduced coverage for 65,000 individuals classified as Poverty-Level Aged and Disabled (PLAD), most of whom qualified for the federal Medicare program, and also significantly limited prescription drug coverage. However, the same budget increased the percentage of Medicaid prescriptions that are for generic drugs. In 2005, the state was budgeted to spend a total of $130 million less on Medicaid than in the previous year. This trend continued in the state budget for the 2006 fiscal year. After a long special session, the legislature approved a budget that featured more social service cuts but also increased educational spending. With tax revenues higher than expected during the 2006 fiscal year, due in large part to increased sales tax revenues in the wake of Hurricane Katrina, the state achieved its first balanced budget in years. In the 2008 fiscal year budget, for the first time since its enactment in 1997, the state fully funded the Mississippi Adequate Education Program.

Building on a 2002 tort reform bill passed by his predecessor, Barbour also introduced a new tort reform measure that has been described as one of the strictest in the nation. Barbour rarely made a speech during his gubernatorial campaign without mentioning this subject and was able to convert political support into law, overcoming the resistance of House Democratic leaders, who argued that further legislation would disenfranchise people with legitimate complaints against corporations. Barbour then embarked on a "tort tour" to encourage other states to follow Mississippi's lead. "We've gone from being labeled as a judicial hellhole and the center of jackpot justice to a state that now has model legislation," commented Charlie Ross, the chair of the Mississippi Senate's Judiciary Committee.

The effectiveness of Barbour's tort reform efforts has been questioned. According to conservative journalist Timothy Carney, he "touts job growth down in Mississippi under his governing, and some of that is due to tort reform, but some of it is due to rank favoritism and special-interest deals more akin to Obama than Reagan — for instance, subsidies for a biofuels plant."

Through his entire terms, Barbour's Commissioner of Corrections was Chris Epps, who had been appointed on August 30, 2002 by Democratic Governor Ronnie Musgrove. Republican governors Barbour and Phil Bryant reappointed Epps on January 13, 2004 and January 11, 2012, respectively. On November 6, 2014, it was revealed by federal prosecutors in the FBI's Operation Mississippi Hustle sting that Epps and a confederate, former Republican state House member Cecil McCrory, had taken bribes from many for-profit prison operators, consultants, vendors and subcontractors for other prisoner services. The amounts Epps personally received were estimated to be at least $1.47 million in bribes for steering what Assistant US Attorney LaMarca estimated was $800 million in contracts between 2006 and 2014. Epps cooperated with the prosecution and wore a wire for a substantial amount of time before their indictments were made public. Before federal Judge Henry Travillion Wingate pronounced his sentence in July 2017, Epps asked forgiveness of the many he had harmed. He said, "It comes back to greed. I made some stupid mistakes I will regret for the rest of my life." Judge Wingate characterized Epps' conduct as, "staggering." He continued, "Mississippi is still in shock. It was an act of betrayal. He has bruised the image of Mississippi and given joy to many of the inmates he’s overseen who can now say the head of the state prison system was just as corrupt as any of them." He sentenced Epps to over 19 years in federal prison. On February 8, 2017, Mississippi Attorney General Jim Hood, a Democrat, announced he had filed civil cases against 15 corporations and individuals who had engaged in contracts with the MDOC and Epps, seeking damages and punitive damages. He stated,

"The state of Mississippi has been defrauded through a pattern of bribery, kickbacks, misrepresentations, fraud, concealment, money laundering and other wrongful conduct." He continued, "These individuals and corporations that benefited by stealing from taxpayers must not only pay the state's losses, but state law requires that they must also forfeit and return the entire amount of the contracts paid by the state. We are also seeking punitive damages to punish these conspirators and to deter those who might consider giving or receiving kickbacks in the future."

Defendants in the bribery cases included Management & Training Corporation; The GEO Group, Inc.; Cornell Companies, Inc.; Wexford Health Sources, Inc.; Global Tel*Link Corporation; Health Assurance, LLC; Keefe Commissary Network, LLC of St. Louis; Sentinel Offender Services, L.L.C.; AJA Management & Technical Services, Inc., and the Branan Medical Corporation; On May 18, 2017, Hood announced that the state had quickly settled the first suit for two million dollars. The defendant was Alere Incorporated, which had purchased the Branan Medical Corporation. Ten lawsuits in bribery schemes remained pending. Those have accused at least 10 individuals and 11 out-of-state corporations of using so-called "consultants" to gain more than $800 million in Mississippi prison contracts. On January 24, 2019, Hood announced his actions had recovered $27 million from those vendors against which he had filed suits. Management and Training Corporation paid $5.2 million. GEO Group paid $4.6 million, with the named defendant being Cornell Companies, which had been merged with GEO in 2010. Wexford Health Sources paid $4 million. Keefe Commissary Network paid $3.1 million. $3.1 million was paid by C.N.W. Construction Company. $750,000 was paid by CGL Facility Management, which provides maintenance services. $32,188 was received from AdminPros LLC, a Medicaid billing service. Insurance agent Guy E. "Butch" Evans paid $100,000.

=== Hurricane Katrina response ===
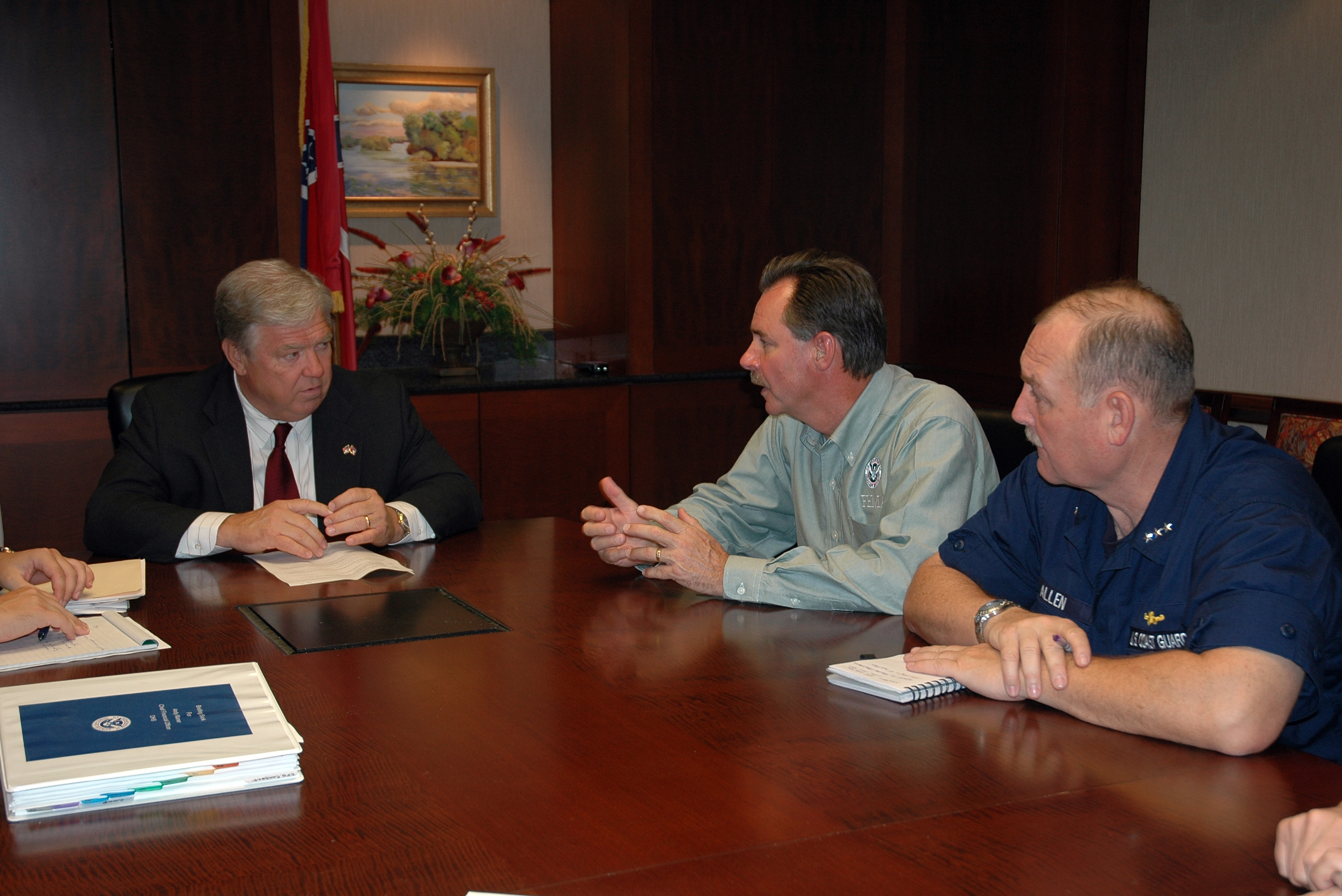
Barbour (left) meeting with FEMA officials to discuss Hurricane Katrina recovery efforts, September 2005

The evacuation order for Hurricane Katrina was issued by local officials more than 24 hours before it hit, and Mississippi activated 750 National Guard troops as of August 29, the day of the hurricane.

On August 29, 2005, Hurricane Katrina struck Mississippi's coast, killing 231 people, devastating the state's $2.7 billion-a-year casino industry and leaving tens of thousands homeless. (see Effect of Hurricane Katrina on Mississippi). Barbour's response was characterized by a concerted effort at evacuation, tough-minded talk on looters and an unwillingness to blame the federal government. His response was likened, favorably, to that of Rudy Giuliani in the wake of the September 11 attacks.

Barbour credited the government workers who helped southern Mississippi to cope with the hurricane. Barbour was praised by the coast's citizens as a strong leader who can communicate calmly to the public, and provide "a central decision-making point for when things get balled up or go sideways, which they do", as Barbour says.

While the reconstruction process does not dictate how localities should rebuild, Barbour has touted New Urbanist principles in constructing more compact communities. "They have the chance to build some things very differently," he says. "The goal is to build the coast back like it can be, rather than simply like it was."

Barbour has been accused by Bloomberg News of personally profiting from Hurricane Katrina recovery. Barbour is an owner of the parent company of lobbying firm Barbour Griffith & Rogers Inc., and he receives a pension and profit-sharing plan benefits from it. The lobbying firm has lobbied the state to give recovery contracts to its clients. Some of the proceeds of the firm's lobbying activities are deposited into Barbour's investment account. According to Barbour's attorney, a blind trust executed in 2004 prevents Barbour knowing the composition of his investments in order to eliminate any conflicts of interest.

=== Tobacco matters ===
Barbour has also received criticism from some Mississippi Democrats for his refusal to approve a bill to increase the cigarette tax and decrease the grocery tax passed by the Mississippi House of Representatives during his first term as governor. Mississippi currently has the third-lowest cigarette tax and the highest grocery tax—while being the poorest state in the country. He stated that the lack of revenue generated after the tax swap would quite possibly result in bankrupting the state government, which was already fragile due to the devastation caused by Hurricane Katrina. The House of Representatives could produce no figures to dispute this assertion. Also, in his successful 2004 campaign, Barbour ran on the platform that he would veto any tax increase.

In May 2009, Barbour followed the State Tax Commission's recommendation and signed into law the state's first increase since 1985, from 18 cents to 68 cents per pack. The tax is estimated to generate more than $113 million for the year that begins July 1, 2009.

=== 2007 re-election ===
Barbour announced on February 8, 2007, that he would seek a second term as Governor of Mississippi. Barbour announced the beginning of his re-election campaign at a series of meetings across the state on February 12, 2007. During his campaign, Barbour signed the Americans for Tax Reform "Taxpayer Protection Pledge" and vowed not to institute any new taxes or raise any existing ones.

Barbour defeated Frederick Jones in the Republican primary on August 7 and Democrat John Arthur Eaves Jr. in the November general election.

=== Race and integration ===
Barbour has faced considerable "in-state criticism for his approach to racial issues". Mississippi state Representative Willie Perkins has "compared Barbour to the southern Democrats who preceded him", saying: "As far as I'm concerned, he has never done anything as a governor or a citizen to distinguish himself from the old Democrats who fought tooth and nail to preserve segregation."

In 2006, he declined to posthumously pardon Clyde Kennard, an African-American civil rights pioneer, after evidence was presented that Kennard had been falsely convicted of burglary in Hattiesburg, Mississippi in 1960. Instead, Barbour designated a Clyde Kennard Day, calling for remembrance of Kennard's "determination, the injustices he suffered, and his significant role in the history of the civil rights movement in Mississippi". Barbour subsequently joined in a petition for a court rehearing of the case that resulted in the original conviction being thrown out.

Barbour proved instrumental in winning state legislative support for the Mississippi Civil Rights Museum. Legislation to fund a state museum had been introduced every year since 2000, but died for various reasons. In November 2006, Barbour proposed creating a state commission to develop plans for the Mississippi Civil Rights Museum. In his "State of the State" address on January 16, 2007, Barbour said the museum was "overdue, and it needs doing", The proposal won legislative approval, and a site for the museum was selected in March 2008. The project then stalled for three years, however, with museum backers listing lack of direction from the governor's office and Barbour's refusal to spend $500,000 in museum planning funds as part of the reason why. Barbour also declined to name a museum commission to oversee the final push for funding and construction. Following controversy over Barbour's statements on White Citizens' Councils, the governor again declared his complete support for construction of the museum, in what many political observers felt was an attempt to dampen criticism over his remarks as well as to disassociate himself from Mississippi's racially intolerant past. The museum secured $20 million in funding from the Mississippi Legislature in April 2011 after Barbour personally testified in favor of its funding.

During an April 11, 2010, appearance on CNN, host Candy Crowley asked if it had been insensitive for Virginia Governor Bob McDonnell to omit mentioning slavery in a proposed recognition of Confederate History Month. Barbour replied, "To me, it's a sort of feeling that it's a nit, that it is not significant, that it's not a—it's trying to make a big deal out of something doesn't amount to diddly." Barbour continued, "I don't know what you would say about slavery ... but anybody that thinks that you have to explain to people that slavery is a bad thing, I think that goes without saying."

In December 2010, Barbour was interviewed by The Weekly Standard magazine. Asked about coming of age in Yazoo City during the civil rights era, he told the interviewer regarding growing up there, "I just don't remember it as being that bad." Barbour then credited the White Citizens' Council for keeping the Ku Klux Klan (KKK) out of Yazoo City and ensuring the peaceful integration of its schools. Barbour dismissed comparisons between White Citizens' Councils and the KKK, and referred to the Councils as "an organization of town leaders". Barbour continued in his defense of the Councils, saying, "In Yazoo City they passed a resolution that said anybody who started a chapter of the Klan would get their ass run out of town. If you had a job, you'd lose it. If you had a store, they'd see nobody shopped there. We didn't have a problem with the Klan in Yazoo City." Barbour's statement did not address the role of the white supremacist Council in publicly naming and blacklisting individuals who petitioned for educational integration and how it used political pressure and violence to force African-American residents to move. This led to a considerable outcry in which critics such as Rachel Maddow accused Barbour of whitewashing history. In response to criticism, Barbour issued a statement declaring Citizens' Councils to be "indefensible."

In what was speculated to be an attempt at damage control just days after the interview, Barbour suspended the prison sentences of Jamie and Gladys Scott, two African American women who each received two life sentences resulting from a 1993 mugging in which the two women allegedly conspired to steal what amounted to $11. Barbour has denied that there was any connection between the suspension of the Scott sisters' prison sentence and the controversy surrounding his Weekly Standard interview. Jamie Scott suffered from kidney failure while in prison, and requires a donated organ, which her sister Gladys had volunteered to provide. Barbour's decision to release the Scott sisters, however, was contingent upon her consent for the promised organ donation by Gladys Scott, which critics argued amounted to coercion and raises questions of medical ethics. The sisters were released in 2011, but by 2018 the transplant had not occurred because of other medical conditions suffered by the intended recipient.

=== Other second term activities ===
In September 2008, some Democrats accused Barbour of trying to influence the outcome of the 2008 Senate race by placing the candidates at the bottom of the ballot. Since Mississippi electoral law mandates the placing of federal elections at the top of the ballot, Barbour was ordered by a circuit court to comply with the ballot laws.

In April 2009, Barbour joined a conservative policy group to discuss Republican policies in town hall meetings. The group also included former Massachusetts Governor Mitt Romney, former Florida Governor Jeb Bush, Louisiana Governor Bobby Jindal, and Senator John McCain.

On June 24, 2009, Barbour assumed the chairmanship of the Republican Governors Association, succeeding South Carolina Governor Mark Sanford. On October 29, 2009, Barbour endorsed Texas Governor Rick Perry for the Texas Republican gubernatorial nomination.

On March 3, 2010, Barbour and his wife participated in events with First Lady Michelle Obama, promoting the Let's Move! anti-obesity campaign.

In March 2011, Barbour drew criticism for his role in allowing the release of a convicted killer eight years into a 20-year sentence. In prior years, Barbour had used his powers as governor to release five other killers.

=== 2012 pardons ===
On his last day as governor in 2012, Barbour granted pardons, clemency, or early release to 203 people convicted of crimes, including murder, rape and armed robbery. Barbour's actions included 19 people convicted of murder. Pardons by governors are not uncommon; the issue in this case is the number of pardons compared to former governors. Previous governor Ronnie Musgrove issued only one pardon, for a man convicted of marijuana possession; Governor Kirk Fordice, who preceded Musgrove, issued only two full pardons for convicted murderers.

Harry Bostick, whom Barbour pardoned, had been convicted of DUI three times, and at the time of his pardon was being held for (and subsequently pleaded guilty to) the DUI killing of Charity Smith.

On January 11, a Mississippi judge temporarily blocked the release of 21 inmates who had been given pardons or medical release. Attorney General Jim Hood argued the Mississippi Constitution says any inmate seeking a pardon must publish their intentions at least 30 days prior to the hearing in a newspaper in or near the county where the person was convicted. Hood also criticized Barbour for failing to notify or speak with the families of victims before granting the pardons. He responded to criticism of his actions, saying that 90% of those involved had already been released from prison, many years earlier; he acted in order to allow them to find employment, get professional licenses, vote and hunt. He also stated that in 90% of the cases his decision was based on recommendations of the parole board.

An article in The New York Times said that a disproportionate number of pardons were granted to applicants from wealthy families and those with personal or political connections, a situation also observed in the pardon systems of other states.

On March 8, 2012, the Mississippi Supreme Court upheld the pardons, which had been challenged based on the argument that many of them did not follow a requirement in the state constitution to publish notices in newspapers for 30 days. The Court wrote "we are compelled to hold that – in each of the cases before us – it fell to the governor alone to decide whether the Constitution's publication requirement was met." The court also said it could not overturn the pardons because of the constitution's separation of powers of the different branches of government.

=== Speculated 2012 presidential campaign ===
After he visited Iowa in 2009, there was speculation that Barbour might run for the Republican nomination for U.S. president in 2012. An advisor of Barbour stated, "When he surveys what most Republicans consider to be a weak field, he sees no reason he couldn't easily beat them. He's a better strategist and fundraiser than any other candidate currently considering running—and just as good on television and in debates." While considering a potential run, Barbour stated forthrightly in February 2011, "I'm a lobbyist", and said that his K Street past prepared him for the job.

Many commentators were skeptical of Barbour's chances in 2012. David Broder of The Washington Post wrote that "several others would have to stumble before he could get a serious consideration." Statistician Nate Silver argued that "Barbour may have difficulty appealing to voters outside the South, especially after his recent comments about the civil rights era." Salon.com noted that "Barbour has some serious baggage ... he's lobbied on behalf of the Mexican government for amnesty. There's also the issue of his freighted racial history, and whatever pragmatic concerns it raises for November-minded Republicans." Timothy Carney, reflecting on Barbour's history as a lobbyist, concluded: "If the Tea Party still has some wind, it's hard to see how Barbour gets anywhere near the GOP nomination." On April 25, 2011, Barbour announced that he would not run for president in 2012.

=== Public image ===
Barbour maintained a positive approval rating in his state during periods when he was governor. A July 2010 Rasmussen Reports poll found that Barbour had a 70% approval rating in Mississippi.

=== Awards and honors ===
In 2009, Barbour was awarded the Honorary Patronage of the University Philosophical Society, Trinity College, Dublin. The Mississippi Emergency Management Agency headquarters building in Pearl, MS was named in his honor on January 5, 2012.

On October 18, 2012, The Center for Manufacturing Excellence at the University of Mississippi in Oxford, Mississippi was named in his honor

== Post-gubernatorial career ==
After leaving office as governor, Barbour joined Butler Snow, a Jackson, Mississippi law firm (together with his former Chief of Staff Paul Hurst); re-joined lobbying firm BGR Group; and became a client of speakers' bureau Leading Authorities. At a Christian Science Monitor breakfast in June 2012, Barbour suggested that the Republican Party should take a more moderate approach to certain elements of its platform. He suggested barring corporations and unions from making direct campaign contributions, expressed satisfaction with Mitt Romney's moderate brand of Republicanism, and suggested that the party should soften its stance on illegal immigration and reach out to Latino voters: "We need a secure border for lots of reasons, and then we need to recognize that we're not going to deport 12 million people and we shouldn't."

During a private Crossroads fundraiser in Tampa in 2012, Barbour said, of the planned keynote address by New Jersey Governor Chris Christie at the 2012 Republican National Convention, "I would love for Christie to put a hot poker to Obama's butt..." He was criticized by some online commentators for the alleged racism of these remarks. He later apologized for his statement.

Barbour was stopped with a loaded handgun in a briefcase by TSA security at the Medgar Evers airport in Jackson on January 2, 2018 as he was boarding a flight for Washington, D.C.; he was briefly detained by airport police and said he would pay the associated fine. The governor said he forgot he had the gun there after an employee had removed it from his car days before.

Party political offices
Vacant Title last held by L. R. Collins; 1947	Republican nominee for U.S. Senator from Mississippi (Class 1); 1982	Succeeded by Trent Lott
Preceded by Richard Bond	Chair of the Republican National Committee; 1993–1997	Succeeded by Jim Nicholson
Preceded by Mike Parker	Republican nominee for Governor of Mississippi; 2003, 2007	Succeeded by Phil Bryant
Preceded by Mark Sanford	Chair of the Republican Governors Association; 2009–2010	Succeeded by Rick Perry
Political offices
Preceded by Bill Lacy	White House Director of Political Affairs; 1986–1987; Served alongside: Mitch Daniels, Frank Donatelli (Political and Intergovernmental Affairs)	Succeeded by Frank Lavin
Preceded by Ronnie Musgrove	Governor of Mississippi; 2004–2012	Succeeded by Phil Bryant
U.S. order of precedence (ceremonial)
Preceded by Ronnie Musgrove as Former Governor	Order of precedence of the United States	Succeeded by Phil Bryant as Former Governor
