= 2003 Mississippi gubernatorial election =

- November 4, 2003
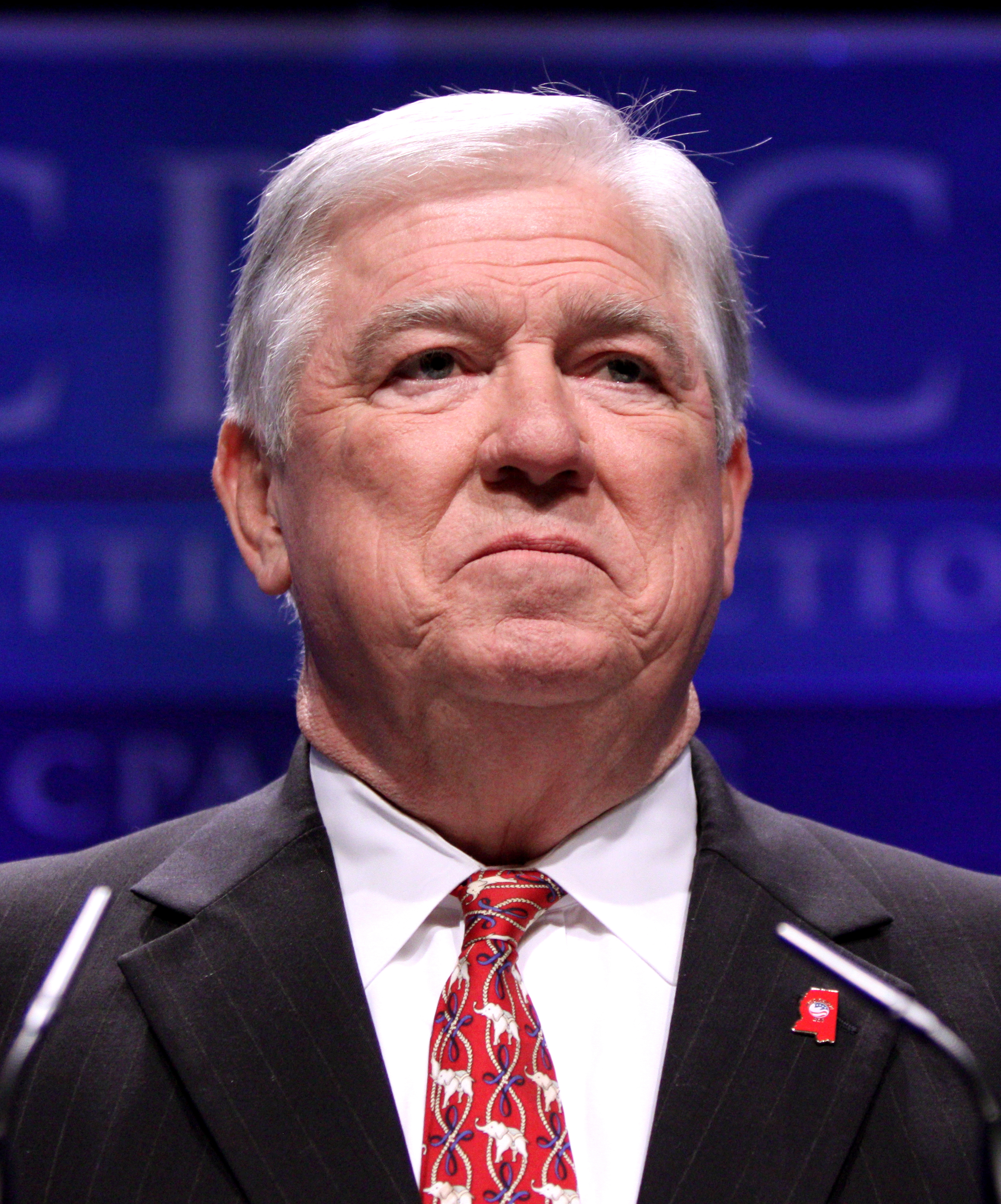

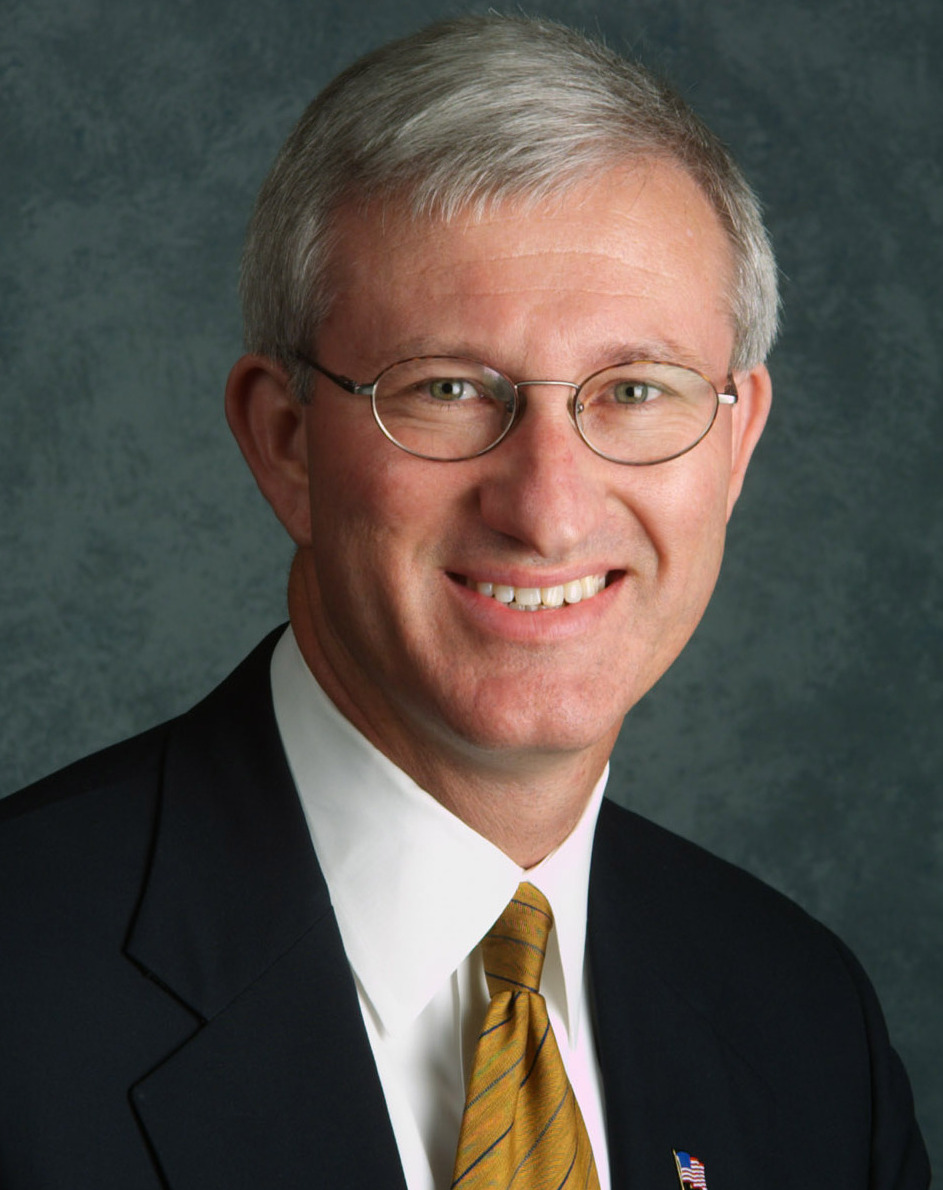
Nominee	Haley Barbour	Ronnie Musgrove
Party	Republican	Democratic
Electoral vote	76	46
Popular vote	470,404	409,787
Percentage	52.59%	45.81%
- County results Barbour: 40–50% 50–60% 60–70% 70–80% Musgrove: 40–50% 50–60% 60–70% 70–80% 80–90%
Governor before election
Ronnie Musgrove
Democratic
Elected Governor
Haley Barbour
Republican

The 2003 Mississippi gubernatorial election took place on November 4, 2003, to elect the governor of the U.S. state of Mississippi. Former Republican National Committee chairman Haley Barbour defeated incumbent Democrat Ronnie Musgrove by a margin of 6.78%.

As of 2026, the election remains the most expensive Mississippi gubernatorial election in state history, with over $18 million having been spent between Barbour and Musgrove. An additional $5 million was spent by the Republican Governors Association, mostly on television advertising. Barbour's victory in the election made him only the second Republican governor of Mississippi since Reconstruction. It was also the last time the governorships of Mississippi and neighboring Louisiana simultaneously flipped to the opposite political party as of 2026.

== Democratic primary ==
=== Candidates ===
- Gilbert Fountain, perennial candidate
- Elder McClendon
- Ronnie Musgrove, incumbent Governor of Mississippi
- Katie Perrone
- Catherine Starr, activist

=== Campaign ===
Musgrove was elected governor in 1999 after a very close election against Michael Parker. As neither candidate had obtained a majority in the election, Musgrove was chosen as governor by the Democratic controlled Mississippi House of Representatives.

As governor, Musgrove had difficulties with the state's legislators. He vetoed the whole budget one year but was overridden by the legislature. However, Musgrove campaigned on having secured the largest pay raise for teachers in the state's history.

=== Results ===
Democratic primary results
Party	Candidate	Votes	%
Democratic	Ronnie Musgrove (incumbent)	392,264	75.82
Democratic	Gilbert Fountain	39,685	7.67
Democratic	Elder McClendon	30,421	5.88
Democratic	Katie Perrone	28,154	5.44
Democratic	Catherine M. Starr	26,821	5.18
Total votes		517,345	100.00

== Republican primary ==
=== Candidates ===
- Haley Barbour, Chairman of Republican National Committee, political consultant, Republican nominee for the United States Senate in 1982
- Mitch Tyner, attorney

=== Campaign ===
Barbour, a former advisor in the White House during the presidency of Ronald Reagan and Chairman of the Republican National Committee from 1993 to 1996, announced that he would run for governor on February 17, 2003. He had previously failed to be elected to the U.S. Senate for Mississippi in 1982, and in 2002 he travelled the state for several months to gauge support for his gubernatorial bid.

=== Endorsements ===
Haley Barbour
Steve Ballmer, President (1998-2000) and CEO (2000-2014) of Microsoft

=== Results ===
Republican primary results
Party	Candidate	Votes	%
Republican	Haley Barbour	158,284	83.21
Republican	Mitch Tyner	31,768	16.70
Republican	Write-ins	171	0.09
Total votes		190,223	100.00

== General election ==
=== Campaign ===
Musgrove campaigned as an independent and conservative candidate, downplaying his membership in the Democratic Party and avoiding inviting any national figures to support him. He criticized Barbour for being a lobbyist for the tobacco and pharmaceutical industries. A key message of Musgrove's campaign was that Barbour's support for free trade would cost jobs in Mississippi.

Barbour attacked Musgrove for his flawed leadership of the state, blaming him for the state of the economy of Mississippi. He was helped by the President, George W. Bush, who made three trips to the state to support Barbour. Several other leading Republican figures came to Mississippi to support Barbour including Dick Cheney, Jeb Bush and Rudy Giuliani.

A poll in October 2003 showed Barbour having a narrow lead, with 50% saying they would vote for him as against 45% for Musgrove. However another poll at the beginning of November showed Musgrove with 42% against 41% for Barbour and both sides regarded turnout as key to the election.

Exit polls showed that black voters made up a third of the vote and 94% of them backed Musgrove. However among white voters 77% backed Barbour and a quarter of voters who supported Musgrove in his first election in 1999 now backed Barbour.

=== Predictions ===
Source	Ranking	As of
Sabato	Tossup	September 2, 2003

=== Results ===
Candidate	Party	Popular vote		Electoral vote	
Candidate	Party	Votes	%	Votes	%
Haley Barbour	Republican Party	470,404	52.59	76	62.30
Ronnie Musgrove (incumbent)	Democratic Party	409,787	45.81	46	37.70
John Cripps	Constitution Party	6,317	0.71		
Shawn O'Hara	Reform Party	4,070	0.46		
Sherman Lee Dillon	Green Party	3,909	0.44		
Total		894,487	100.00	122	100.00
Source: Mississippi Secretary of State

==== By county ====
County	Ronnie Musgrove Democratic		Haley Barbour Republican		Various candidates Other parties		Margin		Total
County	#	%	#	%	#	%	#	%	Total
Adams	7,464	58.88%	5,123	40.41%	90	0.71%	-2,341	-18.47%	12,677
Alcorn	4,401	42.57%	5,613	54.29%	325	3.14%	1,212	11.72%	10,339
Amite	2,811	47.59%	2,974	50.35%	122	2.07%	163	2.76%	5,907
Attala	3,109	45.45%	3,636	53.15%	96	1.40%	527	7.70%	6,841
Benton	1,902	62.26%	1,091	35.71%	62	2.03%	-811	-26.55%	3,055
Bolivar	7,176	63.02%	3,995	35.08%	216	1.90%	-3,181	-27.94%	11,387
Calhoun	2,440	41.59%	3,303	56.30%	124	2.11%	863	14.71%	5,867
Carroll	1,712	36.55%	2,919	62.32%	53	1.13%	1,207	25.77%	4,684
Chickasaw	3,850	56.38%	2,873	42.07%	106	1.55%	-977	-14.31%	6,829
Choctaw	1,290	37.49%	2,117	61.52%	34	0.99%	827	24.03%	3,441
Claiborne	3,683	81.16%	804	17.72%	51	1.12%	-2,879	-63.44%	4,538
Clarke	2,938	40.72%	4,142	57.40%	136	1.88%	1,204	16.69%	7,216
Clay	4,827	58.04%	3,375	40.58%	114	1.37%	-1,452	-17.46%	8,316
Coahoma	4,090	61.89%	2,414	36.53%	104	1.57%	-1,676	-25.36%	6,608
Copiah	5,357	51.33%	4,951	47.44%	128	1.23%	-406	-3.89%	10,436
Covington	3,164	43.41%	3,931	53.94%	193	2.65%	767	10.52%	7,288
DeSoto	8,876	31.77%	18,689	66.90%	370	1.32%	9,813	35.13%	27,935
Forrest	7,562	39.86%	11,134	58.69%	274	1.44%	3,572	18.83%	18,970
Franklin	1,537	41.95%	2,024	55.24%	103	2.81%	487	13.29%	3,664
George	2,492	40.85%	3,485	57.12%	124	2.03%	993	16.28%	6,101
Greene	1,815	44.78%	2,176	53.69%	62	1.53%	361	8.91%	4,053
Grenada	3,215	44.37%	3,979	54.91%	52	0.72%	764	10.54%	7,246
Hancock	5,328	41.83%	7,085	55.63%	324	2.54%	1,757	13.79%	12,737
Harrison	19,310	44.13%	23,641	54.03%	808	1.85%	4,331	9.90%	43,759
Hinds	42,700	58.88%	29,057	40.07%	758	1.05%	-13,643	-18.81%	72,515
Holmes	5,052	74.44%	1,663	24.50%	72	1.06%	-3,389	-49.93%	6,787
Humphreys	2,901	61.97%	1,701	36.34%	79	1.69%	-1,200	-25.64%	4,681
Issaquena	603	63.34%	330	34.66%	19	2.00%	-273	-28.68%	952
Itawamba	3,301	43.81%	4,047	53.72%	186	2.47%	746	9.90%	7,534
Jackson	13,908	38.22%	21,818	59.96%	664	1.82%	7,910	21.74%	36,390
Jasper	3,697	56.58%	2,770	42.39%	67	1.03%	-927	-14.19%	6,534
Jefferson	2,914	84.39%	503	14.57%	36	1.04%	-2,411	-69.82%	3,453
Jefferson Davis	3,378	59.62%	2,226	39.29%	62	1.09%	-1,152	-20.33%	5,666
Jones	8,298	37.64%	13,341	60.52%	404	1.83%	5,043	22.88%	22,043
Kemper	2,759	58.89%	1,872	39.96%	54	1.15%	-887	-18.93%	4,685
Lafayette	4,716	42.73%	6,172	55.92%	149	1.35%	1,456	13.19%	11,037
Lamar	3,640	24.47%	10,838	72.86%	397	2.67%	7,198	48.39%	14,875
Lauderdale	7,707	33.88%	14,786	65.01%	252	1.11%	7,079	31.12%	22,745
Lawrence	2,644	48.39%	2,726	49.89%	94	1.72%	82	1.50%	5,464
Leake	3,061	46.14%	3,500	52.76%	73	1.10%	439	6.62%	6,634
Lee	9,690	41.51%	13,249	56.75%	407	1.74%	3,559	15.24%	23,346
Leflore	5,468	57.65%	3,808	40.15%	209	2.20%	-1,660	-17.50%	9,485
Lincoln	5,175	40.85%	7,274	57.42%	220	1.74%	2,099	16.57%	12,669
Lowndes	8,732	46.36%	9,938	52.76%	167	0.89%	1,206	6.40%	18,837
Madison	11,713	39.00%	18,020	59.99%	304	1.01%	6,307	21.00%	30,037
Marion	3,804	38.04%	6,066	60.66%	130	1.30%	2,262	22.62%	10,000
Marshall	5,043	61.18%	3,094	37.53%	106	1.29%	-1,949	-23.64%	8,243
Monroe	6,680	51.14%	6,181	47.32%	202	1.55%	-499	-3.82%	13,063
Montgomery	2,242	47.48%	2,430	51.46%	50	1.06%	188	3.98%	4,722
Neshoba	3,276	36.57%	5,559	62.06%	122	1.36%	2,283	25.49%	8,957
Newton	2,687	35.35%	4,819	63.39%	96	1.26%	2,132	28.05%	7,602
Noxubee	3,819	72.94%	1,368	26.13%	49	0.94%	-2,451	-46.81%	5,236
Oktibbeha	6,107	46.56%	6,828	52.06%	181	1.38%	721	5.50%	13,116
Panola	6,624	61.08%	4,140	38.17%	81	0.75%	-2,484	-22.90%	10,845
Pearl River	5,138	35.98%	8,782	61.49%	361	2.53%	3,644	25.52%	14,281
Perry	1,485	36.76%	2,503	61.96%	52	1.29%	1,018	25.20%	4,040
Pike	7,452	54.39%	6,048	44.15%	200	1.46%	-1,404	-10.25%	13,700
Pontotoc	3,217	35.87%	5,533	61.70%	218	2.43%	2,316	25.83%	8,968
Prentiss	4,347	49.74%	4,226	48.35%	167	1.91%	-121	-1.38%	8,740
Quitman	2,475	66.68%	1,175	31.65%	62	1.67%	-1,300	-35.02%	3,712
Rankin	9,151	23.70%	28,633	74.16%	826	2.14%	19,482	50.46%	38,610
Scott	3,612	43.77%	4,582	55.52%	59	0.71%	970	11.75%	8,253
Sharkey	1,561	59.79%	1,011	38.72%	39	1.49%	-550	-21.06%	2,611
Simpson	4,240	41.79%	5,655	55.74%	250	2.46%	1,415	13.95%	10,145
Smith	2,482	34.83%	4,499	63.13%	145	2.03%	2,017	28.30%	7,126
Stone	2,124	39.09%	3,056	56.25%	253	4.66%	932	17.15%	5,433
Sunflower	4,307	60.20%	2,772	38.75%	75	1.05%	-1,535	-21.46%	7,154
Tallahatchie	2,928	56.82%	2,150	41.72%	75	1.46%	-778	-15.10%	5,153
Tate	3,247	44.90%	3,898	53.90%	87	1.20%	651	9.00%	7,232
Tippah	3,271	44.75%	3,891	53.23%	148	2.02%	620	8.48%	7,310
Tishomingo	2,948	42.29%	3,777	54.18%	246	3.53%	829	11.89%	6,971
Tunica	1,882	67.87%	823	29.68%	68	2.45%	-1,059	-38.19%	2,773
Union	3,599	41.35%	4,906	56.36%	199	2.29%	1,307	15.02%	8,704
Walthall	2,478	48.70%	2,552	50.16%	58	1.14%	74	1.45%	5,088
Warren	7,171	45.08%	8,525	53.60%	210	1.32%	1,354	8.51%	15,906
Washington	8,720	61.34%	5,383	37.87%	112	0.79%	-3,337	-23.48%	14,215
Wayne	3,646	47.84%	3,867	50.74%	108	1.42%	221	2.90%	7,621
Webster	1,558	32.64%	3,136	65.70%	79	1.66%	1,578	33.06%	4,773
Wilkinson	2,775	65.66%	1,321	31.26%	130	3.08%	-1,454	-34.41%	4,226
Winston	4,325	48.78%	4,437	50.05%	104	1.17%	112	1.26%	8,866
Yalobusha	2,406	52.17%	2,154	46.70%	52	1.13%	-252	-5.46%	4,612
Yazoo	4,554	44.57%	5,511	53.94%	152	1.49%	957	9.37%	10,217
Totals	409,787	45.81%	470,404	52.59%	14,296	1.60%	60,617	6.78%	894,487

==== Counties that flipped from Democratic to Republican ====
- Alcorn (largest city: Corinth)
- Greene (largest municipality: Leakesville)
- Grenada (largest municipality: Grenada)
- Itawamba (largest municipality: Fulton)
- Lafayette (largest city: Oxford)
- Lee (largest municipality: Tupelo)
- Montgomery (largest city: Winona)
- Oktibbeha (largest city: Starkville)
- Tate (largest city: Sentobia)
- Tippah (largest municipality: Ripley)
- Tishomingo (largest city: Iuka)
- Union (largest municipality: New Albany)
- Wayne (largest municipality: Waynesboro)
- Winston (largest city: Louisville)
- Yazoo (largest city: Yazoo City)

==== Counties that flipped from Republican to Democratic ====
- Copiah (largest city: Crystal Springs)

== See also ==
- 2003 Mississippi elections
