= 1999 United States gubernatorial elections =

← 1998	October 23 and November 2, 1999	2000 →

3 governorships
	Majority party	Minority party
Party	Republican	Democratic
Seats before	31	17
Seats after	30	18
Seat change	▼1	▲1
Popular vote	1,304,682	1,113,577
Percentage	49.43%	42.19%
Seats up	2	1
Seats won	1	2
- Map of the results Democratic hold Republican hold Democratic gain No election

United States gubernatorial elections were held in three states in October and November 1999. Kentucky and Mississippi held their general elections on November 2. Louisiana held the first round of its jungle primary on October 23 and did not need to hold a runoff.

The Democratic Party had a net gain of one seat, picking up an open seat in Mississippi. As of 2025, this is the last time a Democrat was elected governor of Mississippi.

== Election results ==
State	Incumbent	Party	First elected	Result	Candidates
Kentucky	Paul E. Patton	Democratic	1995	Incumbent re-elected.	✓ Paul E. Patton (Democratic) 60.7%; Peppy Martin (Republican) 22.2%; Gatewood Galbraith (Reform) 15.3%; Nailah Jumoke-Yarbrough (Natural Law) 1.2%
Louisiana	Mike Foster	Republican	1995	Incumbent re-elected.	✓ Mike Foster (Republican) 62.2%; Bill Jefferson (Democratic) 29.5%; Tom Greene (Republican) 2.7%; Phil Preis (Democratic) 1.8%
Mississippi	Kirk Fordice	Republican	1991	Incumbent term-limited. New governor elected. Democratic gain.	✓ Ronnie Musgrove (Democratic) 49.6%; Michael Parker (Republican) 48.5%; Jerry Ladner (Reform) 1.1%

== Closest races ==
States where the margin of victory was under 5%:

1. Mississippi, 1.1%

== Kentucky ==
1999 Kentucky gubernatorial election
← 1995	November 2, 1999	2003 →
- Turnout: 22.3% ▼21.5 pp
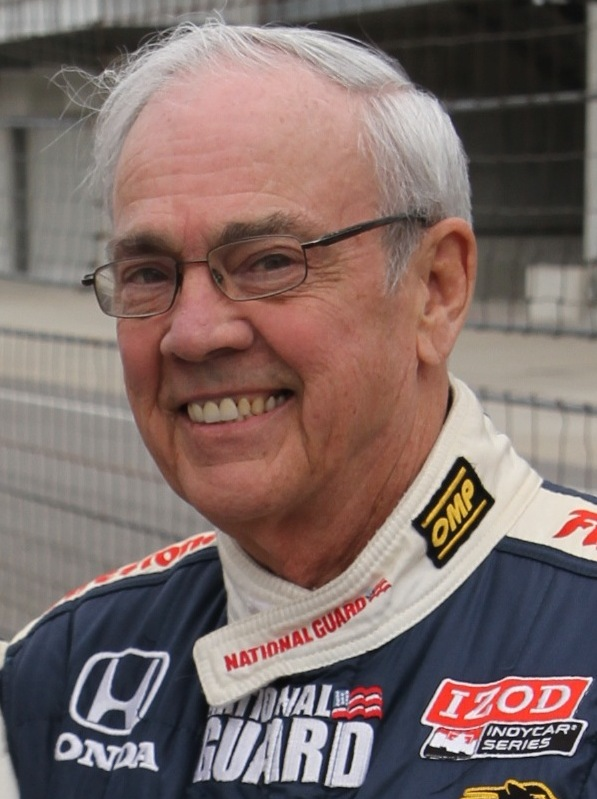

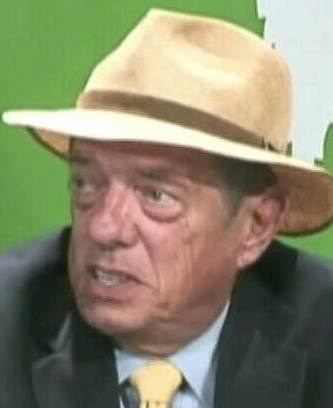
Nominee	Paul Patton	Peppy Martin	Gatewood Galbraith
Party	Democratic	Republican	Reform
Running mate	Steve Henry	Wanda Cornelius	Kathy Lyons
Popular vote	352,099	128,788	88,930
Percentage	60.7%	22.2%	15.3%
- Patton: 30–40% 40–50% 50–60% 60–70% 70–80% 80–90% Martin: 40–50% 50–60%
Governor before election
Paul E. Patton
Democratic
Elected Governor
Paul E. Patton
Democratic

The 1999 Kentucky gubernatorial election took place on November 2, 1999, for the post of Governor of Kentucky. Democratic incumbent Governor Paul E. Patton defeated Republican nominee Peppy Martin to win a second term.

== Louisiana ==
1999 Louisiana gubernatorial election
← 1995	October 23, 1999	2003 →
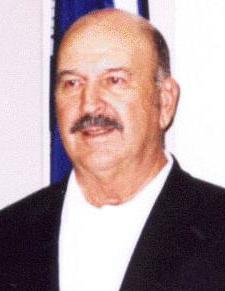

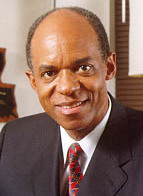
Nominee	Mike Foster	Bill Jefferson
Party	Republican	Democratic
Popular vote	805,203	382,445
Percentage	62.17%	29.53%
- Parish results Foster: 40–50% 50–60% 60–70% 70–80% 80–90% Jefferson: 40–50% 60–70%
Governor before election
Mike Foster
Republican
Elected Governor
Mike Foster
Republican

The 1999 Louisiana gubernatorial election was held on October 23, 1999, incumbent Republican Mike Foster won reelection to a second term as governor of Louisiana becoming the first Republican to ever do so.

== Mississippi ==
1999 Mississippi gubernatorial election
← 1995	November 2, 1999; January 4, 2000 (contingent election)	2003 →
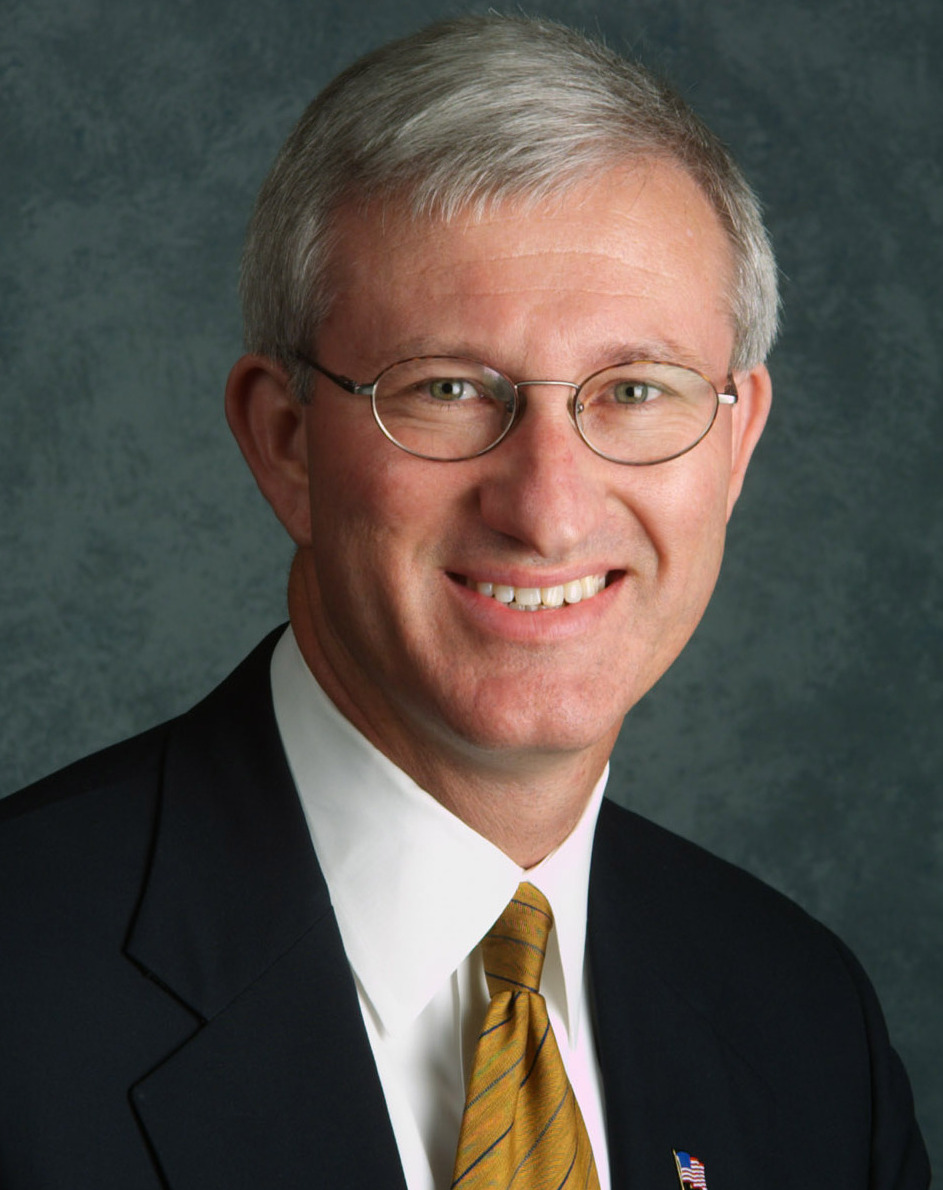

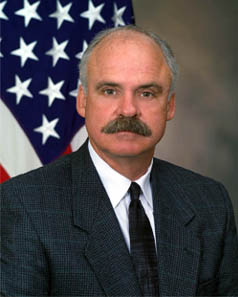
Nominee	Ronnie Musgrove	Michael Parker
Party	Democratic	Republican
Electoral vote	61	61
House vote	86	36
Popular vote	379,033	370,691
Percentage	49.62%	48.52%
- County results Musgrove: 40–50% 50–60% 60–70% 70–80% Parker: 40–50% 50–60% 60–70% 70–80%
Governor before election
Kirk Fordice
Republican
Elected Governor
Ronnie Musgrove
Democratic
via contingent election

The 1999 Mississippi gubernatorial election took place on November 2, 1999 to elect the Governor of Mississippi. Incumbent Governor Kirk Fordice, a member of the Republican Party who had been first elected in 1991, was ineligible to run for reelection due to term limits.

In the general election, Democrat Lieutenant Governor Ronnie Musgrove won a plurality of the vote over Republican Congressman Mike Parker. Per the Mississippi Constitution, since no candidate had received a majority of the vote, the election was decided by the Mississippi House of Representatives in a contingent election. On January 4, 2000, the House voted 86–36, which was nearly along partisan lines, to elect Musgrove governor. As of 2025, this remains the last time a Democrat was officially elected governor of Mississippi to date.

== See also ==
- 1999 United States elections
  - 1999 United States House of Representatives elections
