= 1999 electoral calendar =

National and federal elections held in 1999

This national electoral calendar for the year 1999 lists the national/federal direct elections to be held in 1999 in the de jure and de facto sovereign states. By-elections are excluded, though national referendums are included.

== February ==
- 20 February: Nigeria, Parliament
- 27 February: Nigeria, President

== March ==
- 7 March: Equatorial Guinea, Parliament
- 21 March: Togo, Parliament
- 30 March: Benin, Parliament

== April ==
- 9 April: Djibouti, President
- 15 April: Algeria, President

== May ==
- 17 May: Israel, Parliament

== June ==
- 2 June: South Africa, Parliament
- 7 June: Indonesia, Parliament
- 15 June: Malawi, President & Parliament

== July ==
- 4 July: Kuwait, Parliament

== September ==
- 19 September: Central African Republic, President

== October ==
- 10 October: Portugal, Parliament
- 17 October: Niger, President & Parliament (1st round)
- 19 October: Botswana, Parliament

== November ==
- 2 November: 1999 United States elections, including 1999 United States state legislative elections and 1999 United States gubernatorial elections
- 24 November: Niger, President (2nd round)
- 27 November: Elections in New Zealand, Parliament
- 28 November: Guinea-Bissau, President & Parliament (1st round)

== December ==
- 30 November-1 December: Namibia, President & Parliament
- 3-5 December: Mozambique, President & Parliament
