= 2008 United States Senate election in Kentucky =

- November 4, 2008
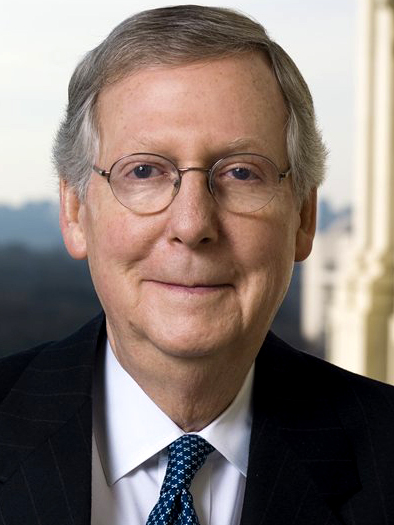

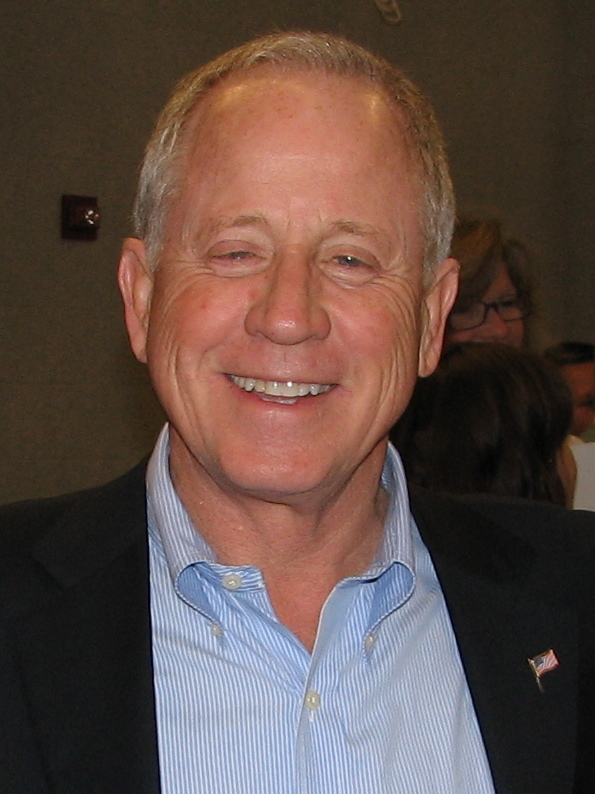
Nominee	Mitch McConnell	Bruce Lunsford
Party	Republican	Democratic
Popular vote	953,816	847,005
Percentage	52.97%	47.03%
- McConnell: 50–60% 60–70% 70–80% Lunsford: 50–60% 60–70% 70–80%
U.S. senator before election
Mitch McConnell
Republican
Elected U.S. Senator
Mitch McConnell
Republican

The 2008 United States Senate election in Kentucky was held on November 4, 2008. Minority Leader and incumbent Republican U.S. Senator Mitch McConnell won re-election to a fifth term. Although Barack Obama lost Kentucky by a 16.22% margin to John McCain in the concurrent presidential election, McConnell more narrowly kept his seat with a 5.94% margin against businessman Bruce Lunsford. This was a greatly reduced margin from when he won re-election in 2002 with a 29.4% margin. John McCain outperformed McConnell by 4.4%, while Bruce Lunsford outperformed Obama by 5.88%.

== Background ==
In 2007, Kentucky's unpopular Republican Governor Ernie Fletcher lost his re-election bid. The Democrats took control of both Houses of Congress in the 2006 mid-term elections, and in October Chuck Schumer acknowledged they were aiming for McConnell's seat.

State Auditor Crit Luallen was considered a top contender for the Democratic nomination, but she decided to remain as auditor. Lunsford was asked to run by Kentucky Governor Steve Beshear. Seven candidates competed for the Democratic Primary nomination. The primaries for both parties took place on May 20, 2008, in which Lunsford took more than 50%.

== Republican primary ==
=== Candidates ===
- Mitch McConnell, incumbent U.S. senator
- Daniel Essek

=== Results ===
Republican primary results
Party	Candidate	Votes	%
Republican	Mitch McConnell (incumbent)	168,127	86.09%
Republican	Daniel Essek	27,170	13.91%
Total votes		195,297	100.00%

== Democratic primary ==
=== Candidates ===
- Michael Cassaro
- Greg Fischer, businessman
- Bruce Lunsford, former Kentucky secretary of commerce and candidate for governor in 2003 and 2007
- James Rice
- Kenneth Stepp
- David Williams
- David Wylie

=== Results ===
Democratic primary results by county Lunsford: <40%; 40–50%; 50–60%; 60–70%; Fischer: <40%; 40–50%

Democratic primary results
Party	Candidate	Votes	%
Democratic	Bruce Lunsford	316,992	51.15%
Democratic	Greg Fischer	209,827	33.85%
Democratic	David L. Williams	34,363	5.54%
Democratic	James E. Rice	20,403	3.29%
Democratic	Michael Cassaro	17,340	2.80%
Democratic	Kenneth Stepp	13,451	2.17%
Democratic	David Wylie	7,528	1.21%
Total votes		619,904	100.00%

== General election ==
=== Candidates ===
- Bruce Lunsford (D), businessman
- Mitch McConnell (R), incumbent U.S. senator

=== Campaign ===
In October, Lunsford and McConnell were statistically tied in the polls. Larry Sabato, director of the University of Virginia Center for Politics, said, "If Lunsford is actually doing this well, it's got to be because the public is so upset by the economic meltdown and may be blaming the legislative leaders."

A debate scheduled for October 7 hosted by the League of Women Voters was canceled when incumbent McConnell decided not to participate even though Lunsford announced he wanted to debate.

On November 2, 2008, media outlets such as The Wall Street Journal noted that the website of The New Republic had reported that anti-McConnell flyers questioning the senator's sexuality, as well as the reasons for his 1967 military discharge, were being distributed in Kentucky.

=== Predictions ===
Source	Ranking	As of
The Cook Political Report	Lean R	October 23, 2008
CQ Politics	Lean R	October 31, 2008
Rothenberg Political Report	Lean R	November 2, 2008
Real Clear Politics	Tossup	November 1, 2008

=== Polling ===
Poll source	Dates administered	Lunsford	McConnell
Voter/Consumer Research	January 6–8, 2008	37%	52%
Research 2000/ Lexington Herald-Leader/ WKYT-TV	May 7–9, 2008	36%	48%
Voter/Consumer Research	May 21–22, 2008	39%	50%
Rasmussen Reports	May 22, 2008	49%	44%
Survey USA	June 13–16, 2008	46%	50%
Voter/Consumer Research	June 15–17, 2008	39%	50%
Rasmussen Reports	June 25, 2008	41%	48%
Rasmussen Reports	July 29, 2008	42%	52%
Survey USA	August 11, 2008	40%	52%
Voter/Consumer Research	September 7–9, 2008	35%	52%
Research 2000 for Daily Kos	September 15–17, 2008	37%	50%
SurveyUSA	September 21–22, 2008	46%	49%
Rasmussen Reports	September 30, 2008	42%	51%
SurveyUSA	October 20, 2008	48%	48%
Rasmussen Reports	October 21, 2008	43%	50%
Research 2000/ Lexington Herald-Leader/ WKYT-TV	October 22, 2008	43%	47%
Rasmussen Reports	October 29, 2008	44%	51%
Survey USA	November 1, 2008	45%	53%

=== Results ===
General election results
Party	Candidate	Votes	%	±%
Republican	Mitch McConnell (incumbent)	953,816	52.97%	−11.7%
Democratic	Bruce Lunsford	847,005	47.03%	+11.7%
Total votes		1,800,821	100.0%	
Republican hold				

==== By county ====
County	Precincts	Reporting	Lunsford	% Lunsford	McConnell	% McConnell	Total
Adair	16	16	2,198	30.88%	4,920	69.12%	7,118 (R)
Allen	13	13	2,331	31.85%	4,987	68.15%	7,318 (R)
Anderson	14	14	4,787	46.27%	5,558	53.73%	10,345 (R)
Ballard	13	13	1,893	46.68%	2,162	53.32%	4,055 (R)
Barren	24	24	6,735	41.15%	9,630	58.85%	16,365 (R)
Bath	12	12	2,747	61.36%	1,730	38.64%	4,477 (D)
Bell	33	33	3,494	38.83%	5,505	61.17%	8,999 (R)
Boone	60	60	15,224	30.75%	34,285	69.25%	49,509 (R)
Bourbon	18	18	4,325	52.26%	3,951	47.74%	8,276 (D)
Boyd	47	47	11,174	54.23%	9,430	45.77%	20,604 (D)
Boyle	25	25	5,854	46.90%	6,627	53.10%	12,481 (R)
Bracken	8	8	1,382	41.17%	1,975	58.83%	3,357 (R)
Breathitt	21	21	3,111	61.41%	1,955	38.59%	5,066 (D)
Breckinridge	15	15	3,736	44.02%	4,752	55.98%	8,488 (R)
Bullitt	44	44	12,501	41.85%	17,368	58.15%	29,869 (R)
Butler	12	12	1,771	33.59%	3,501	66.41%	5,272 (R)
Caldwell	13	13	2,821	46.30%	3,272	53.70%	6,093 (R)
Calloway	30	30	6,870	45.39%	8,266	54.61%	15,136 (R)
Campbell	66	66	14,789	37.55%	24,591	62.45%	39,380 (R)
Carlisle	6	6	1,220	46.51%	1,403	53.49%	2,623 (R)
Carroll	11	11	2,157	57.23%	1,612	42.77%	3,769 (D)
Carter	23	23	5,220	53.74%	4,494	46.26%	9,714 (D)
Casey	15	15	1,783	30.55%	4,053	69.45%	5,836 (R)
Christian	44	44	9,030	40.79%	13,109	59.21%	22,139 (R)
Clark	26	26	7,436	48.49%	7,898	51.51%	15,334 (R)
Clay	20	20	2,458	33.85%	4,804	66.15%	7,262 (R)
Clinton	13	13	1,029	25.42%	3,019	74.58%	4,048 (R)
Crittenden	12	12	1,615	41.59%	2,268	58.41%	3,883 (R)
Cumberland	9	9	763	28.62%	1,903	71.38%	2,666 (R)
Daviess	84	84	20,779	47.94%	22,563	52.06%	43,342 (R)
Edmonson	10	10	1,996	38.06%	3,249	61.94%	5,245 (R)
Elliott	7	7	1,830	71.99%	712	28.01%	2,542 (R)
Estill	15	15	2,162	41.36%	3,065	58.64%	5,227 (R)
Fayette	274	274	68,029	54.15%	57,605	45.85%	125,634 (R)
Fleming	18	18	2,845	50.04%	2,841	49.96%	5,686 (D)
Floyd	42	42	10,105	64.35%	5,598	35.65%	15,703 (D)
Franklin	44	44	13,888	59.00%	9,651	41.00%	23,539 (R)
Fulton	13	13	1,456	53.49%	1,266	46.51%	2,722 (D)
Gallatin	8	8	1,435	45.66%	1,708	54.34%	3,143 (R)
Garrard	13	13	2,858	40.11%	4,268	59.89%	7,126 (R)
Grant	23	23	3,408	39.33%	5,257	60.67%	8,665 (R)
Graves	30	30	7,839	48.76%	8,239	51.24%	16,078 (R)
Grayson	23	23	3,863	39.23%	5,983	60.77%	9,846 (R)
Green	10	10	1,777	35.73%	3,197	64.27%	4,974 (R)
Greenup	32	32	8,258	52.83%	7,374	47.17%	15,632 (D)
Hancock	10	10	2,298	56.09%	1,799	43.91%	4,097 (D)
Hardin	55	55	17,318	43.68%	22,326	56.32%	39,644 (R)
Harlan	35	35	4,440	45.92%	5,229	54.08%	9,669 (R)
Harrison	17	17	3,814	50.47%	3,743	49.53%	7,557 (D)
Hart	19	19	2,962	44.60%	3,680	55.40%	6,642 (R)
Henderson	42	42	11,048	56.06%	8,659	43.94%	19,707 (D)
Henry	20	20	3,194	46.52%	3,672	53.48%	6,866 (R)
Hickman	6	6	1,049	47.49%	1,160	52.51%	2,209 (R)
Hopkins	40	40	8,481	44.87%	10,419	55.13%	18,900 (R)
Jackson	14	14	1,245	24.71%	3,794	75.29%	5,039 (R)
Jefferson	515	515	195,401	55.73%	155,241	44.27%	350,642 (D)
Jessamine	37	37	7,847	39.60%	11,969	60.40%	19,816 (R)
Johnson	31	31	3,252	38.81%	5,128	61.19%	8,380 (R)
Kenton	108	108	19,217	36.26%	33,787	63.74%	53,004 (R)
Knott	30	30	3,477	62.14%	2,118	37.86%	5,595 (D)
Knox	30	30	4,329	39.01%	6,767	60.99%	11,096 (R)
LaRue	12	12	2,523	41.97%	3,489	58.03%	6,012 (R)
Laurel	45	45	6,850	31.15%	15,138	68.85%	21,988 (R)
Lawrence	18	18	2,641	47.47%	2,923	52.53%	5,564 (R)
Lee	10	10	1,073	39.77%	1,625	60.23%	2,698 (R)
Leslie	17	17	1,083	25.15%	3,224	74.85%	4,307 (R)
Letcher	32	32	4,198	51.82%	3,903	48.18%	8,101 (D)
Lewis	14	14	1,787	38.26%	2,884	61.74%	4,671 (R)
Lincoln	17	17	4,119	45.47%	4,939	54.53%	9,058 (R)
Livingston	10	10	2,142	47.35%	2,382	52.65%	4,524 (R)
Logan	20	20	4,379	40.70%	6,379	59.30%	10,758 (R)
Lyon	6	6	1,821	47.80%	1,989	52.20%	3,810 (R)
McCracken	54	54	13,006	42.91%	17,303	57.09%	30,309 (D)
McCreary	18	18	1,576	30.41%	3,606	69.59%	5,182 (R)
McLean	8	8	2,225	50.55%	2,177	49.45%	4,402 (D)
Madison	56	56	14,657	45.96%	17,237	54.04%	31,894 (R)
Magoffin	14	14	2,719	58.81%	1,904	41.19%	4,623 (D)
Marion	17	17	4,304	57.68%	3,158	42.32%	7,462 (D)
Marshall	25	25	7,463	48.94%	7,785	51.06%	15,248 (R)
Martin	14	14	1,203	33.19%	2,422	66.81%	3,625 (R)
Mason	20	20	3,095	44.58%	3,847	55.42%	6,942 (R)
Meade	18	18	5,149	46.58%	5,905	53.42%	11,054 (R)
Menifee	6	6	1,520	61.51%	951	38.49%	2,471 (D)
Mercer	17	17	4,338	44.17%	5,484	55.83%	9,822 (R)
Metcalfe	12	12	1,766	44.03%	2,245	55.97%	4,011 (R)
Monroe	12	12	1,237	27.16%	3,318	72.84%	4,555 (R)
Montgomery	18	18	5,526	54.25%	4,660	45.75%	10,186 (D)
Morgan	12	12	2,475	57.03%	1,865	42.97%	4,340 (D)
Muhlenberg	26	26	7,436	57.90%	5,406	42.10%	12,842 (R)
Nelson	26	26	8,823	49.60%	8,965	50.40%	17,788 (R)
Nicholas	5	5	1,737	59.47%	1,184	40.53%	2,921 (D)
Ohio	25	25	4,664	47.08%	5,242	52.92%	9,906 (R)
Oldham	34	34	10,204	35.25%	18,744	64.75%	28,948 (R)
Owen	13	13	2,019	42.93%	2,684	57.07%	4,703 (R)
Owsley	8	8	559	34.46%	1,063	65.54%	1,622 (R)
Pendleton	12	12	2,155	37.97%	3,520	62.03%	5,675 (R)
Perry	37	37	5,026	49.10%	5,211	50.90%	10,237 (R)
Pike	57	57	12,912	57.16%	9,679	42.84%	22,591 (D)
Powell	11	11	2,863	57.91%	2,081	42.09%	4,944 (D)
Pulaski	57	57	8,108	32.20%	17,072	67.80%	25,180 (R)
Robertson	5	5	498	49.21%	514	50.79%	1,012 (R)
Rockcastle	14	14	1,837	30.55%	4,177	69.45%	6,014 (R)
Rowan	18	18	4,710	58.71%	3,312	41.29%	8,022 (D)
Russell	16	16	2,450	33.67%	4,827	66.33%	7,277 (R)
Scott	35	35	9,238	47.36%	10,267	52.64%	19,505 (R)
Shelby	33	33	7,546	41.15%	10,790	58.85%	18,336 (R)
Simpson	13	13	3,118	44.29%	3,922	55.71%	7,040 (R)
Spencer	11	11	3,159	39.64%	4,811	60.36%	7,970 (R)
Taylor	20	20	4,163	38.52%	6,644	61.48%	10,807 (R)
Todd	13	13	1,772	36.89%	3,032	63.11%	4,804 (R)
Trigg	14	14	2,637	40.76%	3,833	59.24%	6,470 (R)
Trimble	12	12	1,927	50.87%	1,861	49.13%	3,788 (D)
Union	16	16	3,335	55.46%	2,678	44.54%	6,013 (D)
Warren	63	63	19,162	43.84%	24,547	56.16%	43,709 (R)
Washington	14	14	2,316	45.04%	2,826	54.96%	5,142 (R)
Wayne	19	19	3,045	43.30%	3,987	56.70%	7,032 (R)
Webster	14	14	3,000	54.39%	2,516	45.61%	5,516 (D)
Whitley	36	36	4,849	36.37%	8,484	63.63%	13,333 (R)
Wolfe	8	8	1,886	62.74%	1,120	37.26%	3,006 (D)
Woodford	16	16	5,903	48.65%	6,231	51.35%	12,134 (R)

Counties that flipped from Republican to Democratic

- Bourbon (largest city: Paris)
- Carroll (largest city: Carrollton)
- Carter (largest city: Grayson)
- Hancock (largest city: Hawesville)
- Magoffin (largest city: Salyersville)
- Trimble (largest city: Bedford)
- Webster (largest city: Providence)
- McLean (largest city: Livermore)
- Morgan (largest city: West Liberty)
- Harrison (largest city: Cynthiana)
- Henderson (largest city: Henderson)
- Letcher (largest city: Jenkins)
- Muhlenberg (largest city: Central City)
- Greenup (largest city: Flatwoods)
- Fulton (largest city: Fulton)
- Fleming (largest city: Flemingsburg)
- Lincoln (largest city: Stanford)
- Bath (largest city: Owingsville)
- Fayette (largest city: Lexington)
- Marion (largest city: Lebanon)
- Menifee (largest city: Frenchburg)
- Nicholas (largest city: Carlisle)
- Rowan (largest city: Morehead)
- Franklin (largest city: Frankfort)
- Jefferson (largest city: Louisville)

=== By congressional district ===
McConnell won four of six congressional districts.

District	McConnell	Lunsford	Representative
1st	56%	44%	Ed Whitfield
2nd	56%	44%	Ron Lewis (110th Congress)
2nd	56%	44%	Brett Guthrie (111th Congress)
3rd	44%	56%	John Yarmuth
4th	59%	41%	Geoff Davis
5th	56%	44%	Hal Rogers
6th	49%	51%	Ben Chandler

== See also ==
- 2008 United States Senate elections
