= Gatewood Galbraith =

American attorney and author (1947–2012)

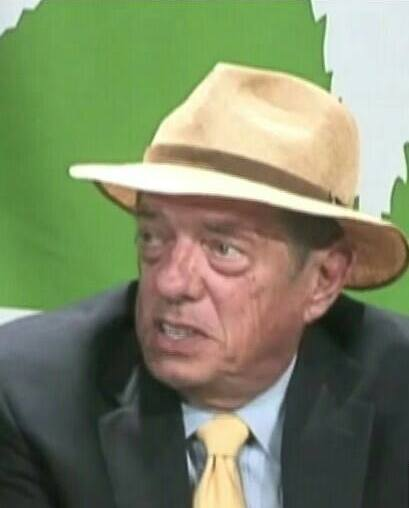
- Galbraith in 2011
- Born: Louis Gatewood Galbraith; January 23, 1947; Carlisle, Kentucky, U.S.
- Died: January 4, 2012 (aged 64); Lexington, Kentucky, U.S.
- Education: University of Kentucky
- Occupations: Attorney; author; political candidate
- Political party: Democratic (before 1999; 2007–2011); Reform (1999–2000); Independent (2000–2003, 2011–2012)

Louis Gatewood Galbraith (January 23, 1947 – January 4, 2012) was an American author, attorney, and perennial candidate who ran unsuccessfully for numerous state and federal offices in Kentucky from 1983 to 2011.

== Early life and education ==
Born in Carlisle, Kentucky, to Henry Clay and Dollie Galbraith, on January 23, 1947, Gatewood was the fourth of seven children. He graduated from the University of Kentucky in 1974 and from the University of Kentucky College of Law in 1977.

== Legal career ==
Galbraith's law practice focused on criminal law and personal injury civil actions.

In a Kentucky marijuana trafficking case in 2001–02, Judge John D. Minton Jr. granted a stay after the appeal in the case had been denied by the Kentucky Court of Appeals in 2001. Shortly after this, a review of tax law changes led to the enactment of the Marijuana Tax Stamp by the 2003 General Assembly. On March 3, 2011, Governor Steve Beshear signed what he declared a "landmark corrections reform bill" into law which decriminalizes personal use of up eight ounces of marijuana, reducing it to a ticketable offense.

== Political activism ==
Galbraith worked closely with his longtime friend and supporter Norm Davis, gun rights advocate, activist and founder of the grassroots organization "Take Back Kentucky", in support of "smaller government and preservation of our constitutional freedoms and rights with-in the commonwealth."

Galbraith supported the legalization of recreational marijuana use, arguing that the framers of the US Constitution "did not say we have a Constitutional right to possess alcohol. They said we have a Constitutional right to privacy in our homes, under which fits the possession of an extremely poisonous alcohol. Now this is the law in Kentucky today. In fact, it is these rulings that keep the Kentucky State Police from kicking down the doors of people possessing alcohol in Kentucky's 77 'dry' counties right now and hauling their butts off to jail. Now Marijuana is a demonstrably less harmful substance than alcohol and presents far less of threat to public welfare. So it also fits in a person's right to privacy in their home. It's beyond the police power of the state as long as I don't sell it and it's for my own personal use."

Galbraith appeared in the 2010 Michael P. Henning documentary film Hempsters: Plant the Seed, along with Woody Harrelson, Ralph Nader, Willie Nelson, Merle Haggard and Julia Butterfly Hill. He was featured in the documentary film A NORML Life.

== Political campaigns ==
Galbraith ran for various offices in Kentucky, including agriculture commissioner, attorney general, and for a seat in the United States House of Representatives. Galbraith also ran for Governor five times – as a Democrat in 1991, 1995, and 2007, as a Reform Party candidate in 1999, and lastly as an independent in 2011.

Galbraith was a vocal advocate for ending the prohibition of cannabis and was known for his quips.

Included in Galbraith's platform were campaign promises of implementing a freeze on college tuition, a $5,000 grant or voucher provided to motivated high school graduates to any college or vocational school, incorporating more technology into the education process, restoring hemp as an agricultural crop, ending cannabis prohibition in Kentucky, restoring of voting and gun rights of non-violent felons, agricultural market development, stricter environmental protections, recreational and tourism development, water standard enforcement, expansion of fish and wildlife programs, abolition of state worker furloughs, expansion of energy development, Internet access to all counties, abolition of the income tax for those who earn fifty thousand dollars or less, small business tax exemptions, job development, a return investment policy, the establishment of regional economic development offices, marketing Kentucky's signature industries, the prohibition of fracking and mountaintop removal mining. He raised $100,000 of his $500,000 budget and was endorsed by the United Mine Workers of America, the first time the union had backed an independent.

=== 1983 run for Agriculture Commissioner ===
Galbraith ran for Kentucky Agriculture Commissioner after incumbent Democrat Alben Barkley II decided to run instead for lieutenant governor. Galbraith ran as a Democrat and ranked last among four candidates in the Democratic primary with 12 percent of the vote. David Boswell won with a plurality of 35 percent.

=== 1991 gubernatorial election ===
In 1991 Galbraith ran for Governor of Kentucky. He ranked last in a four candidate Democratic primary with five percent of the vote. Lieutenant Governor Brereton Jones won the primary with a plurality of 38 percent.

=== 1995 gubernatorial election ===
Galbraith ran for governor again at the end of Brereton Jones's term. In the Democratic primary, he ranked fourth in a five candidate field with nine percent of the vote. Lieutenant Governor Paul Patton won with a plurality of 45 percent of the vote. In the general election, Galbraith decided to run as a write-in candidate and got just 0.4 percent of the vote.

=== 1999 gubernatorial election ===
Galbraith ran again for governor in 1999. This time he ran on the Reform Party ticket and got 15 percent of the vote, the best statewide general election performance of his career. The Republican candidates were Peppy Martin for governor and Wanda Cornelius for lieutenant governor. Incumbent Democratic Governor Paul Patton won re-election with 61 percent of the vote.

=== 2000 congressional election ===
Galbraith ran for Congress in Kentucky's 6th congressional district in 2000 as an independent. Incumbent Republican U.S. Congressman Ernie Fletcher won re-election with 53 percent of the vote. Democratic nominee and former U.S. Congressman Scotty Baesler got 35 percent of the vote. Galbraith ranked third with 12 percent.

=== 2002 congressional election ===
In 2002, Galbraith decided to run in the 6th District again. Incumbent Republican U.S. Congressman Ernie Fletcher won re-election with 72 percent of the vote. No Democrat filed to run against him. Galbraith, as an independent, ranked second with 26 percent of the vote, his highest percentage in an election.

=== 2003 run for Kentucky Attorney General ===
Galbraith decided to run for Kentucky Attorney General as an independent. Democratic State Representative Greg Stumbo won the election with 48 percent of the vote. Republican nominee Jack Wood ranked second with 42 percent of the vote. Galbraith ranked third with 11 percent.

=== 2007 gubernatorial election ===
Galbraith decided to run for governor a fourth time. This time, he decided to run as a Democrat, the first time since 1995. In the Democratic primary, Galbraith ranked fifth in a six-candidate field with six percent of the vote. However, he carried Nicholas County with a 32 percent plurality. Lieutenant Governor Steve Beshear won with a plurality of 41 percent of the vote. Bruce Lunsford ranked second with 21 percent. Former Lieutenant Governor Steve Henry ranked third with 17 percent. Speaker of the Kentucky House Jody Richards ranked fourth with 13 percent.

=== 2011 gubernatorial election ===
In 2011, Galbraith decided to run for governor a fifth time. This time, he decided to run as an independent. Incumbent Democratic Governor Steve Beshear won re-election with 56 percent of the vote. Republican State Senator David Williams of Burkesville, the President of the State Senate, ranked second with 35 percent. Galbraith trailed with nine percent.

== Death ==
Galbraith died from natural causes, including complications from emphysema, on January 4, 2012, at his home in Lexington, Kentucky.

== Published work ==
- Galbraith, Gatewood (2004). The Last Free Man In America Meets The Synthetic Subversion. Outskirts Press. ISBN 1-932672-35-4.
