= Steve Pence =

American politician (born 1953)

- Pence in 2003

53rd Lieutenant Governor of Kentucky
- In office December 9, 2003 – December 11, 2007
- Governor: Ernie Fletcher
- Preceded by: Steve Henry
- Succeeded by: Daniel Mongiardo

United States Attorney for the Western District of Kentucky
- In office September 24, 2001 – May 2003
- President: George W. Bush
- Preceded by: Steven S. Reed
- Succeeded by: David L. Huber

Personal details
- Born: December 22, 1953 (age 72) Louisville, Kentucky, U.S.
- Party: Republican
- Spouse: Ruth Ann Cox
- Children: 5
- Education: Eastern Kentucky University (BS, MBA); University of Kentucky (JD)
- Profession: Attorney

Stephen B. Pence (born December 22, 1953) is an American attorney who was the 53rd lieutenant governor of Kentucky from 2003 to 2007. He took office with fellow Republican Ernie Fletcher in December 2003.

== Education ==
Pence received BS (1976) and MBA (1978) degrees from Eastern Kentucky University, and a Juris Doctor from the University of Kentucky in 1981. He received an Honorary Doctorate of Laws from Eastern Kentucky University in 2004.

== Early career ==
After law school, Pence worked as an assistant attorney general of Kentucky from 1981 to 1982. From 1982 to 1987 he served active duty in the JAG Corps and was stationed in the Federal Republic of Germany. Pence was an Assistant United States Attorney for the Western District of Kentucky from 1990 to 1995 where he prosecuted a series of high-profile corruption cases, including those in Operation BOPTROT, an FBI investigation that ended in the convictions of over 20 legislators and lobbyists. He received the Kentucky Bar Association's "Outstanding Lawyer Award". He later became partner with the Pedley, Zielke, Gordinier and Pence law firm (1995–2001).

== US Attorney ==
Pence was appointed by President George W. Bush as the United States Attorney for the Western District of Kentucky and was confirmed by the U.S. Senate to this position on September 24, 2001.

== Lieutenant governor ==
He left the U.S. Attorney's Office in May 2003, to be the Republican Party's nominee for lieutenant governor when Ernie Flecher's original running mate, Hunter Bates, was disqualified from the ticket. They were elected in November 2003. He was the first Republican lieutenant governor to be elected in Kentucky in over five decades. As lieutenant governor, he served at various times as Secretary of the Justice and Public Safety Cabinet, Commissioner of State Police and Director of Homeland Security. He also was chairman of the Louisville Arena Task Force.

On May 31, 2006, just a few weeks after Fletcher had been indicted on charges relating to the practices of hiring, promoting, and firing based on political affiliation, Pence he announced that he would not run for re-election with Fletcher in 2007, had no plans for any other elective office, and would no longer serve as Secretary of the Justice & Public Safety Cabinet. Less than two weeks later, Fletcher accelerated Pence's departure from the Justice Cabinet and named Kentucky National Guard Adjutant General Norman Arflack as Pence's replacement. Fletcher also asked Pence to resign from his role of lieutenant governor, but Pence refused, indicating that he serves as an elected representative of the people. Although Pence maintained that he did not separate himself from Fletcher's re-election effort in order to run for public office himself, there was speculation that he has not ruled out the possibility at some point in the future. In June 2006, Governor Fletcher announced that Robert "Robbie" Rudolph, secretary of the state Finance Cabinet, would be his running mate in his 2007 re-election campaign. As momentum for Kentucky's gubernatorial race began to build, Pence announced in January 2007 that he would not be a candidate for governor, and planned to return to the practice of law once his term of office ended. On February 25, 2007, Pence formally endorsed former Congresswoman Anne Northup over Fletcher in the 2007 governor's race. Fletcher was not elected to a second term, winning the primary election against Northup but ultimately losing the general election to Democrat Steve Beshear.

== Current career ==
In February 2008, Pence retired as a colonel from the United States Army Reserve, where he served as a military judge in the JAG Corps. He was awarded the Legion of Merit for his service. In April 2008, Pence was as one of the initial 38 inductees into the Doss High School Hall of Fame.

Pence now practices law in Louisville, Kentucky.

Pence served as Rick Pitino's attorney during the 2017–18 NCAA Division I men's basketball corruption scandal and Pitino's subsequent ouster from the University of Louisville and lawsuit against Adidas.

In March 2018, Pence settled a complaint with the U.S. Securities and Exchange Commission. The commission alleged Pence misled auditors in relation to his interaction with convicted felon Wilbur Anthony Huff and his role as chairman of General Employment Enterprises, Inc. Pence denied any wrongdoing.

== Personal ==
Pence is married to the former Ruth Ann Cox, a practicing attorney in Louisville, Kentucky. Pence has five children: Eileen Pence, Peter Pence, Kay Pence, Joseph Pence and Paige Pence.

Legal offices
Preceded by Steven S. Reed	United States Attorney for the Western District of Kentucky; 2001–2003	Succeeded by David L. Huber
Political offices
Preceded by Steve Henry	Lieutenant Governor of Kentucky; 2003–2007	Succeeded by Daniel Mongiardo
Party political offices
Preceded by Wanda Cornelius	Republican nominee for Lieutenant Governor of Kentucky; 2003	Succeeded by Robbie Rudolph
