= 1999 United States elections =

- ← 1997 1998 1999 2000 2001 → Off-year elections
- Election day: November 2

Congressional special elections
- Seats contested: 3
- Net seat change: 0

Gubernatorial elections
- Seats contested: 3
- Net seat change: Democratic +1
- 1999 gubernatorial election results map

Legend
- Democratic hold Republican hold Democratic gain No election

Elections were held on Tuesday, November 2, 1999, in which no members of the Congress were standing for election. However, there were three gubernatorial races, state legislative elections in four states, numerous citizen initiatives, mayoral races in several major cities, and a variety of local offices on the ballot.

President Bill Clinton's Democrats won two out of three governorships that were contested: Kentucky, Louisiana, and Mississippi; all states in the south, Democrats won the Kentucky governorship and the Mississippi governorship, the latter state Clinton did not win in any of his two presidential elections; and Republicans retained Louisiana's governorship, Louisiana voted for Clinton in both 1992 and 1996. Al Gore lost all three of these states in 2000 presidential election.

== Federal elections ==
=== U.S. House of Representatives special elections ===
In 1999, three special elections to fill vacancies in the House of Representatives were held. They were for California's 42nd congressional district, Georgia's 6th congressional district, and Louisiana's 1st congressional district.

== State elections ==
=== Gubernatorial elections ===
Three states held elections for governor in 1999. Kentucky and Mississippi voted on November 2. Louisiana's election dates do not coincide with that of most states: Louisiana held its open primary on October 23. A runoff election was not needed.

=== Other statewide elections ===
In the three states which held regularly scheduled state general elections, elections for state executive branch offices of Lieutenant Governor (in a separate election in Louisiana and Mississippi and on the same ticket as the gubernatorial nominee in Kentucky), Secretary of state, state Treasurer, state Auditor, state Attorney General, and Commissioners of Insurance and Agriculture were held. In addition, there was also elections for each states' respective state Supreme Courts and state appellate courts.

=== State legislative elections ===
Elections were held for 7 legislative chambers in four states. Both chambers of the Northern Mariana Islands legislature were up.

Democrats maintained control of the Mississippi and Louisiana legislatures, while Republicans maintained control of the lower house in New Jersey and the upper house in Virginia. Republicans also flipped the Virginia House of Delegates.

== Local elections ==
=== Mayoral elections ===
Many major American cities held their mayoral elections in 1999.

- Baltimore - Martin O'Malley (D) was elected, succeeding Kurt Schmoke (D).
- Columbus - Michael B. Coleman (D) was elected, succeeding Greg Lashutka (R).
- Chicago - Incumbent Mayor Richard M. Daley (D) was re-elected. Chicago was the most populous city to hold a mayoral election in 1999.
- Houston - Incumbent mayor Lee P. Brown was reelected
- Philadelphia - Mayor John F. Street (D) was elected, succeeding Ed Rendell (D).
- San Francisco - Mayor Willie Brown (D) was reelected.
