= 1999 Louisiana gubernatorial election =

- October 23, 1999
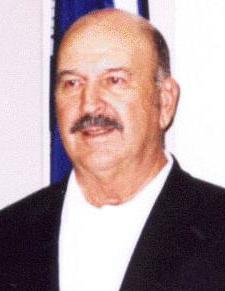

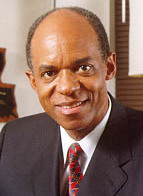
Nominee	Mike Foster	Bill Jefferson
Party	Republican	Democratic
Popular vote	805,203	382,445
Percentage	62.17%	29.53%
- Parish results Foster: 40–50% 50–60% 60–70% 70–80% 80–90% Jefferson: 40–50% 60–70%
Governor before election
Mike Foster
Republican
Elected Governor
Mike Foster
Republican

The 1999 Louisiana gubernatorial election was held on October 23, 1999 to elect the governor of Louisiana. Republican incumbent Mike Foster was re-elected to a second term in office over Democratic U.S. representative Bill Jefferson.

Foster was the first Republican ever elected to a second term as governor of Louisiana.

== Background ==
In 1991, Louisiana elections (except for U.S. presidential elections) were conducted under a variation of the open primary system called the "jungle primary," in which candidates of all parties were listed on one ballot. Unless one candidate received a majority in the first round, a run-off election would be held between the top two candidates, who may be members of the same party.

In this election, the first round of voting was held on October 23, 1999, and the runoff was scheduled to be held on November 20.

== Primary election ==
=== Candidates ===
- Belinda Alexandrenko (Reform)
- Sid Baron (Independent)
- Charles V. Bellone (Democratic)
- Berl Bush (Democratic)
- Mike Foster, incumbent governor of Louisiana since 1996 (Republican)
- Tom Greene, state senator from Maringouin (Republican)
- Bill Jefferson, U.S. representative from New Orleans (Democratic)
- Ronnie Glynn Johnson (Independent)
- Bob McElroy (Democratic)
- Phil Preis, Newellton attorney and 1995 candidate for governor (Democratic)
- Messiah Darryl Paul Ward (Democratic)

=== Polling ===
Poll source	Date(s)	Sample size	Margin of error	Mike Foster (R)	William J. Jefferson (D)	Other / undecided (Note: Calculated by taking the difference of 100% and all other candidates combined.)
Mason-Dixon Polling & Strategy	October 13, 1999	626	—	55%	22%	23%
University of New Orleans	October 7, 1999	803	—	48%	20%	32%
Southern Media & Opinion Research	October 6, 1999	500	—	64%	16%	20%

=== Results ===
Foster easily won reelection with 62.17 percent of the vote. Because Foster won more a majority, there was no runoff. The only parishes carried by Jefferson were his home of Orleans and East Carroll, where Jefferson's birthplace, Lake Providence serves as the parish seat. Democratic candidates collectively won 33.89 percent of the vote.

1999 Louisiana gubernatorial election
Party	Candidate	Votes	%	±%
Republican	Mike Foster (incumbent)	805,203	62.17	
Democratic	Bill Jefferson	382,445	29.53	
Republican	Tom Greene	35,434	2.74	
Democratic	Phil Preis	23,445	1.81	
Democratic	Berl Bush	12,496	0.96	
Reform	Belinda Alexandrenko	8,978	0.69	
Democratic	Messiah Darryl Paul Ward	7,645	0.59	
Democratic	Bob McElroy	7,511	0.58	
Democratic	Charles V. Bellone	5,432	0.42	
Independent	Sid Baron	3,669	0.28	
Independent	Ronnie Glynn Johnson	2,946	0.23	
Turnout		1,295,204	100	
Republican hold		Swing		
