= 1999 United States state legislative elections =

- November 2, 1999

8 legislative chambers in 4 states
	Majority party	Minority party
Party	Democratic	Republican
Chambers before	50 (Note: The Washington House of Representatives was controlled by a power-sharing agreement between Democrats and Republicans. Thus, it is not counted in this total.) (Note: The Virginia House of Delegates was split. Thus, it is not included in the prior total.)	47 (Note: Republicans gained control of the Kentucky Senate during the year due to party switching)
Chambers after	49 (Note: The New Hampshire Senate became evenly-split due to a special election. Thus, it is not included in the prior total.)	48
Overall change	▼1	▲1
- Map of upper house elections: Democrats retained control Republicans retained control Split body formed No regularly-scheduled elections

- Map of lower house elections: Democrats retained control Republicans gained control Republicans retained control No regularly-scheduled elections

The 1999 United States state legislative elections were held on November 2, 1999, alongside other elections. Elections were held for 7 legislative chambers in four states. Both chambers of the Northern Mariana Islands legislature were up.

Democrats maintained control of the Mississippi and Louisiana legislatures, while Republicans maintained control of the lower house in New Jersey and the upper house in Virginia. Republicans had won a 1997 special election to claim a 21-19 majority in the Virginia Senate after Democrat Charles L. Waddell resigned his seat. Republicans maintained this majority in 1999, which gave them their first-ever elected majority in history. Republicans flipped the Virginia House of Delegates, which was previously tied, resulting in the first-ever Republican majority.

Additionally, in the summer of 1999, a Democratic senator died in the New Hampshire Senate and was succeeded by a Republican in a special election, switching that chamber from Democratic control to tied.

== Summary table ==
Regularly scheduled elections were held in 7 of the 99 state legislative chambers in the United States. Nationwide, regularly scheduled elections were held for 538 of the 7,383 legislative seats. This table only covers regularly scheduled elections; additional special elections took place concurrently with these regularly scheduled elections.

State	Upper House				Lower House			
State	Seats up	Total	% up	Term	Seats up	Total	% up	Term
Louisiana	39	39	100	4	105	105	100	4
Mississippi	52	52	100	4	122	122	100	4
New Jersey	0	40	0	2/4 (Note: The upper houses of Arkansas, Delaware, Florida, Hawaii, Illinois, Minnesota, New Jersey, and Texas use a 2-4-4 term length system.)	80	80	100	2
Virginia	40	40	100	4	100	100	100	2

== State summaries ==
=== Louisiana ===
All seats of the Louisiana State Senate and the Louisiana House of Representatives were up for election to four-year terms in single-member districts. Democrats maintained control of both chambers.

Louisiana State Senate
Party	Before	After	Change
Democratic	26	26	Steady
Republican	13	13	Steady
Total	39	39	

Louisiana House of Representatives
Party	Before	After	Change
Democratic	78	74	▼4
Republican	27	31	▲4
Total	105	105	

=== Mississippi ===
All seats of the Mississippi State Senate and the Mississippi House of Representatives were up for election to four-year terms in single-member districts. Democrats maintained control of both houses.

Mississippi State Senate
Party	Before	After	Change
Democratic	34	34	Steady
Republican	18	18	Steady
Total	52	52	

Mississippi House of Representatives
Party	Before	After	Change
Democratic	86	86	Steady
Republican	33	33	Steady
Independent	3	3	Steady
Total	122	122	

=== New Jersey ===
All seats of the New Jersey General Assembly were up for election. Assembly members were elected to two-year terms in two-member districts. Republicans retained control.

General Assembly
Party	Before	After	Change
Democratic	32	35	▲3
Republican	48	45	▼3
Total	80	80	

=== Virginia ===
All seats of the Senate of Virginia and the Virginia House of Delegates were up for election in single-member districts. Senators were elected to four-year terms, while delegates served terms of two years. Republicans maintained control of the Senate and flipped the House of Delegates, which was previously tied.

Senate of Virginia
Party	Before	After	Change
Democratic	19	19	Steady
Republican	21	21	Steady
Total	40	40	

Virginia House of Delegates
Party	Before	After	Change
Republican	49	52	▲3
Independent	1 (Note: Independent Lacey Putney sided with the Republicans, deadlocking the chamber.)	1	Steady
Democratic	50	47	▼3
Total	100	100	

== Territorial and federal district summaries ==
=== Northern Mariana Islands ===
All seats of the Northern Mariana Islands House of Representatives and half of the Northern Mariana Islands Senate are up for election. Senators are elected to four-year terms, and Representatives are elected to two-year terms. Republicans maintained control of both houses.

Senate
Party	Before	After	Change
Republican	8	6	▼2
Democratic	1	2	▲1
Independent	0	1	▲1
Total	9	9	

House of Representatives
Party	Before	After	Change
Republican	13	11	▼2
Democratic	5	6	▲1
Independent	0	1	▲1
Total	18	18	
