= Taylor Opportunity Program for Students =

Scholarship program in Louisiana

The Taylor Opportunity Program for Students (TOPS) is a scholarship program available to prospective college students in the state of Louisiana in the United States. Specifically, the program is available to students who attend a public college or university in Louisiana, an institution that is part of the Louisiana Community and Technical College System, or one that is a part of the Louisiana Association of Independent Colleges and Universities. Four tiers of TOPS scholarships are awarded: the TOPS Opportunity Award, the TOPS Performance Award, the TOPS Honor Award and the TOPS Tech Award.

== History ==
Sources differ about when the Taylor Opportunity Program for Students began: according to The Daily Advertiser, "Some say TOPS began in 1989 as the Louisiana College Tuition Plan when Gov. Buddy Roemer signed ACT 789 into law." This plan was inspired by businessman Patrick F. Taylor and his commitment to investing in educational opportunities. In 1997, House Bill 2154 was signed into law by Governor Mike Foster; this bill created TOPS, which was then known as the Tuition Opportunity Program for Students. The bill also eliminated all previous scholarship programs. The first students to receive grants from TOPS started their freshman year of college in the fall of 1998. In 2008, the program was renamed the Taylor Opportunity Program for Students in honor of Taylor, after Governor Bobby Jindal signed Act 352.

== Eligibility ==
Initially, to be eligible for TOPS, students had to have a grade point average of 2.5 or higher in their high school curriculum, as well as a score on the ACT that was at least as high as the national average. As of 2017, these criteria had not changed significantly in the two decades since then. The eligibility criteria are now a 2.5 GPA or higher on the TOPS core high school curriculum, a score of 20 or higher on the composite ACT, and completion of the Free Application for Federal Student Aid application. In addition, students must have graduated from a high school in Louisiana, and their parents must live in the state. When Governor Roemer signed the Louisiana College Tuition Plan into law in 1989, it included an income cap; this provision was eliminated when the TOPS bill was signed into law in 1997, making the program available to all students in the state with sufficient academic performance.
