= Peppy Martin =

American public relations executive (born 1946)

Personal details
- Born: Josephine Ellen Martin; May 1, 1946 (age 79)
- Party: Republican (before 2006); Democratic (2006–present)
- Education: Connecticut College (BA); Bryn Mawr College (MA)

Peppy Martin (born Josephine Ellen Martin; May 1, 1946) is an American public relations executive who is also a perennial candidate for office in the state of Kentucky; she was the unsuccessful Republican nominee in the 1999 gubernatorial election, and later unsuccessfully ran in the 2003 Republican primary for Auditor of Public Accounts and the 2023 Democratic primary for governor.

== Early career ==
Martin began her political career as an intern for U.S. Senator Thruston Ballard Morton. In 1971, she worked in the office of Governor Louie B. Nunn. She then launched a career in public relations, eventually running her own firm in Hart County, Kentucky. As of 2023, she resides in Glenview, Kentucky.

Martin legally changed her name to "Peppy" from her given name of Josephine Ellen when she unsuccessfully ran for a seat in the Kentucky General Assembly in the 1970s.

== Campaigns ==
In 1999, Martin ran for governor against Paul E. Patton, the Democratic incumbent. Through a change in the Kentucky Constitution, Patton became the state's first governor eligible to seek a second consecutive term since James Garrard in 1799. Martin's running mate was Wanda Cornelius, a school board member from Taylor County. In the Republican primary, Martin defeated perennial candidate David Lynn Williams (not to be confused with then-State Senator David L. Williams). The Martin-Cornelius ticket lost to incumbent governor Patton and Lieutenant Governor Steve Henry in a landslide in the general election.

Martin announced her intent to run for president as a Reform Party candidate in 1996 and, later, as a Reform candidate for the United States Congress in 2000, though she never qualified to appear on the ballot in either race. In 2003, Martin sought the Republican nomination for the office of Kentucky Auditor of Public Accounts, ultimately losing in the primary. Although she announced that she would be a Democratic candidate for Governor of Kentucky in 2007, Martin ultimately failed to appear on the ballot. Martin unsuccessfully challenged incumbent Andy Beshear in the Democratic primary of the 2023 Kentucky gubernatorial election.

== Electoral history ==
Kentucky gubernatorial election, 1999
Party	Candidate	Votes	%	±%
Democratic	Paul E. Patton	352,099	60.70%	+9.81%
Republican	Peppy Martin	128,788	22.20%	−26.51%
Reform	Gatewood Galbraith	88,930	15.33%	+14.93%
Natural Law	Nailah Jumoke-Yarbrough	6,934	1.20%	
Write-ins		3,323	0.57%	
Majority		223,311	38.50%	+36.32%
Turnout		580,074		
Democratic hold		Swing		

Kentucky Auditor of Public Accounts Republican primary results, 2003
Party	Candidate	Votes	%
Republican	Linda Greenwell	50,366	40.42
Republican	Peppy Martin	32,421	26.02
Republican	Basha Cannon Roberts	25,216	20.24
Republican	Osi Onyekwuluje	16,596	13.32
Total votes		124,599	100

Kentucky Gubernatorial Democratic primary results, 2023
Party	Candidate	Votes	%
Democratic	Andy Beshear (incumbent)	176,589	91.3
Democratic	Geoff Young	9,865	5.1
Democratic	Peppy Martin	6,913	3.6
Total votes		193,367	100.0

== See also ==
- Kentucky gubernatorial election, 1999

Party political offices
Preceded by Larry Forgy	Republican nominee for Governor of Kentucky; 1999	Succeeded by Ernie Fletcher
