= Steve Henry =

American politician and orthopedic surgeon (born 1953)

- Henry in 2001

52nd Lieutenant Governor of Kentucky
- In office December 12, 1995 – December 9, 2003
- Governor: Paul E. Patton
- Preceded by: Paul E. Patton
- Succeeded by: Steve Pence

41st Chair of the National Lieutenant Governors Association
- In office 2000–2001
- Preceded by: Olene Walker
- Succeeded by: Gary Sherrer

Member of the Jefferson County Commission from District A
- In office November 12, 1992 – December 12, 1995
- Preceded by: Tom Eifler
- Succeeded by: Russ Maple

Personal details
- Born: Stephen L. Henry; October 8, 1953 (age 73) Daviess County, Kentucky, U.S.
- Party: Democratic
- Spouse: Heather French (m. 2000)
- Children: 2
- Profession: Physician

Stephen L. Henry (born October 8, 1953) is an American politician and orthopedic surgeon who was the 52nd lieutenant governor of Kentucky from 1995 through 2003. He twice ran unsuccessfully in statewide elections, finishing third in Democratic primaries for the United States Senate in 1998 and for Governor of Kentucky in 2007.

== Early years ==
Henry was born October 8, 1953, in Daviess County, Kentucky, and graduated from Owensboro Senior High School in 1972, when he was a starter on the Red Devil's Kentucky Boys Basketball State Championship team led by Sweet Sixteen Tournament MVP, Jerry Thruston. He attended Western Kentucky University and was elected Student Body President in this second attempt, after losing a close election the preceding year to Jeff Costello. As President of the Student Government Association and as a Kentucky resident, Henry also served as a voting member of the WKU Board of Regents. Henry was a member of the Sigma Alpha Epsilon fraternity, which also included as its members during that time, future Western Kentucky University President Gary Ransdell and future Kentucky Supreme Court Chief Justice John D. Minton Jr. Henry attended the University of Louisville School of Medicine and became an orthopedic surgeon in Louisville, Kentucky. While in Louisville he was elected to the Jefferson County, Kentucky Fiscal Court as a Democratic County Commissioner.

== Medical career ==
As an orthopedic surgeon, Henry won international acclaim. He played an instrumental role in the research, development, and use of breakthrough techniques using antibiotic beads. Henry and his innovative techniques received international recognition on CNN during the Persian Gulf War, when the beads were used to treat wounded soldiers. His work was widely reported by several other national new organizations and won him personal recognition from General Norman Schwarzkopf.

== Lieutenant governor ==
In 1995, Paul E. Patton, then Lieutenant Governor of Kentucky, selected Henry as his running mate for Patton's campaign for governor. Due to a 1992 amendment to the Kentucky Constitution, 1995 was the first year in which candidates for Governor and Lieutenant Governor ran together as a slate in Kentucky. Patton and Henry won the election with 500,605 votes (50.9%) to 479,227 (48.7%) for the Republican nominees, Larry Forgy and Tom Handy. During the 1995 campaign, due to complaints that Henry ran up charges for telephone calls related to his campaign that were made out of his county office, Henry repaid the county for those calls.

In 1998, Henry ran for the United States Senate seat being vacated by Wendell H. Ford. Henry finished third in the Democratic primary with 156,576 votes (27.6%) to 166,472 votes (29.3%) for former federal prosecutor Charlie Owen and 194,125 votes (34.2%) for eventual nominee Congressman Scotty Baesler. Baesler narrowly lost the general election to Republican Jim Bunning.

In 1999, there was considerable speculation that Patton would drop Henry from the ticket, and Patton considered dropping Henry, but the two ran again and won re-election with 352,099 votes, 60.6% of the total in a very low turnout, defeating the Republican ticket of Peppy Martin and Wanda Cornelius.

While serving as lieutenant governor, Henry married 2000 Miss America Heather French Henry. The wedding led to controversy over state resources being expended as part of the wedding and planning (see below).

In 2002 Henry advocated legislation that would mandate healthier lunch options for Kentucky school children and limit junk food in public schools.

Henry served as lieutenant governor until late 2003, when Steve Pence was elected on the Republican ticket and succeeded Henry.

== Controversy ==
In 2002 and 2003 it emerged that the United States Attorney for the Western District of Kentucky was investigating Henry for fraudulent Medicare and Medicaid billings while he taught at the University of Louisville Medical School from 1996 through 2001. Then U.S. Attorney Steve Pence (R) had previously stated that he would not seek an indictment in regards to a criminal case.

The federal government pursued a civil case to attempt repayment. Henry counter sued claiming that the University of Louisville employees had verified his presence at the procedures before he had signed the papers. In 2003, Henry settled the federal lawsuit by paying the federal government $162,000.

A 2006 editorial by the state's largest newspaper, The Courier-Journal of Louisville, questioned Henry's past record of billing errors. In 2000 and 2001 Steve Henry repaid the state for numerous improper charges. He blamed a Kentucky State Police trooper for his hotel stay during a beauty pageant in Atlantic City, New Jersey, being charged to a state credit card. Henry was a delegate to the Democratic National Convention in 2000; Henry ended up repaying $4,327 to the state for personal expenses of his that were charged to the state for him and his wife.

Later, he repaid the state $491 for personal telephone calls he made from his state office. Henry also repaid the state $1,804 for almost 1,000 photos and video tapes made of him over a nine-month period, including his wedding, that were made by state employees. He also repaid the state $1,800 for press packets for his wedding that were made by state employees at taxpayer expense. Henry also charged a four night stay during two beauty pageants in a Lexington, Kentucky, hotel – just 30 miles from the lieutenant governor's mansion – to the state.

Henry also repaid the state $1,800 for services related to his wedding rendered to him by state employees.

In September 2003, Henry paid the federal government $162,000 to settle allegations that he defrauded Medicare and Medicaid over a period of more than four years while he was a teaching physician at University Hospital.

Subsequent to that case, Henry continued to claim that he had made a pledge to donate $100,000 to his alma mater, Western Kentucky University, without explaining that he had withdrawn the pledge and had paid less than $5,900 toward the $100,000 he had pledged.

== Campaign finance problems ==
On March 16, 2007, Leslie Holland, a former employee of Henry, filed a complaint with the Kentucky Registry of Election Finance stating that Henry broke state laws when he used a federal campaign account to spend money on his race for the state office of governor and used illegal corporate contributions for that purpose. This came shortly after the Office of the United States Attorney for the Western District of Kentucky acknowledged having received information pertaining to violations of federal campaign finance laws by Henry and his campaign entities.

In May 2009, a state audit, commissioned by a special state prosecutor, revealed that there were campaign finance violations during his 2007 run for governor. Henry claimed in an interview that the problems listed in the audit consisted of only a small portion of the campaign's finances.

In June 2007, it was reported that Henry was dismissed from the University of Louisville hospital faculty because of concerns about his attendance and performance and related liability problems. This came after his campaign for governor falsely claimed, among other things, that Henry still performed surgery at the hospital. Henry had claimed that he was donating his salary from the university, but the university stated that Henry had not been paid a salary since 1996.

In September 2009, Henry settled charges related to campaign finance law violations, agreeing to a $10,000 fine and assuming personal responsibility for approximately $600,000 in loans he made during his campaign for governor.

Henry was scheduled to enter guilty pleas on December 21, 2009, to criminal charges related to campaign finance law violations. Henry's plea agreement calls for him to be fined $500 and sentenced to 12 months in jail, to be conditionally discharged for two years if he engages in no further criminal conduct in that time.

== 2007 candidacy for governor ==
Henry ran as a candidate in the Democratic Primary for the 2007 election for Governor of Kentucky. He raised almost $1.5 million for the campaign, but approximately $700,000 of that was a loan (which was never repaid) from Henry to his own campaign. Early polls showed him at or near the head of the pack in the Democratic primary due to name recognition. However, Henry finished third in the primary with just over 60,000 votes (17%), behind Bruce Lunsford's 21% and winner Steve Beshear's 41% (over 142,000 votes) On election night Henry conceded and pledged his support to Beshear for the general election.

Political offices
Preceded by Paul E. Patton	Lieutenant Governor of Kentucky; 1995–2003	Succeeded by Steve Pence
Party political offices
Preceded by Paul E. Patton	Democratic nominee for Lieutenant Governor of Kentucky; 1995, 1999	Succeeded by Charlie Owen
