= 1999 Houston mayoral election =

- November 2, 1999
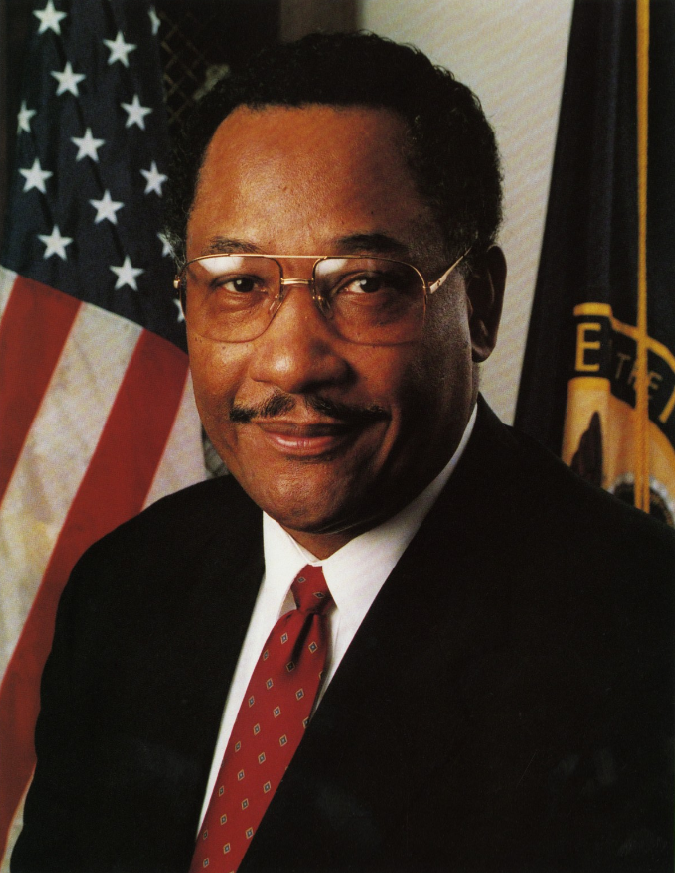

Nominee	Lee Brown	Jack Terence	Outlaw Wales
Popular vote	139,150	47,887	19,741
Percentage	67%	23%	10%
Mayor before election
Lee Brown
Elected mayor
Lee Brown

The 1999 Houston mayoral election took place on November 2, 1999. Incumbent Mayor Lee Brown was re-elected to a second term. The election was officially non-partisan.

== Candidates ==
- Incumbent Mayor Lee Brown
- Jack Terence
- Outlaw Josey Wales IV

== Results ==
Houston mayoral election, 1999
Candidate	Votes	%
Lee Brown (incumbent)	139,150	67%
Jack Terence	47,887	23%
Outlaw Josey Wales IV	19,741	10%

== See also ==
- Elections in Texas
