= 2003 Kentucky gubernatorial election =

- November 4, 2003
- Turnout: 40.2% (▲16.6%)
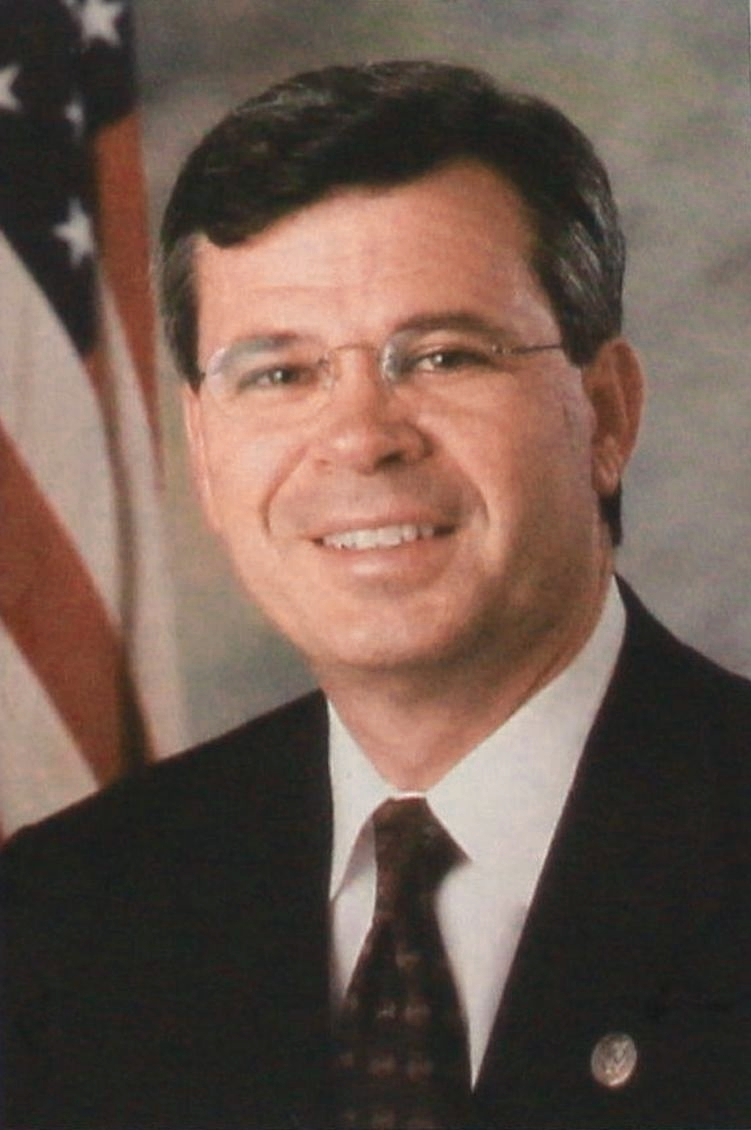

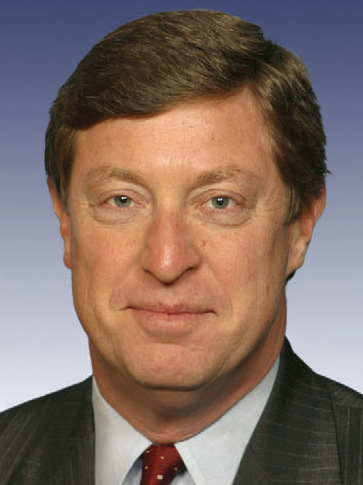
Nominee	Ernie Fletcher	Ben Chandler
Party	Republican	Democratic
Running mate	Steve Pence	Charlie Owen
Popular vote	596,284	487,159
Percentage	55.04%	44.96%
- Fletcher: 50–60% 60–70% 70–80% 80–90% Chandler: 50–60% 60–70% 70–80%
Governor before election
Paul E. Patton
Democratic
Elected Governor
Ernie Fletcher
Republican

The 2003 Kentucky gubernatorial election was held to elect the Governor of Kentucky on November 4, 2003. Republican candidate Ernie Fletcher defeated Democrat Ben Chandler and became the first Republican governor of Kentucky in 36 years. Chandler was later elected to Congress in a 2004 special election in Kentucky's 6th congressional district and held that seat until January 2013.

== Democratic primary ==
=== Candidates ===
==== Declared ====
- Ben Chandler - Kentucky Attorney General, 1995–present; former Kentucky Auditor of Public Accounts, 1991–1995.
  - Running mate: Charlie Owen, Louisville entrepreneur; former head of the Kentucky Crime Commission, 1969–1973; candidate in 1998 U.S. Senate race in Kentucky who received 29% of the vote in the primary.
- Jody Richards – State Representative, 1975–2019 (Speaker of the House, 1996–2009).
  - Running mate: Tony Miller, Jefferson County Circuit Court Clerk, 1988–2006.
- Otis Hensley – Private contractor from Wallins Creek, Kentucky.
  - Running mate: Richard Robbins

==== Withdrawn ====
- Bruce Lunsford – Louisville businessman; former Kentucky Secretary of Commerce, 1981–1983
  - Running mate: Barbara Edelman, litigation lawyer; former Assistant Kentucky Attorney General, 1977–1979; former Assistant U.S. Attorney for Eastern District of Kentucky

=== Campaign ===
Incumbent Democratic Governor Paul E. Patton was term limited from seeking a third term of office and was facing investigations after admitting to an affair. This led to the other Democratic candidates distancing themselves from him. State Attorney General Ben Chandler won the primary narrowly defeating the Speaker of the Kentucky House of Representatives Jody Richards, whose running mate was Tony Miller. He had led in the polls for several months before the primary.

Earlier businessman Bruce Lunsford had dropped out of the primary after Chandler launched adverts talking of abuse at nursing homes run by Lunsford's company. Lunsford had spent 8 million dollars of his own money during the primary campaign and after his withdrawal backed Richards against Chandler and said he would vote against Chandler in the general election if he won the primary.

=== Results ===
Primary results by county: Chandler: Chandler—81-90%; Chandler—71-80%; Chandler—61-70%; Chandler—51-60%; Chandler—41-50%; Richards: Richards—81-90%; Richards—71-80%; Richards—61-70%; Richards—51-60%; Richards—41-50%

Democratic primary results
Party	Candidate	Votes	%
Democratic	Ben Chandler; Charlie Owen	143,150	50.20%
Democratic	Jody Richards; Tony Miller	132,627	46.51%
Democratic	Otis Hensley Jr.; Richard Robbins	9,372	3.29%
Total votes		285,149	100.00%

== Republican primary ==
=== Candidates ===
==== Declared ====
- Ernie Fletcher - U.S. Representative for Kentucky's 6th congressional district, 1999–2003; former State Representative, 1995–1997.
  - Running mate: Steve Pence, former U.S. Attorney for Western District of Kentucky, 2001–2003; previously former Assistant U.S. Attorney for Western District of Kentucky, 1990–1995
  - Former running mate: G. Hunter Bates, former Chief of Staff to Mitch McConnell, 2000–2002, McConnell's campaign manager in 2002 Senate race; removed from ballot after primary due to not meeting constitutional residency requirements
- Rebecca Jackson - former Jefferson County Judge/Executive, 1998–2002
  - Running mate: Robbie Rudolph, Murray businessman; founder and owner of Rudolph Tire Inc. (later served on Fletcher's transition team, appointed Secretary of Finance, later State Secretary of Executive Cabinet in 2006, and eventually became Fletcher's running mate in 2007)
- Steve Nunn - son of former governor Louie B. Nunn; State Representative, 1990–2007
  - Running mate:Bob Heleringer, former State Representative, 1980–2002
- Virgil Moore - State Senator, 1992–2005
  - Running mate: Don Bell, retired United States Secret Service agent

=== Campaign ===
Physician and former Air Force pilot Ernie Fletcher won the Republican primary easily. Earlier Fletcher had to replace his running mate for lieutenant governor, Hunter Bates, as he did not meet the residency requirements. Fletcher was backed by U.S. Senator Mitch McConnell and led in most polls before the primary.

=== Results ===
Primary results by county: Fletcher: Flethcer—40–50%; Flethcer—60–70%; Flethcer—70–80%; Fletcher—80–90%; Fletcher—>90%; Jackson: Jackson—30–40%; Jackson—40–50%; Jackson—50–60%; Jackson—>60%; Nunn: Nunn—40–50%; Nunn—50–60%; Nunn—>60%

Republican primary results
Party	Candidate	Votes	%
Republican	Ernie Fletcher; Steve Pence (Note: Fletcher's running mate printed on the ballot was Hunter Bates, but a notice to voters at the polls indicated that Bates had been replaced by Pence.)	90,912	57.31%
Republican	Rebecca Jackson; Robbie Rudolph	44,084	27.79%
Republican	Steve Nunn; Bob Heleringer	21,267	13.41%
Republican	Virgil Moore; Don Bell	2,365	1.49%
Total votes		158,628	100.00%

== General election ==
=== Campaign ===
Fletcher tried to link Chandler with the scandals that incumbent governor Patton's administration had been racked with. However Chandler attempted to distance himself from the governor, calling for him to resign and describing himself as a maverick.

Chandler meanwhile attacked President George Bush for his handling of the economy and linked Fletcher with his policies. Nevertheless, Fletcher was assisted late in the campaign by President Bush, who made five visits to Kentucky to support him. Fletcher led in the polls throughout the campaign and towards the end pulled out a lead of 7 to 9 percent over Chandler.

Just before the election the American Civil Liberties Union (ACLU) filed lawsuits for some residents of largely Democratic districts in West Louisville to try to get an injunction to stop Republicans from putting challengers in their precincts. Kentucky law allowed challengers to be stationed in precincts to question whether voters were eligible but the ACLU claimed they were targeting black voters and could intimidate people. However a judge refused to issue the injunction and allowed the challengers to go ahead.

Exit polls showed that Fletcher got a quarter of Democrats to support him as well as a majority of independents. Male voters backed Fletcher over Chandler by 59% to 41%, while women split almost equally. They also showed that 18% of voters used their votes to express opposition to the incumbent governor Paul Patton.

=== Polling ===
Poll source	Date(s) administered	Sample size (Note: Key: A – all adults RV – registered voters LV – likely voters V – unclear)	Margin of error	Ernie Fletcher (R)	Ben Chandler (D)	Other / Undecided
SurveyUSA	October 30 – November 1, 2003	755 (LV)	± 3.6%	52%	44%	4%

=== Predictions ===
Source	Ranking	As of
Sabato	Lean R (flip)	September 2, 2003

=== Results ===
2003 Kentucky gubernatorial election
Party	Candidate	Votes	%	±%
Republican	Ernie Fletcher; Stephen B. Pence	596,284	55.04	+32.83
Democratic	A. B. "Ben" Chandler; Charlie Owen	487,159	44.96	−15.74
Total votes		1,083,443	100.0	N/A
Turnout		1,088,192	40.22	+16.64
Registered electors		2,705,453		
Republican gain from Democratic				

==== Counties that flipped from Democratic to Republican ====
- Adair (Largest city: Columbia)
- Allen (Largest city: Scottsville)
- Anderson (Largest city: Lawrenceburg)
- Barren (Largest city: Glasgow)
- Bell (Largest city: Middlesboro)
- Boone (Largest city: Florence)
- Bourbon (Largest city: Paris)
- Boyle (Largest city: Danville)
- Bracken (Largest city: Augusta)
- Breckinridge (Largest city: Hardinsburg)
- Bullitt (Largest city: Mount Washington)
- Butler (Largest city: Morgantown)
- Caldwell (Largest city: Princeton)
- Calloway (Largest city: Murray)
- Campbell (Largest city: Fort Thomas)
- Carlisle (Largest city: Bardwell)
- Casey (Largest city: Liberty)
- Christian (Largest city: Hopkinsville)
- Clark (Largest city: Winchester)
- Clinton (Largest city: Albany)
- Crittenden (Largest city: Marion)
- Cumberland (Largest city: Burkesville)
- Daviess (Largest city: Owensboro)
- Edmonson (Largest city: Brownsville)
- Estill (Largest city: Irvine)
- Fayette (Largest city: Lexington)
- Fleming (Largest city: Flemingsburg)
- Gallatin (Largest city: Warsaw)
- Garrard (Largest city: Lancaster)
- Grant (Largest city: Williamstown)
- Graves (Largest city: Mayfield)
- Grayson (Largest city: Leitchfield)
- Green (Largest city: Greensburg)
- Hardin (Largest city: Elizabethtown)
- Harrison (Largest city: Cynthiana)
- Hart (Largest city: Horse Cave)
- Henry (Largest city: Eminence)
- Hickman (Largest city: Clinton)
- Hopkins (Largest city: Madisonville)
- Jessamine (Largest city: Nicholasville)
- Johnson (Largest city: Paintsville)
- Kenton (Largest city: Covington)
- Knox (Largest city: Barbourville)
- LaRue (Largest city: Hodgenville)
- Laurel (Largest city: London)
- Lee (Largest city: Beattyville)
- Lewis (Largest city: Vanceburg)
- Lincoln (Largest city: Stanford)
- Logan (Largest city: Russellville)
- Madison (Largest city: Richmond)
- Marshall (Largest city: Benton)
- Mason (Largest city: Maysville)
- McCracken (Largest city: Paducah)
- McCreary (Largest city: Pine Knot)
- Meade (Largest city: Brandenburg)
- Mercer (Largest city: Harrodsburg)
- Metcalfe (Largest city: Edmonton)
- Monroe (Largest city: Tompkinsville)
- Montgomery (Largest city: Mount Sterling)
- Nelson (Largest city: Bardstown)
- Nicholas (Largest city: Carlisle)
- Ohio (Largest city: Beaver Dam)
- Oldham (Largest city: La Grange)
- Owen (Largest city: Owenton)
- Owsley (Largest city: Booneville)
- Pendleton (Largest city: Falmouth)
- Powell (Largest city: Stanton)
- Pulaski (Largest city: Somerset)
- Robertson (Largest municipality: Mount Olivet)
- Rockcastle (Largest city: Mount Vernon)
- Russell (Largest city: Russell Springs)
- Scott (Largest city: Georgetown)
- Shelby (Largest city: Shelbyville)
- Simpson (Largest city: Franklin)
- Spencer (Largest city: Taylorsville)
- Taylor (Largest city: Campbellsville)
- Todd (Largest city: Elkton)
- Trigg (Largest city: Cadiz)
- Warren (Largest city: Bowling Green)
- Washington (Largest city: Springfield)
- Wayne (Largest city: Monticello)
- Whitley (Largest city: Corbin)

==== Counties that flipped from Republican to Democratic ====
- Harlan (Largest city: Cumberland)
- Letcher (Largest city: Jenkins)
- Perry (Largest city: Hazard)
