= 2007 Kentucky gubernatorial election =

- November 6, 2007
- Turnout: 37.9% (▼2.3%)
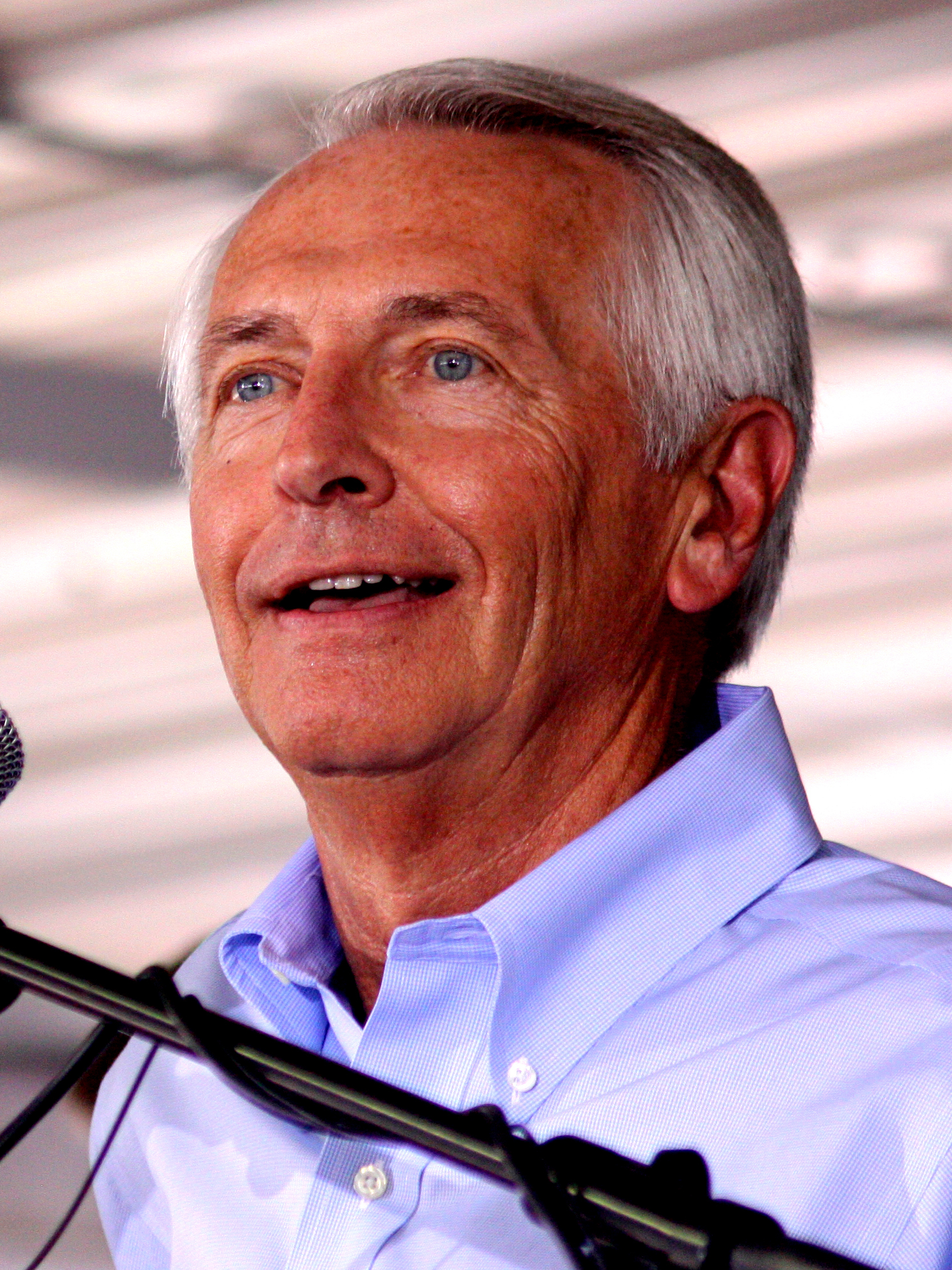

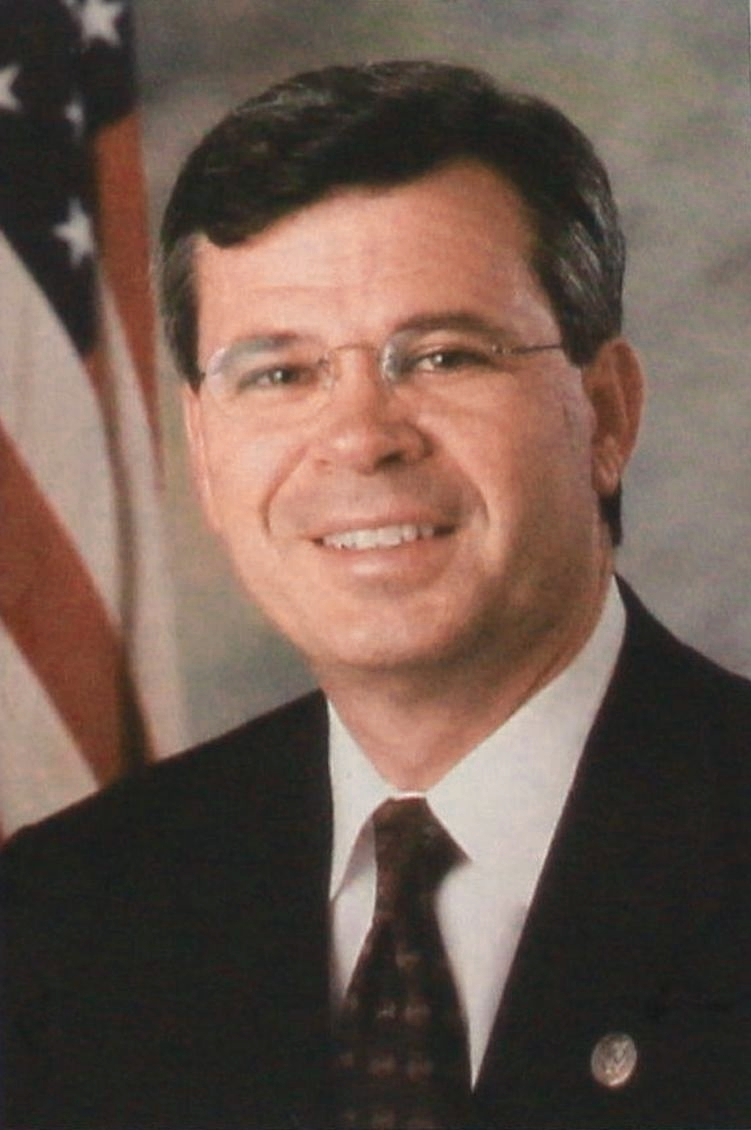
Nominee	Steve Beshear	Ernie Fletcher
Party	Democratic	Republican
Running mate	Daniel Mongiardo	Robbie Rudolph
Popular vote	619,552	435,773
Percentage	58.71%	41.29%
- Beshear: 50–60% 60–70% 70–80% 80–90% Fletcher: 50–60% 60–70% 70–80%
Governor before election
Ernie Fletcher
Republican
Elected Governor
Steve Beshear
Democratic

The 2007 Kentucky gubernatorial election was held on November 6, 2007. In this election, incumbent Republican governor Ernie Fletcher ran for reelection to a second term but was soundly defeated by Democratic challenger Steve Beshear. A primary election to determine the Republican and Democratic nominees for governor was held on May 22, 2007, in which Fletcher and Beshear won their respective primaries.

== Background ==
Fletcher came under increasing criticism from both parties after his involvement in a state employee hiring controversy, in which he was accused of illegally hiring merit system (civil service) employees for their political affiliations and loyalties. An investigation by Greg Stumbo, the attorney general of Kentucky, and a special grand jury led to the indictment of 13 Fletcher administration officials. Fletcher issued a blanket pardon for anyone in his administration (other than himself) who was or may have been involved in the scandal. Fletcher himself was later indicted by a grand jury for three misdemeanors: conspiracy, official misconduct and political discrimination. All were related to the merit-system investigation. On August 24, 2006, Fletcher reached a deal with Stumbo that led to the dismissal of the charges in exchange for Fletcher's acknowledgment that "the evidence strongly indicates wrongdoing by his administration with regard to personnel actions within the merit system. Further, the governor hereby states that these actions were inappropriate and that he regrets their occurrence and accepts responsibility for them as head of the executive branch of state government." (See Ernie Fletcher: Merit system investigation.) Fletcher's approval rating as of May 11, 2007 was at 38%, putting him among the lowest governors in the nation.

Former U.S. Rep. Anne Northup, who had lost reelection in 2006, and Paducah businessman Billy Harper challenged Fletcher in the Republican primary. Both had supported and worked for Fletcher's 2003 campaign. Despite his troubles, Fletcher was able to fend off the primary challenge, winning just over a majority of the vote (see below).

On the Democratic side, an increasingly competitive primary campaign developed. Louisville businessman Bruce Lunsford spent over five million dollars, most of it being his own money, in the campaign, and picked Stumbo as his running mate for lieutenant governor. On May 7, Kentucky State Treasurer Jonathan Miller withdrew from the race and endorsed former Lt. Gov. Steve Beshear. Lunsford, Beshear, state House Speaker Jody Richards, and former Lt. Gov. Steve Henry consistently polled significantly ahead of the other candidates. Given the crowded field, many believed a runoff election was likely between the top two finishers — which polls suggested would be Beshear and Lunsford — if no candidate was able to obtain at least 40% of the vote. Beshear, however, was able to avoid a runoff with 41% (see below).

== Republican primary ==
=== Candidates ===
- Ernie Fletcher – incumbent governor of Kentucky, 2003–2007; former U.S. representative for Kentucky's 6th congressional district, 1999–2003; former state representative, 1995–1997
  - Running mate: Robbie Rudolph, state secretary of Executive Cabinet, 2006–2007; state secretary of finance, 2003–2006
- Billy Harper – businessman
  - Running mate: Dick Wilson
- Anne Northup – former U.S. representative for Kentucky's 3rd congressional district, 1997–2007; former state representative, 1987–1997
  - Running mate: Jeff Hoover, state representative 1997–2019

=== Polling ===
Source	Date	Ernie Fletcher	Billy Harper	Anne Northup
Survey USA	May 18–20, 2007	44%	17%	34%
Courier-Journal Bluegrass Poll	May 10–15, 2007	41%	10%	26%
Survey USA	May 12–14, 2007	44%	14%	34%
Survey USA	April 28–30, 2007	46%	14%	34%
Survey USA	March 31 – April 2, 2007	40%	16%	31%
Survey USA	March 3–5, 2007	33%	13%	31%
Public Opinion Strategies	January 28–29, 2007	39%	10%	39%

=== Results ===
Primary results by county: Fletcher: 40–50%; 50–60%; 60–70%; 70–80%; 80–90%; Northup: 40–50%; 50–60%; 60–70%; 70–80%; Harper: 50–60%

Republican primary results
Party	Candidate	Votes	%
Republican	Ernie Fletcher (incumbent); Robbie Rudolph	101,328	50.08%
Republican	Anne Northup; Jeff Hoover	73,919	36.53%
Republican	Billy Harper; Dick Wilson	27,092	13.39%
Total votes		202,339	100.00%

== Democratic primary ==
=== Candidates ===
- Steve Beshear – former lt. governor of Kentucky, 1983–1987; former attorney general of Kentucky, 1979–1983; former state representative, 1974–1979
  - Running mate: State Senator Daniel Mongiardo, 2001–2007
- Gatewood Galbraith – attorney, perennial candidate
  - Running mate: Mark Wireman
- Steve Henry – former lt. governor of Kentucky, 1995–2003
  - Running mate: Fayette County Property Valuation Administrator Renee True, 1992–2009
- Otis Hensley – private contractor from Wallins Creek, Kentucky, who received 3% of the vote in the Democratic primary in 2003
  - Running mate: Richard Robbins
- Bruce Lunsford – Louisville businessman; sought the Democratic nomination for governor in 2003; withdrew four days before the primary, endorsing Jody Richards
  - Running mate: Greg Stumbo, attorney general of Kentucky 2004–2007; former state representative, 1985–2003
- Jody Richards – state representative, 1975–2019 (speaker of the House, 1996–2007); received 47% of the vote in the Democratic primary for governor of Kentucky in 2003
  - Running mate: John Y. Brown III, Kentucky secretary of state 1995–2003

=== Polling ===
Source	Date	Steve Beshear	Gatewood Galbraith	Steve Henry	Otis Hensley	Bruce Lunsford	Jody Richards	Jonathan Miller
Survey USA	May 18–20, 2007	32%	7%	17%	1%	23%	12%	N/A
Penn, Schoen and Berland	May 16–17, 2007	26%	N/A	13%	N/A	22%	12%	N/A
GarinHartYang Research	May 14–15, 2007	35%	N/A	13%	N/A	23%	12%	N/A
Survey USA	May 12–14, 2007	32%	5%	18%	1%	23%	12%	N/A
Courier-Journal Bluegrass Poll	May 10–14, 2007	27%	4%	13%	1%	21%	7%	N/A
Survey USA	April 28–30, 2007	23%	6%	18%	1%	29%	9%	7%
Mellman Group	April 19–22, 2007	15%	N/A	24%	N/A	16%	9%	20%
Survey USA	March 31 – April 2, 2007	15%	8%	20%	1%	20%	12%	8%
Survey USA	March 3–5, 2007	15%	6%	26%	2%	7%	13%	8%
GarinHartYang Research	February 20–22, 2007	21%	N/A	21%	N/A	8%	16%	8%

=== Results ===
Primary results by county: Beshear: Beshear—80–90%; Beshear—70–80%; Beshear—60–70%; Beshear—50–60%; Beshear—40–50%; Beshear—30–40%; Beshear—20–30%; Lunsford: Lunsford—60–70%; Lunsford—50–60%; Lunsford—40–50%; Lunsford—30–40%; Henry: Henry—50–60%; Henry—40–50%; Henry—30–40%; Richards: Richards—60–70%; Richards—50–60%; Richards—40–50%; Richards—30–40%; Richards—20–30%; Galbraith: Galbraith—30–40%

Democratic primary results
Party	Candidate	Votes	%
Democratic	Steve Beshear; Daniel Mongiardo	142,838	41.02%
Democratic	Bruce Lunsford; Greg Stumbo	74,578	21.42%
Democratic	Steve Henry; Renee True	60,893	17.49%
Democratic	Jody Richards; John Y. Brown III	45,433	13.05%
Democratic	Gatewood Galbraith; Mark Wireman	20,704	5.95%
Democratic	Otis Hensley; Richard Robbins	3,792	1.09%
Total votes		348,238	100.00%

== General election ==
=== Polling ===
Source	Date	Steve Beshear (D)	Ernie Fletcher (R)
Survey USA	November 2–4, 2007	59%	39%
Rasmussen Reports	November 1, 2007	54%	39%
Survey USA	October 27–29, 2007	60%	36%
Courier-Journal Bluegrass Poll	October 26–29, 2007	56%	33%
Research 2000	October 22–24, 2007	55%	40%
Survey USA	October 19–21, 2007	58%	38%
Survey USA	October 8–9, 2007	56%	40%
Insider Advantage	September 24–25, 2007	45%	35%
Courier-Journal Bluegrass Poll	September 13–18, 2007	55%	35%
Preston-Osborne	September 13–17, 2007	51%	36%
Research 2000	September 10–13, 2007	56%	39%
Survey USA	September 8–10, 2007	58%	39%
Survey USA	August 4–6, 2007	58%	37%
Preston-Osborne	July 25 – August 2, 2007	49%	31%
Survey USA	July 14–16, 2007	59%	36%
Insider Advantage	July 8–9, 2007	41%	38%
Rasmussen Reports	May 24–25, 2007	51%	35%
Survey USA	May 23–24, 2007	62%	34%

=== Predictions ===
Source	Ranking	As of
Sabato's Crystal Ball	Likely D (flip)	November 1, 2007

=== Results ===
2007 Kentucky gubernatorial election
Party	Candidate	Votes	%	±%
Democratic	Steven L. Beshear; Daniel Mongiardo	619,552	58.71	+13.74
Republican	Ernie Fletcher (incumbent); Robbie Rudolph	435,773	41.29	−13.74
Total votes		1,055,325	100.0	N/A
Turnout		1,076,442	37.89	−2.33
Registered electors		2,840,898		
Democratic gain from Republican				

==== Counties that flipped from Republican to Democratic ====
- Anderson (largest city: Lawrenceburg)
- Barren (largest city: Glasgow)
- Bell (largest city: Middlesboro)
- Bourbon (largest city: Paris)
- Boyle (largest city: Danville)
- Bracken (largest city: Augusta)
- Breckinridge (largest city: Hardinsburg)
- Bullitt (largest city: Mount Washington)
- Caldwell (largest city: Princeton)
- Calloway (largest city: Murray)
- Campbell (largest city: Fort Thomas)
- Carlisle (largest city: Bardwell)
- Christian (largest city: Hopkinsville)
- Clark (largest city: Winchester)
- Crittenden (largest city: Marion)
- Daviess (largest city: Owensboro)
- Edmonson (largest city: Brownsville)
- Fayette (largest city: Lexington)
- Fleming (largest city: Flemingsburg)
- Gallatin (largest city: Warsaw)
- Grant (largest city: Williamstown)
- Graves (largest city: Mayfield)
- Hardin (largest city: Elizabethtown)
- Harrison (largest city: Cynthiana)
- Hart (largest city: Horse Cave)
- Henry (largest city: Eminence)
- Hickman (largest city: Clinton)
- Hopkins (largest city: Madisonville)
- Johnson (largest city: Paintsville)
- Kenton (largest city: Covington)
- LaRue (largest city: Hodgenville)
- Leslie (largest city: Hyden)
- Logan (largest city: Russellville)
- Madison (largest city: Richmond)
- Marshall (largest city: Benton)
- Martin (largest city: Inez)
- Mason (largest city: Maysville)
- McCracken (largest city: Paducah)
- Meade (largest city: Brandenburg)
- Mercer (largest city: Harrodsburg)
- Metcalfe (largest city: Edmonton)
- Montgomery (largest city: Mount Sterling)
- Nelson (largest city: Bardstown)
- Nicholas (largest city: Carlisle)
- Ohio (largest city: Hartford)
- Owen (largest city: Owenton)
- Owsley (largest city: Booneville)
- Pendleton (largest city: Falmouth)
- Powell (largest city: Stanton)
- Robertson (largest municipality: Mount Olivet)
- Scott (largest city: Georgetown)
- Shelby (largest city: Shelbyville)
- Simpson (largest city: Franklin)
- Spencer (largest city: Taylorsville)
- Todd (largest city: Elkton)
- Trigg (largest city: Cadiz)
- Warren (largest city: Bowling Green)
- Washington (largest city: Springfield)

== See also ==
- 2007 United States elections
- 2007 United States gubernatorial elections
- Governors of Kentucky
