= 1995 Louisiana gubernatorial election =

- October 21, 1995 (first round); November 18, 1995 (runoff)
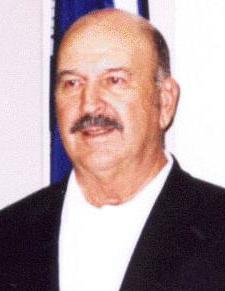

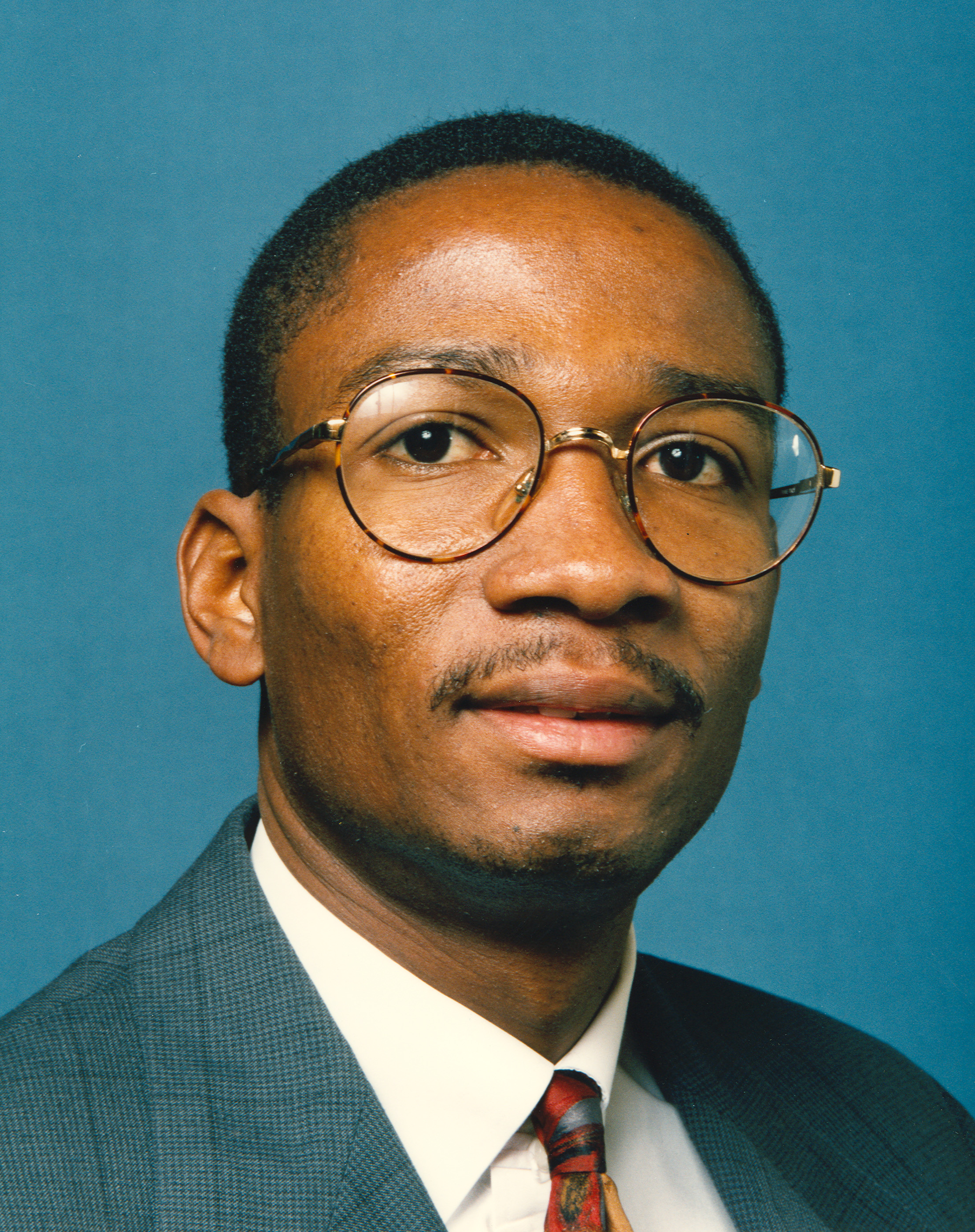

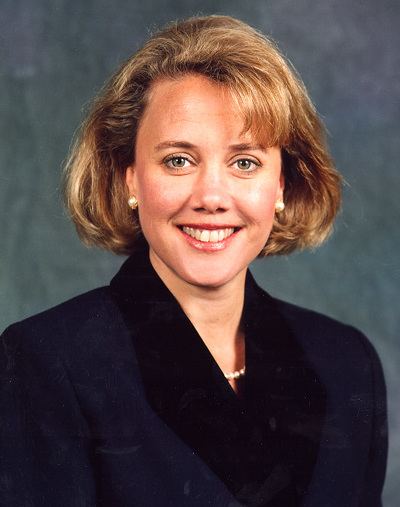

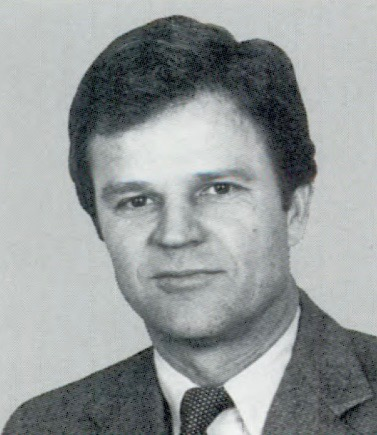

Candidate	Mike Foster	Cleo Fields	Mary Landrieu
Party	Republican	Democratic	Democratic
First round	385,267; 26.14%	280,921; 19.06%	271,938; 18.45%
Runoff	984,499; 63.50%	565,861; 36.50%	Eliminated
Candidate	Buddy Roemer	Phil Preis
Party	Republican	Democratic
First round	263,330; 17.87%	133,271; 9.04%
Runoff	Eliminated	Eliminated
- Foster: 20–30% 30–40% 40–50% 50–60% 60–70% 70–80% 80–90% Fields: 20–30% 30–40% 40–50% 50–60% 70–80% Landrieu: 20–30% 30–40% Roemer: 20–30% 30–40% Preis: 20–30% 30–40%
Governor before election
Edwin Edwards
Democratic
Elected Governor
Mike Foster
Republican

The 1995 Louisiana gubernatorial election was held on November 18, 1995, to elect the governor of Louisiana.

Incumbent Democratic governor Edwin Edwards had planned to run for re-election to a second consecutive and fifth overall term in office, but he announced in June 1994, shortly after marrying his second wife Candy Picou, that he would be retiring from politics at the end of his term.

All elections in Louisiana— with the exception of U.S. presidential elections— follow a variation of the open primary system called the jungle primary. Candidates of any and all parties are listed on one ballot; voters need not limit themselves to the candidates of one party when voting. Unless one candidate takes more than 50% of the vote in the first round, a run-off election is then held between the top two candidates, who may in fact be members of the same party.

In this election, the first round of voting was held on October 21, 1995, with Republican state senator Mike Foster and Democratic U.S. representative Cleo Fields finishing first and second with 26.1% and 19%, respectively. Foster defeated Fields in the November 18 runoff in a landslide. As of 2023, this is the most recent Louisiana gubernatorial election in which a successful Republican candidate was not elected in the first round.

== Candidates ==
The early field included eight individuals considered to be "major" candidates. These were State Representative Robert Adley, U.S. representative Cleo Fields, State Senator Mike Foster, U.S. representative William J. Jefferson, State Treasurer Mary Landrieu, former governor Buddy Roemer, Lieutenant Governor Melinda Schwegmann and former governor Dave Treen.

On September 8, Foster decided to switch his party affiliation at the time of qualifying from Democratic to Republican, this decision may have been noted as a gamechanger towards the outcome of the jungle primary.

The makeup of the field led some analysts to dub this the "twins election", as each major candidate had a rival who appealed to a similar constituency or voter base. The sets of "twins" were: two mainstream Republican former governors (Treen and Roemer); two moderate Democratic female statewide office holders with ties to New Orleans (Landrieu and Schwegmann); two conservative Democratic state legislators (Foster and Adley); and two liberal, black Democratic U.S. representatives (Fields and Jefferson).

Treen and Jefferson eventually chose not to officially enter the race. Attorney Phil Preis also entered the race as a Democrat and with a self-financed campaign was able to enter the top tier of candidates. Eight minor candidates, two Democrats and six Independents, also qualified for the ballot.

=== Democratic Party ===
==== Declared ====
- Gene H. Alexander
- Belinda Alexandrenko
- Robert Adley, state representative
- Cleo Fields, U.S. representative
- Mary Landrieu, Louisiana State Treasurer
- Phil Preis, attorney
- Melinda Schwegmann, Lieutenant Governor of Louisiana

==== Withdrew ====
- Harry Lee, Sheriff of Jefferson Parish

==== Declined ====
- William J. Jefferson, U.S. representative

=== Republican Party ===
==== Declared ====
- Mike Foster, state senator from St. Mary Parish
- Buddy Roemer, former governor (1988-1992)

==== Declined ====
- Dave Treen, former governor

=== Independents ===
==== Declared ====
- Lonnie Creech
- Ronnie Glynn Johnson, candidate for Mayor of Shreveport in 1990 and candidate for Governor in 1991
- Arthur D. "Jim" Nichols
- Anne Thompson, Republican candidate for Governor in 1991, for Louisiana's 1st congressional district in 1992 and for the State Senate in 1994
- Darryl Paul Ward, Democratic nominee for Louisiana's 6th congressional district in 1994
- Kenneth Woods

== Results ==
Louisiana gubernatorial election jungle primary, 1995
Party	Candidate	Votes	%
Republican	Mike Foster	385,267	26.10
Democratic	Cleo Fields	280,921	19.03
Democratic	Mary Landrieu	271,938	18.43
Republican	Buddy Roemer	263,330	17.84
Democratic	Phil Preis	133,271	9.03
Democratic	Melinda Schwegmann	71,288	4.83
Democratic	Robert Adley	27,534	1.87
Independent	Arthur D. "Jim" Nichols	16,616	1.13
Democratic	Gene H. Alexander	5,688	0.39
Independent	Kenneth Woods	4,964	0.34
Independent	Darryl Paul Ward	4,210	0.29
Democratic	Belinda Alexandrenko	3,161	0.21
Independent	Lonnie Creech	2,338	0.16
Independent	Ronnie Glynn Johnson	1,884	0.13
Independent	Anne Thompson	1,416	0.1
Total votes		1,473,826	100

Louisiana gubernatorial election runoff, 1995
Party	Candidate	Votes	%
Republican	Mike Foster	984,499	63.5
Democratic	Cleo Fields	565,861	36.5
Total votes		1,550,360	100
Republican gain from Democratic			

== See also ==
- 1995 United States gubernatorial elections
