= Phil Preis =

American lawyer (born 1950)

Phillip Wesley Preis Sr.
- Born: April 18, 1950 (age 76); Newellton, Tensas Parish; Louisiana, U.S.
- Education: Newellton High School Louisiana State University Georgetown University
- Occupations: Attorney; Gubernatorial candidate, 1995 and 1999
- Political party: Democratic / later Republican
- Spouse: Terry Preis
- Children: Phillip Preis Jr. Caroline Preis Graham; Michael Preis Jennifer Preis
- Parent(s): Edwin Gustav Preis Sr., and Patricia M. Preis

Phillip Wesley Preis Sr., known as Phil Preis (born April 18, 1950), is an American attorney and former politician, based in Baton Rouge, Louisiana, who specializes in mergers and acquisitions. A native of Newellton in Tensas Parish in northeastern Louisiana, Preis is the son of Patricia M. Preis of Newellton and Edwin Gustav Preis Sr. (1916–2011), a former Newellton mayor, who was also from 1976 to 1977 the president of the Louisiana Municipal Association.

Preis graduated in 1968 from the defunct Newellton High School. In 1972, he obtained his Bachelor of Science in accounting from Louisiana State University in Baton Rouge. He procured his Juris Doctor degree in 1975 from Georgetown University in Washington, D.C. He is affiliated with Omicron Delta Kappa; Beta Gamma Sigma, and Phi Kappa Phi. His Baton Rouge law firm is Preis Gordon.

Preis ran unsuccessfully for governor as a Democrat in both 1995 and 1999. In the October 21, 1995 gubernatorial election, he finished fifth in a field of sixteen candidates with 9.03 percent of the vote. He received a plurality of the vote in his native Tensas Parish (36.91 percent) and in neighboring Franklin Parish (26.17 percent), which includes Winnsboro.

In the gubernatorial election of October 23, 1999, Preis ran fourth among eleven candidates, having polled 1.81 percent of the statewide vote. That race was decisively won by the incumbent Republican governor Murphy J. "Mike" Foster Jr.

Preis and his wife, Terry, have four children, Phillip Preis Jr., Caroline Preis Graham, Michael Preis, of Austin, Texas, and Jennifer Preis, of Dallas, Texas. Preis's brother, Edwin G. Preis Jr. (born 1947), is an attorney with the firm, Preis and Roy in Lafayette, Louisiana. His sister, Patricia Preis Thompson, is married to Dr. Tony Thompson, formerly of Newellton and now of Nacogdoches, Texas. Thompson's late father-in-law was the Tensas Parish School Superintendent Charles Ed Thompson.

In 2017, Preis is listed by the Louisiana Secretary of State's office as a Republican voter in East Baton Rouge Parish.
