= Mike Foster (American politician) =

American politician (1930–2020)

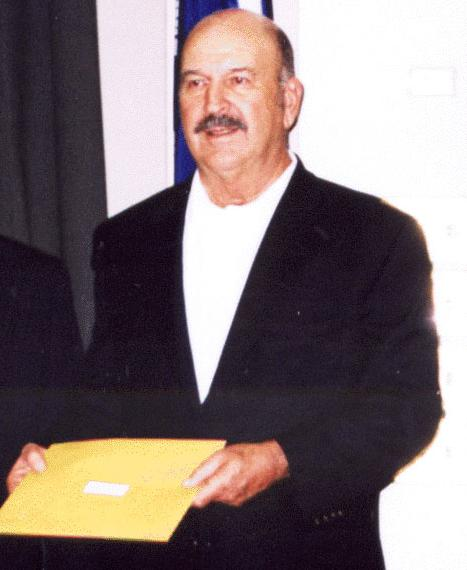

53rd Governor of Louisiana
- In office January 8, 1996 – January 12, 2004
- Lieutenant: Kathleen Blanco
- Preceded by: Edwin Edwards
- Succeeded by: Kathleen Blanco

Member of the Louisiana Senate from the 21st district
- In office January 1988 – January 1996
- Preceded by: Anthony Guarisco Jr.
- Succeeded by: John Siracusa

Personal details
- Born: Murphy James Foster Jr. July 11, 1930 Franklin, Louisiana, U.S.
- Died: October 4, 2020 (aged 90) Franklin, Louisiana, U.S.
- Party: Republican (from 1995)
- Other political affiliations: Democratic (before 1995)
- Spouse: Alice Cosner Foster
- Relations: Murphy J. Foster (grandfather)
- Children: Murphy J. Foster, III Ramelle Foster; Two stepsons: Paul and Troy West
- Education: Virginia Military Institute; Louisiana State University (BS); Southern University (JD)

Military service
- Allegiance: United States
- Branch/service: United States Air Force
- Years of service: 1952–1956
- Rank: Captain
- Unit: United States Air Force Reserve
- Battles/wars: Korean War

Murphy James "Mike" Foster Jr. (July 11, 1930 – October 4, 2020) was an American businessman and politician who served as the 53rd governor of Louisiana from 1996 to 2004.

== Early life and career ==
Murphy James Foster Jr. was born on 11 July 1930 in Franklin, the seat of government of St. Mary Parish. His father, also named Murphy James Foster, was an area sugar planter and owner of oil and natural gas lands, whose own father was Murphy J. Foster Sr., who was Louisiana governor from 1892 to 1900 and a U.S. Senator from 1901 to 1913.

Foster attended public high school in Franklin, graduated from Louisiana State University in Baton Rouge in 1952 with a Bachelor of Science in chemistry, and Southern University Law Center with a Juris Doctor in 2004, the year he left the governorship. He became an Eagle Scout in the Boy Scouts of America in 1946 and was a recipient of the Distinguished Eagle Scout Award. He was a member of Delta Kappa Epsilon fraternity (Zeta Zeta chapter) and The Friars. He joined the Air Force and served in the Korean War. By the time Mike Foster entered politics, he had already become a wealthy sugar planter and owner of a construction firm. He resided at Oaklawn Manor, an antebellum plantation mansion in Franklin.

== Election as governor, 1995 ==
Foster entered the 1995 gubernatorial race as a minor candidate whom most local political observers discounted. Then in September 1995, Foster announced he would qualify for the race as a Republican. The Republicans had not coalesced on a candidate, and Foster's announcement that he was switching parties vaulted him from single digits in the polls to serious contention. Foster rode a wave of popular dissatisfaction with the more unsavory aspects of the casino gambling that had been legalized under outgoing Governor Edwin W. Edwards. Foster came out strongly against gambling and pledged to run Louisiana "like a business." His conservative platform included attacks on welfare abuse, gun control, affirmative action, racial quotas, and political corruption.

He carried the endorsement of the columnist and former Republican presidential candidate Patrick J. Buchanan.

Foster edged out two more well-known candidates for a seat in the runoff with then-United States Representative Cleo Fields from Louisiana's 4th congressional district, a prominent black Democratic politician. Future U.S. Senator Mary Landrieu ran third and missed the general election berth by just 8,983 votes (0.6 percent of the total votes cast). Former Governor Buddy Roemer, seeking a gubernatorial comeback, came in fourth place. Foster's embrace of the Republican label and his conservative platform undercut Roemer, another Democrat-turned-Republican.

Reminiscent of his grandfather's inauguration virtually a century earlier, Mike Foster's inauguration ceremony on January 8, 1996, occurred at the Old State Capitol. Always a man of few words, Foster remarked briefly about the historicity of the occasion and made cordial statements about outgoing four-term Governor Edwin Edwards, who was present.

Foster defeated black Democratic candidates in both of his campaigns for governor—Cleo Fields in 1995 and Congressman William Jefferson of Louisiana's 2nd congressional district in 1999. He defeated Jefferson in a landslide, avoiding a runoff with 64 percent of the vote. His second inauguration took place on January 10, 2000.

== Tenure as Governor ==
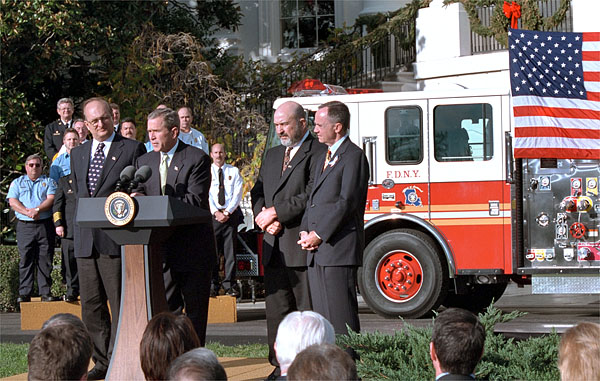
Foster watches as President George W. Bush speaks during a ceremony held to honor the gift of a new firetruck for the city of New York on the South Lawn in 2001

Foster was widely seen as having favored business to a greater degree than had previous governors. He retained the secretary of economic development, former legislator Kevin P. Reilly Sr. of Baton Rouge, the former CEO of Lamar Advertising Company of Baton Rouge. He ended state affirmative action and set-aside programs, which earned him the support of the business community but prompted protests from civil rights groups. Foster also targeted tort reform and ended the practice by which trial lawyers could seek punitive damages from businesses. Foster had close relations with the statewide pro-business lobbying group Louisiana Association of Business and Industry (LABI) for most of his tenure, though there were short-lived tensions in 2000 over Foster's attempt to raise business taxes in an effort to secure funding for higher education. By the end of his second term, Foster was receiving criticism for his reluctance to take business trips in order to attract businesses and jobs to Louisiana, and for enrolling in part-time law school classes while still in office. He also appointed then 24-year-old Bobby Jindal, later a two-term Republican governor, as head of the Louisiana Department of Health and Hospitals.

As his executive counsel, Foster appointed the Democrat Cheney Joseph Jr. (1942–2015), a member of the LSU Law School faculty and a former district attorney for East Baton Rouge Parish.

Foster worked to re-organize the state's community college system by creating the Louisiana Community and Technical College System, and expanded the Tuition Opportunity Program for Students (TOPS). Foster instituted mandatory standardized testing for grade advancement in a move described by his administration as an effort to make public schools more accountable. He made increasing teacher salaries a major priority, at one point promising to stop cashing his paychecks until teachers' salaries reached the Southern average. Andy Kopplin served as Governor Foster's chief of staff.

In 1997, Foster named former state budget director Ralph Perlman as secretary of the Louisiana Gaming Control Board, a position that Perlman held for five years while in his eighties.

Despite having run on an anti-gambling platform, in office Foster became a quiet supporter of the gambling industry. His advocacy of a bailout bill for the Harrah's casino in New Orleans helped ensure the passage of the measure.

=== Atchafalaya Basin Program ===
In November 1996 the U.S. Army Corps of Engineers requested that Foster appoint a lead agency to coordinate state participation in the Atchafalaya Basin Project. Foster chose the Louisiana Department of Natural Resources as the lead agency. In December 1996, the Atchafalaya Basin Advisory Committee was created, members appointed, and planning initiated that resulted in the Atchafalaya Basin Master Plan, as authorized by the U.S. Congress. A result of this plan was the creation of the Sherburne Complex Wildlife Management Area (Section 4.41-B) that includes the partnership of the U.S. Fish and Wildlife Service, the Louisiana Department of Wildlife and Fisheries (LDWF), and the U.S. Army Corps of Engineers. The area consists of 44,000 acres (180 km^{2}), and is managed by the Louisiana Department of Wildlife and Fisheries.

=== Foster and David Duke ===
In his 1995 campaign, Foster paid more than $150,000 for former Ku Klux Klansman David Duke's mailing list of supporters. After failing to report the purchase as a campaign expenditure, Foster became the first Louisiana governor to admit and pay a fine for a violation of the state's ethics code. Foster insisted that he did not need to report the expenditure because he paid Duke with his personal funds and did not utilize the list in his campaign. Duke also endorsed Foster in the 1995 campaign.

== Post-governorship ==
In retirement, Foster lived with his wife, Alice Cosner Foster (1940–2025), the daughter of the late Hubert and Vira Surles Cosner, to whom he was married for forty years, on the family estate near Franklin.

In 2003, Foster was inducted into the Louisiana Political Museum and Hall of Fame in Winnfield. In 2013, the state agreed to fund $2 million to renovate part of Franklin City Hall to provide housing for Foster's papers.

On September 28, 2020, news reports confirmed that Foster had entered hospice care. Less than a week later, Mike Foster died on October 4, 2020, at the age of 90.

== Electoral history ==
State Senator, 21st Senatorial District, 1987

Candidate	Affiliation	Support	Outcome
Mike Foster	Democratic	24,183 (64%)	Elected
Anthony Guarisco Jr.	Democratic	13,599 (36%)	Defeated

State Senator, 21st Senatorial District, 1991

Candidate	Affiliation	Support	Outcome
Mike Foster	Democratic	30,836 (85%)	Elected
Eddie Albares	Independent	5,232 (15%)	Defeated

1995 Louisiana gubernatorial election

Candidate	Affiliation	Support	Outcome
Mike Foster	Republican	385,267 (26%)	Runoff
Cleo Fields	Democratic	280,921 (19%)	Runoff
Mary Landrieu	Democratic	271,938 (18%)	Defeated
Buddy Roemer	Republican	263,330 (18%)	Defeated
Others	n.a.	274,440 (19%)	Defeated

Candidate	Affiliation	Support	Outcome
Mike Foster	Republican	984,499 (64%)	Elected
Cleo Fields	Democratic	565,861 (36%)	Defeated

1999 Louisiana gubernatorial election

Candidate	Affiliation	Support	Outcome
Mike Foster	Republican	805,203 (62%)	Elected
Bill Jefferson	Democratic	382,445 (30%)	Defeated
Others	n.a.	107,557 (8%)	Defeated

== Sources ==
- State of Louisiana – Biography
- DuBos, Clancy. "Foster on Fire." Gambit Weekly. October 3, 1995.
- Kurtz, David. "Mike's Millions: He may be a working man, but Mike Foster certainly doesn't have to." New Orleans Magazine, May 1996.
- Reeves, Miriam. The Governors of Louisiana. Gretna: Pelican Publishing, 1998.
- Warner, Chris. "Mike Foster's Legacy: What Will it Be?" State Business Louisiana. Winter 2002.
- Governor Murphy J. "Mike" Foster Jr.

== Videos ==
(1) Foster's Inauguration as Louisiana's 53rd Governor on January 8, 1996, at the Old State Capitol Grounds

(2) Second Inauguration on the State Capitol Grounds on January 10, 2000

(3) State of the State Address on April 29, 1996

(4) Joint Session of the Louisiana State Legislature from May 30, 1996

(5) Opening Address to the Louisiana State Legislature on March 31, 1997

(6) Special Session of the Louisiana State Legislature from March 23, 1998

(7) Opening Address to Fiscal Session of the Louisiana State Legislature from April 27, 1998

(8) Opening Address to the Louisiana State Legislature from March 29, 1999

(9) Gubernatorial Debate Forum from October 8, 1999

(10) Opening Address to the Louisiana State Legislature from March 19, 2000

(11) Fiscal Session from April 24, 2000

(12) Special Session from March 11, 2001

(13) Opening Address to the Louisiana State Legislature from March 26, 2001

(14) Press conference on the September 11th terrorist attacks on September 12, 2001

(15) Opening Address to the Louisiana State Legislature from April 29, 2002

(16) Final State of the State Address from March 31, 2003

Louisiana State Senate
Preceded by Anthony Guarisco	Member of the Louisiana State Senate from the 21st district 1988–1996	Succeeded by John Siracusa
Party political offices
Preceded by David Duke	Republican nominee for Governor of Louisiana; 1995, 1999	Succeeded by Bobby Jindal
Political offices
Preceded by Edwin Edwards	Governor of Louisiana; 1996–2004	Succeeded by Kathleen Blanco
