= Tom Greene (Louisiana politician) =

American politician

Thomas Alan "Tom" Greene

Louisiana State Senator from District 17 (Ascension, Assumption, East Baton Rouge, Iberville, Pointe Coupee, West Baton Rouge, and West Feliciana parishes)
- In office 1992–2000
- Preceded by: J. E. Jumonville, Jr.
- Succeeded by: Robert Mark Marionneaux, Jr.

Personal details
- Born: September 7, 1948 (age 78)
- Party: Democrat-turned-Republican
- Spouse: Cathy Castleman Greene
- Children: Holland Greene Nader; Craig Castleman Greene; Jason Ellfors Greene; Thomas Ryan Greene; Boyd Owens Greene
- Education: Louisiana State University
- Occupation: Veterinarian; Rancher; Engineer

Thomas Alan Greene is an American politician who served in the Louisiana Senate from 1992 to 2000.

He studied at Louisiana State University.

Political offices
Preceded by J. E. Jumonville, Jr.	Louisiana State Senator for District 17; Thomas Alan "Tom" Greene; 1992–2000	Succeeded by Robert M. Marionneaux
