= 1999 Kentucky gubernatorial election =

- November 2, 1999
- Turnout: 23.6% (▼20.9%)
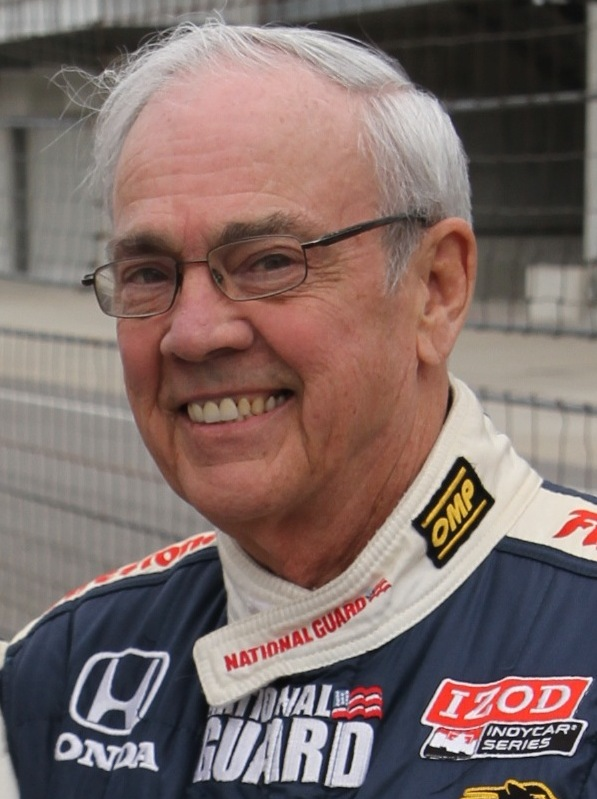

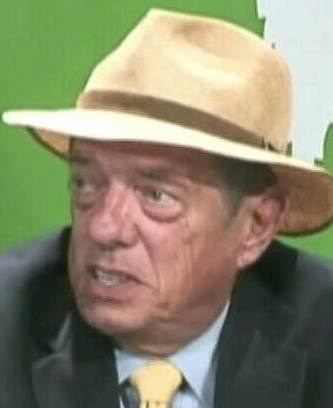
Nominee	Paul Patton	Peppy Martin	Gatewood Galbraith
Party	Democratic	Republican	Reform
Running mate	Steve Henry	Wanda Cornelius	Kathy Lyons
Popular vote	352,099	128,788	88,930
Percentage	60.70%	22.20%	15.33%
- Patton: 30–40% 40–50% 50–60% 60–70% 70–80% 80–90% Martin: 40–50% 50–60% 60–70%
Governor before election
Paul E. Patton
Democratic
Elected Governor
Paul E. Patton
Democratic

The 1999 Kentucky gubernatorial election took place on November 2, 1999, for the post of Governor of Kentucky. Democratic incumbent Governor Paul E. Patton defeated Republican nominee Peppy Martin to win a second term. Martin later switched parties and lost the 2023 Democratic primary for Governor of Kentucky to incumbent Andy Beshear.

1999 was the first time that the election was held since the Kentucky General Assembly changed its term limits law in 1992, allowing Patton to run again and leaving Virginia as the only state that prohibits its Governor from serving immediate successive terms.

This was the most recent Kentucky gubernatorial election to not have any candidates who previously served as Kentucky Attorney General.

== Democratic primary ==
=== Candidates ===
- Paul E. Patton, incumbent governor

== Republican primary ==
=== Candidates ===
- Peppy Martin
- David Lynn Williams, perennial candidate

=== Results ===
Republican primary results
Party	Candidate	Votes	%
Republican	Peppy Martin; Wanda Cornelius	19,248	51.27
Republican	David Lynn Williams; Joanna Williams	18,295	48.73
Total votes		37,543	100.0

== General election ==
=== Results ===
1999 Kentucky gubernatorial election
Party	Candidate	Votes	%	±%
Democratic	Paul E. Patton (incumbent); Stephen L. Henry (incumbent)	352,099	60.70	+9.81
Republican	Peppy Martin; Wanda Cornelius	128,788	22.20	−26.51
Reform	Gatewood Galbraith; Kathy Lyons	88,930	15.33	N/A
Natural Law	Nailah Jumoke-Yarbrough; John Flodstrom	6,934	1.20	N/A
Write-in	Hoby Anderson; Ron Simpson	3,323	0.57	N/A
Total votes		580,074	100.0	N/A
Turnout		600,664	23.59	−20.91
Registered electors		2,546,623		
Democratic hold				
