= Bruce Lunsford =

American film producer (1947–2026))

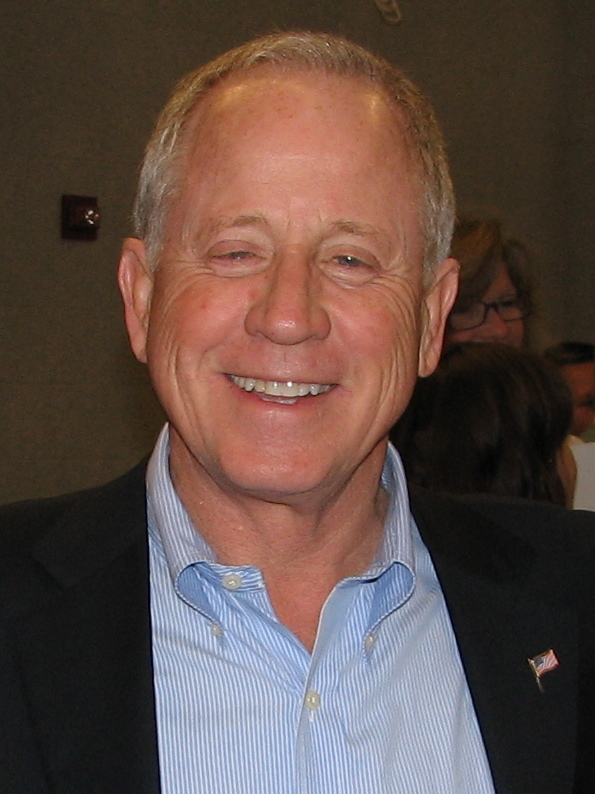

Kentucky Secretary of Commerce
- In office January 1, 1981 – December 13, 1983
- Governor: John Y. Brown Jr.
- Preceded by: Larry Townsend (Secretary of Development)
- Succeeded by: Carroll Knicely

Personal details
- Born: William Bruce Lunsford; November 11, 1947 Kenton County, Kentucky, U.S.
- Died: September 5, 2026 (aged 78)
- Party: Democratic
- Education: University of Kentucky (BA); Northern Kentucky University (JD)

William Bruce Lunsford (November 11, 1947 – September 5, 2026) was an American attorney, businessman and politician from Kentucky. He served various roles in the Kentucky Democratic Party, including party treasurer, Deputy Development Secretary, and Head of Commerce. Lunsford was the Democratic nominee for Kentucky's United States Senate seat in 2008, unsuccessfully challenging incumbent Mitch McConnell.

== Early life and education ==
Bruce Lunsford was born in Kenton County, Kentucky on November 11, 1947, to Amos and Billie Lunsford; Lunsford's mother, Billie, was later killed in an automobile accident by a drunk driver. When Lunsford was a child, his father left his job as a union shop steward for General Electric Cincinnati and borrowed money to purchase a small farm in Piner, Kentucky, where Lunsford spent his childhood.

In high school, Lunsford became an all-conference basketball player at Simon Kenton High School, and was also a five-year starter on the baseball team.

When he enrolled at University of Kentucky in 1965, he worked as an intramural adviser on campus and joined the Pi Kappa Alpha fraternity. Lunsford graduated with a political science degree in 1969, with a minor in accounting.

After graduation, Lunsford went to work for a Cincinnati accounting firm, passed the CPA exam and became a Certified Public Accountant in 1970. That fall, he started taking evening classes at the Salmon P. Chase College of Law, and graduated in the top ten percent of his class in 1974.

Lunsford entered the National Guard during law school. After training at Fort Bragg and Fort Lee, he became a member of the U.S. Army Reserves at Fort Thomas, where he stayed for five and a half years.

He donated $1 million to the Salmon P. Chase College of Law.

== Business career ==
Lunsford and two other partners founded Vencor in 1985. Originally the company was called Vencare, but an initial public offering was registered under the name Vencor in 1989. At one point during Lunsford's tenure, Vencor grew to employ over 65,000 people in 45 states, with more than 300 facilities caring for 50,000 patients. Vencor also became a Fortune 500 company.

In 1998, Vencor was split into two companies. One company, Ventas became a real estate investment trust (REIT) which owned all of the real-estate property, and leased space to the second company, Vencor, which operated the facilities. At the time, Vencor was expanding rapidly, and it considered that using a REIT provided a better financing structure to allow the companies to grow. At the time of the split, all shareholders in Vencor were issued one share of Ventas for every share of Vencor that they held.

In 1997, the US Government drastically reduced Medicare reimbursement rates with the passage of the Balanced Budget Act of 1997, which had a significant impact on the nursing home industry. The New York Times business writer Kenneth Gilpin wrote that "The drop in payments was so dramatic that the financial structures of many of these companies were not flexible enough to adjust." He went on the mention that as of the summer of 1999, 12 percent of the 1.7 million nursing home beds were operating under Chapter 11 bankruptcy protection.

As a result of the Medicare cuts, Vencor filed for Chapter 11 protection from bankruptcy in September 1999. At the time, five of the top seven nursing homes filed for chapter 11 protection from bankruptcy, however Vencor (then Kindred) was the first to emerge. Vencor was renamed Kindred healthcare in 2001.

During the Chapter 11 reorganization, Vencor shares lost their value; however, Ventas shares improved from below $4 per share in 1999 to trading around $50 per share in April 2008.

He served as the CEO of both companies until resigning in 1999, and remained the Chairman of Ventas until 2003.

A civil claims suit in 2001 alleged that Vencor knowingly submitted false claims to Medicare, Medicaid, and TRICARE, the military's health care program. Vencor maintained that they had committed no wrongdoing and continued to dispute the claims until after Lunsford left the company. Vencor later settled the case for $104.5 million, including $54 million for alleged improper claims in Medicare cost reports, $24 million for alleged overbilling in respiratory care services, and $20 million for alleged failure of care claims. The company did not admit any wrongdoing in the settlement.

Lunsford was involved as an investor, director and adviser to many other start-up businesses through Lunsford Capital and was also active in thoroughbred horse racing and independent film production. He was inducted into the Kentucky Entrepreneur Hall of Fame in 2012.

He raced several graded stakes winners, including Madcap Escapade, First Samurai, Tessa Blue and Bel Air Beauty. Through Hart-Lunsford Pictures, he co-produced several acclaimed independent films, including Grace is Gone, Diminished Capacity, Dedication, Birds of America, and Me and Orson Welles.

== Political career and public service ==
=== Roles in Brown administration ===
In the 1979 race for Governor of Kentucky, Lunsford became the Northern Kentucky representative for the campaign of John Y. Brown Jr. When Brown won the primary Lunsford became treasurer of the Kentucky Democratic Party.

When Brown won the general election, he made Lunsford the Deputy Development Secretary, then his Legislative Liaison. When Development Secretary Larry Townsend stepped down, effective January 1, 1981, Lunsford was named as acting secretary. Later that month, Brown announced a reorganization of his Development Cabinet to form Kentucky's first Commerce Cabinet, with Lunsford at its head as Secretary of Commerce. In that post, Lunsford marketed the state as a business destination and helped land more than 55,000 new jobs and $4.6 billion in new manufacturing investment.

Some of the significant projects Lunsford negotiated included setting up the United Parcel Service Hub in Louisville, the Delta Air Lines Hub in Northern Kentucky and downtown redevelopment projects in Ashland, Lexington and Louisville. Lunsford also led the effort to reach out to Japan by establishing a Kentucky office there, still in existence today, which has been instrumental in attracting substantial Japanese investment to the state.

=== Public service ===
Lunsford always worked in education and served on the board of trustees of the University of Kentucky, Bellarmine College and Centre College.

He ran for the Democratic nomination for Governor of Kentucky in 2003. The race was a contentious contest with then-Attorney General Ben Chandler and other candidates. Late in the primary, Chandler ran television ads alleging abuse at facilities operated by Lunsford's company. Lunsford dropped out of the race, blaming these ads, just days before the primary, endorsing Democratic candidate Jody Richards, who lost narrowly to Chandler.

Long after the primary, Lunsford endorsed Republican candidate Ernie Fletcher. After Fletcher won the election, Lunsford served on Ernie Fletcher's transition team, as Chairman of the Blue Ribbon Commission on Governmental Efficiency and Organization. Lunsford has contributed thousands of dollars to both Democrats and Republicans over a period of twenty years.

Lunsford was a Democratic candidate for Governor of Kentucky in 2007. His running mate was Greg Stumbo, Attorney General of Kentucky. Lunsford placed second in the primary to Steve Beshear. Lunsford won just over 74,000 votes (21%), beating former Lieutenant Governor of Kentucky Steve Henry and Speaker of the Kentucky House of Representatives Jody Richards, but finishing far behind winner Beshear's 142,000+ votes (41%).[4]

=== 2008 campaign for United States Senate ===
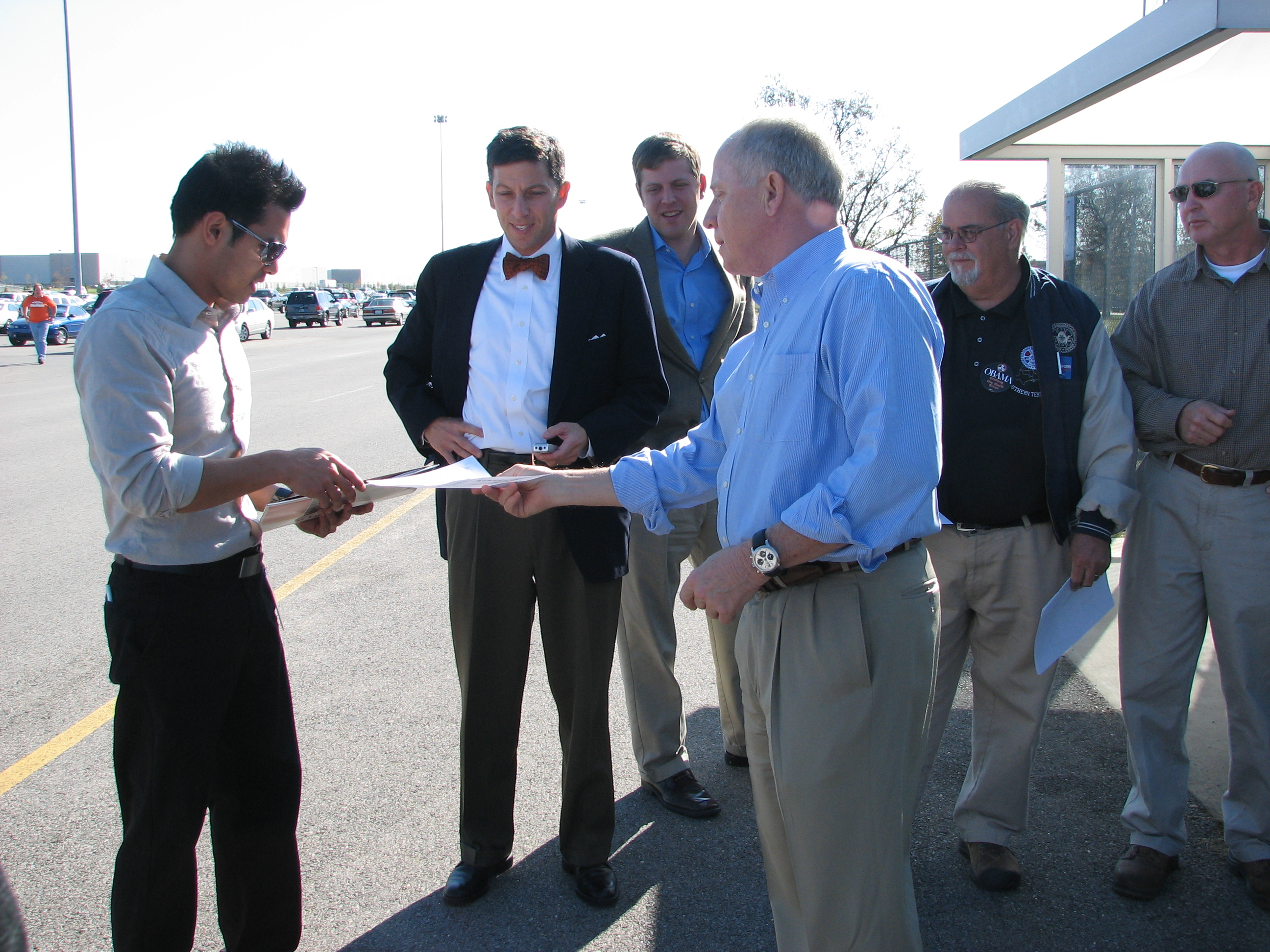
Lunsford campaigning in October 2008

Primary election

On January 29, 2008, Lunsford announced that he would run in the Democratic primary in hopes of facing Mitch McConnell in the general election for the Senate in November 2008. He said he had been asked to run by Kentucky Governor Steve Beshear and that he did not expect to spend the millions he had spent on his campaign in previous elections.

On May 20, 2008, Lunsford won the Democratic nomination for US Senate. He received 316,763 votes (51%), followed by Greg Fischer's 209,662 votes (34%).

General election

The general election campaign saw Lunsford start the race as a heavy underdog to Mitch McConnell, only to turn it into the race of McConnell's career as the economic crisis deepened and played to the businessman's expertise and populist policy stance.

It was this surge that led Democratic President Bill Clinton, Senator Hillary Clinton, and former Senators Max Cleland and Bob Kerrey to campaign for Lunsford, attempting to counter the 2-to-1 spending advantage and $20+ million war chest of incumbent Sen. Mitch McConnell.

On Election Day, Lunsford was defeated but outperformed Barack Obama at the top of the ticket by 10%.

== Death ==
Lunsford died on September 5, 2026, at the age of 78.

== Electoral history ==
=== 2008 United States Senate General Election ===
2008 Kentucky U.S. Senator general election
Party	Candidate	Votes	%	±%
Republican	Mitch McConnell	953,816	53.0	−11.7
Democratic	Bruce Lunsford	847,005	47.0	+11.7
Turnout		1,800,821	61.9	+19.2
Republican hold		Swing		

=== 2008 United States Senate Election, Democratic Primary ===
Primary – May 20, 2008
Candidate name	Vote Percent	
Bruce Lunsford	316,723	51.1%
Greg Fischer	209,704	33.9%
David Williams	34,328	5.5%
James Rice	20,380	3.3%
Michael Cassaro	17,343	2.8%
Kenneth Stepp	13,438	2.2%
David Wylie	7,514	1.2%

=== 2007 Kentucky Gubernatorial Election, Democratic Primary ===
Democratic Primary Election, May 22
Candidate	Party	Votes	Percent
Steve Beshear	Democratic	142,838	41.02%
Bruce Lunsford	Democratic	74,578	21.42%
Steve Henry	Democratic	60,893	17.49%
Jody Richards	Democratic	45,433	13.05%
Gatewood Galbraith	Democratic	20,704	5.95%
Otis Hensley	Democratic	3,792	1.09%

Party political offices
Preceded by Lois Combs Weinberg	Democratic nominee for U.S. Senator from Kentucky (Class 2); 2008	Succeeded by Alison Lundergan Grimes
