= Government trifecta =

Political situation in some democratic governments

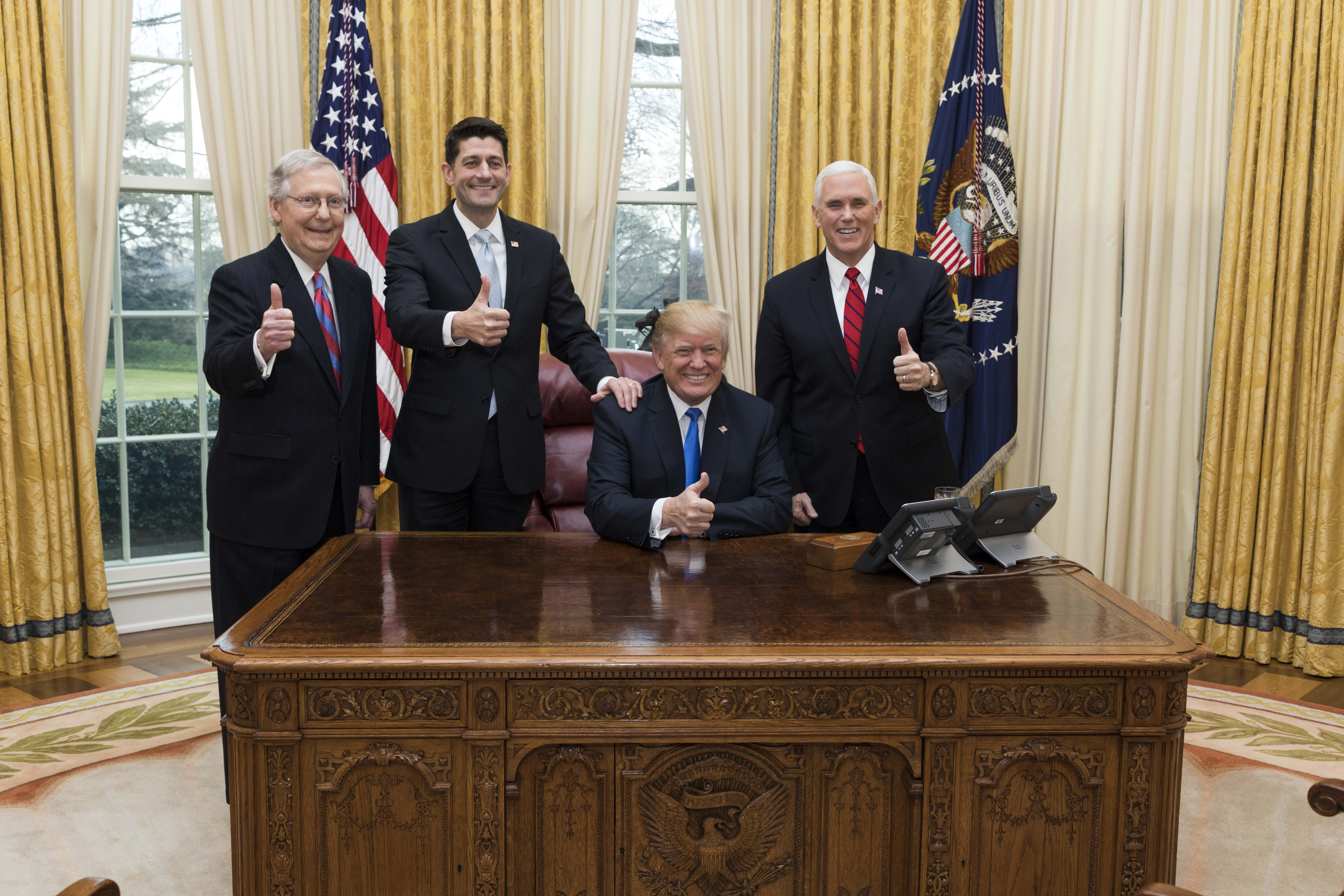
From 2017 to 2019 and from 2025 to 2027 in the United States, the Republican Party has held the Senate, House of Representatives, and the presidency. Senate Majority Leader Mitch McConnell, Speaker of the House Paul Ryan, President Donald Trump, and Vice President (President of the Senate) Mike Pence, all Republicans, are pictured during the first trifecta in the 115th United States Congress.

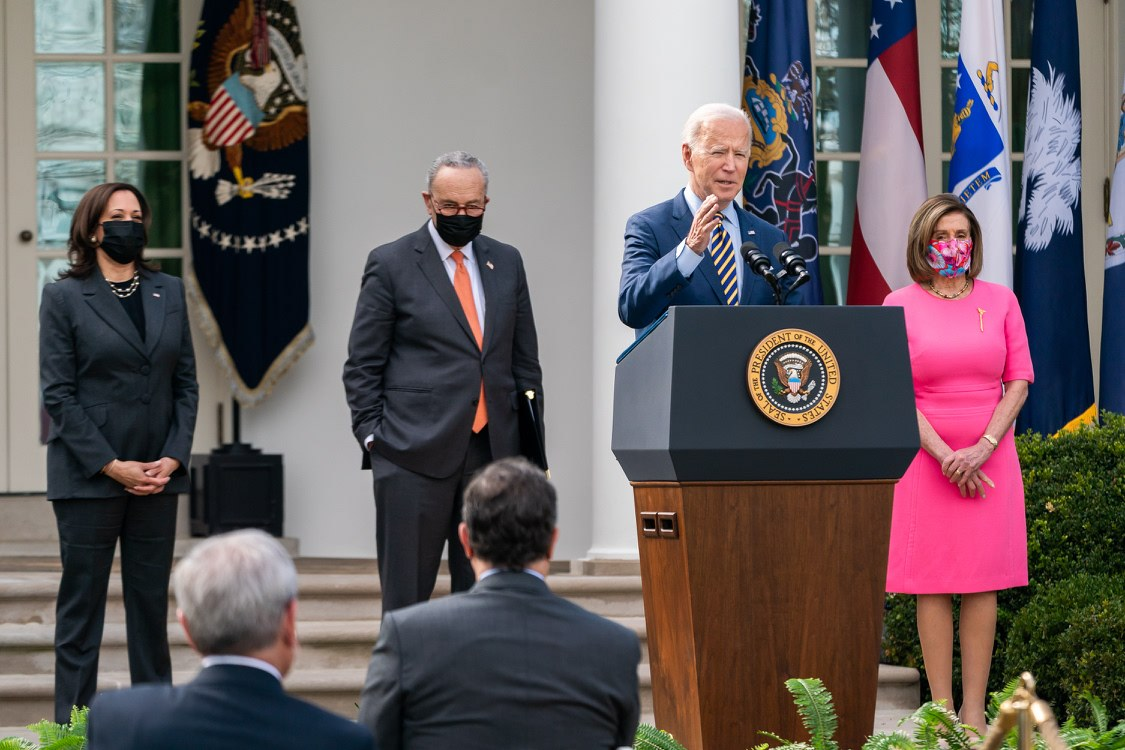
From 2021 to 2023 in the United States, the Democratic Party held the Senate, House of Representatives, and the presidency. Vice President Kamala Harris, Senate Majority Leader Chuck Schumer, President Joe Biden, and Speaker of the House Nancy Pelosi, all Democrats, are pictured. The Democrats controlled the Senate with the tie-breaking vote from the Vice President.

In the politics of the United States, a government trifecta is a political situation in which the same political party controls the presidency and both chambers of Congress. The term is primarily used in the United States, where it originated, and is borrowed from horse race betting.

Government trifectas are seen as beneficial by some and as undesirable by others. Those in favor argue that government trifectas are efficient and avoid gridlocks. Opponents argue that trifectas discourage policing of those in power by the opposition and that they do not limit spending and the expansion of undesirable laws, which sometimes can trigger democratic backsliding. Opponents also argue that government trifectas do not tend to lead to compromise since one party can simply implement its goals unopposed. Consequently, the incumbent party may alter the structure of executive agencies to prepare for when it is bound to lose its incumbency.

== United States ==
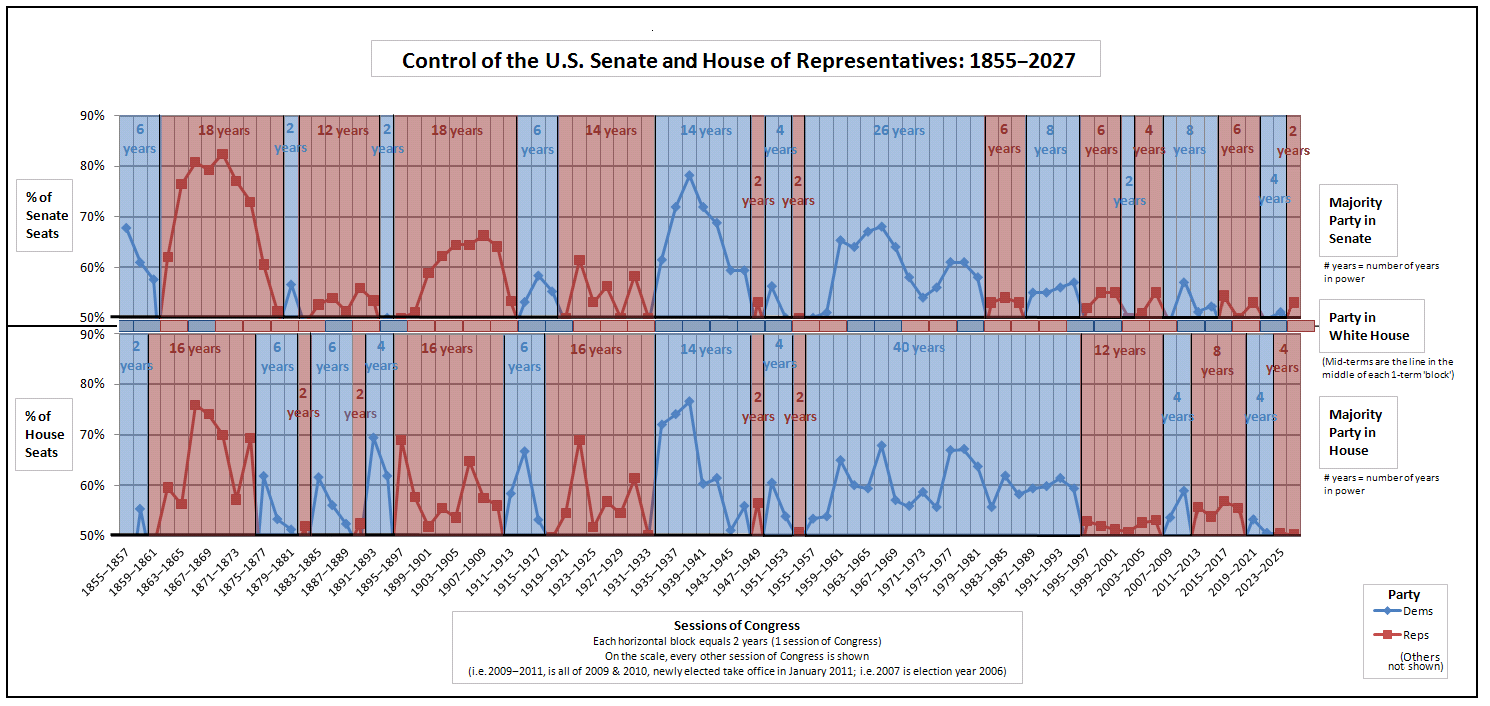
Control of the Senate, Presidency, and House since 1855: any column where all three sections show the same color is a trifecta.

The term is primarily used in the United States, where the federal government level consists of the president and the Congress with its two chambers, the House and the Senate.

=== State government trifectas ===
US state and territory governments (governor and legislature) by party control: Democratic control Republican control NPP control Split control

At the state level, a trifecta means that one party holds the governorship and both legislative houses. The sole exception is in Nebraska, where there is a unicameral legislature.

Year	Total	Dem	Rep	Spread
2027	39	21	18	D+3
2026	39	16	23	R+7
2025	38	15	23	R+8
2024	40	17	23	R+6
2023	39	17	22	R+5
2022	37	14	23	R+9
2021	38	15	23	R+8
2020	36	15	21	R+6
2019	36	14	22	R+8
2018	33	7	26	R+19
2017	31	5	26	R+21
2016	31	6	25	R+19
2015	31	7	24	R+17
2014	30	7	23	R+16
2013	36	12	24	R+12
2012	34	11	23	R+12
2011	32	11	21	R+10
2010	24	16	8	D+8
2009	26	17	9	D+8
2008	23	14	9	D+5
2007	24	15	9	D+6
2006	20	8	12	R+4
2005	20	8	12	R+4
2004	21	9	12	R+3
2003	21	9	12	R+3
2002	20	9	11	R+2
2001	21	9	13	R+4
2000	24	8	15	R+7
1999	23	9	14	R+5
1998	19	6	13	R+7
1997	18	6	12	R+6
1996	21	7	14	R+7
1995	23	8	15	R+7
1994	20	16	4	D+12
1993	21	18	3	D+15
1992	18	15	3	D+12

A visual representation of US state government trifectas over time:

View source data.

== See also ==
- Coattail effect
- Triumvirate
- Two-party system
- Dominant-party system
