= 1995 United States elections =

- ← 1993 1994 1995 1996 1997 → Off-year elections
- Election day: November 7

Congressional special elections
- Seats contested: 2
- Net seat change: Republican +1

Gubernatorial elections
- Seats contested: 3
- Net seat change: Republican +1
- 1995 gubernatorial election results map

Legend
- Democratic hold Republican gain Republican hold No election

Elections were held on Tuesday, November 7, 1995, comprising 3 gubernatorial races, 2 congressional special elections, and a plethora of other local elections across the United States. No Senate special elections were held.

== Federal elections ==
=== United States House of Representatives special elections ===
In 1995 two seats were under special elections.

District	Incumbent			This race	
District	Member	Party	First elected	Results	Candidates
California 15	Norman Mineta	Democratic	1974	Incumbent resigned October 10, 1995 to accept a position with Lockheed Martin. New member elected December 12, 1995. Republican gain.	▌ ✓ Tom Campbell (Republican); [data missing]
Illinois 2	Mel Reynolds	Democratic	1992	Incumbent resigned October 1, 1995. New member elected December 12, 1995. Democratic hold.	▌ ✓ Jesse Jackson Jr. (Democratic) 74.2%; ▌Thomas Somer (Republican) 25.8%

== State and local elections ==
Several statewide elections were held this year, most notably the gubernatorial elections in three U.S. States.

=== Gubernatorial elections ===
The Republican party gained Louisiana.

State	Incumbent	Party	First elected	Result	Candidates
Kentucky	Brereton Jones	Democratic	1991	Incumbent term-limited. New governor elected. Democratic hold.	✓ Paul E. Patton (Democratic) 50.9%; Larry Forgy (Republican) 48.7%
Louisiana	Edwin Edwards	Democratic	1972; 1979 (term-limited); 1983; 1987 (withdrew); 1991	Incumbent retired. New governor elected. Republican gain.	✓ Mike Foster (Republican) 63.5%; Cleo Fields (Democratic) 36.5%
Mississippi	Kirk Fordice	Republican	1991	Incumbent re-elected.	✓ Kirk Fordice (Republican) 55.6%; Dick Molpus (Democratic) 44.4%
