= Fordice =

Fordice is a surname. Notable people with the surname include:

- Kirk Fordice (1934–2004), American politician and businessman
- Pat Fordice (1934–2007), First Lady of Mississippi, wife of Kirk
