= 1991 United States elections =

- ← 1989 1990 1991 1992 1993 → Off-year elections
- Election day: November 5

Senate elections
- Seats contested: 1 mid-term vacancy
- Net seat change: Democratic +1

House elections
- Seats contested: 6 mid-term vacancies
- Net seat change: Democratic +1

Gubernatorial elections
- Seats contested: 3
- Net seat change: 0
- 1991 gubernatorial election results map

Legend
- Democratic gain Democratic hold Republican gain

Elections were held in the United States on November 5, 1991, consisting of three gubernatorial races, six House special elections, many local elections and a Senate special election following the death of Republican senator John Heinz in Pennsylvania, won by Democrat Harris Wofford, the first time the seat had been won by a Democrat since 1940.

== Federal elections ==
=== Senate ===
==== Pennsylvania ====
On April 4, 1991, incumbent senator John Heinz was killed when his Piper Aerostar aircraft collided with a helicopter over Merion Elementary School in Lower Merion Township, a suburb northwest of Philadelphia, killing Heinz, along with four others. Governor Bob Casey appointed Harris Wofford as the interim senator. Because of how close Heinz's death was to the typical primary election, both Wofford and Republican nominee Dick Thornburgh were selected without primaries. Campaigning in favor of increased healthcare access, often criticizing increasingly unpopular president George H. W. Bush, Wofford defeated Thornburgh, despite early polling deficits.

=== United States House of Representatives special elections ===
In 1991, six special elections were held to fill vacancies to the United States Congress. They were for Massachusetts's 1st congressional district, Illinois's 15th congressional district, Texas's 3rd congressional district, Arizona's 2nd congressional district, Pennsylvania's 2nd congressional district and Virginia's 7th congressional district.

District	Incumbent			This race	
District	Member	Party	First elected	Results	Candidates
Massachusetts 1	Silvio O. Conte	Republican	1958	Incumbent died February 8, 1991. New member elected June 18, 1991. Democratic gain.	▌ ✓ John Olver (Democratic) 49.6%; ▌Steven Pierce (Republican) 48.2%; Others: ▌Patrick Joseph Armstrong (Independent) 1.3%; ▌ Dennis M. Kelly (Pro-Democracy Reform) 0.6%; ▌ Thomas Boynton (Unenrolled) 0.2%
Illinois 15	Edward Rell Madigan	Republican	1972	Incumbent resigned upon appointment as U.S. Secretary of Agriculture. New member elected July 2, 1991. Republican hold.	▌ ✓ Thomas W. Ewing (Republican) 66.3%; ▌Gerald A. Bradley (Democratic) 33.6%
Texas 3	Steve Bartlett	Republican	1982	Incumbent resigned March 11, 1991 to become Mayor of Dallas. New member elected May 18, 1991. Republican hold.	▌ ✓ Sam Johnson (Republican) 52.6%; ▌Tom Pauken (Republican) 47.4%
Arizona 2	Mo Udall	Democratic	1961 (Special)	Incumbent resigned for health reasons. New member elected October 3, 1991. Democratic hold.	▌ ✓ Ed Pastor (Democratic) 55.5%; ▌Pat Conner (Republican) 44.4%
Pennsylvania 2	William H. Gray III	Democratic	1978	Incumbent resigned to become director of the UNCF. New member elected November 5, 1991. Democratic hold.	▌ ✓ Lucien E. Blackwell (Democratic) 39.2%; ▌Chaka Fattah (Consumer) 28.0%; ▌John F. White Jr. (John F. White Jr. Party) 27.6%; ▌Nadine G. Smith-Bulford (Republican) 5.2%
Virginia 7	D. French Slaughter Jr.	Republican	1984	Incumbent resigned due to ill health (stroke). New member elected November 5, 1991. Republican hold.	▌ ✓ George Allen (Republican) 63.9%; ▌Kay E. Slaughter (Democratic) 35.7%

== State and local elections ==
=== Gubernatorial elections ===
Three gubernatorial elections were held in 1991 in Kentucky, Louisiana and Mississippi. The Louisiana gubernatorial election was notable for the runoff, which pitted Democratic former governor Edwin Edwards against Republican former Grand Wizard of the Ku Klux Klan, David Duke. Edwards won following an unusually toxic campaign, largely due to the endorsement of incumbent Republican governor Buddy Roemer, who had not advanced to the runoff.

Mississippi elected its first Republican governor since 1873.

State	Incumbent	Party	First elected	Result	Candidates
Kentucky	Wallace Wilkinson	Democratic	1987	Incumbent term-limited. New governor elected. Democratic hold.	✓ Brereton C. Jones (Democratic) 64.7%; Larry J. Hopkins (Republican) 35.3%
Louisiana	Buddy Roemer	Republican	1987 (Note: Louisiana governor Buddy Roemer was elected as a Democrat in 1987, but switched to the Republican Party in March 1991.)	Incumbent eliminated in primary. New governor elected. Democratic gain.	✓ Edwin Edwards (Democratic) 61.2%; David Duke (Republican) 38.8%
Mississippi	Ray Mabus	Democratic	1987	Incumbent lost re-election. New governor elected. Republican gain.	✓ Kirk Fordice (Republican) 50.8%; Ray Mabus (Democratic) 47.6%; Shawn O'Hara (Independent) 1.6%
