= 1995 United States gubernatorial elections =

← 1994	October 21, November 7 and 18, 1995	1996 →

3 governorships
	Majority party	Minority party
Party	Republican	Democratic
Seats before	30	19
Seats after	31	18
Seat change	▲1	▼1
Popular vote	1,918,987	1,430,676
Percentage	57.22%	42.66%
Seats up	1	2
Seats won	2	1
- Republican gain Republican hold Democratic hold

United States gubernatorial elections were held on November 7, 1995, in three states. Prior to the elections, Democrats held two seats and Republicans one. With the Republican gain of the open seat in Louisiana, Republicans held two seats and Democrats one following the elections.

== Election results ==
State	Incumbent	Party	First elected	Result	Candidates
Kentucky	Brereton Jones	Democratic	1991	Incumbent term-limited. New governor elected. Democratic hold.	✓ Paul E. Patton (Democratic) 50.9%; Larry Forgy (Republican) 48.7%
Louisiana	Edwin Edwards	Democratic	1972; 1979 (term-limited); 1983; 1987 (withdrew); 1991	Incumbent retired. New governor elected. Republican gain.	✓ Mike Foster (Republican) 63.5%; Cleo Fields (Democratic) 36.5%
Mississippi	Kirk Fordice	Republican	1991	Incumbent re-elected.	✓ Kirk Fordice (Republican) 55.6%; Dick Molpus (Democratic) 44.4%

== Closest races ==
States where the margin of victory was under 5%:

1. Kentucky, 2.2%

== Kentucky ==
1995 Kentucky gubernatorial election
← 1991	November 7, 1995	1999 →
- Turnout: 43.8% ▼0.4 pp
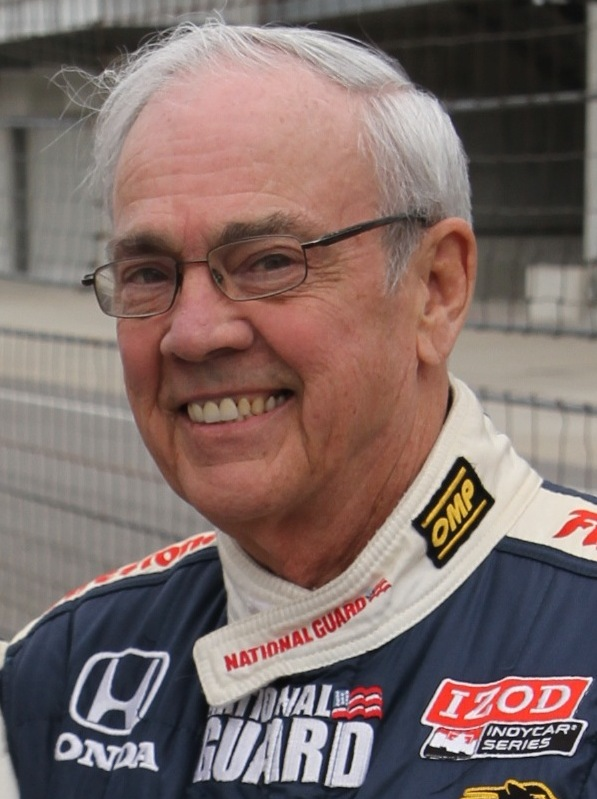

Nominee	Paul Patton	Larry Forgy
Party	Democratic	Republican
Running mate	Steve Henry	Tom Handy
Popular vote	500,605	479,227
Percentage	50.9%	48.7%
- Patton: 50–60% 60–70% 70–80% 80–90% Forgy: 40–50% 50–60% 60–70% 70–80%
Governor before election
Brereton Jones
Democratic
Elected Governor
Paul E. Patton
Democratic

The 1995 Kentucky gubernatorial election took place on November 7, 1995. Incumbent Governor Brereton Jones was not eligible to run for a second term due to term limits established by the Kentucky Constitution, creating an open seat. At the time, Kentucky and Virginia were the only states that prohibited their Governors from serving immediate successive terms. The Democratic nominee, Lieutenant Governor Paul E. Patton, defeated Republican nominee Larry Forgy to win his first term as governor. It was the last time that the election was held until the Kentucky General Assembly changed its term limits law in 1992, allowing Patton to run again in 1999 and leaving Virginia as the only state that prohibits its governor from serving immediate successive terms.

== Louisiana ==
1995 Louisiana gubernatorial election
← 1991	October 21, 1995 (first round); November 18, 1995 (runoff)	1999 →
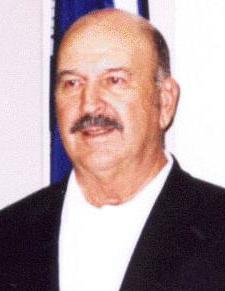

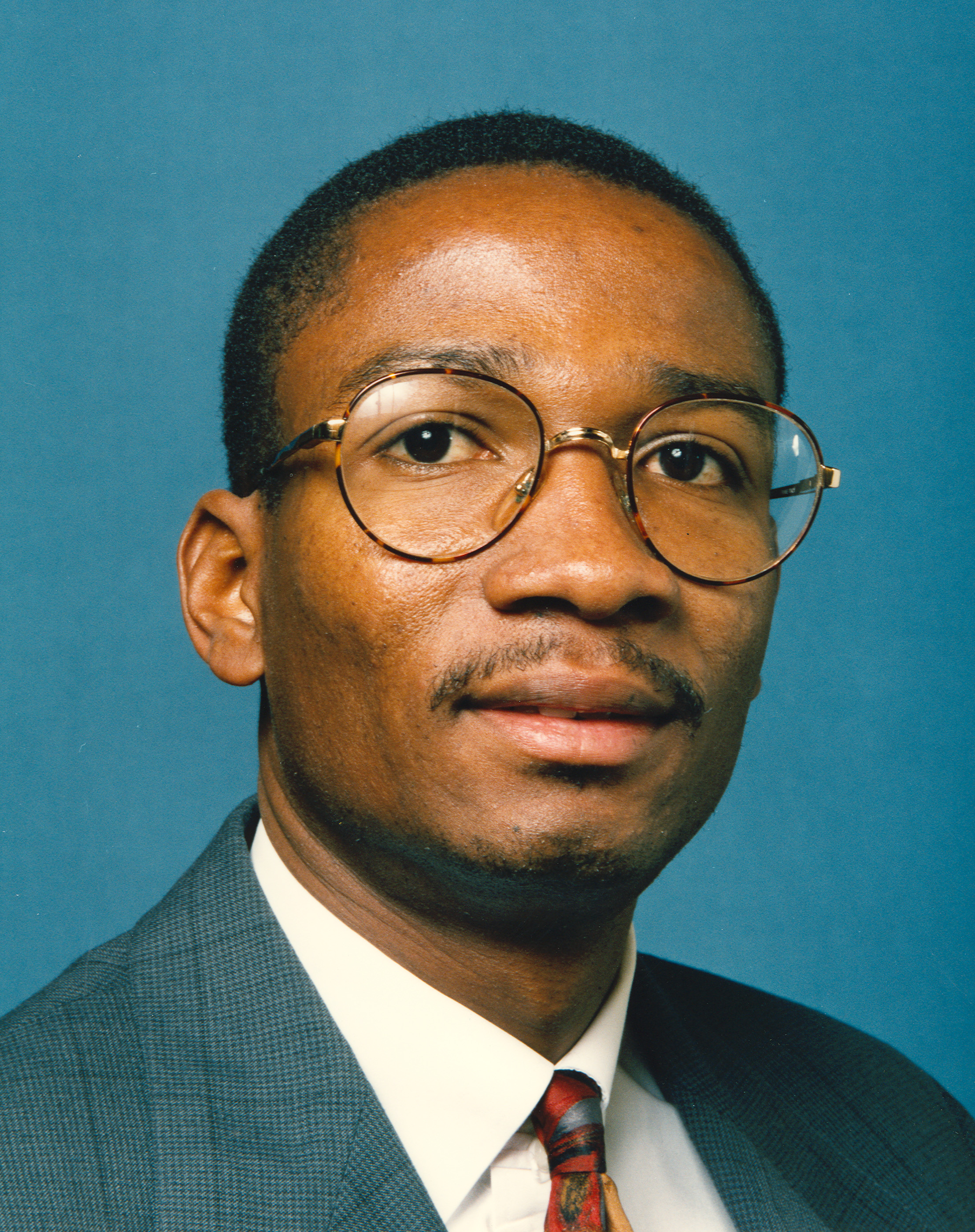

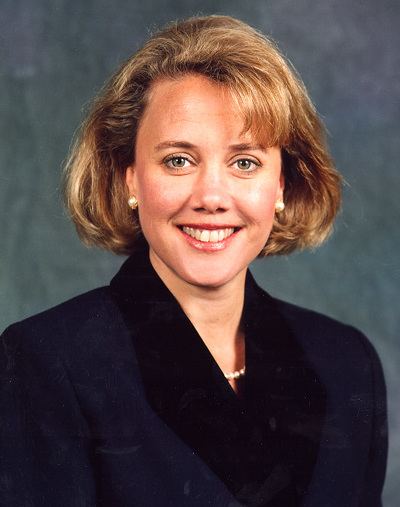

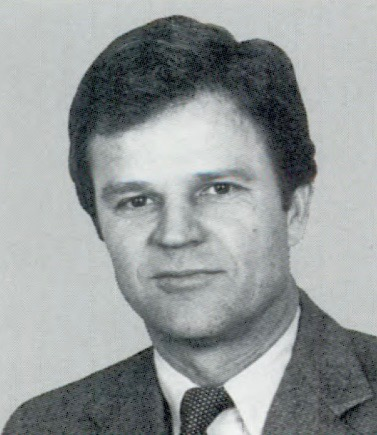

Candidate	Mike Foster	Cleo Fields	Mary Landrieu
Party	Republican	Democratic	Democratic
First round	385,267; 26.14%	280,921; 19.06%	271,938; 18.45%
Runoff	984,499; 63.5%	565,861; 36.5%	Eliminated
Candidate	Buddy Roemer	Phil Preis
Party	Republican	Democratic
First round	263,330; 17.87%	133,271; 9.04%
Runoff	Eliminated	Eliminated
- Foster: 20–30% 30–40% 40–50% 50–60% 60–70% 70–80% 80–90% Fields: 20–30% 30–40% 40–50% 50–60% 70–80% Landrieu: 20–30% 30–40% Roemer: 20–30% 30–40% Preis: 20–30% 30–40%
Governor before election
Edwin Edwards
Democratic
Elected Governor
Mike Foster
Republican

The 1995 Louisiana gubernatorial election was held on November 18, 1995, to elect the governor of Louisiana.

Incumbent Democratic governor Edwin Edwards had planned to run for re-election to a second consecutive and fifth overall term in office, but he announced in June 1994, shortly after marrying his second wife Candy Picou, that he would be retiring from politics at the end of his term.

All elections in Louisiana— with the exception of U.S. presidential elections— follow a variation of the open primary system called the jungle primary. Candidates of any and all parties are listed on one ballot; voters need not limit themselves to the candidates of one party when voting. Unless one candidate takes more than 50% of the vote in the first round, a run-off election is then held between the top two candidates, who may in fact be members of the same party.

In this election, the first round of voting was held on October 21, 1995, with Republican state senator Mike Foster and Democratic U.S. representative Cleo Fields finishing first and second with 26.1% and 19%, respectively. Foster defeated Fields in the November 18 runoff in a landslide. As of 2023, this is the most recent Louisiana gubernatorial election in which a successful Republican candidate was not elected in the first round.

== Mississippi ==
1995 Mississippi gubernatorial election
← 1991	November 7, 1995	1999 →
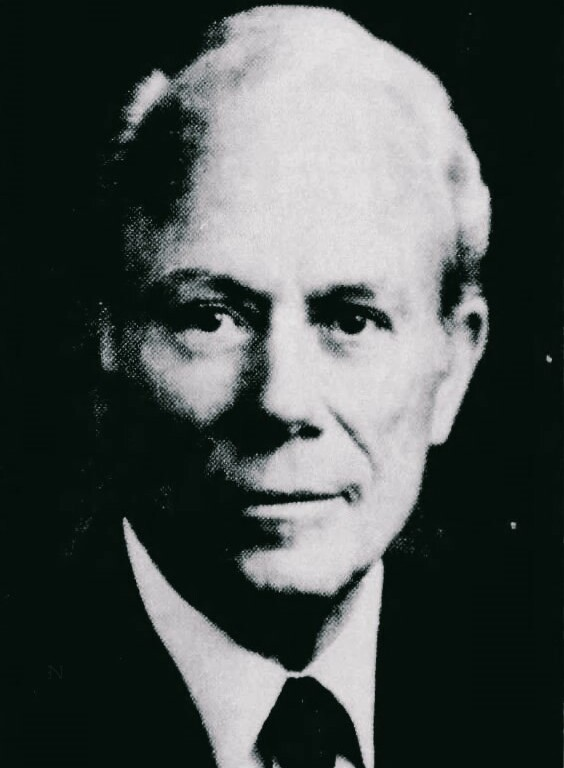

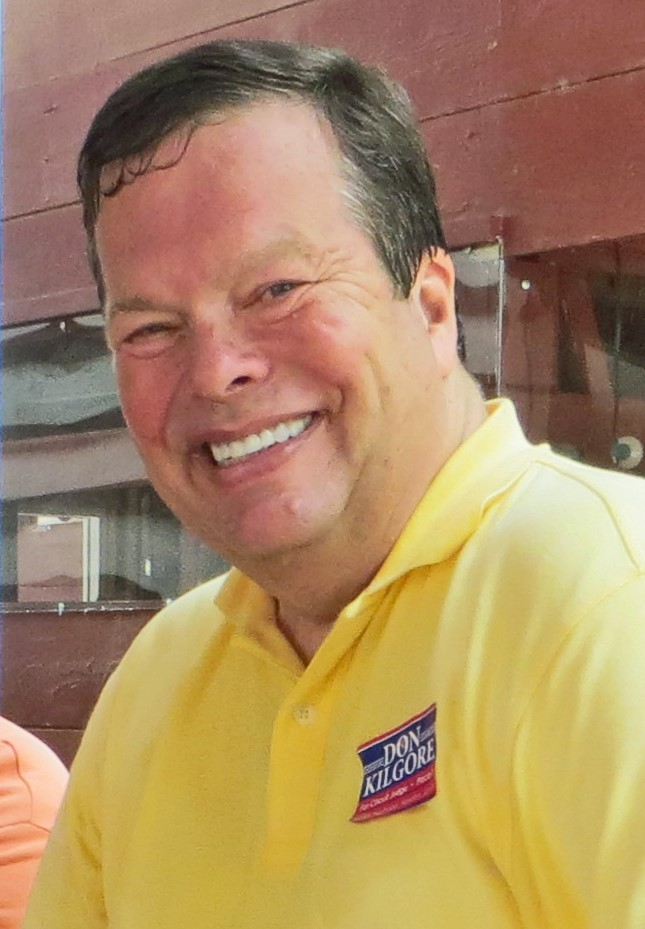
Nominee	Kirk Fordice	Dick Molpus
Party	Republican	Democratic
Popular vote	455,261	364,210
Percentage	55.56%	44.44%
- County results Fordice: 50-60% 60-70% 70-80% Molpus: 50-60% 60-70% 70-80% 80-90% Tie: 50-60%
Governor before election
Kirk Fordice
Republican
Elected Governor
Kirk Fordice
Republican

The 1995 Mississippi gubernatorial election took place on November 7, 1995 to elect the Governor of Mississippi. Incumbent Republican Kirk Fordice won reelection to a second term. This is the last time that a gubernatorial nominee and a lieutenant gubernatorial nominee of different political parties were elected governor and lieutenant governor in Mississippi.

== See also ==
- 1995 United States House of Representatives elections
