= Eddie Briggs =

American politician

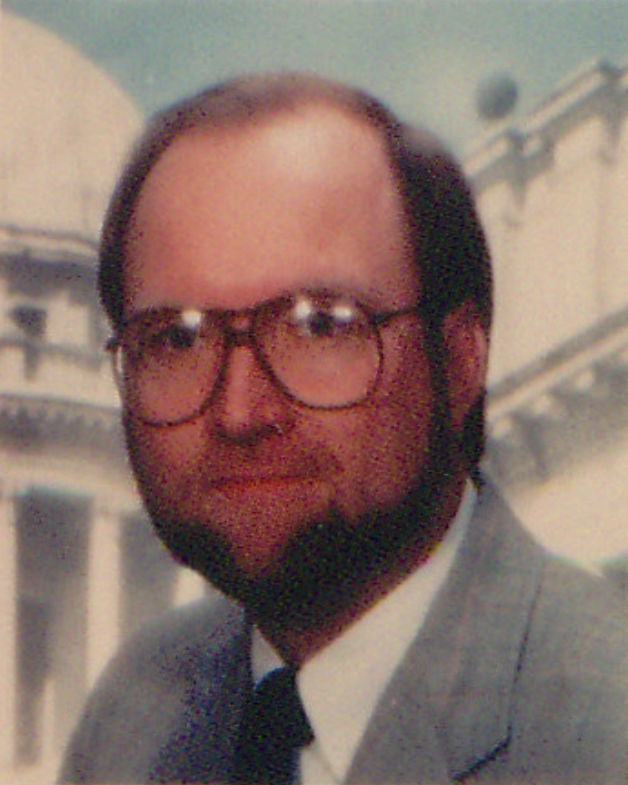
- Official portrait of Briggs, 1988

28th Lieutenant Governor of Mississippi
- In office January 9, 1992 – January 4, 1996
- Governor: Kirk Fordice
- Preceded by: Brad Dye
- Succeeded by: Ronnie Musgrove

Member of the Mississippi State Senate from the 32nd district
- In office January 3, 1984 – January 7, 1992
- Preceded by: Algie Davis
- Succeeded by: Sampson Jackson

Personal details
- Born: Eddie Jerome Briggs; October 14, 1949 (age 76)
- Party: Republican (1991–present); Democratic (until 1991)
- Occupation: Lawyer; politician

Eddie Jerome Briggs (born October 14, 1949) is an American politician and lawyer. After service in the Mississippi State Senate, Briggs was the 28th Lieutenant Governor of Mississippi, a position which he held from 1992 to 1996. He was the first Republican to have held the office of lieutenant governor of Mississippi since Reconstruction.

== Early life ==
Eddie Briggs was born in Noxubee County, Mississippi and later moved to Kemper County. His father worked in forestry and his mother worked in a cafeteria. He attended East Mississippi Junior College on a football scholarship. He then obtained an undergraduate degree from Livingston College and a Juris Doctor degree from Mississippi College.

Briggs married a woman when he was 21 years old, later divorcing her. He then married Becky Harry.

== Political career ==
Briggs served two terms in the Mississippi State Senate as a Democrat. During that time he supported the creation of a four-lane highway program. He then switched to the Republican Party in 1991 and entered the Republican lieutenant gubernatorial primary. He won it unchallenged and faced incumbent Democrat Lieutenant Governor Brad Dye—who had survived a narrow primary—and black independent Henry J. Kirksey. Briggs characterized Dye as beholden to "the tired, old, worn politic of the past" and denounced him for failing to pass reform legislation. He also attacked him for refusing to release his tax returns, participate in a public debate, and for collecting the governor's salary while serving as acting governor whenever the incumbent was out of the state. Briggs ultimately won with 49.5 percent of the vote. Dye collected 41.5 percent, and Kirksey earned the remainder. The Mississippi constitution stipulated that a statewide race not won by outright majority was to be decided by a vote of the House. Dye encouraged the House to affirm Briggs' victory on the basis that he earned a plurality of the votes.

Briggs was sworn in before the State Legislature on January 9, 1992. Upon taking office, he declared that his priorities would be to secure term limits for state officials and institute a ballot initiative process. He made five of the nine Republicans in the Senate chairs of committees and ousted many senior leaders in his appointments.

As lieutenant governor, Briggs came into conflict with Republican incumbent Governor Kirk Fordice. Fordice was a businessman who had little value for the opinion of government officials and expected Briggs to follow his leadership. Briggs thought government experience was valuable and acted independently of him. He began to criticize the governor and at one point modified a gubernatorial proclamation while serving as acting governor while Fordice was traveling, earning a public rebuke from the governor. The Mississippi Republican Party chairman at one point arranged a meeting to broker a reconciliation between the two. Briggs convinced the legislature to schedule a referendum to limit the lieutenant governor to two terms, which was successfully passed in November 1992. He also supported tort reform legislation.

Briggs ran for second term as lieutenant governor in 1995, facing Democrat Ronnie Musgrove. Briggs refused to debate his opponent, and Musgrove accused him of hypocrisy for not releasing his tax returns when he had demanded the same of Dye four years prior. Briggs also distanced himself from Fordice's reelection campaign due to the differences between the two. He lost to Musgrove, taking only 48 percent of the vote. He left office on January 4, 1996.

Upon leaving office, Briggs purchased a Ford car dealership in Canton and involved himself in timber and real estate ventures. In late 1998 he announced he would enter the 1999 gubernatorial election, saying, "I promise we will not let anyone outwork us this time." He campaigned on reducing taxes, specifically the state sales tax on food. He faced several Republicans in the primary including Congressman Mike Parker. Parker won the primary and was then defeated by Musgrove. Briggs is currently an attorney in practice in Madison in central Mississippi.

=== 1995 ===
Mississippi Lt. Governor general election (1995)
Party	Candidate	Votes	%
Democratic	Ronnie Musgrove	405,629	52
Republican	Eddie Briggs (Incumbent)	368,699	48
Democratic gain from Republican			

Source: "Results at a Glance". Vicksburg Evening Post. November 8, 1995.

== Works cited ==
- Lamis, Alexander P., ed. (1999). Southern Politics in the 1990s. Louisiana State University Press. ISBN 9780807166765.
- Nash, Jere; Taggart, Andy (2009). Mississippi Politics: The Struggle for Power, 1976-2008 (second ed.). University Press of Mississippi. ISBN 9781604733570.

Party political offices
Preceded by	Republican nominee for Lieutenant Governor of Mississippi; 1991, 1995	Succeeded by Bill Hawks
Political offices
Preceded by Brad Dye	Lieutenant Governor of Mississippi; 1992–1996	Succeeded by Ronnie Musgrove
