= Andy Mullins =

Andy Mullins may refer to:

- Andy Mullins (actor)
- Andy Mullins (rugby union)
- Andy P. Mullins, American educator
