= 1992 United States elections =

- ← 1990 1991 1992 1993 1994 → Presidential election year
- Election day: November 3
- Incumbent president: ▌George H. W. Bush (R)
- Next Congress: 103rd

Presidential election
- Partisan control: Democratic gain
- Popular vote margin: Democratic +5.6%
- Electoral vote
- Bill Clinton (D): 370
- George H. W. Bush (R): 168
- 1992 presidential election results. Red denotes states won by Bush, blue denotes states won by Clinton. Numbers indicate the electoral votes won by each candidate.

Senate elections
- Overall control: Democratic hold
- Seats contested: 36 of 100 seats (34 Class 3 seats + 2 special elections)
- Net seat change: 0 (Note: Republicans picked up one seat in the regularly-scheduled elections, while Democrats picked up one seat in a special election.)
- 1992 Senate results Democratic gain Democratic hold Republican gain Republican hold

House elections
- Overall control: Democratic hold
- Seats contested: All 435 voting members
- Popular vote margin: Democratic +5%
- Net seat change: Republican +9
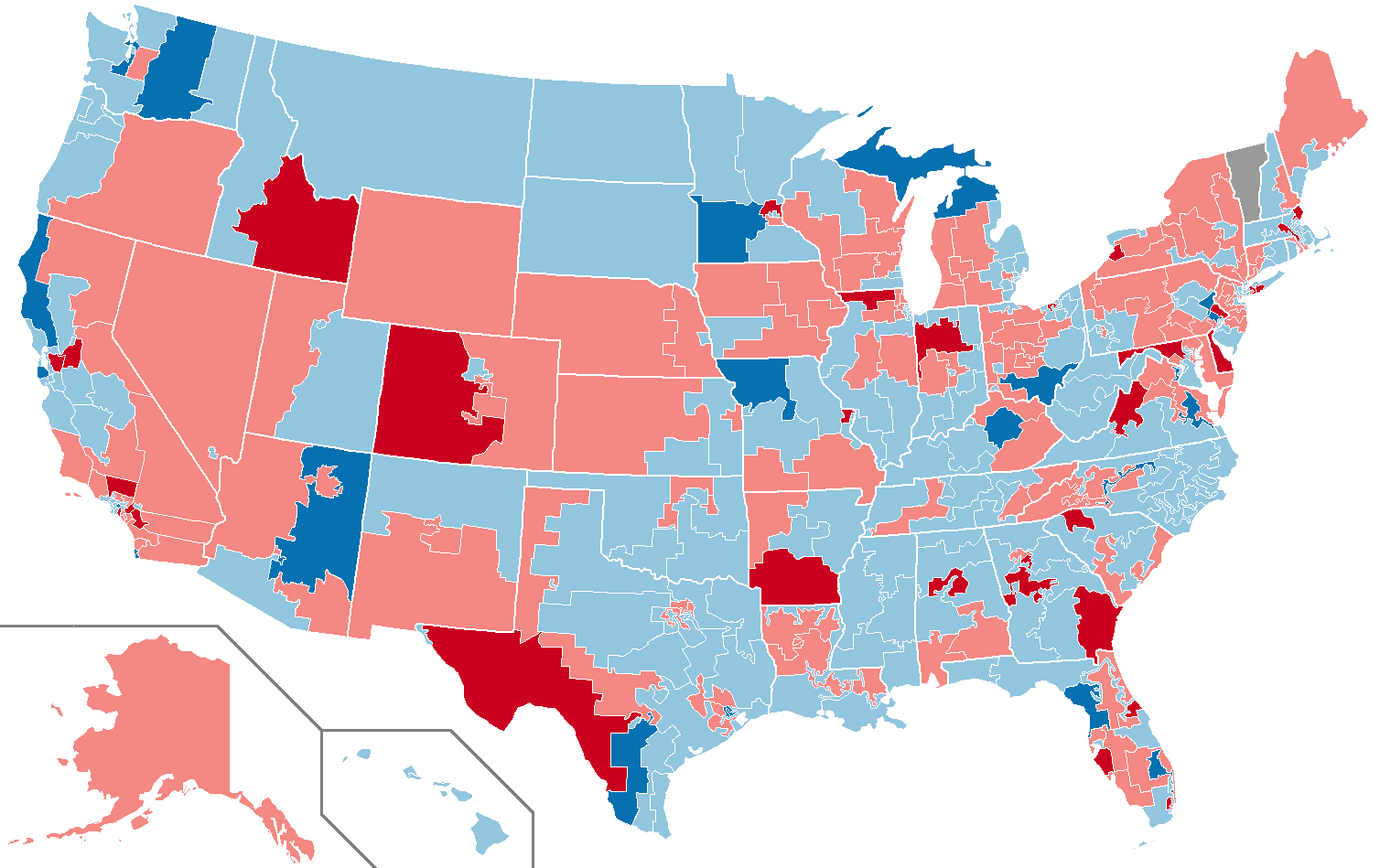
- 1992 House of Representatives results Democratic gain Democratic hold Republican gain Republican hold Independent hold

Gubernatorial elections
- Seats contested: 14 (12 states, 2 territories)
- Net seat change: Democratic +2
- 1992 gubernatorial election results Democratic gain Democratic hold Republican gain Republican hold New Progressive gain Nonpartisan

Elections were held in 1992, to elect state governors, the president of the United States, and members of the 103rd United States Congress. The elections took place after the Soviet Union crumbled and the Cold War ended, as well as the redistricting that resulted from the 1990 census. Often considered "The Year Of The Woman," these elections brought an increased number of female politicians to Washington such as Dianne Feinstein (D-CA), Barbara Boxer (D-CA), Patty Murray (D-WA), and Carol Moseley Braun (D-IL). Moseley Braun would also become the first African-American woman to ever serve a term in the Senate, which was historically predominantly white. Governor Bill Clinton of Arkansas defeated incumbent president George H. W. Bush and businessman Ross Perot in the presidential election. The Democratic Party maintained their control of both chambers of Congress.

In the presidential election, Democratic governor Bill Clinton of Arkansas defeated Republican incumbent president George H. W. Bush and Texas businessman Ross Perot. Clinton easily won the electoral college with 370 electoral votes, but took just 43 percent of the popular vote, the fourth-lowest share of any victorious presidential candidate. Perot's independent candidacy won the largest share of the popular vote of any third party or independent candidate since Theodore Roosevelt's 1912 candidacy. Clinton defeated former California governor Jerry Brown and former Massachusetts senator Paul Tsongas to take the Democratic nomination. Bush defeated a primary challenge from commentator, and former Reagan White House Director of Communications Pat Buchanan to earn re-nomination as the Republican candidate.

A small number of seats changed hands in the Senate, but Democrats retained a comfortable majority. Democrats won the national popular vote for the House of Representatives by a margin of five percentage points, but Republicans won a net gain of nine seats. In the gubernatorial elections, the Democratic Party won a net gain of two states. This is the first Democratic trifecta since the Republican victory in the 1980 elections, the last one in the 20th century, and the last one overall until 2008. It was also the second consecutive election cycle in which the winning presidential candidate did not have coattails in either house of Congress, and the last time where the Democratic candidate failed to have any coattails as of 2026.

== Issues ==
What was initially viewed as an easy win for the incumbent, George H. W. Bush, turned out quite differently. His famous "Read my lips: no new taxes" quip was used effectively by his primary challenger Pat Buchanan and later by Governor Bill Clinton. One of the first indicators of Bush's re-election challenge was a poll showing him losing to Texas billionaire Ross Perot in May.

== Federal elections ==
=== Presidential election ===
Bush had alienated many of the conservatives in his party by breaking his 1988 campaign pledge against raising taxes, but he fended off a primary challenge from conservative commentator Pat Buchanan. Bush's popularity after his success in the Gulf War dissuaded high-profile Democratic candidates like Mario Cuomo from entering the 1992 Democratic primaries. Clinton, a leader of the centrist Democratic Leadership Council, established himself as the front-runner for the Democratic nomination by sweeping the Super Tuesday primaries. He defeated former and future governor of California Jerry Brown, former Massachusetts senator Paul Tsongas, and other candidates to win his party's nomination, and chose Senator Al Gore as his running mate. Billionaire Ross Perot launched an independent campaign, emphasizing his opposition to the North American Free Trade Agreement and his plan to reduce the national debt.

The economy was in recession and Bush's greatest strength, foreign policy, was regarded as much less important following the dissolution of the Soviet Union and the end of the Cold War and the relatively peaceful climate in the Middle East after the Gulf War. Perot led in several polls taken in June 1992, but severely damaged his candidacy by temporarily dropping out of the race in July. The Bush campaign criticized Clinton's character and emphasized Bush's foreign policy successes, while Clinton focused on the economy.

Clinton won a plurality in the popular vote and a majority of the electoral vote, breaking a streak of three straight Republican victories. Clinton swept the Northeastern United States, marking the start of Democratic dominance in the region in presidential elections, while also performing well in the Midwest and the West. Along with Jimmy Carter, Donald Trump and Gerald Ford, Bush is one of four incumbent presidents since World War II to be defeated in the general election. Perot won 18.9% of the popular vote, the highest share of the vote won by a candidate outside of the two major parties since 1912. Although he failed to win any electoral votes, Perot found support in every state, and Clinton's home state of Arkansas was the lone state to give a majority of its vote to any candidate.

=== Senate elections ===
The 34 Seats in the Senate Class III were up for election. Democratic victories over Republicans John F. Seymour (in the special California race) and Bob Kasten (of Wisconsin) were cancelled out by the defeats of Democrats Wyche Fowler (of Georgia) and Terry Sanford (of North Carolina). The election of four new Democratic women to the Senate was notable (referred to in the press as the "Year of the Woman"). California became the first state to have elected women to occupy both of its Senate seats due to the victories of Dianne Feinstein and Barbara Boxer. Democrat Carol Moseley Braun (of Illinois), became the first African-American woman in the United States Senate.

=== House of Representatives elections ===
Though they won the national popular vote for the House of Representatives by a margin of five percentage points, Democrats lost a net of nine seats in the House to the Republicans, in part due to redistricting following the 1990 census. The redrawn districts were notable for the increase in majority-minority districts, drawn as mandated by the Voting Rights Act. While the redistricting after the 1980 census had resulted in 17 majority-black districts and 10 majority-Hispanic districts, 32 and 19 such districts, respectively, were drawn after the 1990 census.

== State elections ==
Democrats and Republicans each defended gubernatorial positions in six states in 1992. Democrats won a net gain of two gubernatorial seats in the 1992 elections.
