= United States Endowment for Forestry and Communities =

The U.S. Endowment for Forestry & Communities, Inc. is a nonprofit organization established at the request of the governments of the United States and Canada in accordance with the terms of the Softwood Lumber Agreement 2006 (SLA) between the two countries. The Endowment is one of three entities designated to share in a one-time infusion of funds to support "meritorious initiatives" in the U.S. It has been endowed with $200 million under the terms of the SLA.

The Endowment has been chartered with two purposes: 1) educational and charitable causes in timber-reliant communities; and 2) educational and public-interest projects addressing forest management issues that affect timber-reliant communities, or the sustainability of forests as sources of building materials, wildlife habitat, bio-energy, recreation, and other values.

The Endowment’s vision is that America’s forests are sustainably managed to meet broad societal objectives such as marketable products, clean waters, wildlife habitats and other ecological services, while ensuring healthy and vibrant forest-reliant communities. To achieve this vision, the Endowment operates with a mission to, work collaboratively with partners in the public and private sectors to advance systemic, transformative and sustainable change for the health and vitality of the nation’s working forests and forest-reliant communities.
