= 1996 United States elections =

- ← 1994 1995 1996 1997 1998 → Presidential election year
- Election day: November 5
- Incumbent president: ▌Bill Clinton (D)
- Next Congress: 105th

Presidential election
- Partisan control: Democratic hold
- Popular vote margin: Democratic +8.5%
- Electoral vote
- Bill Clinton (D): 379
- Bob Dole (R): 159
- 1996 presidential election results. Red denotes states won by Dole, blue denotes states won by Clinton. Numbers indicate the electoral votes won by each candidate.

Senate elections
- Overall control: Republican hold
- Seats contested: 35 of 100 seats (33 Class 2 seats + 2 special elections)
- Net seat change: Republican +2
- 1996 Senate results (excluding Oregon's Senate special election) Democratic gain Democratic hold Republican gain Republican hold

House elections
- Overall control: Republican hold
- Seats contested: All 435 voting members
- Popular vote margin: Democratic +0.1%
- Net seat change: Democratic +3
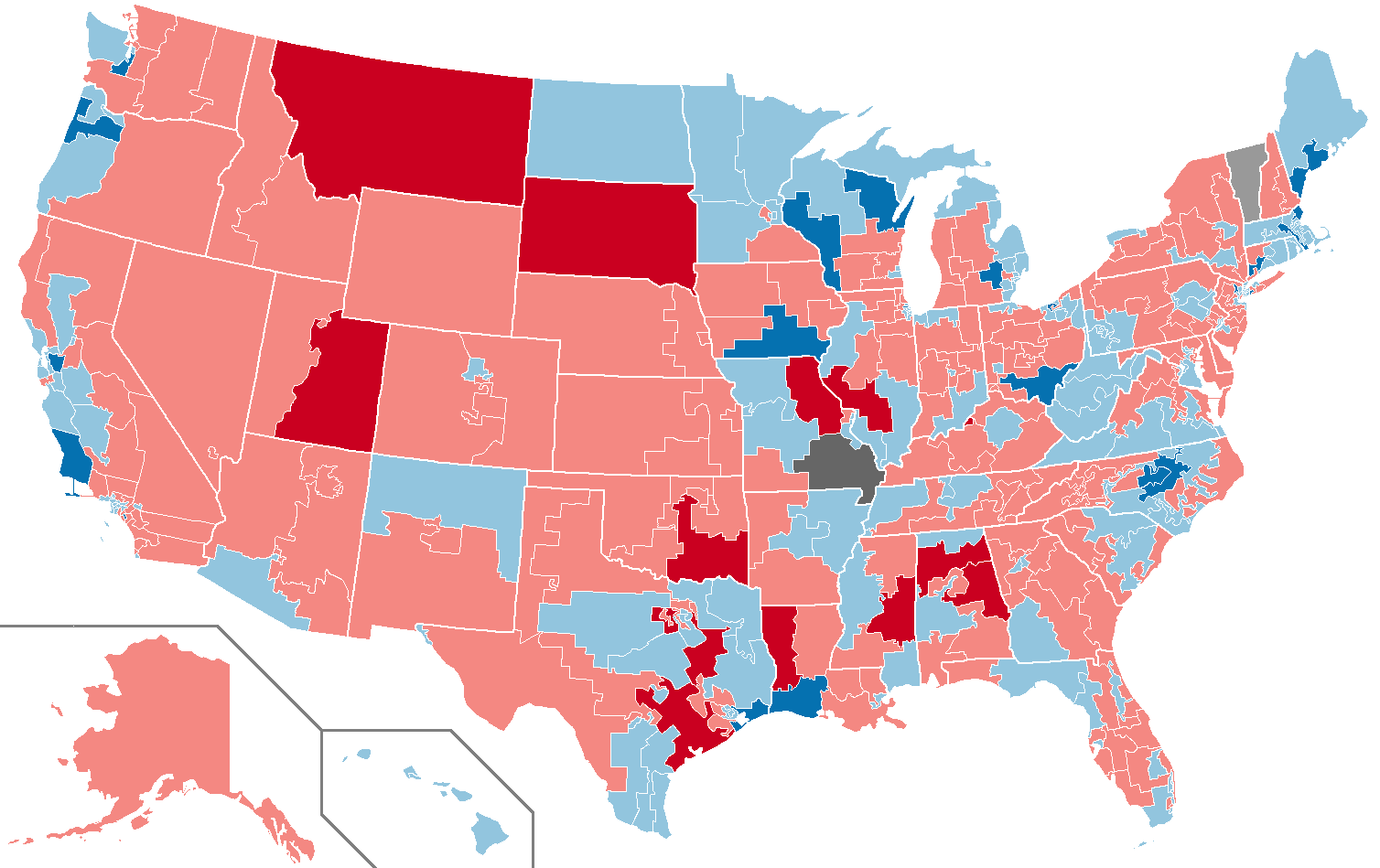
- 1996 House of Representatives results (territorial delegate races not shown) Democratic hold Republican hold Democratic gain Republican gain Independent gain Independent hold

Gubernatorial elections
- Seats contested: 13 (11 states, 2 territories)
- Net seat change: None
- 1996 gubernatorial election results Democratic gain Democratic hold Republican gain Republican hold New Progressive hold Nonpartisan

Elections were held on November 5, 1996. Democratic President Bill Clinton won re-election, while the Republicans maintained their majorities in both houses of the United States Congress.

Clinton defeated Republican nominee Bob Dole and independent candidate Ross Perot in the presidential election, taking 379 of the 538 electoral votes improving over his 1992 victory by nine electors. Due in part to Perot's fairly strong third party performance (despite being considerably worse than in 1992), Clinton narrowly failed to win a majority of the popular vote. Dole defeated Pat Buchanan and several other candidates in the 1996 Republican Party presidential primaries to win his party's nomination for president.

In the congressional elections, Republicans successfully defended the majorities that they had won in the 1994 elections. Republicans picked up a net of two Senate seats, while Democrats picked up a net of three seats in the House of Representatives. In the gubernatorial elections, each party picked up a single seat that had previously been held by the other party.

As of 2024, this is the last time a president was elected with both chambers of Congress being of the opposing party.

== Federal elections ==
=== Presidential election ===
Democratic incumbent President Bill Clinton won re-election, defeating Republican former Senator Bob Dole of Kansas. Billionaire and 1992 independent presidential candidate Ross Perot of Texas, the nominee of the newly founded Reform Party, though performing strongly for a third party candidate and receiving 8.4% of the vote, was unable to replicate his 1992 performance.

=== Congressional elections ===
==== Senate elections ====
During the 1996 U.S. Senate elections, elections for all thirty-three regularly scheduled Class II Senate seats as well as special elections in Oregon and Kansas were held.

Republicans captured three seats in Alabama, Arkansas, and Nebraska, but lost two in Oregon (via a special election not held concurrently with the other Senate elections in November) and South Dakota.

==== House of Representatives elections ====
During the 1996 House elections, all 435 seats in the House of Representatives as well as the seats of all non-voting Delegates from territories and the District of Columbia were up for election that year.

Democrats won the national popular vote for the House of Representatives by a margin of 0.1 percentage points and won a net gain of eight seats. Nonetheless, Republicans retained control of the chamber.

In addition to all regularly scheduled House elections, there were five special elections held. They were held to fill vacancies for California's 37th congressional district (on March 26), Maryland's 7th congressional district (April 16), Oregon's 3rd congressional district (May 21), Kansas's 2nd congressional district, and Missouri's 8th congressional district (both on November 5).

== State elections ==
=== Gubernatorial elections ===
During the 1996 gubernatorial elections, the governorships of the eleven states and two territories were up for election.

Going into the elections, Republicans held the governorships of thirty-two states, Democrats held those of seventeen states, all territories, and the Mayorship of the District of Columbia, and one Governor was a member of neither party. Republicans won in West Virginia, but this was countered by a Democratic victory in New Hampshire. Thus, there was no net change in the balance of power.

=== Other statewide elections ===
In some states where the positions were elective offices, voters elected candidates for state executive branch offices. These include lieutenant governors (though some were elected on the same ticket as the gubernatorial nominee), secretaries of state, state treasurers, state auditors, state attorneys general, state superintendents of education, commissioners of insurance, agriculture, or labor, and state judicial branch offices (seats on state supreme courts and, in some states, state appellate courts).
