= Dick Molpus =

American politician

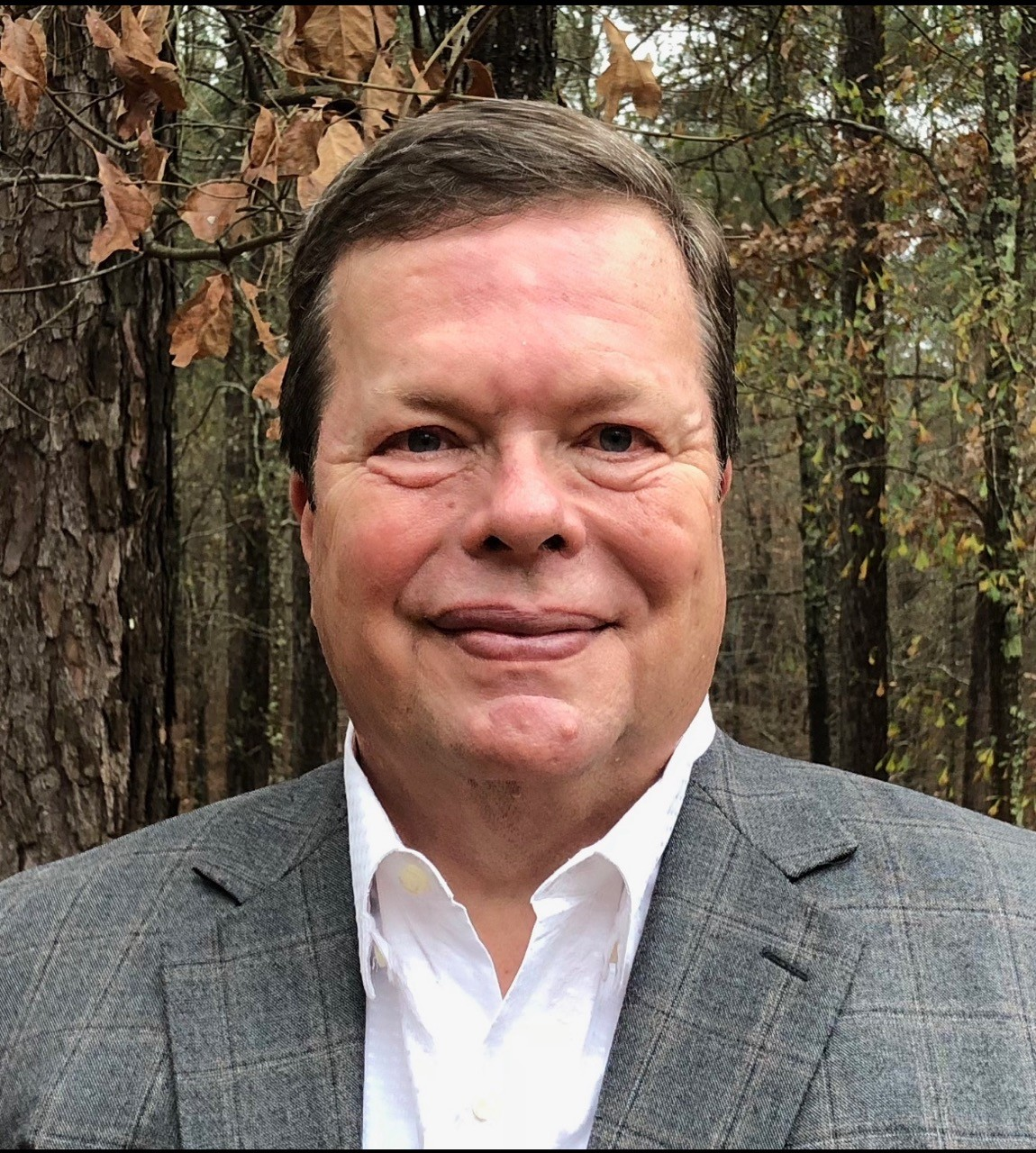
- Molpus in 2025

33rd Secretary of State of Mississippi
- In office January 5, 1984 – January 4, 1996
- Governor: Bill Allain; Ray Mabus; Kirk Fordice
- Preceded by: Ed Pittman
- Succeeded by: Eric Clark

Personal details
- Born: Richard Henderson Molpus Jr. September 7, 1949 (age 77) Philadelphia, Mississippi, U.S.
- Party: Democratic
- Spouse: Sally Galbraith Nash
- Education: University of Mississippi (BBA)

Richard Henderson Molpus Jr. (born September 7, 1949) is an American businessman and Democratic Party politician who served as Secretary of State of Mississippi from 1984 until 1996. He unsuccessfully ran for governor in 1995 against Republican incumbent Kirk Fordice. He later established a timberland management company. Throughout his public life he has pushed for reforms to support public education and promote racial reconciliation.

Born in Philadelphia, Mississippi, and educated at the University of Mississippi, Molpus worked at his family's lumber company before its sale in the 1980s. A staffer for William F. Winter's gubernatorial campaigns in 1967, 1975, and 1979, the governor appointed him executive director of the Governor's Office of Federal-State Programs. He also lobbied on the governor's behalf for education reform in the state legislature.

Molpus successfully ran for secretary of state in 1983, campaigning on his managerial experience and promises to reform the office. Reelected in 1987 and 1991, he reorganized the office through the creation of four departments and shifted its purpose away from clerical duties and towards more active policy engagement. He oversaw the digitization of the office's records, the renegotiation of thousands of leases on public lands to raise money for public education, reformed the state's election laws, and sought reforms in corporate law and lobbying rules. Molpus unsuccessfully ran for U.S. Senate in 1988, losing the Democratic nomination to Wayne Dowdy and accruing the third highest campaign debt for any senatorial candidate nationwide. In his unsuccessful campaign for governor in 1995, his apology for the Mississippi Burning murders, the first by a statewide office holder, was used against him. He started a timberland investment management organization in 1996 and was appointed to the United States Endowment for Forestry and Communities in 2006.

== Early life and education ==
Richard Henderson Molpus Jr. was born in Philadelphia, Mississippi, on September 7, 1949, to Richard Henderson Molpus Sr. and Frances Blount. He graduated from Philadelphia High School in 1967, and from the University of Mississippi with a Bachelor of Business Administration degree in 1971. While there he served as president of the Sigma Chi fraternity chapter, and unsuccessfully pushed for the fraternity to racially integrate. He married Sally Galbraith Nash, with whom he had two children, in 1971.

His grandfather, Richard Hezekiah Molpus, established the first sawmill in Philadelphia in 1905 as part of a general merchandise venture, the Henderson-Molpus Company. The corporation later transformed into the Molpus Lumber Company in 1957, focusing its business in wood, and passed to Dick's father. Molpus began working for the company at a young age. By the time he was a teenager, he was a certified lumber inspector. He returned to work for the company after graduating from college, assuming temporary control after his father suffered a stroke. He rose to the position of vice president for manufacturing and oversaw the establishment of a second lumber facility in Morton in 1975. The lumber company was sold in the mid-1980s. Molpus served on the board of directors and executive committee of the Mississippi Forestry Association, vice-president of the Mississippi Lumber Manufacturers Association, and on the board of directors of the Morton chamber of commerce.

== Political career ==
=== Early activities and Winter administration ===
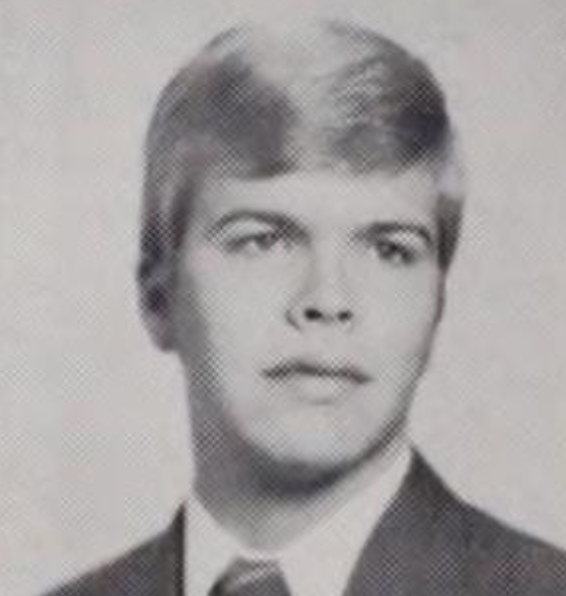
Molpus as a university student, 1970

During the 1967 Mississippi gubernatorial election, Molpus worked as a youth coordinator in Neshoba County for Democrat William F. Winter's unsuccessful campaign. He co-chaired a blue ribbon highway study committee during Governor Bill Waller's tenure. He volunteered for Winter's 1975 campaign and for his successful 1979 gubernatorial campaign. His father was one of Winter's leading supporters during the 1967 and 1975 elections, but later supported Republican nominee Gil Carmichael in the 1975 election and Jim Herring in the 1979 Democratic primary. Molpus was Winter's first announced appointee when he was selected as executive director of the Governor's Office of Federal-State Programs, on November 15, 1979. The office coordinated actions between federal and state agencies.

Together with the state director of administration, Molpus consolidated the office's 17 agencies into seven, reducing administrative expenses by 25%. For his work in reducing staff and improving the agency's efficiency, he was selected in 1983 as Mississippi's Public Administrator of the Year by the American Society for Public Administration. He also helped Winter lobby the Mississippi State Legislature to pass the 1982 Education Reform Act, hosting the governor's staff at a cabin he owned for strategy sessions, delivering over 35 speeches to build public support for the bill, and organizing a phone call campaign to pressure a state senator to support the creation of public kindergartens. State Senator Ellis B. Bodron, who was broadly opposed to the legislation, denounced Molpus and other young Winter aides—including Ray Mabus, David Crews, Bill Gartin, Andy P. Mullins, and John Henegan—as the "Boys of Spring", a moniker in which they thereafter took pride.

=== Secretary of State of Mississippi ===
==== Elections ====
Winter's tenure sparked a decade of political interest in reforming state government and led to like-minded candidates—many being former members of his administration—to seek elective office. Mississippi Secretary of State Edwin L. Pittman announced that he would run in the 1983 gubernatorial election. Molpus was considered a candidate to succeed Pittman and he considered running for either secretary of state or public service commissioner from the Central District. Molpus announced his resignation from Winter's administration effective May 9, and launched his campaign for secretary of state on May 16, 1983. He was the second member of Winter's staff to run for statewide office after Mabus announced his campaign for state auditor. During the campaign he was endorsed by the National Women's Political Caucus and AFL–CIO. Pledging to reorganize the office, he won the Democratic nomination after defeating John Ed Ainsworth in a runoff. Molpus and Ainsworth did not engage in negative campaigning, stating that they had a mutual respect for each other. In the general election he defeated Republican legislator Jerry Gilbreath after he campaigned on his managerial experience and record of helping Winter's education reforms succeed.

Molpus announced that he would seek reelection on May 5, 1987, and won in the election. In 1989, he announced that he would run for reelection in the 1991 election and was considering running in the 1995 gubernatorial election. He announced his campaign on January 11, 1991, and facing no opposition in the primary or general elections was elected unopposed.

==== Tenure ====
Before taking office Molpus announced a reorganization plan for the office in which he would create four new departments to handle administration, public lands and elections, policy development, and securities regulations. He wanted to shift the focus of the secretary of state from clerical and administrative duties to handling education, public lands, securities, and elections. Molpus assumed office on January 5, 1984. The director of the Mississippi NAACP criticized Molpus, among other state officials, for the low number of black people he appointed to office despite having significant black electoral support in the 1983 election.

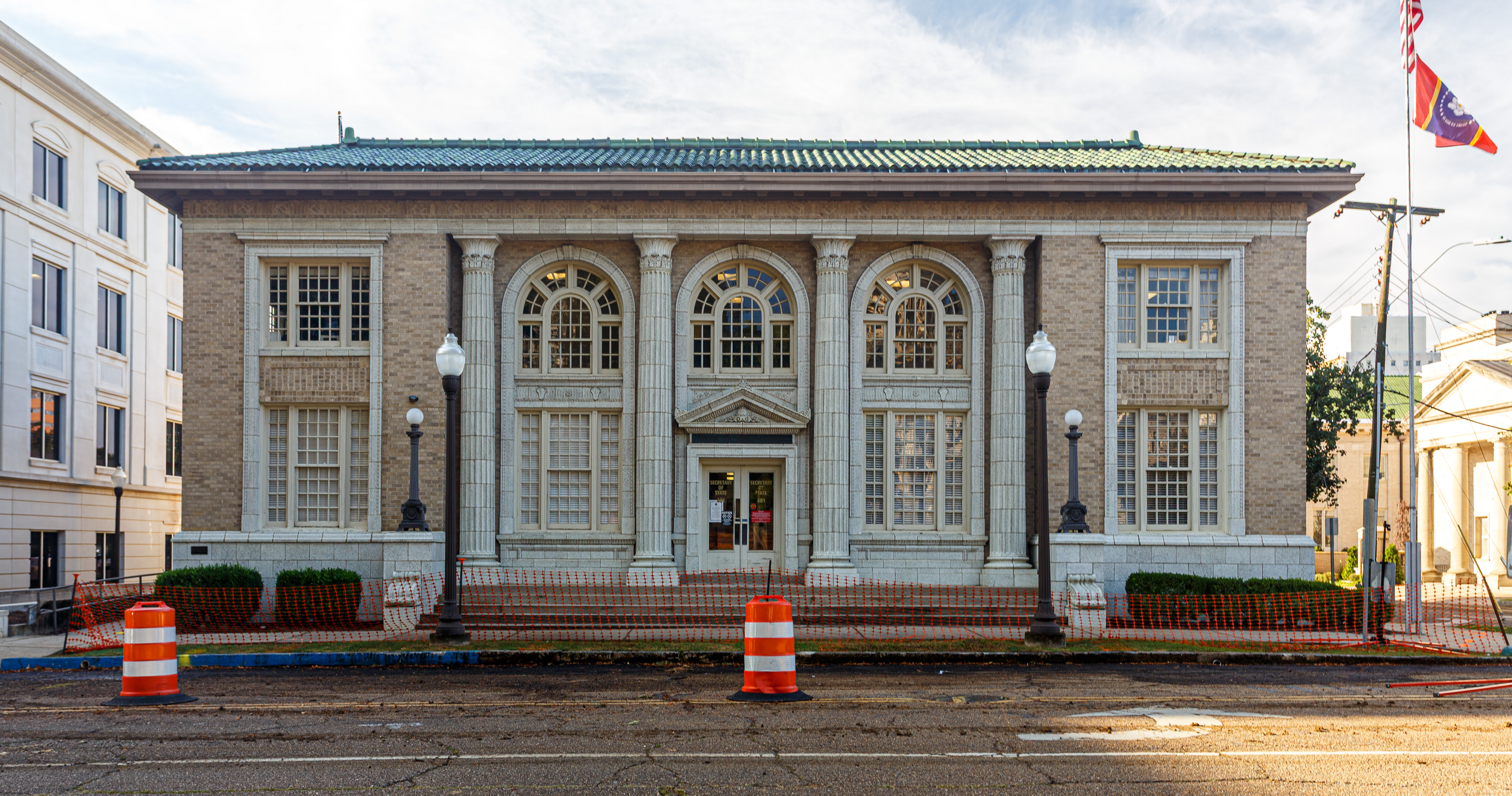
Heber Ladner Building, home to Mississippi's Secretary of State

In 1989 The Neshoba Democrat editor Stanley Dearman invited Molpus to partake in a commemoration of the 25th anniversary of the Mississippi Burning murders of three civil rights activists in Philadelphia, Mississippi, an event which had stigmatized the town to outsiders and was regarded as politically controversial. Despite concerns from some of his advisers that his involvement in a commemoration would ruin his political career, Molpus agreed to attend and helped to organize a planning committee for the event. He also convinced Governor Mabus to attend with him. On June 21, 1989, Molpus officially apologized to the families of the murdered civil rights workers, saying, "We deeply regret what happened here 25 years ago. We wish we could undo it. We wish we could bring them back. Every decent person here feels that way. My heart is full because today we have found a way to ease the burden that this community has borne." The statement made him the first Mississippi state official to apologize for the murders.

Dearman summarized the public reaction to the speech, saying, "A lot of people were opposed to it, but a lot of people were glad he said it." Many white Mississippians disagreed with Molpus' remarks; he received several critical letters and threatening phone calls in response, including 26 death threats. Some Mississippians credited Molpus with restarting public discussion of the murders and their significance in the state. Reflecting on his statements and their impact on his political prospects in 2021, Molpus said, "It was not a mistake to say those words. Things are more important than winning. Governors come and go, but those words are something I still feel good about."

Molpus supported Steve Patterson's bid for the chairmanship of the Mississippi Democratic Party in 1984. He endorsed Mike Espy during his campaign for a seat in the United States House of Representatives during the 1986 election and Epsy's victory made him the first black person to represent Mississippi in the United States Congress since the Reconstruction era. He endorsed Bill Clinton during the 1992 Democratic presidential primaries and was a delegate to the Democratic National Convention. After several potential candidates declined to serve, Molpus acted as the Mississippi delegation's secretary.

Molpus and 41 others founded a Mississippi chapter of the Democratic Leadership Council in 1990. He was elected to the board of officers of the National Association of Secretaries of State, being the only Southerner on the board and became its secretary in 1987, its treasurer in 1988, its vice-president in 1989, and was selected as its president in 1993. He was succeeded by Eric Clark at the secretariat of state on January 4, 1996.

===== Commerce =====
The secretary of state was responsible for administering the Mississippi Business Corporation Law and the Uniform Commercial Code, overseeing public lands and elections, and issuing publications on behalf of the state's executive offices and legislature. At that time, the office required $200,000 per year from the state treasury to remain operational. Molpus convinced the legislature to raise the office's filing and brokerage fees to the Southeastern average rates in 1985, switching the office's source of money from the state general fund to a special self-generated fund. Despite this change, that year the office required a subsidy of over $70,000 from the general fund to operate. Molpus also oversaw a $4 million effort in automating the office's processes with technology and digitizing its records. Combined with an uptick in corporate registrations in Mississippi, by the end of the 1992 fiscal year these measures allowed the office to collect enough money to be self-funded and deposit $1.1 million in surplus into the state treasury. Molpus also appointed a 29-person Business Law Reform Task Force in 1986 to lobby for revisions of laws pertaining to corporations, nonprofit organizations, limited parties, and securities. Several reforms were adopted by the legislature in 1987. For his efforts to reorganize the secretary of state's office, in 1985 Molpus received the American Society for Public Administration's Elected Official of the Year Award.

The secretary of state was ex offico the Lands Commissioner of Mississippi and thus supervised more than 600,000 acres (2,400 km^{2}) of 16th Section Land that had been set aside in the early 19th century to raise money for the public schools. In the 1980s much of the property was being leased to private entities for cents an acre under 99-year contracts. The state Reform Act of 1978 stipulated that 16th Section Lands be leased at fair market values. In 1984, Molpus began enforcing the act in order to aid education funding, thus triggering the renegotiation of about 5,000 below-market leases and increasing the amount of revenue to the public schools from those properties during his tenure by $24 million (equivalent to $49,267,982 in 2025). He conducted the first price inventory of the 9,561 leases of the 16th Section Lands in the state's history and found that less than 15% of the land was being leased for more than $20 per acre while almost half were being leased for less than 50¢ per acre and one-third were being leased for less than 20¢ per acre. The revenue from the leases rose by 28% from $6.9 million in 1983 to $8.9 million in 1985.

Molpus faced opposition from the leaseholders. Some of them demanded that the Mississippi Ethics Commission investigate Molpus, claiming that he was reclassifying the land into forest land to benefit his family's lumber business, although his family had sold the business in December 1983, before he took office. Steve Turney, whose land lease rose from 25¢ per acre to around $7 per acre, was one of the opponents. The ethics complaint filed by Turney and 56 others was dismissed by a unanimous vote. Turney filed a lawsuit against Molpus in July 1985, claiming that he was "neglecting his duty with advocating five percent of market value". He withdrew the lawsuit a few months later due to a jurisdictional error. He later requested that the state attorney general pursue action against Molpus before filing a new lawsuit against Molpus in November, claiming that the secretary of state was using his position to make financial gains through the land reclassification, but he lost and the judge ordered him to pay for the expenses of the lawsuit. The Supreme Court of Mississippi ruled on November 27, affirming the raise in Turney's lease. Turney camped outside of Molpus' office for 23 days in 1986 to protest the changes and ran against him in the 1987 Democratic primary.

===== Education =====
As secretary of state, Molpus held a seat on the Mississippi Board of Education. Molpus and Governor William Allain called for the creation of an education trust fund as revenue meant to implement the Education Reform Act was instead being used by the state legislature to prevent budget deficits. Their proposal was opposed by Speaker Buddie Newman and Sonny Meredith, the chair of the House Ways and Means committee. He co-founded Parents for Public Schools, a group which sought to promote the improvement of public schools, in 1989. Initially confined to a group of largely white-middle-class parents in Jackson, Mississippi who sought to support the local school district, by 1997 it had expanded to 50 chapters scattered across the United States.

===== Electoral matters =====
Governor Allain, Attorney General Pittman, and Molpus were ex officio the three members of Mississippi Election Commission. He proposed election reforms which would eliminate the dual voter registration law that required voters to register at the city and county levels, allow circuit clerks to accept voter registration outside of county courthouses, and end runoff elections. He oversaw the 1984 presidential election in the state which was the first time that voters directly voted for the presidential candidates rather than their electors. Molpus successfully pushed for the legislature to reform lobbyist laws to require lobbyists to report all money spent on public officials.

Molpus announced a twenty-five member task force on June 19, 1984, to review Mississippi's election laws and recommend improvements. The task force made recommendations that included the at-large election of municipal officials, requiring the usage of electronic voting systems, having a statewide voter registration list compiled by the secretary of state, simplifying the wording for constitution amendment referendums, and requiring political action committees to submit financials reports for state and local elections. At the time forty-nine counties still used paper ballots and would save $473,000 per year by changing to electronic voting. There was also no statewide voter registration list with each county reporting its number of voters which produced figures that were not up-to-date.

Legislation encompassing some of the proposals was passed in 1986, including the extension of voting hours, reduction of the minimum number of poll workers, standardization of prohibited campaign areas, constitutional amendment summaries on ballots, requiring the usage of automated devices to count ballots by counties before 1989, the denial of the right to vote for felons, increasing the number of election commissioners, repealing anti-single shot voting legislation, and other provisions. It was approved by the United States Department of Justice, as required by the Voting Rights Act of 1965, on January 2, 1987. He also supported the revival of state ballot initiatives in 1992.

=== 1988 U.S. Senate campaign ===
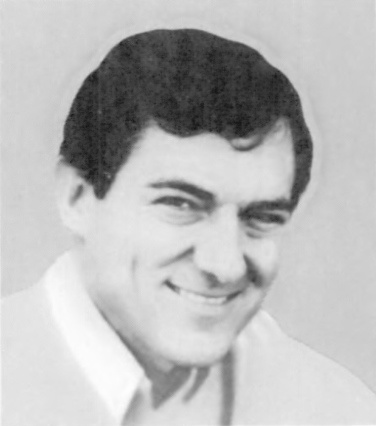
Representative Wayne Dowdy defeated Molpus for the Democratic senatorial nomination in the 1988 election.

Molpus stated in 1987, that he would consider running in the 1988 U.S. Senate election, if John C. Stennis chose not to seek reelection, and campaign correspondence in October showed his interest in running. Stennis stated that he would not run for reelection in the 1988 election. Molpus announced his campaign for the Democratic senatorial nomination on December 1, 1987, with Crews, who worked as Winter's press secretary, as his campaign manager. He was criticized for running for another office as he was reelected in 1987. He faced U.S. Representative Wayne Dowdy in the primary. Both men stressed the need for better educational opportunities and economic development. Dowdy won the Democratic nomination. During the campaign he criticized Dowdy for his low voting attendance of 68 percent, a line of rhetoric which was later used by Republican nominee Trent Lott in the general election. Molpus ended his campaign with the third highest debt for any 1988 senatorial candidate in the country at $356,700 (equivalent to $971,039 in 2025). His outstanding campaign debt and obligations was $439,776 in 1989.

=== 1995 gubernatorial campaign ===
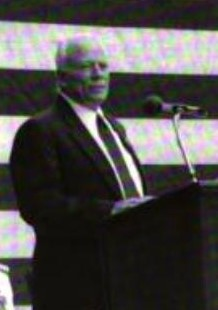
Molpus ran against Kirk Fordice (pictured) in the 1995 gubernatorial election.

In 1995, Molpus ran for the office of Governor of Mississippi. Easily winning the August 8 Democratic primary over evangelist Shawn O'Hara with 77.1 percent of the vote, he faced Republican incumbent Kirk Fordice in the general election. Molpus sought to prevail with a coalition of blacks, white progressives, and possibly white blue collar workers. By the 1990s, Mississippi's politics were trending in an increasingly conservative direction and the interest in reform initiated by Winter's administration was fading. Fordice's position was bolstered by the improving economic and fiscal situation of the state in the 1990s, and early polls indicated that he had a large lead. Since both men faced minimal opposition for their party's nominations, they were able to concentrate their rhetoric on each other early in their campaigns. Anticipating that Molpus would campaign on education improvements, Fordice proposed a conservative education plan which entailed allowing local school districts to fund private schools with state funds. Molpus argued that such a scheme would undermine public schools.

During the election, Molpus campaigned for reductions in sales tax on food and government expenditure while proposing the issuing of bonds to finance economic development. Fordice characterized Molpus' tax plans as inconsistent, given his earlier support for a sales tax increase in 1992. The campaign was marked by personal animosity between the candidates. Fordice portrayed statements from Molpus on the governor's policies as veiled attacks on Fordice's troubled marriage and claimed that as the Secretary of State was responsible for overseeing elections, Malpus should resign due to a conflict of interest. Malpus rejected the accusation of making personal attacks and refused to resign, calling the suggestion "ridiculous".

Results of the 1995 Mississippi gubernatorial election by county Molpus—50-60% Molpus—60-70% Molpus—70-80% Molpus—80-90%

Both men participated in the first-ever political debate held at the Neshoba County Fair in August. A bitter exchange occurred after the moderator questioned Fordice about his troubled marriage, with Fordice answering in defense of himself while pointing his finger at Molpus. Molpus said to the governor, "Your private life doesn't interest me ... Your public life is what appalls me," causing the crowd to go into uproar. In reference to the 1964 Mississippi Burning murders, Fordice said, "I'll tell you this. I don't believe we need to keep running this state by Mississippi Burning and apologizing for what happened 30 years ago. This is the '90s. This is now. We are on a roll. We've got the best race relations in the United States of America." He finished his remarks by saying, "Never apologize! Never look back! Forward together!" Molpus responded by referring to his 1989 speech, "I apologized to the family, the mother and father and sisters of those three young men who lost their life in Mississippi. I make no apologies to you about that... Kirk Fordice leads more by venom than vision." In a subsequent interview, he accused the governor of being "openly antagonistic to blacks."

In October Molpus' campaign ran a television advertisement featuring his wife criticizing Fordice's education policies. Fordice subsequently mocked her voice at a lunch with journalists. Molpus denounced Fordice's mimicry, saying "Frankly, I'd like to take him out behind the woodshed." Several days later, Fordice approached Molpus after a televised appearance and told him, "This 61-year-old man will take you to the woodshed and I'll whip your ass". Molpus hoped to leverage the incident to his advantage by appealing to more women voters, presenting himself as a gentlemen acting in defense of his wife's honor. A poll conducted by Mason-Dixon Political/Media Research in late October showed the margins of support between the two candidates narrowing, with Molpus having picked up additional support from women.

Molpus lost the November 7 election to Fordice, who earned 455,261 votes (55.6 percent). Molpus earned only 364,210 votes (44.4 percent), though he received about 25,000 more votes than Democrat Mabus had in 1991. He garnered less than 20 percent of the white vote while Fordice won fifty-one of the fifty-eight majority white counties, but won twenty-one of the state's twenty-four majority black counties. Some observers suggested that white voters wanted to "punish" him for his 1989 comments on the Mississippi Burning murders. Molpus' supporters accused Fordice of prevailing due to the use of racist dog whistles.

== Business career and later life ==
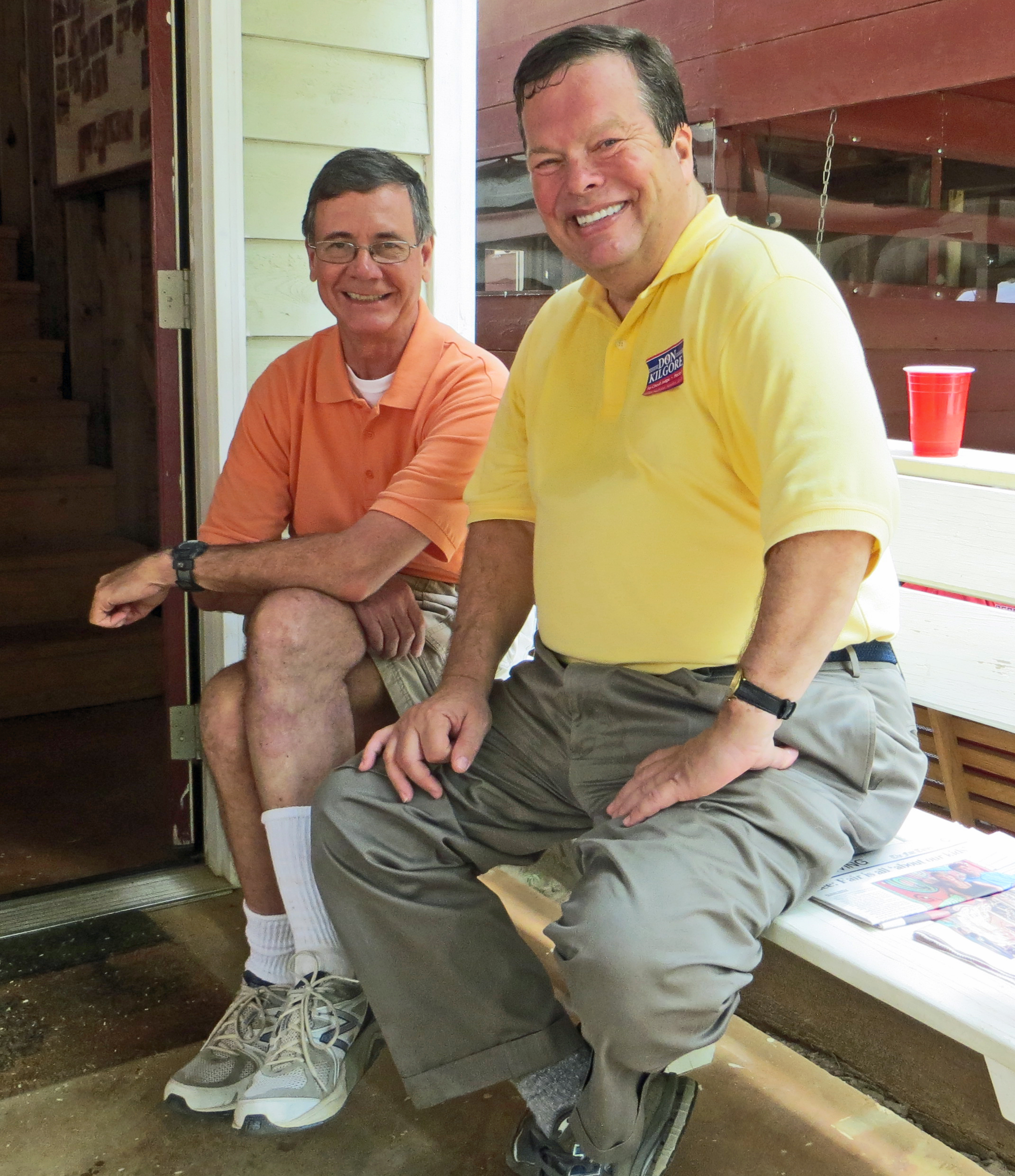
Molpus (right) at the Neshoba County Fair in 2015

In 1993 Molpus, having already planned to run for governor in 1995, considered pursuing a career in timberland investment management in the event his political ambitions faltered. Following his loss in the gubernatorial race, in 1996 he took out a loan and established the Molpus Woodlands Group (MWG). At the time, it was one of eight timberland investment management organizations in the country. The corporation was to operate by purchasing and managing timberlands on behalf of investors. The company acquired its first client the following year and purchased several thousand acres of timberland. Between 1998 and 2000, MWG acquired 545,000 acres in Mississippi, Alabama, Tennessee, Louisiana and Texas. The following year it signed its first contracts with large corporate clients, and by 2004 it was the largest timberland investment management organization in the Southern United States. In 2016 Molpus was made chairman of a trade industry organization, the National Alliance of Forest Owners.

In 2004 Molpus helped create the Philadelphia Coalition, an interracial group designed to promote racial justice. That year he also helped organize the 50th anniversary commemoration of the Mississippi Burning murders, and spoke in favor of state and local efforts to reexamine and prosecute the case. The following year, he was inducted into the Mississippi Business Hall of Fame. In 2006 he co-chaired a bond issue campaign for the Jackson Public School District. That year President George W. Bush appointed Molpus chairman of the board of the United States Endowment for Forestry and Communities, a nonprofit created under the terms of the Softwood Lumber Agreement between the United States and Canada designed to promote sustainable forestry and to promote economic development in timber-reliant communities. He was declared one of the Mississippi Center for Justice's "Champions of Justice" in 2008. In 2012, he called for Attorney General Eric Holder to block Mississippi's new voter ID law stating that it violated the Voting Rights Act.

During the February 20, 2013 episode of the satirical news television program The Daily Show, host Jon Stewart satirized Mississippi for failing to fully ratify the 13th Amendment to the U.S. Constitution officially banning slavery until that year. An earlier attempt to ratify the amendment was made in 1995, but the ratification papers—for which the Mississippi Secretary of State was responsible—were never received by the federal government. Molpus maintained that his office had sent copies of the documents to the Congressional Record and U.S. Senate leaders and "somewhere in between there and Archives, it disappeared." Stewart mockingly suggested that Molpus had deliberately forestalled the process by destroying the papers. Molpus was shocked by the insinuation, and received numerous emails and phone calls from associates who felt he had been portrayed unfairly. Some people posted defenses of Molpus on the internet. Stewart apologized for the joke the following week, saying his show had erred in using "Dick Molpus ... as an avatar for racial bigotry, forgetting, perhaps that Dick Molpus is a real person with a real record on civil rights" and praised him for having "a long and distinguished record of speaking out for civil rights in Mississippi." Molpus said, "I accept his apology ... I was so lifted up by the people of Mississippi that kind of rose to my defense."

Molpus supported Doug Jones in Alabama's 2017 U.S. Senate special election, stating that he was a "Southern hero".

== Works cited ==
- Ball, Howard (2006). Justice in Mississippi: The Murder Trial of Edgar Ray Killen. University Press of Kansas. ISBN 9780700614615.
- Bolton, Charles C. (2013). William F. Winter and the New Mississippi: A Biography. Jackson: University Press of Mississippi. ISBN 978-1-61703-787-0.
- Dement, Polly (2014). Mississippi Entrepreneurs. University Press of Mississippi. ISBN 9781626741232.
- The Federal-State-Local Government Directory : 1990. Alexandria: Braddock Communications. 1989. OCLC 77624080.
- George, Carol V. R. (2015). One Mississippi, Two Mississippi: Methodists, Murder, and the Struggle for Racial Justice in Neshoba County. Oxford University Press. ISBN 9780190231095.
- Krane, Dale; Shaffer, Stephen D. (1992). Mississippi Government and Politics: Modernizers Versus Traditionalists. University of Nebraska Press. ISBN 9780803277588.
- Lamis, Alexander P., ed. (1999). Southern Politics in the 1990s. Louisiana State University Press. ISBN 9780807166765.
- Moreland, Laurence; Steed, Robert; Baker, Tod, eds. (1991). The 1988 Presidential Election in the South. Greenwood Publishing Group. ISBN 9780275931452.
- Moreland, Laurence; Steed, Robert; Baker, Tod, eds. (1994). The 1992 Presidential Election in the South. Greenwood Publishing Group. ISBN 9780275945343.
- Nash, Jere; Taggart, Andy (2009). Mississippi Politics: The Struggle for Power, 1976-2008 (second ed.). University Press of Mississippi. ISBN 9781604733570.
- Whitlinger, Claire (June 2015). "From Countermemory to Collective Memory: Acknowledging the "Mississippi Burning" Murders". Sociological Forum. 30: 648–670. doi:10.1111/socf.12182. hdl:2027.42/111921.

Party political offices
Preceded by Edwin L. Pittman	Democratic nominee for Secretary of State of Mississippi; 1983, 1987, 1991	Succeeded by Eric Clark
Preceded by Ray Mabus	Democratic nominee for Governor of Mississippi; 1995	Succeeded by Ronnie Musgrove
