= 1995 Mississippi gubernatorial election =

- November 7, 1995
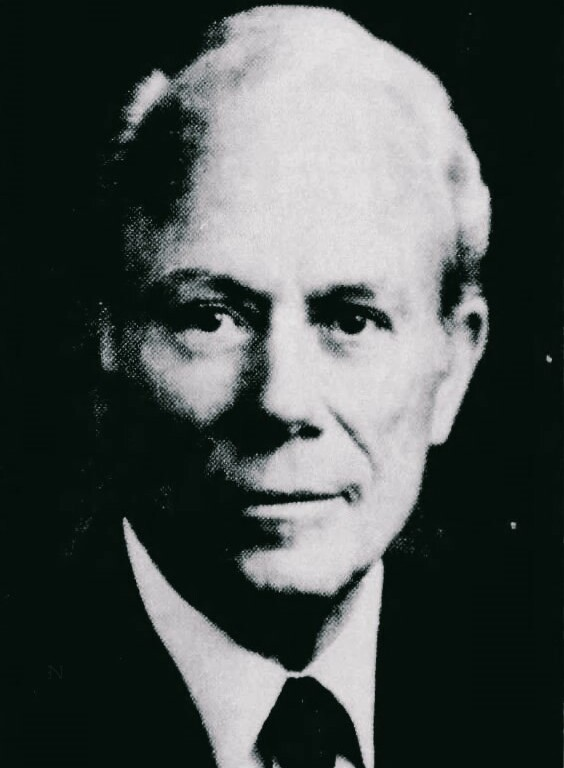

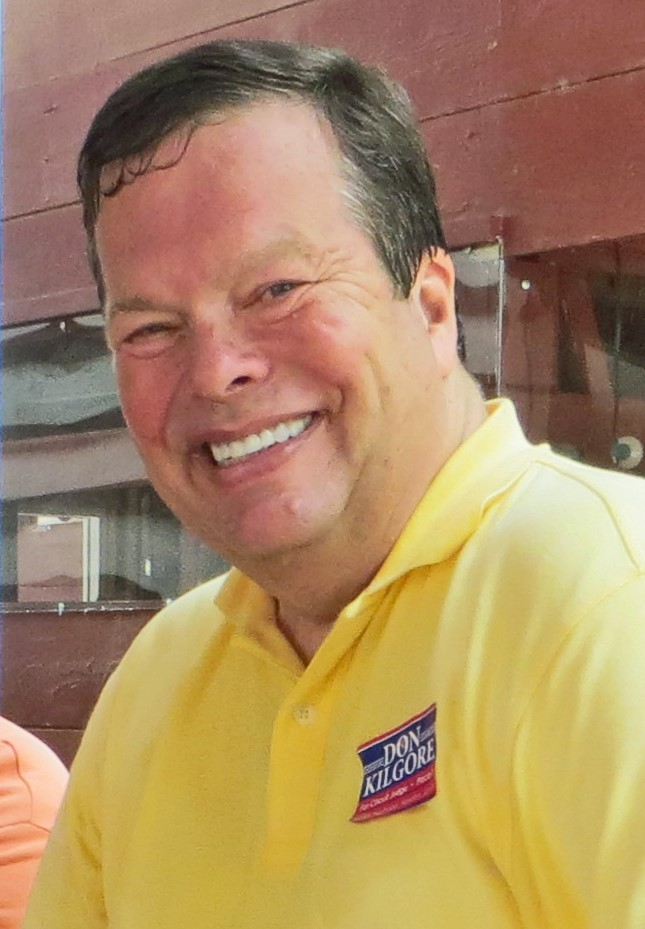
Nominee	Kirk Fordice	Dick Molpus
Party	Republican	Democratic
Popular vote	455,261	364,210
Percentage	55.56%	44.44%
- County results Fordice: 50–60% 60–70% 70–80% Molpus: 50–60% 60–70% 70–80% 80–90% Tie: 50%
Governor before election
Kirk Fordice
Republican
Elected Governor
Kirk Fordice
Republican

The 1995 Mississippi gubernatorial election took place on November 7, 1995 to elect the Governor of Mississippi. Incumbent Republican Kirk Fordice won reelection to a second term. This is the last time that a gubernatorial nominee and a lieutenant gubernatorial nominee of different political parties were elected governor and lieutenant governor in Mississippi.

== Democratic primary ==
In 1993, John Grisham, a novelist and former state legislator, helped Molpus raise over $200,000. Mississippi Secretary of State Dick Molpus won the Democratic primary, defeating business consultant and 1991 independent candidate Shawn O'Hara.

=== Results ===
Mississippi Democratic gubernatorial primary, 1995
Party	Candidate	Votes	%
Democratic	Dick Molpus	396,816	77.10
Democratic	Shawn O'Hara	117,833	22.90
Total votes		514,649	100.00

== Republican primary ==
Incumbent Governor Kirk Fordice won the Republican primary, defeating two minor candidates.

=== Results ===
Mississippi Republican gubernatorial primary, 1995
Party	Candidate	Votes	%
Republican	Kirk Fordice (incumbent)	117,907	93.74
Republican	George "Wagon Wheel" Blair	4,919	3.91
Republican	Richard O'Hara	2,956	2.35
Total votes		125,782	100.00

== General election ==
Molpus sought to prevail with a coalition of blacks, white progressives, and possibly white blue collar workers. By the 1990s, Mississippi's politics were trending in an increasingly conservative direction and the interest in reform initiated by Winter's administration was fading. Fordice's position was bolstered by the improving economic and fiscal situation of the state in the 1990s, and early polls indicated that he had a large lead. Since both men faced minimal opposition for their party's nominations, they were able to concentrate their rhetoric on each other early in their campaigns. Anticipating that Molpus would campaign on education improvements, Fordice proposed a conservative education plan which entailed allowing local school districts to fund private schools with state funds. Molpus argued that such a scheme would undermine public schools.

Both candidates proposed tax cuts, though through different means. Molpus suggested reducing the state sales tax on food from 7 percent to 3.5 percent with a corresponding cut of 1.5 percent in overall government expenditures, saying that such a scale-back would encourage legislators to maximize government efficiency. Fordice, who favored an income tax reduction, accused Molpus of flip-flopping, since Molpus had supported a sales tax increase in 1992. Both men supported bond issues to finance economic development efforts, though Molpus accused Fordice of employing general obligation bonds in a "helter-skelter and out of focus" manner that created too much debt. Molpus stated he would create a new statewide bonding program with "a clearer, long-term vision".

The campaign was marked by personal animosity between Molpus and Fordice. Early in the contest Molpus stated that he had "irreconcilable differences" with Fordice's policy positions. Fordice had used the same phrase to describe marriage troubles with his wife, Pat, in 1993. At a joint appearance before business conference in April, Fordice brought his wife on stage to defend their marriage and accused Molpus of taking "thinly-veiled cheap shot" against their relationship. Molpus maintained that his words had been misunderstood, but the media widely reported the exchange. Fordice also demanded that Molpus resign from his office, since the secretary of state was responsible for overseeing elections and thus had a possible conflict of interest in doing so while running for another state office. Molpus refused, calling the solicitation "ridiculous".

Both men participated in the first-ever political debate held at the Neshoba County Fair in August. A bitter exchange occurred after the moderator questioned Fordice about his troubled marriage, with Fordice answering in defense of himself while pointing his finger at Molpus. Molpus said to the governor, "Your private life doesn't interest me ... Your public life is what appalls me," causing the crowd to go into uproar. In reference to the 1964 Mississippi Burning murders, Fordice said, "I'll tell you this. I don't believe we need to keep running this state by Mississippi Burning and apologizing for what happened 30 years ago. This is the '90s. This is now. We are on a roll. We've got the best race relations in the United States of America." He finished his remarks by saying, "Never apologize! Never look back! Forward together!" Molpus responded by referring to his 1989 speech, "I apologized to the family, the mother and father and sisters of those three young men who lost their life in Mississippi. I make no apologies to you about that... Kirk Fordice leads more by venom than vision." In a subsequent interview, he accused the governor of being "openly antagonistic to blacks."

In October Molpus' campaign ran a television advertisement featuring his wife criticizing Fordice's education policies. Fordice subsequently mocked her voice at a lunch with journalists. Molpus denounced Fordice's mimicry, saying "Frankly, I'd like to take him out behind the woodshed." Several days later, Fordice approached Molpus after a televised appearance and told him, "This 61-year-old man will take you to the woodshed and I'll whip your ass". Molpus hoped to leverage the incident to his advantage by appealing to more women voters, presenting himself as a gentleman acting in defense of his wife's honor. A poll conducted by Mason-Dixon Political/Media Research in late October showed the margins of support between the two candidates narrowing, with Molpus having picked up additional support from women.

Fordice won the November 7, earning 455,261 votes (55.6 percent) to Molpus' 364,210 votes (44.4 percent). Molpus received about 25,000 more votes than Democrat Mabus had in 1991. He garnered less than 20 percent of the white vote while Fordice won fifty-one of the fifty-eight majority white counties, while Molpus won twenty-one of the state's twenty-four majority black counties. His campaign manager suggested that white voters wanted to "punish" him for his 1989 comments on the Mississippi Burning murders. Molpus' supporters accused Fordice of prevailing due to the use of racist dog whistles, a charge which the governor's backers disputed.

Fordice spent $3.16 million during the campaign while Molpus spent $2.38 million.

=== Results ===
Mississippi gubernatorial election, 1995
Party	Candidate	Votes	%
Republican	Kirk Fordice (incumbent)	455,261	55.56%
Democratic	Dick Molpus	364,210	44.44%
Total votes		819,471	100.00
Republican hold			

== Works cited ==
- George, Carol V. R. (2015). One Mississippi, Two Mississippi: Methodists, Murder, and the Struggle for Racial Justice in Neshoba County. Oxford University Press. ISBN 9780190231095.
- Lamis, Alexander P., ed. (1999). Southern Politics in the 1990s. Louisiana State University Press. ISBN 9780807166765.
- Nash, Jere; Taggart, Andy (2009). Mississippi Politics: The Struggle for Power, 1976-2008 (second ed.). University Press of Mississippi. ISBN 9781604733570.
