= 1993 United States elections =

- ← 1991 1992 1993 1994 1995 → Off-year elections
- Election day: November 2

Congressional special elections
- Seats contested: 6
- Net seat change: 0

Gubernatorial elections
- Seats contested: 2
- Net seat change: Republican +2
- 1993 gubernatorial election results map

Legend
- Republican gain Republican hold No election

Elections were held on Tuesday, November 2, 1993, comprising 2 gubernatorial races, 6 congressional special elections, and a plethora of other local elections across the United States. No Senate special elections were held.

The Republican Party dominated the election, notably flipping the governorships in Virginia and New Jersey, only one of them President Bill Clinton had won in the 1992 presidential election over President George H. W. Bush. These Republican victories in Virginia and New Jersey foreshadowed the incoming 1994 midterm elections, dubbed the Republican revolution. These Republican gains were attributed to Clinton's unpopularity, especially over his healthcare proposal in Congress.

== Federal elections ==
=== United States House of Representatives special elections ===
In 1993, six special elections were held to fill vacancies to the United States Congress. They were for California's 17th congressional district, Michigan's 3rd congressional district, Mississippi's 2nd congressional district, Ohio's 2nd congressional district, Wisconsin's 1st congressional district.

District	Incumbent			This race	
District	Member	Party	First elected	Results	Candidates
Wisconsin 1	Les Aspin	Democratic	1970	Incumbent resigned January 20, 1993, to become U.S. Secretary of Defense. New member elected May 4, 1993. Democratic hold.	▌ ✓ Peter W. Barca (Democratic) 49.90%; ▌Mark Neumann (Republican) 49.29%; Others: ▌Edward J. Kozak (Libertarian) 0.34%; ▌Gary W. Thompson (Independent) 0.29%; ▌Karl Huebner (Independent) 0.18%
Mississippi 2	Mike Espy	Democratic	1986	Incumbent resigned January 22, 1993, to become U.S. Secretary of Agriculture. New member elected April 13, 1993. Democratic hold.	▌ ✓ Bennie Thompson (Democratic) 55.16%; ▌Hayes Dent (Republican) 44.84%
California 17	Leon Panetta	Democratic	1976	Incumbent resigned January 23, 1993, to become Director of the Office of Management and Budget. New member elected June 8, 1993. Democratic hold.	▌ ✓ Sam Farr (Democratic) 25.77%; ▌William W. Monning (Democratic) 18.62%; ▌Barbara Shipnuk (Democratic) 14.18%; ▌Bill McCampbell (Republican) 11.92%; ▌Jess Brown (Republican) 10.22%; ▌Bob Ernst (Republican) 5.60%; ▌Martin Vonnegut (Democratic) 3.26%; Others: ▌Barbara Honegger (Republican) 2.03%; ▌Lancelot C. McClair (Democratic) 1.54%}; ▌Richard J. Quigley (Libertarian) 0.45%; ▌Kevin G. Clark (Green) 0.35%; ▌Jerome "Jerry" McCready (American Independent) 0.32%; ▌Peter James (Independent) 0.18%; ▌James "Jimmy" Ogle (Independent) 0.13%
Ohio 2	Bill Gradison	Republican	1974	Incumbent resigned January 31, 1993, to become president of the Health Insurance Association of America. New member elected May 4, 1993. Republican hold.	▌ ✓ Rob Portman (Republican) 70.07%; ▌Lee Hornberger (Democratic) 29.93%
Michigan 3	Paul B. Henry	Republican	1984	Incumbent died July 31, 1993. New member elected December 7, 1993. Republican hold.	▌ ✓ Vern Ehlers (Republican) 66.62%; ▌Dale Robert Sprik (Democratic) 23.17%; ▌Dawn I. Krupp (Independent) 10.15%; ▌Write-ins 0.06%

== State and local elections ==
Several statewide elections were held this year, most notably the gubernatorial elections in two U.S. States and one U.S. territory.

=== Gubernatorial elections ===
Two gubernatorial elections were held in 1993 in New Jersey and the Commonwealth of Virginia in which both seats were held by the Democratic Party. Both seats were flipped to the Republican Party . Another gubernatorial race was held in the Northern Mariana Islands as well.

State	Incumbent	Party	First elected	Result	Candidates
New Jersey	James Florio	Democratic	1989	Incumbent lost re-election. New governor elected. Republican gain.	✓ Christine Todd Whitman (Republican) 49.3%; James Florio (Democratic) 48.3%
Virginia	Douglas Wilder	Democratic	1989	Incumbent term-limited. New governor elected. Republican gain.	✓ George Allen (Republican) 58.3%; Mary Sue Terry (Democratic) 40.9%
