= 1994 United States elections =

- ← 1992 1993 1994 1995 1996 → Midterm elections
- Election day: November 8
- Incumbent president: ▌Bill Clinton (D)
- Next Congress: 104th

Senate elections
- Overall control: Republican gain
- Seats contested: 35 of 100 seats (33 Class 1 seats + 2 special elections)
- Net seat change: Republican +8
- 1994 Senate election results Democratic hold Republican gain Republican hold

House elections
- Overall control: Republican gain
- Seats contested: All 435 voting seats
- Popular vote margin: Republican +6.8%
- Net seat change: Republican +54
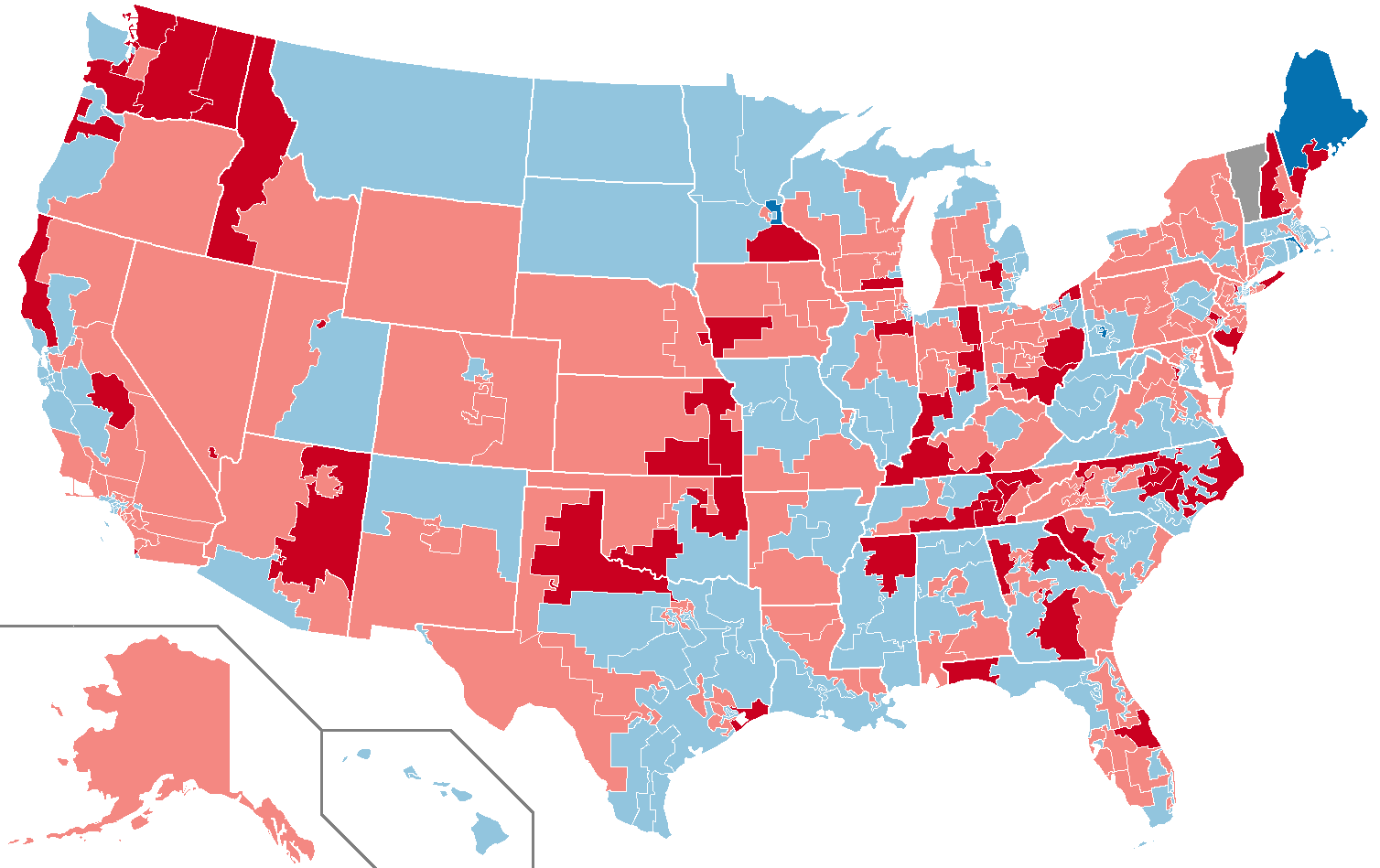
- 1994 House of Representatives results (territorial delegate races not shown) Democratic gain Democratic hold Republican gain Republican hold Independent hold

Gubernatorial elections
- Seats contested: 38 (36 states, 2 territories)
- Net seat change: Republican +10
- 1994 gubernatorial election results Democratic gain Democratic hold Republican gain Republican hold Independent gain

Elections were held on November 8, 1994, in the middle of Democratic President Bill Clinton's first term. The elections have been described as the "Republican Revolution" because the Republican Party captured unified control of Congress for the first time since 1952. Republicans picked up eight seats in the Senate and won a net of 54 seats in the House of Representatives. Republicans also picked up a net of ten governorships and took control of many state legislative chambers. This is the first midterm election since 1946 in which the Republicans flipped both houses of Congress and ended unified Democratic control under a Democratic president. It was also the first midterm election since 1954 in which any major party simultaneously flipped both houses and ended a government trifecta.

Republicans were able to nationalize the election by campaigning on a "Contract with America", and the new Republican majorities passed conservative legislation such as the Telecommunications Act of 1996, the Personal Responsibility and Work Opportunity Act, and the Defense of Marriage Act. The election was a major defeat for Clinton's health care plan. George W. Bush's election as Governor of Texas laid the groundwork for his successful campaign for president in 2000.

== Federal elections ==
=== Senate elections ===
In the Senate elections, Republicans successfully defended all of their seats and won eight from the Democrats, defeating incumbent Senators Harris Wofford (Pennsylvania) and Jim Sasser (Tennessee), in addition to picking up six open seats in Arizona, Maine, Michigan, Ohio, Oklahoma, and Tennessee. Notably, since Sasser's defeat coincided with a Republican victory in the special election to replace Al Gore, Tennessee's Senate delegation switched from entirely Democratic to entirely Republican in a single election. Minority leader Robert J. Dole became Majority Leader, while on the Democratic side, Tom Daschle became Minority Leader after the retirement of the previous Democratic leader, George J. Mitchell.

Initially, the balance was 52–48 in favor of the Republicans, but after the power change, Democrats Richard Shelby and Ben Nighthorse Campbell switched parties, bringing the balance to 54–46. The Democrats took back a seat in January 1996 in a special election in Oregon when Ron Wyden won an open seat left vacated by Republican Bob Packwood.

=== House of Representatives elections ===
Republicans won the national popular vote for the House of Representatives by a margin of 6.8 percentage points and picked up 54 seats. The South underwent a drastic transformation, as Republicans picked up 19 Southern seats, leaving them with more seats than Democrats in the South, last achieved during Reconstruction. Thirty four incumbents, all Democrats, were defeated. The incumbent Speaker, Democrat Tom Foley, lost re-election in his district, becoming the first Speaker of the House to lose re-election since Galusha Grow in 1863. Other major upsets included the defeat of House Ways and Means Chairman Dan Rostenkowski and House Judiciary Chairman Jack Brooks. The incumbent Republican Minority whip, Newt Gingrich, was re-elected in the Republican landslide and became Speaker as the incumbent Republican Minority Leader, Robert H. Michel, retired. The incumbent Democratic Majority Leader, Dick Gephardt, became Minority Leader.

== State elections ==
Heading into the election, there were 21 seats held by Democrats, 14 held by Republicans, and one by an independent. By the end of the elections, 11 seats would be held by Democrats, 24 by Republicans, and one by an independent.

In addition, Republicans gained the majority of state legislative seats for the first time in decades.

== Contract with America ==
During the campaign, the United States Republican Party released a document that it called the Contract with America. Written by Larry Hunter, who was aided by Newt Gingrich, Robert Walker, Richard Armey, Bill Paxon, Tom DeLay, John Boehner and Jim Nussle, and in part using text from former President Ronald Reagan's 1985 State of the Union Address, the Contract detailed the actions the Republicans promised to take if they became the majority party in the United States House of Representatives, last achieved in 1952.

Many of the Contract's policy ideas originated at The Heritage Foundation, a conservative think tank. The Contract with America was signed by all but two of the Republican members of the House and all of the Party's non-incumbent Republican Congressional candidates.

Proponents say the Contract was revolutionary in its commitment to offering specific legislation for a vote, describing in detail the precise plan of the Congressional Representatives, last achieved during the 1918 Congressional election had been run broadly on a national level. Furthermore, its provisions represented the view of many conservative Republicans on the issues of shrinking the size of government, promoting lower taxes and greater entrepreneurial activity, and both tort reform and welfare reform.

In 2014, historian John Steele Gordon, writing in The American, an online magazine published by the American Enterprise Institute, said that "the main reason (for the Republican victory in 1994) was surely the Contract with America" in part because it "nationalized the election, making it one of reform versus business as usual. The people voted for reform." He said that the Contract "turned out to be a brilliant political ploy. The contract tuned in to the American electorate’s deep yearning for reform in Washington, a yearning that had expressed itself in the elections of both [U.S. Presidents] Jimmy Carter and Ronald Reagan."
