= 1997 United States elections =

- ← 1995 1996 1997 1998 1999 → Off-year elections
- Election day: November 4

Congressional special elections
- Seats contested: 3
- Net seat change: Republican +1

Gubernatorial elections
- Seats contested: 2
- Net seat change: 0
- 1997 gubernatorial election results map

Legend
- Republican gain Republican hold No election

Elections were held on Tuesday, November 4, 1997, comprising 2 gubernatorial races, 3 congressional special elections, and a plethora of other local elections across the United States. No Senate special elections were held.

== Federal elections ==
=== United States House of Representatives special elections ===
In 1997, three special elections were held to fill vacancies to the 105th United States Congress. They were for Texas's 28th congressional district, New Mexico's 3rd congressional district, and New York's 13th congressional district.

District	Date	Predecessor	Winner	Cause of vacancy
Texas 28	April 12, 1997	Frank Tejeda (D)	Ciro Rodriguez (D)	Died.
New Mexico 3	May 13, 1997	Bill Richardson (D)	Bill Redmond (R)	Resigned upon appointment as United States Ambassador to the United Nations.
New York 13	November 4, 1997	Susan Molinari (R)	Vito Fossella (R)	Resigned to become anchor of CBS This Morning.

== State and local elections ==
Several statewide elections were held this year, most notably the gubernatorial elections in two U.S. States and one U.S. territory.

=== Gubernatorial elections ===
Two gubernatorial elections were held in 1997 in New Jersey and the Commonwealth of Virginia in which both seats were held by the Republican Party. Another gubernatorial race was held in the Northern Mariana Islands as well which resulted as a Republican gain.

State	Incumbent	Party	Status	Opposing candidates
New Jersey	Christine Todd Whitman	Republican	Re-elected, 47.1%	Jim McGreevey (Democratic) 46.0% Murray Sabrin (Libertarian) 4.7% Richard Pezzullo (Conservative) 1.5% Madelyn Hoffman (Green) 0.4% Michael Perrone (Independent) 0.3% Robert Miller (Socialist Workers) 0.1%
Northern Mariana Islands	Froilan Tenorio	Democratic	Defeated, 27.27%	Pedro Tenorio (Republican) 46.47% Jesse Borja (Independent) 26.26%
Virginia	George Allen	Republican	Term-limited, Republican victory	Jim Gilmore (Republican) 55.8% Don Beyer (Democratic) 42.6% Sue DeBauche (Reform) 1.5%

Note: Candidates' vote percentages are rounded to the nearest tenth of one percent. Candidates earning 0.05% or more of the vote are included.

=== Mayoral elections ===
- The Allentown mayoral election saw the re-election of Republican William L. Heydt against Democratic Party nominee Martin Velazquez III, a city councilman.
- In Boston, Democrat Thomas Menino ran unopposed in the election and therefore served his second term as Mayor.
- Houston's officially nonpartisan election resulted in Lee P. Brown, a Democrat, ascend to the Mayor's office two years after leaving U.S. President Bill Clinton's cabinet as Director of National Drug Control Policy.
- The mayoral election in Los Angeles was the most recent election to date in which a Republican, incumbent Richard Riordan, was elected mayoral of the city. He defeated Democratic challenger Tom Hayden on election day.
- The New York City mayoral election saw the re-election of Republican Rudy Giuliani against Democratic Party nominee Ruth Messinger, the Manhattan Borough President.

Elections were also held in Pittsburgh, Buffalo and Peoria, among several other cities in the country.
