= Andy P. Mullins =

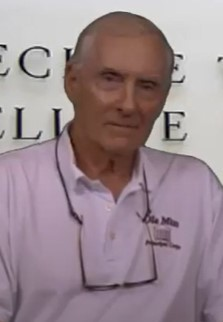
Mullins in 2016

Andrew P. Mullins Jr. is an American retired educator.

== Early life ==
Mullins grew up in Macon, Mississippi. He graduated from Noxubee County High School and then earned a bachelor's degree in history from Millsaps College. He later earned a master's degree and doctorate in history at the University of Mississippi.

== Career ==
In November 1980, Governor William F. Winter hired Mullins as an education policy advisor. He frequently accompanied Winter to appearances with intergovernmental organizations. He also served as aide to the governor's Blue Ribbon Committee on Education, which was tasked with studying public education in Mississippi and suggesting reforms. He also helped Winter lobby the Mississippi State Legislature to pass the 1982 Education Reform Act, joining the governor's staff for strategy sessions to build public support for the bill. State Senator Ellis B. Bodron, who was broadly opposed to the legislation, denounced Mullins and other young Winter aides—including Ray Mabus, David Crews, Bill Gartin, Dick Molpus, and John Henegan—as the "Boys of Spring", a moniker in which they thereafter took pride.

After Winter left office in 1984, Mullins became a special assistant for Governor Bill Allain. Allain assigned him as a staff support member to the newly-reformed Mississippi Board of Education. After six months, Mullins became an assistant to the Mississippi Superintendent of Education.

Upon leaving politics, Mullins returned to work in education. He cofounded the Mississippi Teachers Corps in 1990. In 1994 he became an administrator at the University of Mississippi. In 2008, Mullins helped organize the debate between candidates Barack Obama and John McCain hosted by the university during the 2008 United States presidential election.

== Works cited ==
- Bolton, Charles C. (2013). William F. Winter and the New Mississippi: A Biography. Jackson: University Press of Mississippi. ISBN 978-1-61703-787-0.
- McKenzie, Danny; Reed, Jack Raymond (2009). A Time to Speak : Speeches by Jack Reed. University Press of Mississippi. ISBN 9781604731309.
- Nash, Jere; Taggart, Andy (2009). Mississippi Politics: The Struggle for Power, 1976-2008 (second ed.). University Press of Mississippi. ISBN 9781604733570.
