= Pat Fordice =

American politician (1934–2007)

First Lady of Mississippi
- In role January 14, 1992 – December 9, 1999 (with divorce)
- Governor: Kirk Fordice

Personal details
- Born: Patricia Owens; November 27, 1934 Jackson, Mississippi, U.S.
- Died: July 12, 2007 (aged 72) Madison, Mississippi, U.S.
- Resting place: Parkway Memorial Cemetery, Ridgeland, Mississippi
- Party: Republican
- Spouse: Kirk Fordice (1955-1999; divorced)

Patricia Owens Fordice (born Patricia Owens; November 27, 1934 – July 12, 2007) was the First Lady of Mississippi from 1992 until 1999, the wife of Republican Governor Kirk Fordice.

== First Lady of Mississippi ==
Pat Fordice, served as the First Lady of Mississippi during Governor Kirk Fordice's tenure from 1992 to 2000. After their divorce in 1999, she remained active in public life. She continued to be recognized for her contributions to the state and was often referred as Mississippi's “eternal first lady.” The Mississippi State Legislature awarded her a formal recognition during the 1999 regular session. In Washington, D.C., she received the Mrs. Lyndon B. Johnson National Award, and U.S. President George W. Bush presented her with the Presidential Service Award.

She was listed in 2000 in Marquis Who's Who in the World and the following year in the Cambridge Press's 1000 Great Americans. In 2002, she was included in Marquis Who's Who of American Women. She also received the Medal of Honor from the Daughters of the American Revolution. She was knighted as “Dame of Grace” by the Russian Orthodox Order in recognition of humanitarian efforts on behalf of the city of St. Petersburg, Russia.

=== Divorce ===
During the 1990s, widespread media reports covered the governor’s extramarital affair with a recently widowed woman. The Fordices divorced on December 9, 1999, after forty-four years of marriage.

=== Later career ===
In November 2005, Pat Fordice resigned as Jackson’s interim head of Human and Cultural Services, citing the demands of the full-time role. She co-hosted Woman to Woman on Mississippi Public Broadcasting and participated in public service campaigns, including commercials for Keep Mississippi Beautiful and the Mississippi Department of Transportation’s anti-littering initiative.

== Death ==
Pat Fordice died in 2007, aged 72, of cancer at her home in Madison, Mississippi.
