= 1991 Mississippi gubernatorial election =

- November 5, 1991
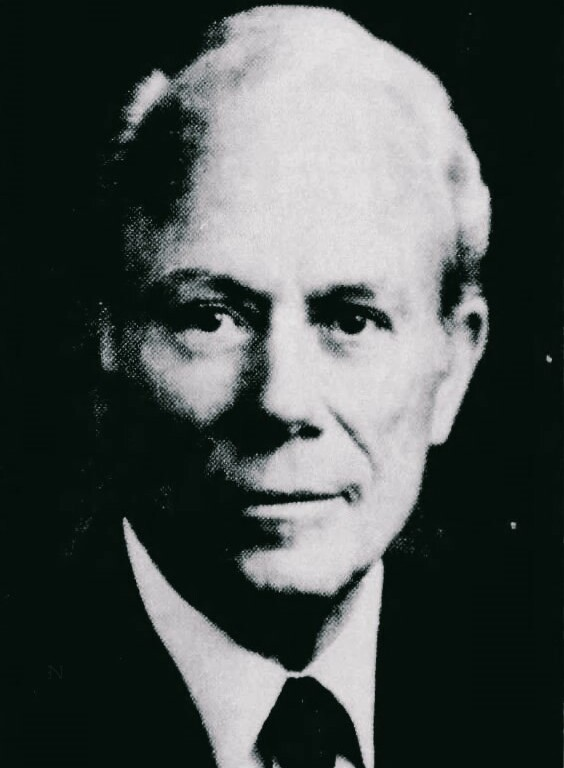

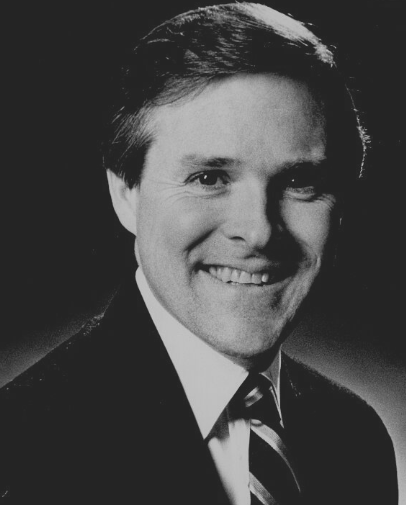
Nominee	Kirk Fordice	Ray Mabus
Party	Republican	Democratic
Popular vote	361,500	338,459
Percentage	50.83%	47.59%
- County results Fordice: 40–50% 50–60% 60–70% 70–80% Mabus: 50–60% 60–70% 70–80%
Governor before election
Ray Mabus
Democratic
Elected Governor
Kirk Fordice
Republican

The 1991 Mississippi gubernatorial election took place on November 5, 1991 to elect the Governor of Mississippi. Incumbent Democrat Ray Mabus unsuccessfully ran for reelection to a second term. This election marked the first time a Republican was elected Governor of Mississippi since Reconstruction, when Adelbert Ames won the office in 1873.

This is the last gubernatorial election where the Democratic candidate carried any of three counties (Hancock, Harrison and Jackson) along the Mississippi Gulf Coast.

== Democratic primary ==
Incumbent Democrat Ray Mabus won the Democratic primary, defeating former U.S. Representative Wayne Dowdy and George "Wagon Wheel" Blair. According to The New York Times, Mabus had to fend off charges that he was "arrogant and out of touch with Mississippi politically", and was perceived as a "Porsche politician in a Chevy pickup state".

=== Results ===
Mississippi Democratic gubernatorial primary, 1991
Party	Candidate	Votes	%
Democratic	Ray Mabus (incumbent)	368,679	50.75
Democratic	Wayne Dowdy	299,172	41.18
Democratic	George "Wagon Wheel" Blair	58,614	8.07
Total votes		726,465	100.00

== Republican primary ==
No candidate received a majority in the Republican primary, so a runoff was held between the top two candidates. The runoff election was won by businessman Kirk Fordice, who defeated State Auditor Pete Johnson.

=== Results ===
Mississippi Republican gubernatorial primary, 1991
Party	Candidate	Votes	%
Republican	Kirk Fordice	28,411	44.64
Republican	Pete Johnson	27,651	43.44
Republican	Bobby Clanton	7,589	11.92
Total votes		63,651	100.00

=== Runoff ===
Mississippi Republican gubernatorial primary runoff, 1991
Party	Candidate	Votes	%
Republican	Kirk Fordice	31,753	60.63
Republican	Pete Johnson	20,622	39.37
Total votes		52,375	100.00

== General election ==
Fordice won 65 legislative districts against the 54 won by Mabus. This was above the 62 districts required to win. Fordice spent $901,823 during the campaign while Mabus spent $3.59 million. Fordice was the first successful gubernatorial candidate since 1975 to spend less than $1 million during their campaign.

=== Results ===
Mississippi gubernatorial election, 1991
Party	Candidate	Votes	%
Republican	Kirk Fordice	361,500	50.83%
Democratic	Ray Mabus (incumbent)	338,459	47.59%
Independent	Shawn O'Hara	11,253	1.58%
Total votes		711,212	100.00
Republican gain from Democratic			
