= Kirk Fordice =

American politician and businessman (1934–2004)

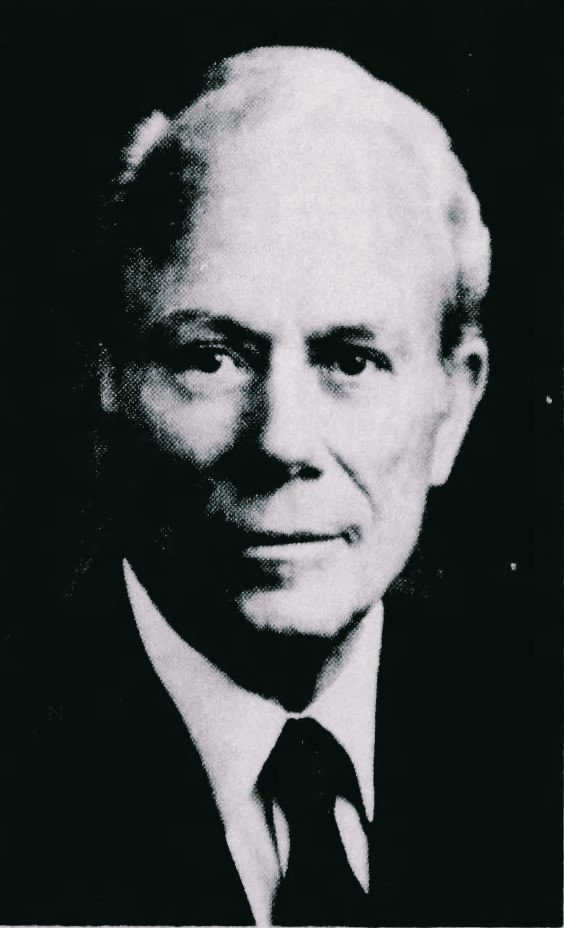

61st Governor of Mississippi
- In office January 14, 1992 – January 11, 2000
- Lieutenant: Eddie Briggs; Ronnie Musgrove
- Preceded by: Ray Mabus
- Succeeded by: Ronnie Musgrove

Personal details
- Born: Daniel Kirkwood Fordice Jr. February 10, 1934 Memphis, Tennessee, U.S.
- Died: September 7, 2004 (aged 70) Jackson, Mississippi, U.S.
- Resting place: Parkway Memorial Cemetery, Ridgeland, Mississippi
- Party: Republican
- Spouses: Patricia Owens (m. 1955; div. 1999) Ann G. Creson (m. 2000; div. 2003)
- Children: 4
- Education: Purdue University (BS, MS)
- Profession: Businessman

Military service
- Allegiance: United States
- Branch/service: United States Army; Army Reserve
- Years of service: 1957–1959; 1959–1977
- Rank: Colonel
- Battles/wars: Vietnam War: 1st Infantry Division

Daniel Kirkwood "Kirk" Fordice Jr. (/fɔːrdaɪs/; February 10, 1934 – September 7, 2004) was an American politician and businessman who served as the 61st governor of Mississippi from 1992 to 2000. A member of the Republican Party, he was the state's first governor elected to two consecutive four-year terms (following a 1987 amendment to the state constitution). He was the first Republican governor to serve in Mississippi since Adelbert Ames, who resigned in 1876.

A staunch conservative, Fordice ran on a pro-business, anti-crime, low-tax, "family values" platform. Fordice's tenure was marked by an extramarital affair, which led to his divorce from his wife of forty-four years, Pat Fordice.

Fordice first ran for governor in 1991, defeating Democratic incumbent Ray Mabus with nearly 51% of the vote, and was decisively reelected in 1995. He was term limited in 1999, and was succeeded by Ronnie Musgrove.

== Early life ==
Daniel Kirkwood Fordice Jr. was born in Memphis, Tennessee, on February 10, 1934. He studied civil engineering at Purdue University, earning a bachelor's degree and a master's in 1956 and 1957, respectively. After graduation he served with the United States Army for two years. He remained in the Army Reserve until 1977, retiring with the rank of colonel.

Fordice eventually took control of his father's firm, Fordice Construction Company. In the 1960s he created a building division for the company, focusing on industrial structures, and in the 1980 he created a bridge division. Fordice's reliance on federal government contracts led him to involve himself in several construction trade groups. In 1974 he joined the executive committee of the Associated General Contractors of America. Holding various leadership positions in the group from 1988 to 1991 (serving the last two years as its president), he acted as a strong proponent of the construction industry and testified several times before U.S. congressional committees. He led the organization through several involved lawsuits aimed at ending minority and small business set-aside requirements for contracting, including City of Richmond v. J.A. Croson Co.. His activity in the trade groups increased his interest in politics.

== Political career ==
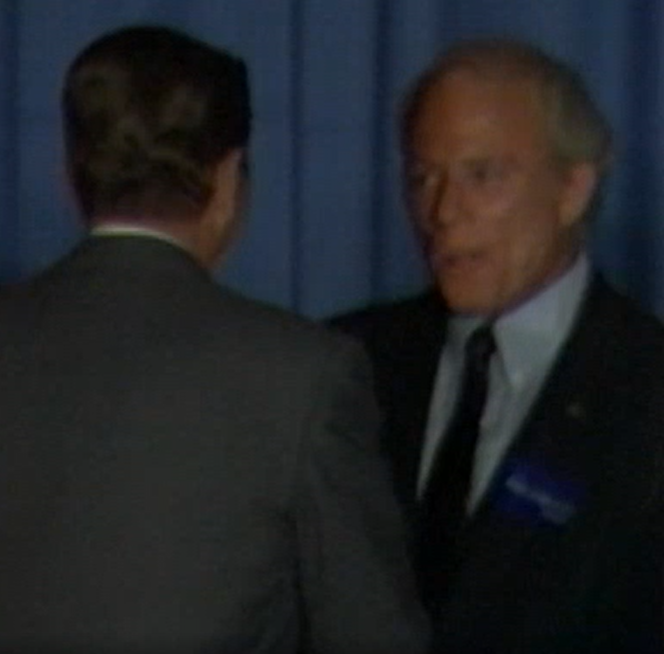
Fordice greeting President Ronald Reagan at a Republican fundraising dinner in 1983

Fordice joined the Republican Party during Barry Goldwater's 1964 presidential campaign. He chaired the Warren County organizations for Gil Carmichael's gubernatorial campaigns in the 1970s. In 1982 he was elected secretary of the Mississippi Republican Party and convinced the Associated General Contractors to publicly support Republican Haley Barbour in that year's United States Senate election in Mississippi.

In 1991 State Auditor Pete Johnson, a former Democrat, entered the 1991 Republican gubernatorial primary. He was challenged by Fordice and another candidate. While Johnson was treated as the frontrunner for much of the campaign, Fordice gradually built a skilled political organization. He characterized Johnson as a "professional politician". Fordice led in the first primary and defeated Johnson in an October runoff, taking 31,753 votes to Johnson's 20,622 votes. While he approached Republican leaders who had embraced Johnson early on with some suspicion, the party rallied around him for the general election.

In the general election Fordice faced Democratic incumbent Ray Mabus. Fordice declared his support for legislative term limits and welfare reform. He labeled Mabus a "Kennedyesque liberal" who focused too much on education and criticized his deficit spending. Republican-hosted focus groups found the governor to be "aloof" and unconcerned with the necessities of "average" Mississippians. Mabus continued to advocate support for public education and attack Fordice as a lobbyist and outside who did not appreciate the needs of the state. Later in the campaign, race became an issue, as Fordice declared his support for workfare and ending racial quotas. Mabus aired a series of television ads which accused Fordice of planning to shut down the state's historically black schools.

The governor spent twice as much as his opponent and held an edge in polls up to the election, but many potential voters identified themselves as undecided. On November 5, Fordice won with 50.8 percent to Mabus' 47.6 percent, the first Republican victory in a Mississippi gubernatorial race since 1874. Having received six percent less of the total vote share than in 1987, several observers blamed Mabus' loss on perception that he was an arrogant leader. Turnout among black voters was also lower in 1991, and some national Democrats accused Fordice of using race-baiting tactics. He was inaugurated as governor on January 14, 1992.

He vetoed the Education Enhancement Act of 1992, arguing that it was tantamount to a tax increase, but the legislature overrode his veto.

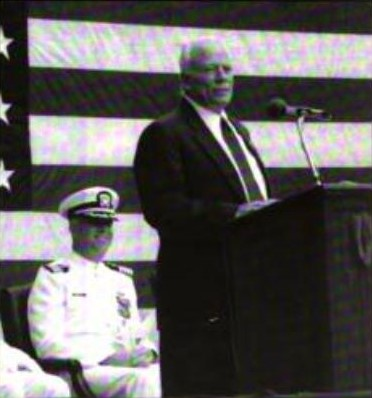
Fordice giving a speech in 1997

Fordice was re-elected in 1995 against Democratic Mississippi Secretary of State Dick Molpus. His second inauguration was on January 16, 1996. An outspoken conservative, Fordice advocated tax cuts, the abolishment of affirmative action, reductions in the welfare system, expanded capital punishment, tougher prison conditions and the building of more prisons. He was injured in a car wreck on November 5, and Lieutenant Governor Ronnie Musgrove served as acting governor from November 7 to December 17 while Fordice recovered in a hospital.

Fordice offended Jewish groups such as B'nai B'rith by referring to America as "a Christian Nation" during a Republican governors conference. South Carolina governor Carroll Campbell quickly offered a correction, adding "Judeo-" as a prefix to Christian, but Fordice snapped back that he meant what he said. He later apologized for any offense. Fordice refused to discuss any increase in public school pay rates across the state, even though Mississippi ranked 49th in the nation. When teachers discussed striking he ordered that any teacher who went on strike be immediately fired.

In August 1996, Fordice signed an executive order banning recognition of same-sex marriages in Mississippi. Lawmakers said then that they would back up the executive order with a law. In 2004, Mississippi voters passed a constitutional amendment defining marriage as only between a man and a woman and further banning recognition of same-sex marriages from other states and countries. Both acts were declared unconstitutional by the 2015 Obergefell v. Hodges decision from the Supreme Court of the United States.

Fordice said he would have quit his position of Governor while still in office, except that he did not want to give the Democratic candidate, Musgrove, any spot-light time of running the state before the actual election. He left office on January 11, 2000.

== Personal life ==
=== Extramarital affair ===
Fordice's tenure was roiled by an extramarital affair with his high school sweetheart Ann G. Creson, which led to his divorce from his wife of forty-four years, Pat Fordice. After leaving office, Fordice married Ann, but they later divorced.

Fordice received much scorn when he suddenly announced that he had "irreconcilable differences" with his wife in 1993; she claimed that she had no intention of getting a divorce, and they remained together. Additionally, in 1996, he was photographed eating lunch with a middle-aged woman. These two scandals were soon overshadowed by Fordice's other actions, and he came to national attention for supporting the impeachment of then-president Bill Clinton on moral grounds. In June 1999, the media reported Fordice's long-running extramarital affair with his high school sweetheart, Ann Creson, who had recently been widowed; they were photographed returning from a vacation together, and journalists reported that Fordice and Creson kissed and massaged each other's shoulders. Outside the governor's private home in Madison, Fordice responded to WLBT reporter Bert Case asking questions in his news car by threatening to "whip [his] ass".

Later that year, he announced that he was divorcing his wife of 44 years and the mother of his four children. In the divorce petition, Fordice claimed that he and his wife had been estranged for three years, even though they both lived in the Governor's mansion, and that he planned to marry Creson as soon as the divorce was finalized. Pat Fordice condemned her husband's actions, issuing a formal statement reading "it is not fair for Governor Fordice to call upon her to calm the storms by making or adopting public announcements which run contrary to her true feelings ... [Pat Fordice] apologizes to the people of this state for being a partner in a marriage that has become a source of embarrassment for Mississippi."

Just days after the divorce was finalized in early 2000, Fordice married Creson; they divorced in 2003. Fordice died in 2004, surrounded by his children and former wife; the two are interred beside each other with their own individual grave markers.

=== Affiliations ===
Fordice was a member of the White supremacist group Council of Conservative Citizens.

=== Retirement years and death ===
After retiring, Fordice settled in Madison, Mississippi. He died from leukemia in Jackson on September 7, 2004, at age 70. Kirk and Pat Fordice, who reconciled shortly before his death, are interred with a double marker at Parkway Memorial Cemetery in Ridgeland.

== Sources ==
- Danielson, Chris (2011). After Freedom Summer : How Race Realigned Mississippi Politics, 1965–1986. University of Florida Press. ISBN 9780813037387.
- Dement, Polly (2014). Mississippi Entrepreneurs. University Press of Mississippi. ISBN 9781626741232.
- Edsall, Thomas B. "Miss. Governor Ending Historic Tenure", The Washington Post, February 27, 1999; pg. L1
- Lamis, Alexander P., ed. (1999). Southern Politics in the 1990s. Louisiana State University Press. ISBN 9780807166765.
- Mullaney, Marie Marmo (1994). Biographical Directory of the Governors of the United States, 1988-1994. Greenwood Publishing Group. ISBN 9780313283123.
- Nash, Jere; Taggart, Andy (2009). Mississippi Politics: The Struggle for Power, 1976-2008 (second ed.). University Press of Mississippi. ISBN 9781604733570.
- Sansing, David G. (2016). Mississippi Governors: Soldiers, Statesmen, Scholars, Scoundrels (first ed.). Oxford: Nautilus Publishing Company. ISBN 978-1-936946-81-5.

Party political offices
Preceded by Jack Reed	Republican nominee for Governor of Mississippi; 1991, 1995	Succeeded by Michael Parker
Political offices
Preceded by Ray Mabus	Governor of Mississippi; January 14, 1992 – January 11, 2000	Succeeded by Ronnie Musgrove
