= National Register of Historic Places listings in Allen County, Kentucky =

Location of Allen County in Kentucky

This is a list of the National Register of Historic Places listings in Allen County, Kentucky.

This is intended to be a complete list of the properties and districts on the National Register of Historic Places in Allen County, Kentucky, United States. The locations of National Register properties and districts for which the latitude and longitude coordinates are included below, may be seen in a map.

There are 13 properties and districts listed on the National Register in the county.

This National Park Service list is complete through NPS recent listings posted August 28, 2026.

== Current listings ==
	Name on the Register	Image	Date listed	Location	City or town	Description
1	Allen County Poor Farm		November 7, 1991 (#91001662)	3540 Holland Rd. 36°43′37″N 86°08′31″W	Scottsville	
2	Big Spring School-Oliver Farmstead		July 12, 2004 (#03000712)	3293 and 3109 Big Springs Rd. 36°52′58″N 86°14′13″W	Settle	
3	Caney Fork School and Church		August 31, 2026 (#100013341)	6111 Brownsford Road; 36°46′07″N 86°04′31″W	Scottsville vicinity	
4	Dumont Hill	Dumont Hill	December 4, 2003 (#03001227)	0.25 miles (0.40 km) north of Kentucky Route 1386; 36°45′32″N 86°11′55″W	Scottsville	
5	Dr. Pellie G. Graves House	Dr. Pellie G. Graves House	August 2, 2001 (#01000798)	301 N. 4th St. 36°45′17″N 86°11′10″W	Scottsville	
6	Dr. Francis Joseph (F.J.) Halcomb Jr. House		August 8, 2018 (#100002152)	253 Franklin Rd. 36°44′20″N 86°13′00″W	Scottsville	
7	Edward and Julia Satterfield House		November 25, 2005 (#05001304)	10085 Bowling Green Rd. 36°49′59″N 86°19′11″W	Scottsville	
8	Scottsville Downtown Commercial Historic District	Scottsville Downtown Commercial Historic District	August 2, 2001 (#01000797)	Public Square and extending roughly one block north and south on Court St., and one block east and west on Main; 36°45′13″N 86°11′27″W	Scottsville	
9	Scottsville Freight Depot	Scottsville Freight Depot	August 2, 2001 (#01000799)	E. Main St. at 8th St. 36°45′10″N 86°10′54″W	Scottsville	
10	Scottsville Public Spring	Scottsville Public Spring	August 2, 2001 (#01000801)	Junction of 1st and Locust Sts. 36°45′05″N 86°11′23″W	Scottsville	
11	The Tabernacle	The Tabernacle	August 2, 2001 (#01000800)	829 Holland Rd. 36°44′44″N 86°10′58″W	Scottsville	
12	J.L. Turner and Son Building	J.L. Turner and Son Building	November 21, 2001 (#01001253)	Old East Main St. at 7th St. 36°45′08″N 86°11′00″W	Scottsville	
13	Andrew M. Whitney House and Barn		March 17, 1994 (#94000250)	Kentucky Route 1855 northeast of Scottsville; 36°47′37″N 86°04′01″W	Scottsville	

== See also ==
- List of National Historic Landmarks in Kentucky
