= James Luther Turner =

American businessman (1891–1964)

James Turner
- Born: James Luther Turner; February 28, 1891; Macon County, Tennessee, U.S.
- Died: April 19, 1964 (aged 73); Scottsville, Kentucky, U.S.
- Occupation: Businessman
- Spouse: Josephine Marcum Turner
- Children: Dollie Turner; Harley Turner; Cal Turner
- Parent(s): Johnnie Turner; Nancy Meador

James Luther Turner (February 28, 1891 – April 19, 1964) was an American businessperson. He was the founder of J.L. Turner and Son, the predecessor of Dollar General.

== Early life ==
James Turner was born on February 28, 1891, to Johnnie and Nancy Turner. His father died in an accident in 1902, resulting in Turner leaving school and finding a job. Turner never returned to school, and did not learn how to read.

== Career ==
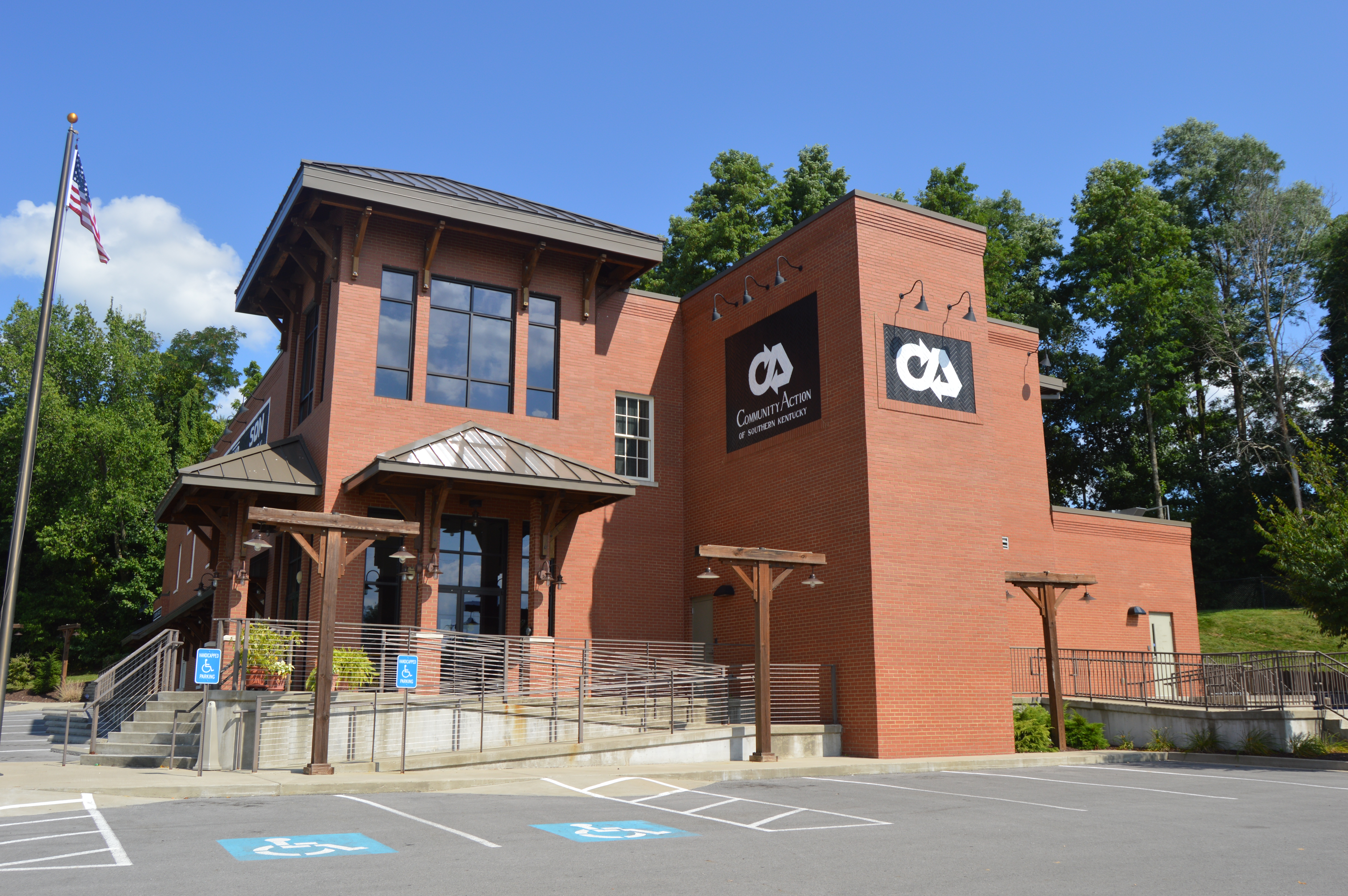
J.L. Turner and Son Building

Turner married in 1908 to Josephine Marcum. He decided to get into retail by opening a bridle shop with Josephine. After a year, the pair sold the bridle shop and moved to Kentucky where he opened a country store. After four years the country store closed. After his country store closed down, Turner worked as a salesman for a wholesale grocery company and then a dry goods retailer in Nashville.

During the Great Depression, Turner was a traveling salesman and liquidated merchandise of bankrupt general stores. The liquidated merchandise from these stores became part of Turners' own general store J.L. Turner and Son established in 1939 with his son, Cal Turner. After World War II, dry goods wholesaling declined leading James to shift his business to retail. The shift to retail led to J.L. Turner and Son reaching annual sales of over $2 million by the 1950s. J.L. Turner and Son grew to 35 department stores in Kentucky and Tennessee. On June 1, 1955, James and Cal opened the first Dollar General store in Scottsville, Kentucky.

== Death ==
In 1964 James died at the age of 73. J.L. Turner and Son turned into Dollar General Corporation in 1968 under his son Cal Turner. His grandson, Cal Turner Jr., established the Dollar General Literacy Foundation in his honor.
