= J.L. Turner and Son Building =

- J. L. Turner and Son Building
- U.S. National Register of Historic Places
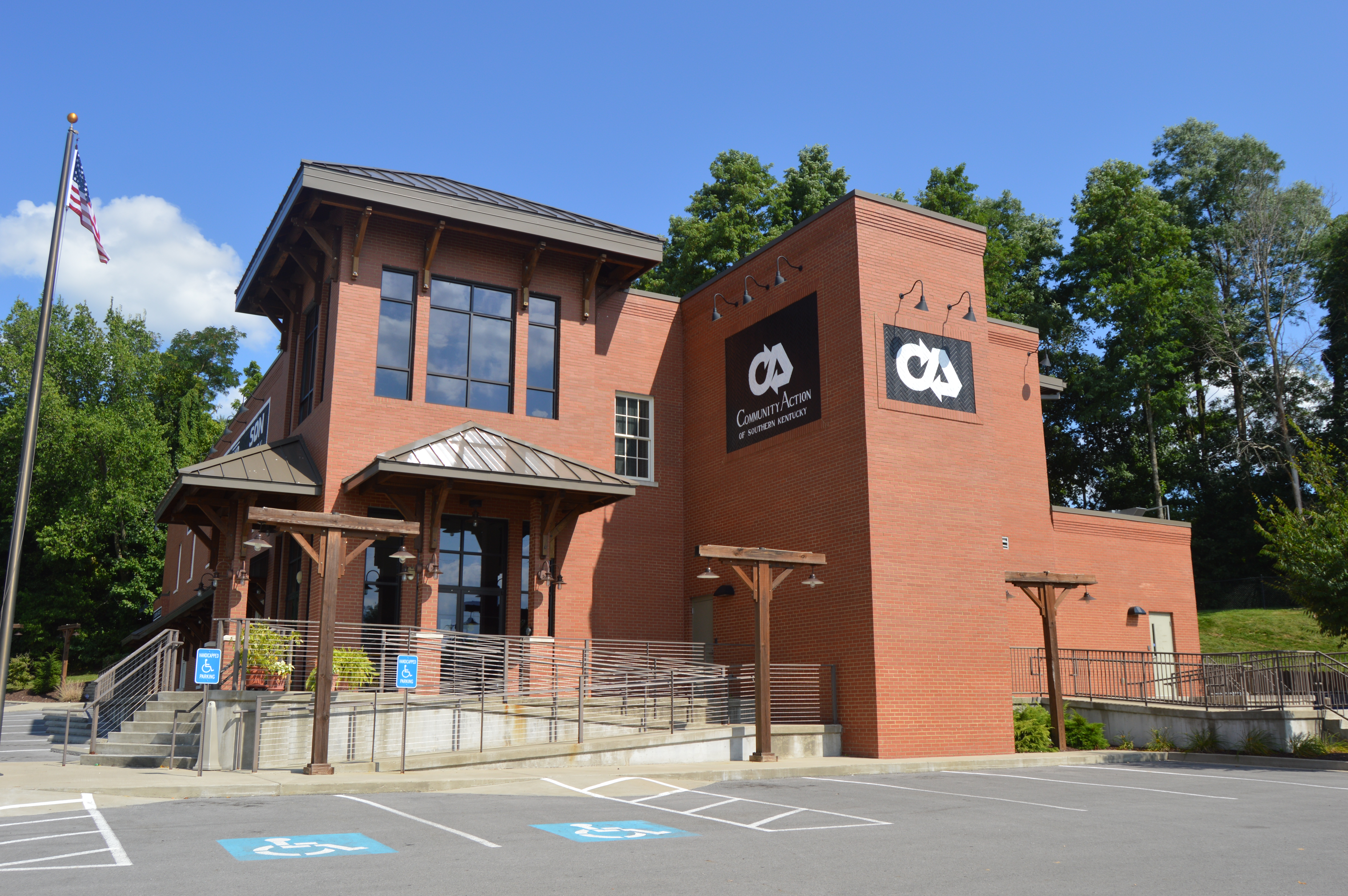

- Location within Kentucky Location within the United States
- Location: Old East Main Street at 7th Street, Scottsville, Kentucky, U.S.
- Coordinates: 36°45′08″N 86°11′0″W
- Built: c. 1910
- NRHP reference No.: 01001253
- Added to NRHP: November 21, 2001

J. L. Turner and Son Building is a historic building in Scottsville, Allen County, Kentucky, United States.

== History ==
The building was completed c. 1910. It housed Davidson Bros, a wholesale and poultry firm, from 1916 to 1926. It was acquired by James Luther Turner and his son, Cal Turner, the co-founders of J. L. Turner & Son, in 1939.

By 1956, their business was named Dollar General; it later became a corporation traded on the New York Stock Exchange.

It has been listed on the National Register of Historic Places since November 21, 2001. It now houses Community Action of Southern Kentucky.
