= Halfway, Kentucky =

Unincorporated community in Kentucky, United States

Halfway
- Unincorporated community
- Location within the state of Kentucky Halfway (the United States)
- Coordinates: 36°47′44″N 86°17′45″W
- Country: United States
- State: Kentucky
- County: Allen
- Elevation: 741 ft (226 m)
- Time zone: UTC-6 (Central (CST))
  - Summer (DST): UTC-5 (CST)
- ZIP codes: 42150
- GNIS feature ID: 508160

Halfway (or Half Way) is an unincorporated community in Allen County, Kentucky, United States.

== History ==
A post office was established in the community in 1877. The place name Halfway (historically also spelled Half Way) is said to have referred to the town's location halfway between Bowling Green and the Tennessee state line on the horse-drawn mail route. The US Postal Service shows the Halfway post office as being in operation from 1928 until 1992, when service was suspended, and discontinued in 1997 when it was converted to a community post office of Scottsville, Kentucky.
