= Mary Noka Hood =

American microbiologist and professor

- Born: November 24, 1907
- Education: University of Michigan
- Scientific career
- Thesis: Trypanosoma equiperdum, Trypanosoma brucei and Trypanosoma hippicum infections in laboratory animals, chick embryos and chickens (1941)

Mary Noka Hood is a microbiologist known for her work on trypanosomes, soil sterilization, and bacterial aerosols.

== Education and career ==
Hood grew up in Scottsville, Kentucky. Hood received a B.S. (1933) and an M.S. (1936) from West Kentucky State Teacher's College. She earned her Ph.D. from the University of Michigan in 1945.

In 1938 she started working at Florida State College for Women, and by 1947 she was promoted to full professor in the department of zoology and bacteriology. From 1947 until 1956 she held the position of head of the department of bacteriology. When she retired in 1972 she was awarded emeritus status.

Hood was on the state board of examiners in the basic sciences, a job she would hold for 23 years.

Hood was one of nine women who sued Florida State University in 1972. The women noted that Florida State had discrimated against women in hiring, promotion, pay, job assignments, and tenure. In 1978 four of the women received back pay from Florida State University as part of a settlement which determined that women were paid less than men who held comparable positions.

Hood died in 1986.

== Selected publications ==
- Hood, Mary Noka (1949-05-01). "Trypanosoma Equiperdum, Trypanosoma Brucei and Trypanosoma Hippicum Infections in Avian Hosts". The American Journal of Tropical Medicine and Hygiene. s1-29 (3): 379–387. doi:10.4269/ajtmh.1949.s1-29.379.
- Hood, M. N. (1949). "Trypanosoma equiperdum, Trypanosoma brucei and Trypanosoma hippicum infections in laboratory animals". The American Journal of Tropical Medicine and Hygiene. 29 (3): 269–277. ISSN 0002-9637. PMID 18236598.
