= The Tabernacle (Scottsville, Kentucky) =

- Tabernacle, The
- U.S. National Register of Historic Places
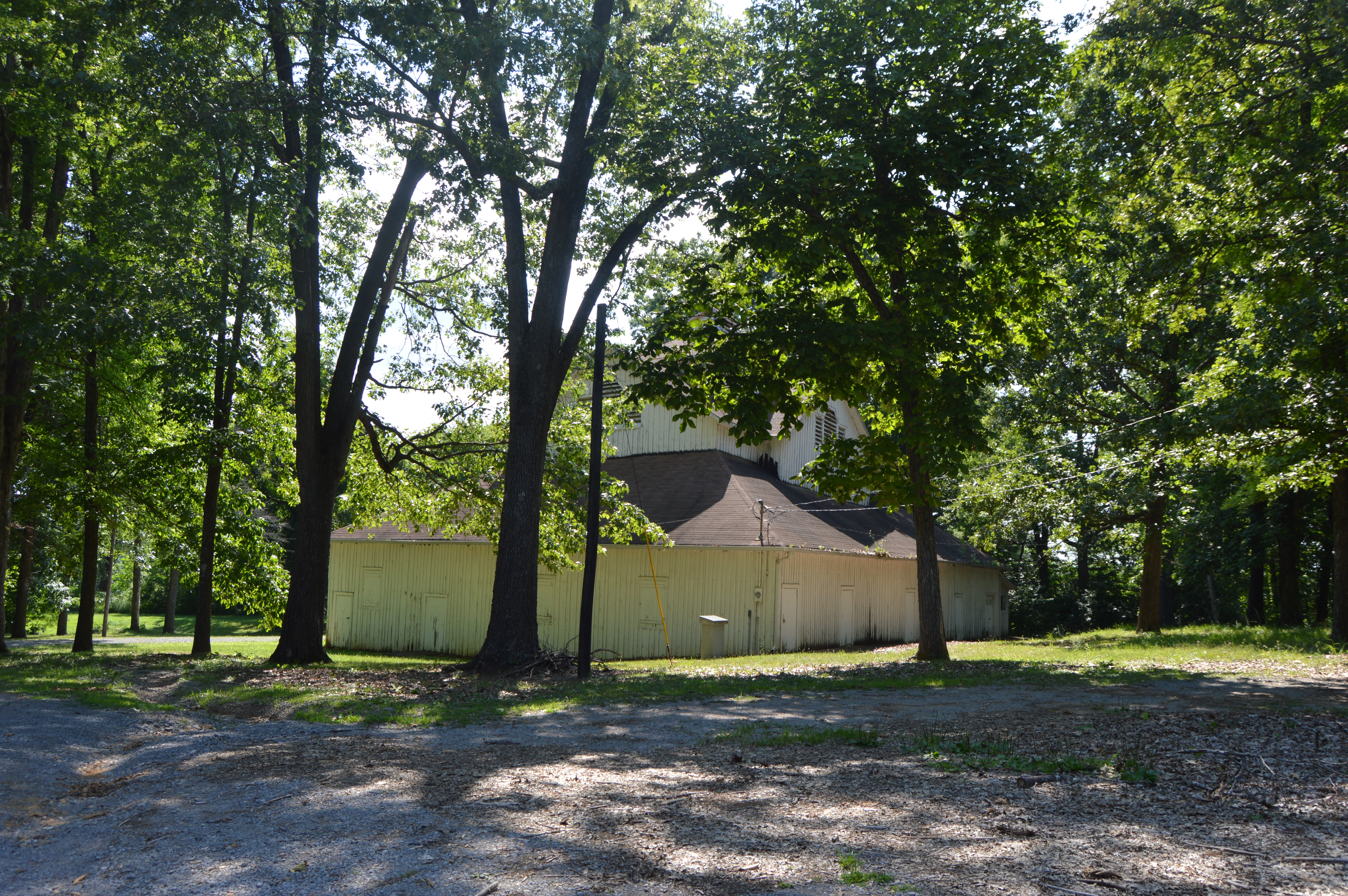

- Location within Kentucky Location within the United States
- Location: 829 Holland Rd., Scottsville, Kentucky
- Coordinates: 36°44′44″N 86°10′58″W
- Area: 6 acres (2.4 ha)
- Built: 1912
- Built by: Guthrie, Jim M.
- NRHP reference No.: 01000800
- Added to NRHP: August 2, 2001

The Tabernacle in Scottsville, Kentucky was built in 1912. It was listed on the National Register of Historic Places in 2001.

It is a large wood-frame square-plan structure constructed by J. M. Guthrie to be "used for revivals, church association meetings and conferences, singing conventions and 'meetings for all good purposes.'" It was originally open on one side until it was enclosed in 1938 as part of a National Youth Administration project during the Depression. In Methodism, a "tabernacle" serves as the center of a camp meeting.
