= Todd Vasos =

American businessman

Todd J. Vasos
- Born: 1961 (age 64–65); Wilmington, North Carolina, U.S.
- Spouse: Sandy Vasos
- Children: 5

Todd J. Vasos is an American businessman. He has been the CEO of Dollar General since October 2023, and from June 2015 to November 2022.

Vasos grew up in Wilmington, North Carolina and graduated from Hoggard High School in 1979. He earned a bachelor’s degree in marketing from Western Carolina University in 1984.
