= Edward and Julia Satterfield House =

Historic house in Kentucky, United States

- U.S. National Register of Historic Places
- Location within Kentucky Location within the United States
- Location: 10085 Bowling Green Rd., near Scottsville, Kentucky
- Coordinates: 36°49′59″N 86°19′11″W
- Area: less than one acre
- Built: 1902
- Architectural style: Late Victorian, Queen Anne
- NRHP reference No.: 05001304
- Added to NRHP: November 25, 2005

The Edward and Julia Satterfield House, near Scottsville, Kentucky, was built starting in 1902. It was listed on the National Register of Historic Places in 2005.

Edward Satterfield, a mortician, operated a funeral home out of the house. It has been described as "a good example of a Queen Anne style house constructed out of yellow poplar."
