= Allen County, Kentucky =

County in Kentucky, United States

- County
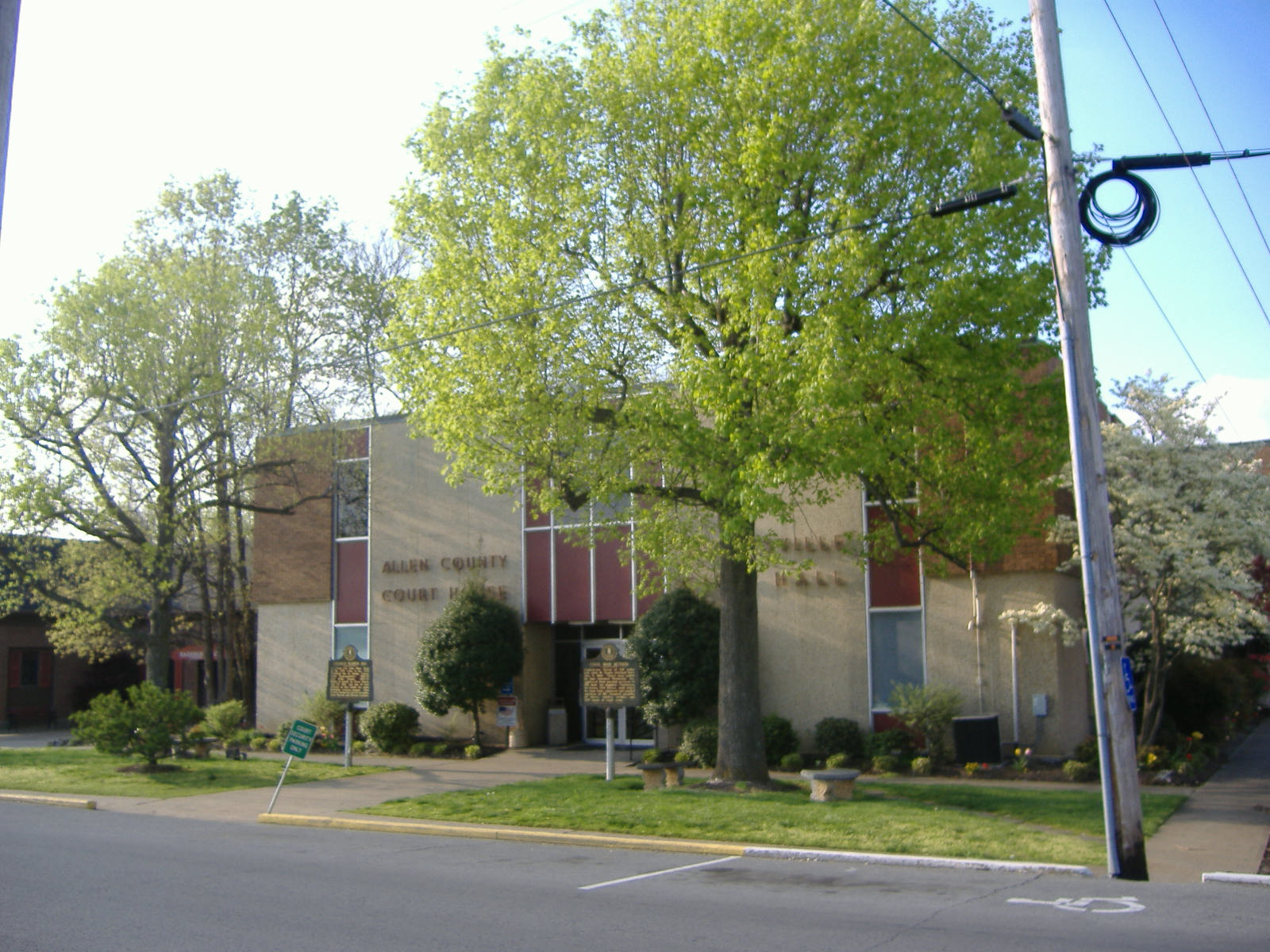
- Allen County Courthouse in Scottsville

- Location within the U.S. state of Kentucky
- Coordinates: 36°45′N 86°11′W
- Country: United States
- State: Kentucky
- Founded: 1815
- Named for: John Allen
- Seat: Scottsville
- Largest city: Scottsville

Government
  - Judge/Executive: Dennis Harper (R)

Area
  - Total: 352 sq mi (910 km^{2})
  - Land: 344 sq mi (890 km^{2})
  - Water: 7.5 sq mi (19 km^{2}) 2.1%

Population (2020)
  - Total: 20,588
  - Estimate (2025): 22,536 ▲
  - Density: 59.8/sq mi (23.1/km^{2})
- Time zone: UTC−6 (Central)
  - Summer (DST): UTC−5 (CDT)
- Congressional district: 1st
- Website: www.allencountykentucky.com

Allen County is a county located in the U.S. state of Kentucky. As of the 2020 census, the population was 20,588. Its county seat and only municipality is Scottsville. The county is named for Colonel John Allen, a state senator and soldier who was killed leading the 1st Regiment of Kentucky Rifleman at the Battle of Frenchtown, Michigan during the War of 1812. Allen County was a dry county until 2023, when it voted to legalize the sale of alcohol. It was formed in 1815 from parts of Barren and Warren counties. Allen County is included in the Bowling Green, KY Metropolitan Statistical Area.

== History ==
Allen County was established in 1815 from land given by Barren and Warren counties. A courthouse fire in 1902 resulted in the loss of some county records.

== Geography ==
According to the United States Census Bureau, the county has a total area of 352 square miles (910 km^{2}), of which 344 square miles (890 km^{2}) is land and 7.5 square miles (19 km^{2}) (2.1%) is water.

=== Adjacent counties ===
- Warren County northwest
- Barren County northeast
- Monroe County east
- Macon County, Tennessee southeast
- Sumner County, Tennessee southwest
- Simpson County west

== Demographics ==
Historical population
Census	Pop.	Note	%±
1820	5,327		—
1830	6,485		21.7%
1840	7,329		13.0%
1850	8,742		19.3%
1860	9,187		5.1%
1870	10,296		12.1%
1880	12,089		17.4%
1890	13,692		13.3%
1900	14,657		7.0%
1910	14,882		1.5%
1920	16,761		12.6%
1930	15,180		−9.4%
1940	15,496		2.1%
1950	13,787		−11.0%
1960	12,269		−11.0%
1970	12,598		2.7%
1980	14,128		12.1%
1990	14,628		3.5%
2000	17,800		21.7%
2010	19,956		12.1%
2020	20,588		3.2%
2025 (est.)	22,536	▲	9.5%
U.S. Decennial Census; 1790-1960 1900-1990; 1990-2000 2010-2020

=== 2020 census ===
As of the 2020 census, the county had a population of 20,588. The median age was 40.9 years. 24.0% of residents were under the age of 18 and 17.4% of residents were 65 years of age or older. For every 100 females there were 98.1 males, and for every 100 females age 18 and over there were 96.2 males age 18 and over.

The racial makeup of the county was 92.9% White, 1.0% Black or African American, 0.2% American Indian and Alaska Native, 0.2% Asian, 0.0% Native Hawaiian and Pacific Islander, 1.2% from some other race, and 4.4% from two or more races. Hispanic or Latino residents of any race comprised 2.8% of the population.

22.5% of residents lived in urban areas, while 77.5% lived in rural areas.

There were 8,009 households in the county, of which 31.6% had children under the age of 18 living with them and 23.9% had a female householder with no spouse or partner present. About 25.7% of all households were made up of individuals and 11.4% had someone living alone who was 65 years of age or older.

There were 9,208 housing units, of which 13.0% were vacant. Among occupied housing units, 73.2% were owner-occupied and 26.8% were renter-occupied. The homeowner vacancy rate was 1.6% and the rental vacancy rate was 5.5%.

=== 2000 census ===
As of the census of 2000, there were 17,800 people, 6,910 households, and 5,113 families residing in the county. The population density was 51 per square mile (20/km^{2}). There were 8,057 housing units at an average density of 23 per square mile (8.9/km^{2}). The racial makeup of the county was 97.62% White, 1.07% Black or African American, 0.16% Native American, 0.12% Asian, 0.01% Pacific Islander, 0.36% from other races, and 0.66% from two or more races. 0.83% of the population were Hispanic or Latino of any race.

There were 6,910 households, out of which 34.10% had children under the age of 18 living with them, 60.60% were married couples living together, 9.80% had a female householder with no husband present, and 26.00% were non-families. 23.10% of all households were made up of individuals, and 10.40% had someone living alone who was 65 years of age or older. The average household size was 2.55 and the average family size was 2.99.

In the county, the population was spread out, with 25.80% under the age of 18, 8.90% from 18 to 24, 28.50% from 25 to 44, 23.10% from 45 to 64, and 13.70% who were 65 years of age or older. The median age was 36 years. For every 100 females there were 95.90 males. For every 100 females age 18 and over, there were 93.30 males.

The median income for a household in the county was $31,238, and the median income for a family was $36,815. Males had a median income of $27,587 versus $22,659 for females. The per capita income for the county was $14,506. About 13.20% of families and 17.30% of the population were below the poverty line, including 23.40% of those under age 18 and 20.40% of those age 65 or over.

== Politics ==
United States presidential election results for Allen County, Kentucky
Year	Republican		Democratic		Third party(ies)	
Year	No.	%	No.	%	No.	%
1912	1,186	35.67%	1,366	41.08%	773	23.25%
1916	2,147	56.03%	1,647	42.98%	38	0.99%
1920	3,476	60.24%	2,255	39.08%	39	0.68%
1924	3,132	56.52%	2,373	42.83%	36	0.65%
1928	4,253	73.14%	1,562	26.86%	0	0.00%
1932	3,219	50.55%	3,116	48.93%	33	0.52%
1936	3,070	55.77%	2,422	44.00%	13	0.24%
1940	3,232	61.11%	2,036	38.49%	21	0.40%
1944	3,120	63.86%	1,742	35.65%	24	0.49%
1948	2,280	55.81%	1,605	39.29%	200	4.90%
1952	2,946	62.45%	1,750	37.10%	21	0.45%
1956	3,200	61.62%	1,975	38.03%	18	0.35%
1960	3,410	67.22%	1,663	32.78%	0	0.00%
1964	2,309	53.18%	2,023	46.59%	10	0.23%
1968	2,952	61.63%	927	19.35%	911	19.02%
1972	3,025	69.83%	1,259	29.06%	48	1.11%
1976	2,508	52.49%	2,231	46.69%	39	0.82%
1980	3,186	60.36%	2,010	38.08%	82	1.55%
1984	3,427	69.04%	1,521	30.64%	16	0.32%
1988	3,342	67.89%	1,573	31.95%	8	0.16%
1992	2,747	50.73%	2,040	37.67%	628	11.60%
1996	3,032	57.97%	1,781	34.05%	417	7.97%
2000	4,415	68.67%	1,950	30.33%	64	1.00%
2004	5,202	72.62%	1,923	26.85%	38	0.53%
2008	5,258	71.15%	2,024	27.39%	108	1.46%
2012	5,184	73.01%	1,808	25.46%	108	1.52%
2016	6,466	79.87%	1,349	16.66%	281	3.47%
2020	7,587	81.02%	1,642	17.54%	135	1.44%
2024	7,824	83.07%	1,505	15.98%	89	0.94%

Allen County, like most of Kentucky, is increasingly solidly Republican, although it was like those counties to its east in Appalachia never a part of the "Solid South". The last Democrat to carry the county in a presidential election was Woodrow Wilson in 1912, although a number of other elections have given Democratic majorities as recently as the 1999 gubernatorial election.

=== Elected officials ===
Elected officials as of January 3, 2025
U.S. House	James Comer (R)	KY 1
Ky. Senate	Max Wise (R)	16
Ky. House	Shawn McPherson (R)	22

=== Voter registration ===
Allen County Voter Registration & Party Enrollment as of July 2024
Political Party	Total Voters	Percentage
Republican	10,332	67.17%
Democratic	3,696	24.03%
Others	795	5.17%
Independent	475	3.09%
Libertarian	60	0.39%
Green	13	0.08%
Constitution	7	0.04%
Socialist Workers	3	0.02%
Reform	1	0.01%
Total	15,382	100%

=== Statewide elections ===
Previous gubernatorial elections results
Year	Republican	Democratic	Third parties
2023	70.40% 3,599	29.60% 1,513	0.00% 0
2019	67.13% 3,564	31.06% 1,649	1.81% 96
2015	69.00% 2,344	28.76% 977	2.24% 76
2011	53.21% 1,540	42.19% 1,221	4.60% 133
2007	51.79% 1,955	48.21% 1,820	0.00% 0
2003	64.99% 2,202	35.01% 1,186	0.00% 0
1999	28.68% 339	62.69% 741	8.63% 102
1995	57.95% 1,829	42.05% 1,327	0.00% 0

== Communities ==
=== City ===
- Scottsville (county seat)

=== Unincorporated communities ===
- Adolphus
- Allen Springs
- Alonzo
- Amos
- Butlersville
- Cedar Springs
- Chapel Hill
- Clare
- Fleet
- Forest Springs
- Gainesville
- Halfway
- Halifax
- Holland
- Maynard
- Meador
- Mount Aerial
- Mount Zion
- New Roe
- Oak Forest
- Petroleum
- Pope
- Red Hill
- Rodemer
- Settle
- Trammel
- Yesse

== Notable residents ==
- Mordecai Ham, an evangelist born in Allen County
- Jim McDaniels
- Charles Napier (actor)
- Norro Wilson
- R. H. Wilson, Oklahoma State Superintendent of Public Instruction
- Cal Turner Sr.

== See also ==
- Allen County Schools
- National Register of Historic Places listings in Allen County, Kentucky
- List of counties in Kentucky
