= Halifax, Kentucky =

Unincorporated community in Kentucky, United States

- Unincorporated community
- Location within Kentucky
- Coordinates: 36°49′42″N 86°14′32″W
- Country: United States
- State: Kentucky
- County: Allen
- Elevation: 725 ft (221 m)
- Time zone: UTC-6 (Central (CST))
  - Summer (DST): UTC-5 (CDT)
- Area codes: 270 & 364
- GNIS feature ID: 508161

Halifax is an unincorporated community in Allen County, Kentucky, United States. It is on U.S. Route 231 and Kentucky Route 1332.
