= Mount Zion, Kentucky =

Unincorporated community in Kentucky, United States

Mount Zion
- Unincorporated community
- Location within the state of Kentucky Mount Zion (the United States)
- Coordinates: 36°40′59″N 86°03′26″W
- Country: United States
- State: Kentucky
- County: Allen
- Elevation: 814 ft (248 m)
- Time zone: UTC−6 (CST)
  - Summer (DST): UTC−5 (CDT)
- ZIP codes: 42153
- GNIS feature ID: 498910

Mount Zion is a rural unincorporated community in southeastern Allen County, Kentucky, United States.
