= Forest Springs, Kentucky =

Unincorporated community in Kentucky, United States

Forest Springs
- Unincorporated community
- Location within the state of Kentucky Forest Springs (the United States)
- Coordinates: 36°39′32″N 86°09′40″W
- Country: United States
- State: Kentucky
- County: Allen
- Elevation: 755 ft (230 m)
- Time zone: UTC−6 (CST)
  - Summer (DST): UTC−5 (CDT)
- ZIP codes: 42164
- GNIS feature ID: 508022

Forest Springs is a rural unincorporated community in southern Allen County, Kentucky, United States.
