= Settle, Kentucky =

Unincorporated community in Kentucky, United States

- Unincorporated community
- Location within Kentucky
- Coordinates: 36°52′10″N 86°12′52″W
- Country: United States
- State: Kentucky
- County: Allen
- Elevation: 712 ft (217 m)
- Time zone: UTC-6 (Central (CST))
  - Summer (DST): UTC-5 (CDT)
- Area code: 270
- GNIS feature ID: 509032

Settle is an unincorporated community in Allen County, Kentucky, United States. Settle is located on Kentucky Route 234 10.1 miles (16.3 km) north of Scottsville. Big Spring School-Oliver Farmstead, which is listed on the National Register of Historic Places, is located in Settle. Kentucky Route 1533 begins at KY 234 (Cemetery Road) north of Settle and heads east as Meador Port Oliver Road.
