= Butlersville, Kentucky =

Unincorporated community in Kentucky, United States

Butlersville
- Unincorporated community
- Location within the state of Kentucky Butlersville (the United States)
- Coordinates: 36°47′01″N 86°18′47″W
- Country: United States
- State: Kentucky
- County: Allen
- Elevation: 531 ft (162 m)
- Time zone: UTC−6 (CST)
  - Summer (DST): UTC−5 (CDT)
- ZIP codes: 42164
- GNIS feature ID: 509631

Butlersville is a rural unincorporated community in northwest Allen County, Kentucky, United States.
