= Allen County Poor Farm =

- U.S. National Register of Historic Places
- Location: 3540 Holland Rd., Scottsville, Kentucky
- Coordinates: 36°43′37″N 86°08′31″W
- Area: 6.7 acres (2.7 ha)
- Built: 1936
- Built by: Works Progress Administration
- Architectural style: Colonial Revival
- NRHP reference No.: 91001662
- Added to NRHP: November 7, 1991

The Allen County Poor Farm in Scottsville, Kentucky was a Works Progress Administration project in 1936. It was listed on the National Register of Historic Places in 1991.

The poor house provided a place to live for indigent wards of the county; those able were required to work on the surrounding poor farm, which at one point was 200 acres (0.81 km^{2}) in size.

It is a modest five-bay building with "a very stylized 'institutional' Colonial Revival style. The building's style is plain and rather utilitarian but it does have some applied ornamentation. In fact it closely resembles school buildings constructed as part of public works projects during the same period and may indeed be an adaptation of an educational building floor plan."
