= New Roe, Kentucky =

Unincorporated community in Kentucky, United States

- Unincorporated community
- Location within Kentucky
- Coordinates: 36°39′57″N 86°22′57″W
- Country: United States
- State: Kentucky
- County: Allen
- Elevation: 715 ft (218 m)
- Time zone: UTC-6 (Central (CST))
  - Summer (DST): UTC-5 (CDT)
- GNIS feature ID: 508694

New Roe is an unincorporated community in Allen County, Kentucky, United States.
