= Pope, Kentucky =

Unincorporated community in Kentucky, United States

- Unincorporated community
- Location within Kentucky
- Coordinates: 36°45′45″N 86°20′23″W
- Country: United States
- State: Kentucky
- County: Allen
- Elevation: 732 ft (223 m)
- Time zone: UTC-6 (Central (CST))
  - Summer (DST): UTC-5 (CDT)
- GNIS feature ID: 508850

Pope is an unincorporated community in Allen County, Kentucky, United States.
