= Clare, Kentucky =

Unincorporated community in Kentucky, United States

Clare
- Unincorporated community
- Location within the state of Kentucky Clare (the United States)
- Coordinates: 36°42′54″N 86°23′41″W
- Country: United States
- State: Kentucky
- County: Allen
- Elevation: 732 ft (223 m)
- Time zone: UTC−6 (CST)
  - Summer (DST): UTC−5 (CDT)
- ZIP codes: 42134
- GNIS feature ID: 507705

Clare is a rural unincorporated community in southwest Allen County, Kentucky, United States.
