= Yesse, Kentucky =

Unincorporated community in Kentucky, United States

- Unincorporated community
- Location within Kentucky
- Coordinates: 36°51′11″N 86°11′50″W
- Country: United States
- State: Kentucky
- County: Allen
- Elevation: 702 ft (214 m)
- Time zone: UTC-6 (Central (CST))
  - Summer (DST): UTC-5 (CDT)
- GNIS feature ID: 509420

Yesse is an unincorporated community in Allen County, Kentucky, United States.
