= Chapel Hill, Kentucky =

Unincorporated community in Kentucky, United States

Chapel Hill
- Unincorporated community
- Location within the state of Kentucky Chapel Hill (the United States)
- Coordinates: 36°43′11″N 86°17′34″W
- Country: United States
- State: Kentucky
- County: Allen
- Elevation: 738 ft (225 m)
- Time zone: UTC−6 (CST)
  - Summer (DST): UTC−5 (CDT)
- ZIP codes: 42164
- GNIS feature ID: 507685

Chapel Hill is a rural unincorporated community in southwest Allen County, Kentucky, United States.
