= Dr. Pellie G. Graves House =

- U.S. National Register of Historic Places
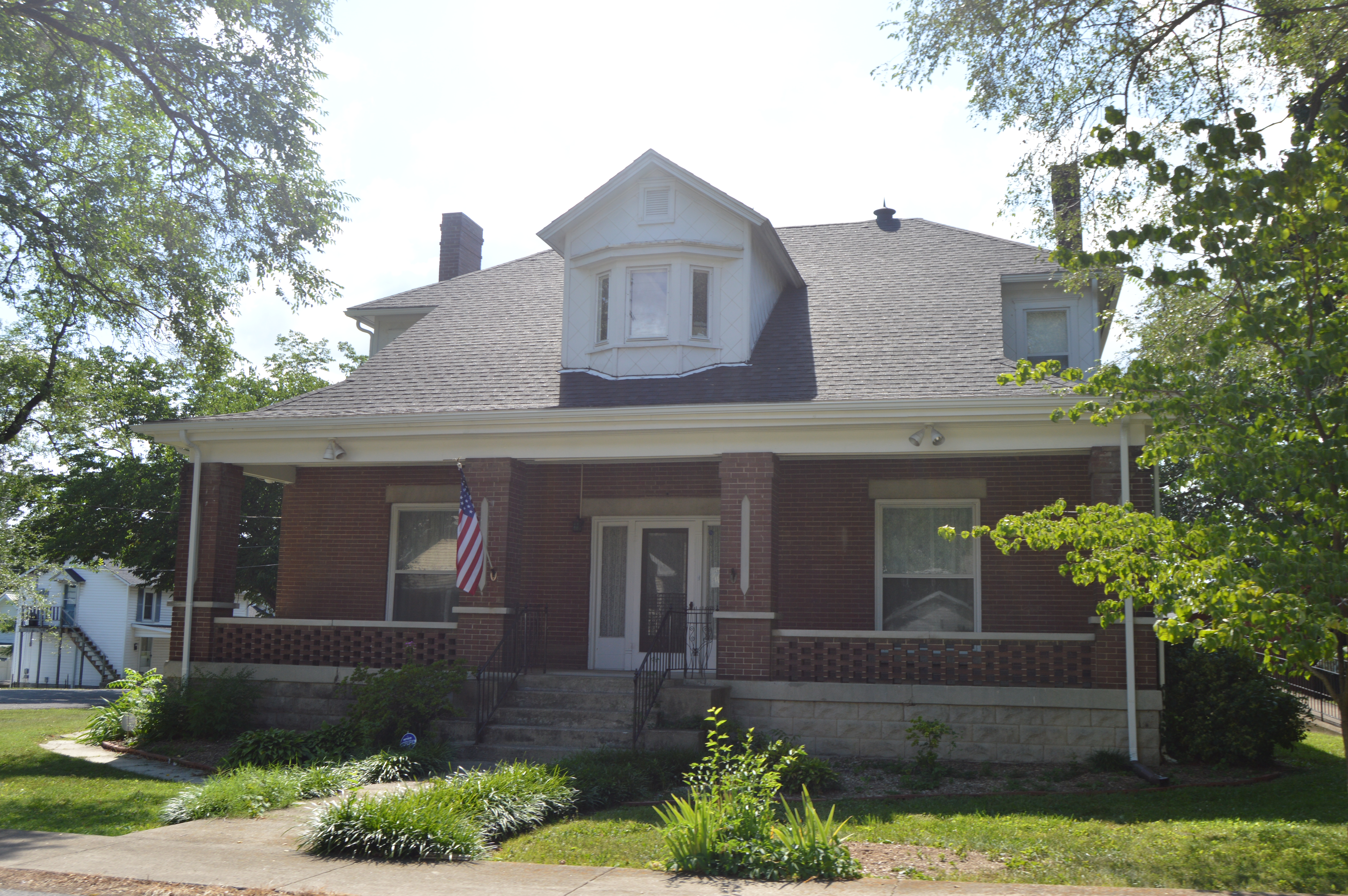

- Location within Kentucky Location within the United States
- Location: 301 N 4th St., Scottsville, Kentucky
- Coordinates: 36°45′17″N 86°11′10″W
- Area: less than one acre
- Architectural style: Bungalow/craftsman
- NRHP reference No.: 01000798
- Added to NRHP: August 2, 2001

The Dr. Pellie G. Graves House, at 301 N 4th St. in Scottsville, Kentucky, was built in 1917. It was listed on the National Register of Historic Places in 2001.

It was built before 1909. It is a two-story building, with elements of Craftsman and Prairie styling.

It was home and a doctor's office of Dr. Pellie G. Graves (d. 1925). Pellie and his brother Dr. Lattie Graves (d. 1942) opened a medical practice in Scottsville in 1915, including opening a modern hospital/infirmary with beds for 15 patients, the Graves Infirmary, at 217 Main St. Dr. Pellie saw patients there and also at his home, which he purchased in 1917; Dr. Lattie saw patients there and at another office on East Main Street.
