= Cal Turner Jr. =

American businessman and philanthropist (born 1940)

- Born: January 25, 1940 (age 86); Scottsville, Kentucky
- Education: Vanderbilt University
- Occupation: Businessman
- Spouse: Margaret Turner
- Children: Cal Turner III
- Parent(s): Cal Turner; Laura Katherine Goad

Hurley Calister "Cal" Turner Jr. (born January 25, 1940) is an American billionaire businessman and philanthropist. He served as the chairman and chief executive officer of Dollar General, a chain of low-cost variety stores founded by his father, Cal Turner Sr.

== Early life ==
Cal Turner Jr. was born on January 25, 1940, to Laura and Cal Turner. He is the son of Cal Turner, the founder of Dollar General. He has three siblings, including a sister, Laura Dugas. He is the oldest son. He grew up in Scottsville, Kentucky.

Turner graduated from Vanderbilt University, where he received a Bachelor of Arts degree in 1962. He served in the United States Navy from 1962 to 1965.

== Business career ==
Turner started his career at the family firm, Dollar General, in December 1965. He worked his way up and began by "sweeping the warehouse in the company." He became president in 1977 and chairman in 1988. He served as its chairman and chief executive officer until 2003. During his tenure, he forced both his father and his brother out of the business.

Turner served on the board of directors of First American Corporation and the First American National Bank. He serves on the CEO Council of Council Capital.

Turner is a billionaire.

== Philanthropy ==
Turner serves on the board of trust of his alma mater, Vanderbilt University. He endowed the Cal Turner Program For Moral Leadership in the Professions at the Owen Graduate School of Management at Vanderbilt University in 1994. With his sister Laura Dugas, Turner donated a pipe organ to the Blair School of Music at Vanderbilt University. Additionally, Turner serves on the board of trustees of Lindsey Wilson University, a private college in Columbia, Kentucky. In March 2015, he donated US$1.2 million through the Cal Turner Family Foundation to endow the Turner Family Center for Social Ventures at Vanderbilt's Owen School of Management.

Turner served on the board of trustees of Fisk University, a historically black university in Nashville; the PENCIL Foundation, a non-profit organization whose aim is to improve public education in Nashville, and the YMCA of Middle Tennessee. He also served on the board of trustees of the Easter Seals Tennessee, a non-profit organization for children with disabilities and special needs. Additionally, he serves on the Leadership Council of the Andrews Institute, a research center at the College of Leadership and Public Service of Lipscomb University. Through the Cal Turner Family Foundation, he donated US$3 million to build the Cal Turner Family Center, a conference center at Meharry Medical College, a United Methodist medical school in Nashville. Additionally, he established the Cal Turner Jr. Center for Church Leadership at Martin Methodist College, a United Methodist college in Pulaski, Tennessee.

Turner was the recipient of the Presidential Award for Private Sector Initiatives from President Ronald Reagan in 1988. Additionally, he was awarded the Stanley S. Kresge Award from the United Methodist Higher Education Foundation.

== Personal life ==
Turner had a wife, Margaret (who died in 2019), and has a son, Cal Turner, III. They resided in a home in Fieldstone Farms, a neighborhood of Franklin, Tennessee, near Nashville.

Turner is a member of the United Methodist Church. He plays the piano and pipe organ.

== Works ==
- Turner, Cal Jr.; Simbeck, Rob (2018). My Father's Business: The Small-Town Values That Built Dollar General Into a Billion-Dollar Company. New York City: Center Street. ISBN 9781478992981. OCLC 1003316282.
