= Cal Turner =

American businessman (1915–2000)

- Born: Hurley Calister Turner; May 28, 1915; Macon County, Tennessee, U.S.
- Died: November 20, 2000 (aged 85); Scottsville, Kentucky, U.S.
- Occupation: Businessman
- Spouse: Laura Katherine Goad
- Children: Laura Dugas; Cal Turner Jr. Betty Campbell; Steve Turner
- Parent(s): James Luther Turner; Josephine Marcum

Hurley Calister "Cal" Turner (May 28, 1915 – November 20, 2000) was an American businessman. He was the co-founder of Dollar General alongside his father.

== Early life ==
Cal Turner was born on May 28, 1915, in Macon County, Tennessee. His father, James Luther Turner, was a traveling salesman who, during the Great Depression, found success selling-off store inventories before the stores had to close down.

== Business career ==
Turner co-founded J. L. Turner & Son Wholesale with his father, J.L. Turner, in Scottsville, Kentucky, in 1939. It later became known as Dollar General, a chain of dollar stores. He listed it on the New York Stock Exchange in 1968. He retired in 1989. By the time of his death, it had "4,800 discount stores in 25 states."

== Philanthropy ==
Turner endowed the Turner Family Scholarships for Dollar General employees in 1999.

== Personal life ==
Turner married Laura Katherine Goad. They had four children: Laura Dugas, Cal Turner Jr., Betty Campbell, and Steve Turner. His wife predeceased him in 1988.

== Death ==
Turner died on November 20, 2000, in Scottsville, Kentucky.
