= Scottsville, Kentucky =

- City
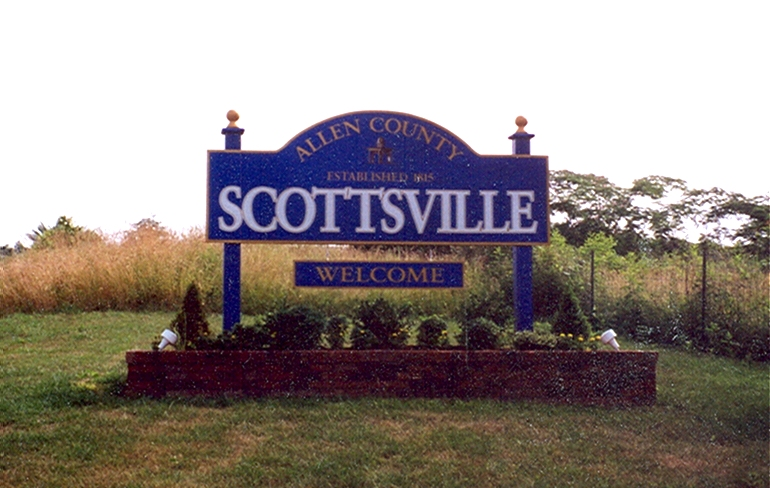
- Sign welcoming visitors to Scottsville

- Seal

- Location of Scottsville in Allen County, Kentucky.
- Coordinates: 36°45′5″N 86°11′34″W
- Country: United States
- State: Kentucky
- County: Allen
- Established: 1817
- Incorporated: 1860
- Named for: Gov. Charles Scott

Area
  - Total: 6.32 sq mi (16.36 km^{2})
  - Land: 6.30 sq mi (16.32 km^{2})
  - Water: 0.012 sq mi (0.03 km^{2})
- Elevation: 761 ft (232 m)

Population (2020)
  - Total: 4,299
  - Estimate (2024): 4,574
  - Density: 682.1/sq mi (263.35/km^{2})
- Time zone: UTC-6 (Central (CST))
  - Summer (DST): UTC-5 (CDT)
- ZIP code: 42164
- Area codes: 270 & 364
- FIPS code: 21-69114
- GNIS feature ID: 0503118
- Website: www.cityofscottsville.org

Scottsville is a home rule-class city in Allen County, Kentucky, in the United States. It is the seat of its county. The population was 4,299 during the 2020 United States census.

== History ==
The site along Bays Fork was settled in 1797 and developed into a stagecoach station. The town was laid off in 1816 and established the next year. It was named for Kentucky's 4th governor, Charles Scott. In the early 19th century, it was also known as Allen Court House and Scottville.

Scottsville was the birthplace of what would become the Dollar General nationwide chain of 15,000 stores, with J. L. Turner and his son Cal Turner Sr. opening their first department store there in 1945. In 1955, the Turners began to open more stores, and, in 1968, founded Dollar General Corporation or DOLGEN Corp.

== Geography ==
Scottsville is located at 36°45′5″N 86°11′34″W (36.751504, -86.192692). According to the United States Census Bureau, the city has a total area of 5.8 square miles (15 km^{2}), all of it land.

== Climate ==
The climate in this area is characterized by hot, humid summers and generally mild to cool winters. According to the Köppen Climate Classification system, Scottsville has a humid subtropical climate, abbreviated "Cfa" on climate maps.

Climate data for Scottsville, Kentucky (1991–2020 normals, extremes 1946–present)
Month	Jan	Feb	Mar	Apr	May	Jun	Jul	Aug	Sep	Oct	Nov	Dec	Year
Record high °F (°C)	77 (25)	81 (27)	86 (30)	94 (34)	94 (34)	106 (41)	108 (42)	104 (40)	104 (40)	94 (34)	84 (29)	77 (25)	108 (42)
Mean maximum °F (°C)	66.0 (18.9)	70.5 (21.4)	77.2 (25.1)	83.0 (28.3)	87.2 (30.7)	91.8 (33.2)	94.2 (34.6)	94.1 (34.5)	91.0 (32.8)	84.1 (28.9)	75.8 (24.3)	67.0 (19.4)	95.8 (35.4)
Mean daily maximum °F (°C)	45.1 (7.3)	50.2 (10.1)	59.0 (15.0)	69.7 (20.9)	76.8 (24.9)	83.8 (28.8)	87.0 (30.6)	86.5 (30.3)	80.8 (27.1)	70.4 (21.3)	58.3 (14.6)	48.4 (9.1)	68.0 (20.0)
Daily mean °F (°C)	35.4 (1.9)	39.6 (4.2)	47.9 (8.8)	57.4 (14.1)	65.6 (18.7)	72.7 (22.6)	76.2 (24.6)	75.2 (24.0)	69.1 (20.6)	58.4 (14.7)	47.4 (8.6)	39.0 (3.9)	57.0 (13.9)
Mean daily minimum °F (°C)	25.7 (−3.5)	28.9 (−1.7)	36.7 (2.6)	45.1 (7.3)	54.3 (12.4)	61.5 (16.4)	65.4 (18.6)	63.8 (17.7)	57.4 (14.1)	46.4 (8.0)	36.4 (2.4)	29.6 (−1.3)	45.9 (7.7)
Mean minimum °F (°C)	6.2 (−14.3)	10.6 (−11.9)	18.7 (−7.4)	29.7 (−1.3)	39.1 (3.9)	51.1 (10.6)	57.7 (14.3)	56.1 (13.4)	44.3 (6.8)	31.5 (−0.3)	20.9 (−6.2)	13.1 (−10.5)	3.3 (−15.9)
Record low °F (°C)	−20 (−29)	−12 (−24)	−1 (−18)	18 (−8)	30 (−1)	40 (4)	50 (10)	40 (4)	31 (−1)	22 (−6)	−6 (−21)	−15 (−26)	−20 (−29)
Average precipitation inches (mm)	4.06 (103)	4.42 (112)	4.83 (123)	4.85 (123)	5.45 (138)	5.08 (129)	4.79 (122)	4.05 (103)	4.16 (106)	3.79 (96)	3.81 (97)	4.68 (119)	53.97 (1,371)
Average snowfall inches (cm)	3.0 (7.6)	2.4 (6.1)	1.0 (2.5)	0.0 (0.0)	0.0 (0.0)	0.0 (0.0)	0.0 (0.0)	0.0 (0.0)	0.0 (0.0)	0.0 (0.0)	0.1 (0.25)	1.1 (2.8)	7.6 (19)
Average precipitation days (≥ 0.01 in)	11.9	11.2	11.8	11.1	11.3	10.4	9.5	8.4	7.8	8.1	9.1	11.8	122.4
Average snowy days (≥ 0.1 in)	1.9	1.6	0.6	0.0	0.0	0.0	0.0	0.0	0.0	0.0	0.1	0.7	4.9
Source: NOAA

== Demographics ==
Historical population
Census	Pop.	Note	%±
1840	215		—
1850	400		86.0%
1860	403		0.8%
1870	217		−46.2%
1880	395		82.0%
1890	575		45.6%
1900	824		43.3%
1910	1,327		61.0%
1920	2,179		64.2%
1930	1,867		−14.3%
1940	1,797		−3.7%
1950	2,060		14.6%
1960	3,324		61.4%
1970	3,584		7.8%
1980	4,278		19.4%
1990	4,278		0.0%
2000	4,327		1.1%
2010	4,226		−2.3%
2020	4,299		1.7%
2024 (est.)	4,574		6.4%
U.S. Decennial Census

=== 2020 census ===
As of the 2020 census, Scottsville had a population of 4,299. The median age was 38.9 years. 24.0% of residents were under the age of 18 and 16.6% of residents were 65 years of age or older. For every 100 females there were 91.3 males, and for every 100 females age 18 and over there were 86.9 males age 18 and over.

93.9% of residents lived in urban areas, while 6.1% lived in rural areas.

There were 1,838 households in Scottsville, of which 30.1% had children under the age of 18 living in them. Of all households, 36.7% were married-couple households, 19.4% were households with a male householder and no spouse or partner present, and 36.6% were households with a female householder and no spouse or partner present. About 34.5% of all households were made up of individuals and 12.7% had someone living alone who was 65 years of age or older.

There were 2,063 housing units, of which 10.9% were vacant. The homeowner vacancy rate was 2.6% and the rental vacancy rate was 5.3%.

Racial composition as of the 2020 census
Race	Number	Percent
White	3,891	90.5%
Black or African American	98	2.3%
American Indian and Alaska Native	12	0.3%
Asian	23	0.5%
Native Hawaiian and Other Pacific Islander	2	0.0%
Some other race	61	1.4%
Two or more races	212	4.9%
Hispanic or Latino (of any race)	144	3.3%

=== 2010 census ===
As of the 2010 census, there were 4,226 people, 1,861 households, and 1,130 families residing in the city. The population density was 728.6 people per square mile (281.3 people/km^{2}). There were 2,066 housing units at an average density of 356.2 units per square mile (137.5 units/km^{2}). The racial makeup of the city was 94.5% White, 2.5% African American, 0.3% Native American, 0.2% Asian, 0.0% Pacific Islander, 0.4% from other races, and 2.1% from two or more races. Hispanic or Latino of any race were 1.4% of the population.

There were 1,861 households, out of which 26.6% had children under the age of 18 living with them, 38.2% were married couples living together, 17.7% had a female householder with no husband present, and 39.3% were non-families. 35.0% of all households were made up of individuals living alone, and 14.5% had someone living alone who was 65 years of age or older. The average household size was 2.22 and the average family size was 2.83.

In the city, the population was spread out, with 23.2% under the age of 18, 7.0% from 20 to 24, 24.6% from 25 to 44, 25.6% from 45 to 64, and 16.5% who were 65 years of age or older. The median age was 38.6 years. For every 100 females, there were 86.66 males. For every 100 females age 18 and over, there were 84.54 males.

The median income for a household in the city was $24,960, and the median income for a family was $36,711. Males had a median income of $31,367 versus $29,750 for females. The per capita income for the city was $13,555. About 20.3% of families and 28.5% of the population were below the poverty line, including 35.0% of those under age 18 and 13.5% of those age 65 or over.

== Mennonite community ==
Scottsville is home of the main settlement of the Noah Hoover Mennonites, also called "Scottsville Mennonites", a branch of Old Order Mennonites. They did not emerge from a single division, as most other Anabaptist groups, but have a long history of divisions and mergers. They moved to Scottsville in 1978, coming from Snyder County, Pennsylvania.

== Education ==
Scottsville's public schools are part of the Allen County Schools school district. The district has one elementary school, one intermediate school, one middle school, and one high school.

Ninth through twelfth grade students attend Allen County-Scottsville High School.

Scottsville has a lending library, the Allen County Public Library.

== Media ==
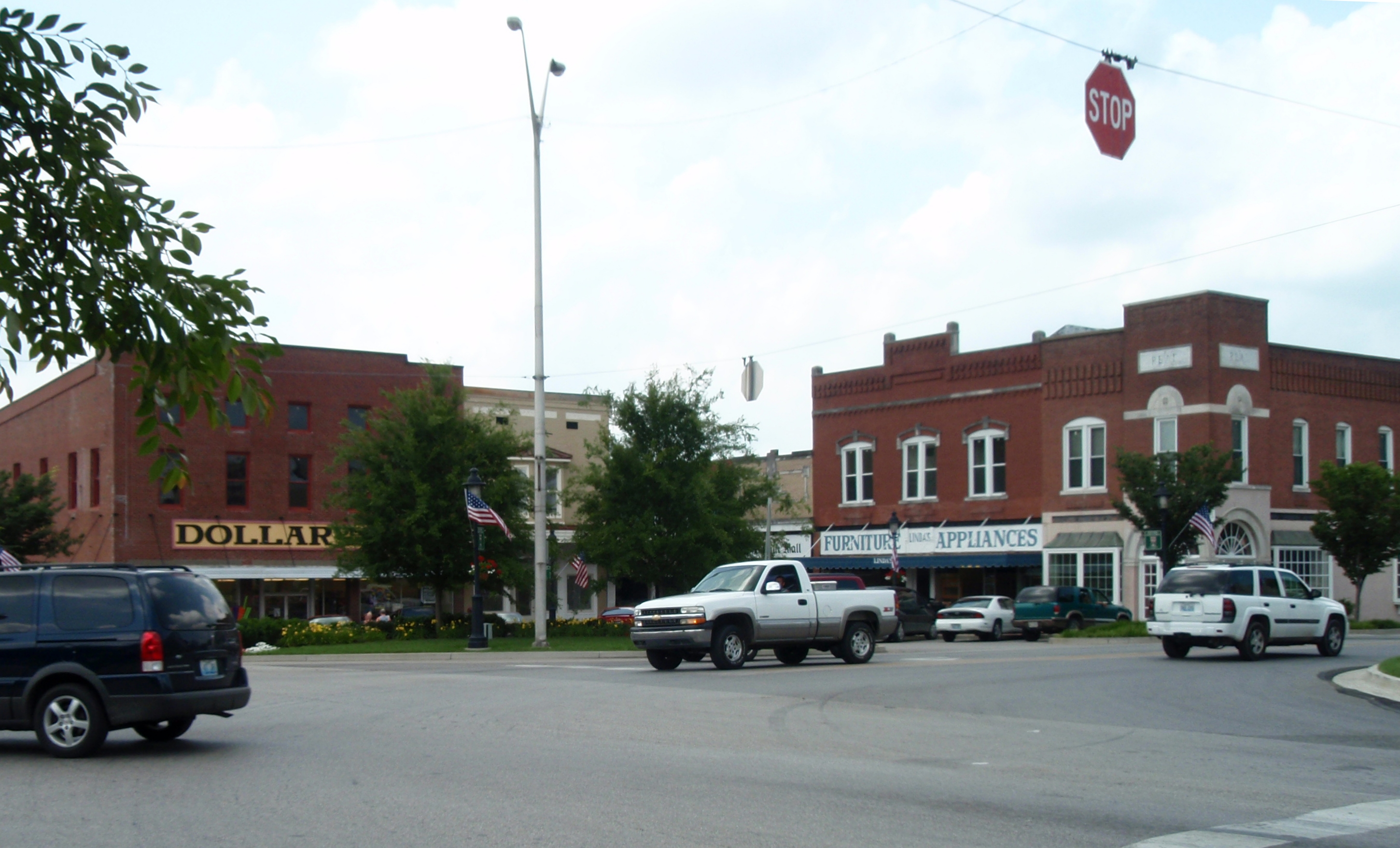
Scottsville's square contains a handful of shops.

Scottsville is home to a weekly newspaper, the Citizen-Times, which was founded in 1890. Two radio stations, WVLE (99.3 FM) and WLCK (1250 AM). WVLE recently changed broadcast formats from country to a variety of adult contemporary hits from the past three decades. "The All New Love FM," as the station is now known, also has twice daily news segments covering Scottsville and the rest of Allen County.

== Notable people ==
- Ed Douglas - bassist of The Scottsville Squirrel Barkers
- Mordecai Ham - Evangelist (born near Scottsville)
- Mary Noka Hood (1907 - 1986)- Microbiologist and professor at Florida State University
- Jim McDaniels - Professional basketball player
- Lattie Moore - Singer, songwriter and musician; Rockabilly Hall of Fame member
- Charles Napier - Actor and voice actor who was the voice of Duke Phillips
- Harry Pulliam - Sixth President of the National League (Major League Baseball) and Democratic Kentucky legislator
- J.L. Turner - Founder of J.L. Turner and Son, the predecessor of Dollar General, in Scottsville
- Cal Turner - Founder of Dollar General
- Cal Turner Jr. - Former CEO of Dollar General and son of Cal Turner
- Norro Wilson - Nashville songwriter and record producer
- Hillbilly Jim (James Morris) - Professional wrestler
