= 2011 local electoral calendar =

This local electoral calendar for the year 2011 lists the subnational elections held in 2011 in the de jure and de facto sovereign states. By-elections and sub-national referendums are also included.

== January ==
- 2 January: Federated States of Micronesia, Kosrae, Governor and Lieutenant Governor (2nd round)
- 20 January: Barbados, St. John, House of Assembly by-election
- 26 January: Bangladesh, Brahmanbaria-3 and Habiganj-1, House of the Nation by-elections

== February ==
- 6 February: Brazil, Dourados, mayoral special election
- 13 February: Switzerland
  - Aargau, referendums
  - Appenzell Ausserrhoden, referendum
  - Basel-Landschaft, referendum
  - Basel-Stadt, referendums
  - Bern, referendums
  - Geneva, referendums
  - Lucerne, referendum
  - Nidwalden, referendum
  - Schaffhausen, referendum
  - Solothurn, referendums
  - St. Gallen, referendums
  - Thurgau, referendums
  - Uri, referendums
  - Zürich, referendums
- 20 February: Hamburg (Germany), Parliament
- 22 February: United States
  - Chicago, Mayor and City Council (1st round)
  - Kansas City, MO, Mayor and City Council (1st round)

== March ==
- 1 March: United States
  - Oklahoma City, City Council (1st round)
  - Tampa, Mayor and City Council (1st round)
  - Wichita, Mayor and City Council (1st round)
- 2 March: Netherlands, Provincial
- 3 March: Wales (United Kingdom), Devolution referendum
- 8 March:
  - Federated States of Micronesia, Chuuk, House of Representatives
  - United States, Los Angeles, City Council (1st round)
- 12 March: Philippines, Cagayan's 2nd district special election
- 13 March: Catamarca (Argentina), Governor, Chamber of Deputies and Senate
- 15 March: United States, Miami-Dade County, Mayor recall election
- 17 March: Sri Lanka, Local elections
- 19 March: Jordan, Amman's 1st district, House of Representatives by-election
- 20 March:
  - Saxony-Anhalt (Germany), Diet
  - Chubut (Argentina), Governor and Legislature
- 20 and 27 March: France, Cantonal elections
- 22 March: United States
  - Jacksonville, Mayor and City Council (1st round)
  - Kansas City, MO, Mayor and City Council (2nd round)
  - Tampa, Mayor and City Council (2nd round)
- 26 March: New South Wales (Australia), Parliament
- 27 March:
  - Germany
    - Baden-Württemberg, Parliament
    - Frankfurt, City Council and Borough Councils
    - Rhineland-Palatinate, Parliament
  - Switzerland, Basel-Landschaft, Executive Council and Landrat

== April ==
- 3 April: Switzerland, Zürich, Executive Council and Cantonal Council
- 4 April: Jamaica, Saint Catherine South Western, House of Representatives by-election
- 5 April: United States
  - Anchorage, Assembly
  - Chicago, City Council (2nd round)
  - Colorado Springs, Mayor (1st round) and City Council
  - Las Vegas, Mayor and City Council (1st round)
  - Oklahoma City, City Council (2nd round)
  - St. Louis, Board of Aldermen
  - Wichita, Mayor and City Council (2nd round)
- 10 April:
  - Salta (Argentina), Governor, Chamber of Deputies and Senate
  - Japan, Local elections (1st phase, Prefectures and Designated cities)
  - Switzerland, Ticino, Council of State and Grand Council
- 16 April: Switzerland, Lucerne, Executive Council (1st round) and Cantonal Council
- 24 April: Japan, Local elections (2nd phase, Municipalities)

== May ==
- 1 May: Switzerland
  - Appenzell Innerrhoden
    - Council of States by-election
    - Landsgemeinde
  - Glarus, Landsgemeinde
- 3 May: United States, Denver, Mayor and City Council (1st round)
- 5 May: United Kingdom:
  - Local elections
  - Wales, National Assembly
  - Northern Ireland, Assembly
  - Scotland, Parliament
- 8 May:
  - San Juan (Argentina), Referendum
  - Albania, Local elections
  - India, Bastar and Kadapa, House of the People by-elections
- 13 May (results): India:
  - Assam, Legislative Assembly
  - Kerala, Legislative Assembly
  - Pondicherry, Legislative Assembly
  - Tamil Nadu, Legislative Assembly
  - West Bengal, Legislative Assembly
- 14 May: United States
  - Arlington, Mayor and City Council (1st round)
  - Austin, City Council (1st round)
  - Dallas, Mayor and City Council
  - Fort Worth, Mayor and City Council (1st round)
  - San Antonio, Mayor and City Council (1st round)
- 15 May: Switzerland
  - Aargau, referendum
  - Basel-Stadt, referendums
  - Bern, referendum
  - Fribourg, referendum
  - Geneva, referendums
  - Jura, referendums
  - Lucerne, referendum
  - Schwyz, referendums
  - Thurgau, referendums
  - Uri, referendum
  - Vaud, referendums
  - Zürich, referendums
- 17 May: United States
  - Colorado Springs, Mayor (2nd round)
  - Jacksonville, Mayor and City Council (2nd round)
  - Los Angeles, City Council (2nd round)
- 18 May: South Africa, municipal elections
- 21 May: Switzerland, Lucerne, Executive Council (2nd round)
- 22 May:
  - Bremen (Germany), Lander parliament
  - Spain, Local and regional
- 24 May: United States, Miami-Dade County, Mayor (1st round)
- 28 May: Philippines, Ilocos Sur's 1st district special election
- 29 May: La Rioja (Argentina), Governor and Legislature

== June ==
- 5 June: Switzerland, Ticino, referendums
- 7 June: United States
  - Denver, Mayor and City Council (2nd round)
  - Las Vegas, Mayor and City Council (2nd round)
- 11 June: United States, San Antonio, City Council (2nd round)
- 12 June: Neuquén (Argentina), Governor and Legislature
- 18 June: United States
  - Arlington, City Council (2nd round)
  - Austin, City Council (2nd round)
  - Fort Worth, Mayor and City Council (2nd round)
- 19 June: Switzerland
  - Basel-Stadt, referendum
  - Neuchâtel, referendums
- 26 June:
  - Argentina
    - Tierra del Fuego, Governor (1st round) and Legislature
    - Misiones, Governor and House of Representatives
  - United States, Cherokee Nation, Principal Chief, Deputy Chief and Tribal Council (1st round)
- 28 June: United States, Miami-Dade County, Mayor (2nd round)

== July ==
- 1 July: India, Jamshedpur, House of the People by-election
- 3 July:: Tierra del Fuego (Argentina), Governor (2nd round)
- 10 July: Buenos Aires City (Argentina), Chief of Government (1st round) and Legislature
- 23 July:
  - Sri Lanka, Local elections
  - United States, Cherokee Nation, Deputy Chief and Tribal Council (2nd round)
- 24 July: Santa Fé (Argentina), Governor, Chamber of Deputies and Senate
- 31 July: Buenos Aires City (Argentina), Chief of Government (2nd round)

== August ==
- 4 August: United States, Nashville, Mayor and Metropolitan Council (1st round)
- 7 August: Córdoba (Argentina), Governor and Legislature
- 16 August: United States, King County, Council (1st round)
- 24 August:
  - Federated States of Micronesia, Chuuk, Governor special election
  - Seoul (South Korea), free lunch referendum
- 28 August: Tucumán (Argentina), Governor and Legislature
- 30 August: United States, Phoenix, Mayor and City Council (1st round)

== September ==
- 4 September:
  - Mecklenburg-Vorpommern (Germany), Diet
  - Switzerland
    - Vaud, referendums
    - Zürich, referendums
- 11 September: Germany, Hanover Region, Assembly
  - Hanover, City Council and Borough Councils
- 12 September: Norway, Local elections
- 13 September: United States, Tulsa, City Council (1st round)
- 15 September: United States, Nashville, Metropolitan Council (2nd round)
- 18 September:
  - Argentina
    - Chaco, Governor and Chamber of Deputies
    - Corrientes, Chamber of Deputies
  - Berlin (Germany), House of Representatives
- 25 September:
  - Río Negro (Argentina), Governor and Legislature
  - Switzerland, Schaffhausen, referendums
- 27 September: United States, Boston, City Council (1st round)

== October ==
- 3 October:
  - Prince Edward Island (Canada), Legislative Assembly
  - Northwest Territories (Canada), Legislative Assembly
- 4 October:
  - Manitoba (Canada), Legislative Assembly
  - United States, Albuquerque, City Council
- 6 October:
  - Ontario (Canada), Legislative Assembly
  - United States, Memphis, Mayor and City Council (1st round)
- 8 October: Sri Lanka, Local elections
- 9 October: Madeira (Portugal), Legislative Assembly
- 11 October:
  - Newfoundland and Labrador (Canada), House of Assembly
  - Yukon (Canada), Legislative Assembly
  - United States, Raleigh, Mayor and City Council
- 13 October: India, Hisar, House of the People by-election
- 16 October: Åland (Finland), Lagting
- 23 October:
  - Argentina
    - Buenos Aires, Governor, Chamber of Deputies and Senate
    - Entre Ríos, Governor, Chamber of Deputies and Senate
    - Formosa, Governor and Chamber of Deputies
    - Jujuy, Governor and Legislature
    - La Pampa, Governor and Chamber of Deputies
    - Mendoza, Governor, Chamber of Deputies and Senate
    - San Juan, Governor and Chamber of Deputies
    - San Luis, Governor, Chamber of Deputies and Senate
    - Santa Cruz, Governor and Chamber of Deputies
  - Switzerland
    - Appenzell Ausserrhoden, Executive Council, Cantonal Council and referendum
    - Jura, referendum
    - Neuchâtel, Council of State
    - Obwalden, referendum
    - Thurgau, referendum
    - Valais, referendum
- 30 October:
  - Bangladesh, Narayanganj, Mayor and City Corporation
  - Colombia, Regional

== November ==
- 1 November: United States
  - Aurora, CO, Mayor and City Council
  - Miami, City Commission
- 6 November: Hong Kong (China), District councils
- 7 November: Saskatchewan (Canada), Legislative Assembly
- 8 November:
  - Federated States of Micronesia, Pohnpei, Governor and State Legislature
  - United States of America, Gubernatorial elections
    - Baltimore, Mayor and City Council
    - Boston, City Council (2nd round)
    - Charlotte, Mayor and City Council
    - Columbus, Mayor and City Council
    - Houston, Mayor and City Council (1st round)
    - Indianapolis, Mayor and City-County Council
    - King County, Council (2nd round)
    - Philadelphia, Mayor and City Council
    - Phoenix, Mayor and City Council (2nd round)
    - Pittsburgh, City Council
    - San Francisco, Mayor, District Attorney, Sheriff and Referendums
    - Seattle, City Council
    - Tucson, Mayor and City Council
    - Tulsa, City Council (2nd round)
- 10 November: United States, Memphis, City Council (2nd round)
- 13 November: Switzerland, Fribourg, Council of State (1st round) and Grand Council
- 27 November: Switzerland
  - Aargau, referendums
  - Basel-Landschaft, referendums
  - Basel-Stadt, referendums
  - Geneva, referendums
  - Lucerne, referendum
  - Neuchâtel, referendum
  - Schwyz, referendums
  - St. Gallen, referendum
  - Uri, Council of States by-election
  - Zug, referendums
  - Zürich, referendums
- 30 November: India, Kolkata Dakshin, House of the People by-election

== December ==
- 4 December: Switzerland, Fribourg, Council of State (2nd round)
- 10 December: United States, Houston, City Council (2nd round)
- 12 December: Syria, Local councils
- 29 December: Jordan, Karak's 5th district, House of Representatives by-election
