= List of elections in 2011 =

The following elections occurred in the year 2011.

- 2011 United Nations Security Council election
- 2011 national electoral calendar
- 2011 local electoral calendar

== Africa ==
- 2011 Beninese presidential election
- 2011 Beninese parliamentary election
- 2011 Cameroonian presidential election
- 2011 Cape Verdean parliamentary election
- 2011 Cape Verdean presidential election
- 2011 Central African Republic general election
- 2011 Chadian parliamentary election
- 2011 Chadian presidential election
- 2011 Democratic Republic of the Congo general election
- 2011 Djiboutian presidential election
- 2011–12 Egyptian parliamentary election
- 2011 Gabonese parliamentary election
- 2011 Gambian presidential election
- 2011 Ivorian parliamentary election
- 2011 Liberian constitutional referendum
- 2011 Liberian general election
- 2011 Moroccan general election
- 2011 Nigerian presidential election
- 2011 Nigerian parliamentary election
- 2011 Nigerien parliamentary election
- 2011 Nigerien presidential election
- 2011 São Toméan presidential election
- 2011 Seychellois parliamentary election
- 2011 Seychellois presidential election
- 2011 South African municipal election
- 2011 Southern Sudanese independence referendum
- 2011 Tunisian Constituent Assembly election
- 2011 Ugandan general election
- 2011 Zambian general election

== Asia ==
- 2011 Abkhazian local elections
- 2011 Abkhazian presidential election
- 2011 Bahraini parliamentary by-elections
- 2011 Cypriot legislative election
- 2011 Egyptian parliamentary election
- 2011 Emirati parliamentary election
- 2011 Kazakhstani presidential election
- 2011 Kyrgyzstani presidential election
- 2011 Laotian parliamentary election
- 2011 Laotian presidential election
- 2011 Myanmar presidential election
- 2011 North Korean local elections
- 2011 Omani general election
- 2011 Qatari municipal elections
- 2011 Russian legislative election
- 2011 Singaporean general election
- 2011 Singaporean presidential election
- 2011 Sri Lankan local elections
- 2011 Syrian local elections
- 2011 Thai general election
- 2011 Vietnamese legislative election

== Europe ==
- 2011 Albanian local elections
- 2011 Andorran parliamentary election
- 2011 Andorran local elections
- 2011 Bulgarian local elections
- 2011 Bulgarian presidential election
- 2011 Croatian parliamentary election
- 2011 Cypriot legislative election
- 2011 Danish parliamentary election
- 2011 Estonian parliamentary election
- 2011 Estonian presidential election
- 2011 Faroese general election
- 2011 Finnish parliamentary election
- 2011 Gibraltar general election
- 2011 Irish general election
- 2011 Irish presidential election
- 2011 Italian local elections
- 2011 Kazakhstani presidential election
- 2011 Kosovan presidential elections
- 2011 Latvian parliamentary election
- 2011 Latvian presidential election
- 2011 Liechtenstein local elections
- 2011 Macedonian parliamentary election
- 2011 Moldovan local election
- 2011–2012 Moldovan presidential election
- 2011 Norwegian local elections
- 2011 Russian legislative election
- 2011 Polish parliamentary election
- 2011 Portuguese presidential election
- 2011 Slovenian parliamentary election
- 2011 Spanish general election
- 2011 Spanish local elections
- 2011 Swiss federal election
- 2011 Turkish general election

=== Germany ===
- 2011 Baden-Württemberg state election
- 2011 Berlin state election
- 2011 Bremen state election
- 2011 Hamburg state election
- 2011 Mecklenburg-Vorpommern state election
- 2011 Rhineland-Palatinate state election
- 2011 Saxony-Anhalt state election

=== United Kingdom ===
- 2011 National Assembly for Wales election
- 2011 Northern Ireland Assembly election
- 2011 Oldham East and Saddleworth by-election
- 2011 Scottish Parliament election
- 2011 United Kingdom local elections

==== United Kingdom local ====
- 2011 United Kingdom local elections
- 2011 Northern Ireland local elections

===== English local =====
- 2011 Arun Council election
- 2011 Babergh Council election
- 2011 Broxbourne Council election
- 2011 Broxtowe Council election
- 2011 North Tyneside Council election
- 2011 Preston Council election

== North America ==
=== Canada ===
- 2011 Canadian federal election
- 2011 Manitoba general election
- 2011 New Brunswick New Democratic Party leadership election
- 2011 Progressive Conservative Party of Newfoundland and Labrador leadership election
- 2011 Newfoundland and Labrador general election
- 2011 Ontario general election
- 2011 Saskatchewan general election

=== United States ===
- 2011 United States elections
- 2011 Pennsylvania state elections

==== United States lieutenant gubernatorial ====
- 2011 Louisiana lieutenant gubernatorial election

==== United States gubernatorial ====
- 2011 Kentucky gubernatorial election
- 2011 Louisiana gubernatorial election
- 2011 Mississippi gubernatorial election
- 2011 United States gubernatorial elections
- 2011 West Virginia gubernatorial special election
- Opinion polling for the 2011 United States gubernatorial elections

==== United States mayoral ====
- 2011 Arlington mayoral election
- 2011 Baltimore mayoral election
- 2011 Birmingham, Alabama mayoral election
- 2011 Boise mayoral election
- 2011 Cary, North Carolina, mayoral election
- 2011 Charlotte mayoral election
- 2011 Chicago mayoral election
- 2011 Colorado Springs mayoral election
- 2011 Columbus, Ohio mayoral election
- 2011 Dallas mayoral election
- 2011 Denver mayoral election
- 2011 Des Moines mayoral election
- 2011 Durham mayoral election
- 2011 Evansville, Indiana, mayoral election
- 2011 Fayetteville, North Carolina mayoral election
- 2011 Flint mayoral election
- 2011 Fort Wayne mayoral election
- 2011 Fort Worth mayoral election
- 2011 Grand Rapids mayoral election
- 2011 Green Bay mayoral election
- 2011 Greensboro mayoral election
- 2011 Hartford mayoral election
- 2011 Houston mayoral election
- 2011 Indianapolis mayoral election
- 2011 Jacksonville mayoral election
- 2011 Kansas City mayoral election
- 2011 Knoxville mayoral election
- 2011 Las Vegas mayoral election
- 2011 Lincoln, Nebraska mayoral election
- 2011 Madison mayoral election
- 2011 Manchester, New Hampshire, mayoral election
- 2011 Memphis mayoral election
- 2011 Miami Beach mayoral election
- 2011 Miami-Dade County mayoral recall election
- 2011 Miami-Dade County mayoral special election
- 2011 Montgomery mayoral election
- 2011 Nashville mayoral election
- 2011 North Miami mayoral election
- 2011 Omaha mayoral recall election
- 2011 Philadelphia mayoral election
- 2011 Phoenix mayoral election
- 2011 Portland, Maine, mayoral election
- 2011 Raleigh mayoral election
- 2011 Rochester mayoral special election
- 2011 Salt Lake City mayoral election
- 2011 San Antonio mayoral election
- 2011 San Francisco mayoral election
- 2011 South Bend mayoral election
- 2011 Spokane mayoral election
- 2011 Springfield, Massachusetts mayoral election
- 2011 Tampa mayoral election
- 2011 Tucson mayoral election
- 2011 Wichita mayoral election
- 2011 Worcester, Massachusetts mayoral election
- 2011 Worcester, Massachusetts, mayoral election

==== Kentucky ====
- 2011 Kentucky Attorney General election
- 2011 Kentucky Auditor election
- 2011 Kentucky gubernatorial election
- 2011 Kentucky Secretary of State election
- 2011 Kentucky state treasurer election

== Oceania ==
- 2011 Kiribati parliamentary election
- 2011 Marshall Islands general election
- 2011 Micronesian parliamentary election
- 2011 Niuean general election
- 2011 Samoan general election

=== Australia ===
- 2011 Broadmeadows state by-election
- 2011 Clarence state by-election
- 2011 New South Wales state election

=== New Zealand ===
- 2011 Botany by-election
- 2011 New Zealand voting method referendum

==== New Zealand general ====
- 2011 New Zealand general election
- 50th New Zealand Parliament
- Opinion polling for the 2011 New Zealand general election

== South America ==
- 2011 Argentine general election
- 2011 Falkland Islands electoral system referendum
- 2011 Peruvian general election
