= 2011 Argentine provincial elections =

Note: the Argentine claims over part of the Southern Patagonian Ice Field, Antarctica, the Falkland Islands and South Georgia and the South Sandwich Islands (shown in orange) are disputed.

Most Provinces of Argentina held executive and legislative elections during 2011, electing governors and provincial legislatures. The only exceptions are Santiago del Estero Province, whose executive and legislative elections were elected in 2012; and Corrientes Province, whose gubernatorial election took place in 2013.

There were also simultaneous local elections, whereby a number of municipalities or Partidos elect municipal legislative officials (concejales), and in some cases also a mayor (or equivalent).

Although most of the elections took place on 23 October, the date of the Argentine general elections, each province stage the date of their elections according to provincial legislation.

== Electoral calendar ==
Some election dates are not yet confirmed (not listed), and some can vary according to new legislation.

=== March 13 ===
Catamarca

On 13 March 2011, Catamarca Province elected governor, 8 provincial senators, and 20 provincial deputies, thus renewing half of both chambers.

The ticket for governor and vice-governor is elected by simple majority on a direct election, for a 4-year period. They can be indefinitely re-elected. Provincial deputies are proportionally elected on a single district by D'Hondt method for a 4-year period and provincial senators are uninominally elected in each of the 16 Departments of Catamarca for a 4-year period. Both Deputies and Senators can also be indefinitely re-elected. Both chambers of the provincial legislature are renewed by halves every two years. Catamarca Electoral Law (Art. 90) establish the second Sunday of March, every two years, as the date for provincial elections. By law, women ought to hold at least 30% of the nominations, in expectant positions.

Incumbent Eduardo Brizuela del Moral (UCR), who was looking for his third consecutive mandate with the alliance Civic and Social Front of Catamarca (FCyS) that governed the province since 1991, surprisingly lost the election to Lucía Corpacci, a current National Senator and former Vice-Governor of Brizuela del Moral, who headed a Justicialist Party joint list (between both the pro- and the anti- national government factions). Lucía Corpacci will become the second elected female governor of an Argentine province ever.

Other candidates were: Liliana Barrionuevo, sister of union leader Luis Barrionuevo, for Primero Catamarca-PRO, Julio César Andrada for MST-Proyecto Sur, Ignacio Díaz for Polo Obrero-PO and Marcelo Cisternas for Concertación-FORJA.

From the 20 Chamber of Deputies seats and 8 Chamber of Senators seats to be renewed, the ruling coalition had 9 and 5 at stake. The departments which renewed senators were Ambato (FCyS), Andalgalá (FpV), Belén (FCyS), Capital (FpV), Fray M. Esquiú (FCyS), Pomán (FpV), Santa Rosa (FpV) and Valle Viejo (FCyS), each major political alliance electing 4 provincial senators.

Local executive and legislative elections were also held in 34 of 35 Intendencies of Catamarca. San Fernando del Valle de Catamarca, the capital and largest city (with about 50% of the total population) elected Raúl Jalil (FpV) as mayor.

Catamarca represents 0,89% of the national electorate. Voter turnout was about 70%.

Summary of the 13 March 2011 Catamarca provincial election results
Provisional results (98,72% of votes)
Governor candidate	Party or coalition	Governor		Deputies		Senators elected
Governor candidate	Party or coalition	Votes	Percent	Votes	Percent	Senators elected
Lucía Corpacci	Front for Victory Alliance	85,495	48,22%	78,401	44,22%	4
Eduardo Brizuela del Moral	Civic and Social Front of Catamarca	78,509	44,28%	74,969	42,29%	4
Liliana Barrionuevo	Primero Catamarca-PRO	4,003	2,28%	4,727	2,67%	
Julio César Andrada	MST-Proyecto Sur	2,516	1,42%	2,964	1,68%	
Ignacio Díaz	PO	1,899	1,07%	2,546	1,44%	
Blank votes		3,563	2,01%	5,441	3,07%	
Null votes		1,124	0,63%	703	0,39%	
Total votes		177,291 (70%)	100.00			
Source: Catamarca Judicial Power (with department breakdown)

=== March 20 ===
Chubut

On 20 March 2011, Chubut Province elected a governor and 27 provincial deputies, thus renewing the whole legislature. Chubut will also elect 3 members of the provincial Judiciary Council.

The ticket for Governor and Vice-Governor is elected by simple majority on a direct election, for a 4-year period. They can be re-elected for a single consecutive time, either in the same order or in alternating positions. The unicameral legislature, the Chamber of Deputies, is renewed every four years. The provincial deputies can be re-elected. The legislative election is direct in a single district: the most voted party gains 16 seats (60%) and the remaining 11 seats are proportionally divided among the following party lists, by D'Hondt method, without threshold.

The main candidates for Governor are the current mayor of Comodoro Rivadavia, Martín Buzzi (Modelo Chubut-Federal Peronism, PJ), supported by incumbent Governor Mario Das Neves; and Mayor of Puerto Madryn, Carlos Eliceche (Front for Victory, PJ), allied to the national government. Two-times Governor Das Neves cannot run for re-election, and it is currently a presidential pre-candidate. Provincial parties Proyección Vecinal Chubutense (ProVeCh), second in the last elections and allied to the provincial government, as well as Acción Chubutense (PACh), will run on their own lists. Other candidates are Mayor of Rada Tilly Pedro Peralta, for the Radical Civic Union (that governed the province until 2003) and provincial deputy Fernando Urbano, for the Civic Coalition ARI.

The current Chamber of Deputies is made up of 18 pro-government (14 Modelo Chubut-PJ and 4 ProVeCh) deputies, 4 UCR, 3 Kirchnerites (2 former PJ, 1 former ProVeCh), 1 PACh, 1 ARI. Chubut represents 1.22% of the national electorate.

The elections yielded inconclusive results initially, as Buzzi's total of 37.8% (against Eliceche's 37.2%), and his winning margin of 1,551 votes led to a recount when irregularities led to a judicial injunction against results in six precincts totaling 1,967 votes. Following a protracted recount process, as well a court-ordered re-vote held on May 29 in the six impugned precincts, Buzzi, albeit with a narrowed lead of 384 votes, was officially elected Governor of Chubut.

Local elections were also held in 27 Intendencies. Results in these elections created an ironic twist to the headline gubernatorial race: Comodoro Rivadavia, where Buzzi had been mayor, elected the opposition FpV candidate, Néstor di Pierro; and Puerto Madryn, where Eliceche had been mayor, elected the opposition Federal Peronist candidate, Ricardo Sastre.

=== April 10 ===
Salta

On 10 April 2011, Salta Province elected governor, 11 provincial senators, and 30 provincial deputies. Incumbent Juan Manuel Urtubey won with 59.57% of the votes.

Summary of the 10 April 2011 Salta provincial election results
Governor candidate	Party or coalition	Votes for Governor	Percent
Juan Manuel Urtubey	Front for Victory Alliance	327596	59.57%
Alfredo Olmedo	PRO	138132	25.12%
Walter Wayar	PJ	46728	8.50%
Claudio Ariel Del Pla	PO	13388	2.44%
Diego Mariño	UCR	9949	1.69%
Carlos Fernando Morello	Movimiento Proyecto Sur	9201	1.68%
Alberto Tonda	CC-ARI	4530	0.83%
Carlos Fernández	Movimiento Independiente de Jubilados y Desocupados	1195	0.22%
Positive votes		550019	
Blank votes		9171	
Nulls votes		3602	
Source: Generales Resultado (Final results with department breakdown; 100% of the votes)

=== May 29 ===
La Rioja

On May 29, La Rioja Province elected Governor and 18 provincial legislators. Incumbent Luis Beder Herrera won with 67.20% of the votes.

Summary of the 29 May 2011 La Rioja provincial election results
Governor candidate	Party or coalition	Votes for Governor	Percent
Luis Beder Herrera	Front for Victory Alliance	109605	67.11%
Julio Martínez	Frente Cívico para el Cambio	32069	19.64%
Ángel Maza	Frente Unión Riojana	17795	10.90%
Carlos Santander	Partido Es Posible	1858	1.16%
Marcelo Lucero	Nuevo Encuentro-Socialist Party	1419	0.87%
Pedro Gauna	Frente Grande-Encuentro por el Proyecto Nacional y Popular	538	0.33%
Blank votes		8838	
Nulls votes		1707	
Source: eleccion2011larioja.com.ar (Final results with department breakdown; 99.48% of votes)

=== June 12 ===
Neuquén

On 12 June 2011, Neuquén Province elected a Governor and 35 provincial legislators. This included the first electoral success for the new Workers Left Front, with a legislator elected.

=== June 26 ===
Misiones

On 26 June 2011, Misiones Province elected its governor and 20 provincial legislators.

Tierra del Fuego

On 26 June 2011, Tierra del Fuego Province elected its governor and 15 provincial legislators. On 3 July, Fabiana Ríos of the Patagonian Social Party (provincial section of CC-ARI) won the runoff with 50.66% against Rosana Bertone (FpV-PJ)

=== July 10 ===
Buenos Aires

On 10 July 2011, the Autonomous City of Buenos Aires held the first round of its local elections. The runoff was held on 31 July.

Summary of the 10 and 31 July 2011 Buenos Aires Chief of Government election results
Candidate	Party or coalition	First round		Second round	
Candidate	Party or coalition	Votes	Percent	Votes	Percent
Mauricio Macri	PRO	830,016	47.08	1,086,971	64.25
Daniel Filmus	FpV-PJ	489,760	27.78	604,822	35.75
Fernando Solanas	Proyecto Sur	225,917	12.82		
María Eugenia Estenssoro	CC-ARI	58,483	3.32		
Silvana Myriam Giudici	UCR	36,372	2.06		
Jorge Telerman	Frente Progresista	31,002	1.76		
Luis Zamora	AyL	25,886	1.47		
Ricardo López Murphy	Partido Autonomista	24,834	1.41		
Other candidates		40,563	2.30		
Blank votes		22,543	1.25	42,568	2.38
Nulls votes		14,771	0.82	49,586	2.77
Challenged and appealed votes		2,142	0.12	4,088	0.23
Voter turnout		1,802,289	73.03	1,691,793	72.16
Source: C.A.B.A.

The incumbent Macri's running mate is María Eugenia Vidal. Carlos Tomada is the running mate of Filmus.

=== July 24 ===
Santa Fe

On 24 July 2011, Santa Fe Province elected governor, 50 provincial deputies and 19 provincial senators.

=== August 7 ===
Córdoba

On 7 August 2011, Córdoba Province elected Governor and 70 provincial legislators.

=== August 28 ===
Tucumán

On 28 August 2011, Tucumán Province elected governor and 49 provincial legislators.

=== September 18 ===
Chaco

On 18 September 2011, Chaco Province elected governor and 16 provincial legislators.

=== October 23 ===
On 23 October 2011, the date of the Argentine general elections, 14 Provinces held elections:

Buenos Aires Province

Buenos Aires Province elected governor, 26 provincial deputies and 23 provincial senators.

Corrientes

Corrientes Province elected 13 provincial deputies and 4 provincial senators.

Entre Ríos

Entre Ríos Province elected Governor, 28 provincial deputies and 18 provincial senators.

Formosa

Formosa Province elected Governor and 15 provincial legislators

Jujuy

Jujuy Province elected Governor and 24 provincial legislators.

La Pampa

La Pampa Province elected Governor and 26 provincial legislators.

Mendoza

Mendoza Province elected governor, 24 provincial deputies and 19 provincial senators.

Río Negro

Río Negro Province elected Governor and 43 provincial legislators.

San Juan

San Juan Province elected Governor and 34 provincial legislators.

San Luis

San Luis Province elected governor, 21 provincial deputies and 5 provincial senators

Santa Cruz

Santa Cruz Province elected Governor and 24 provincial legislators.

== See also ==
- Elections in Argentina
- 2011 Argentine general election
