= 2011 Assembly election =

Two assembly elections took place in 2011:

- 2011 Northern Ireland Assembly election
- 2011 National Assembly for Wales election

== See also ==
- List of elections in 2011
