= 2011 Madeiran regional election =

← 2007	9 October 2011	2015 →

47 seats to the Legislative Assembly of Madeira 24 seats needed for a majority
- Turnout: 57.4% ▼3.4 pp
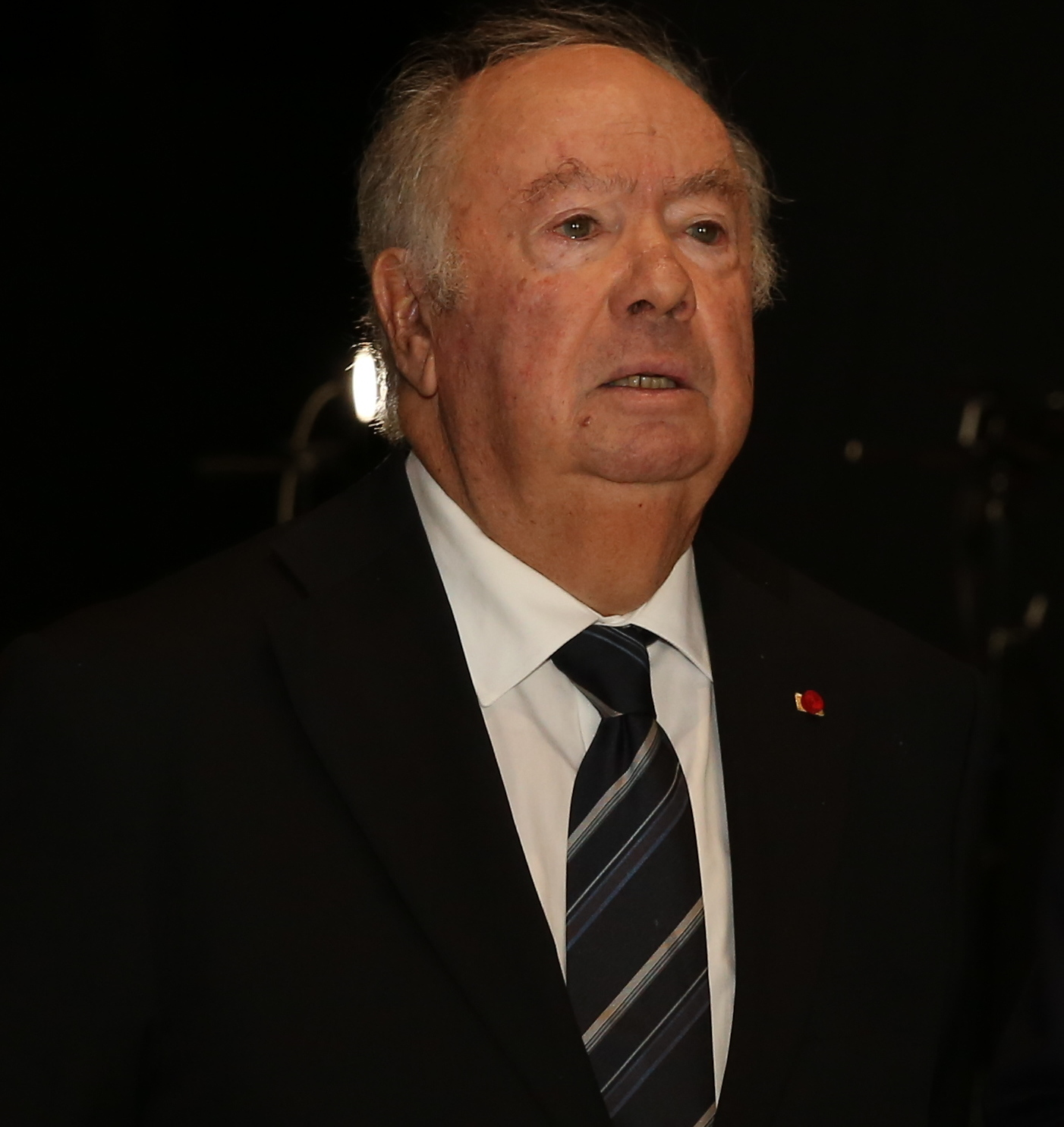

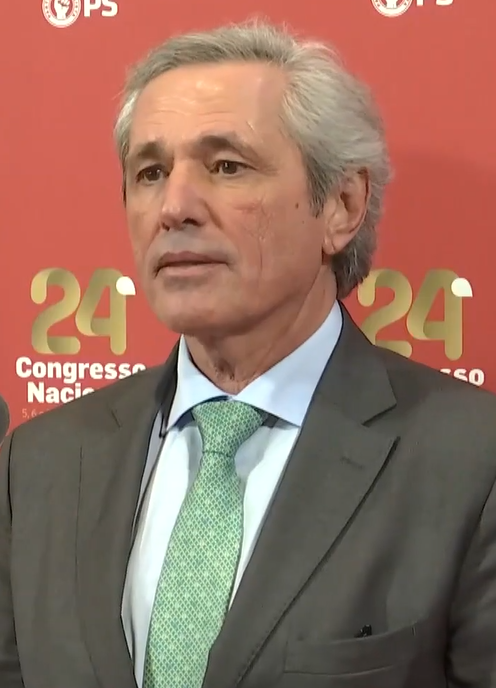

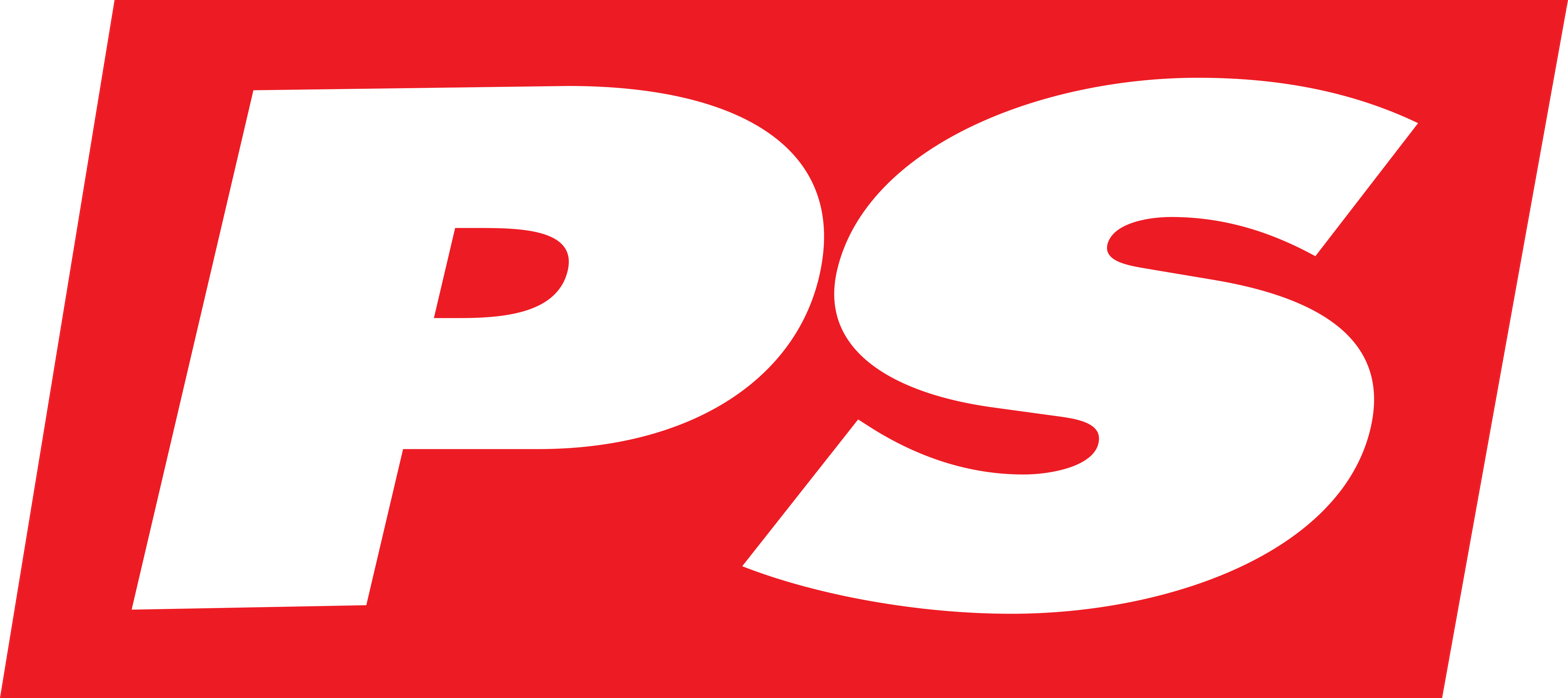

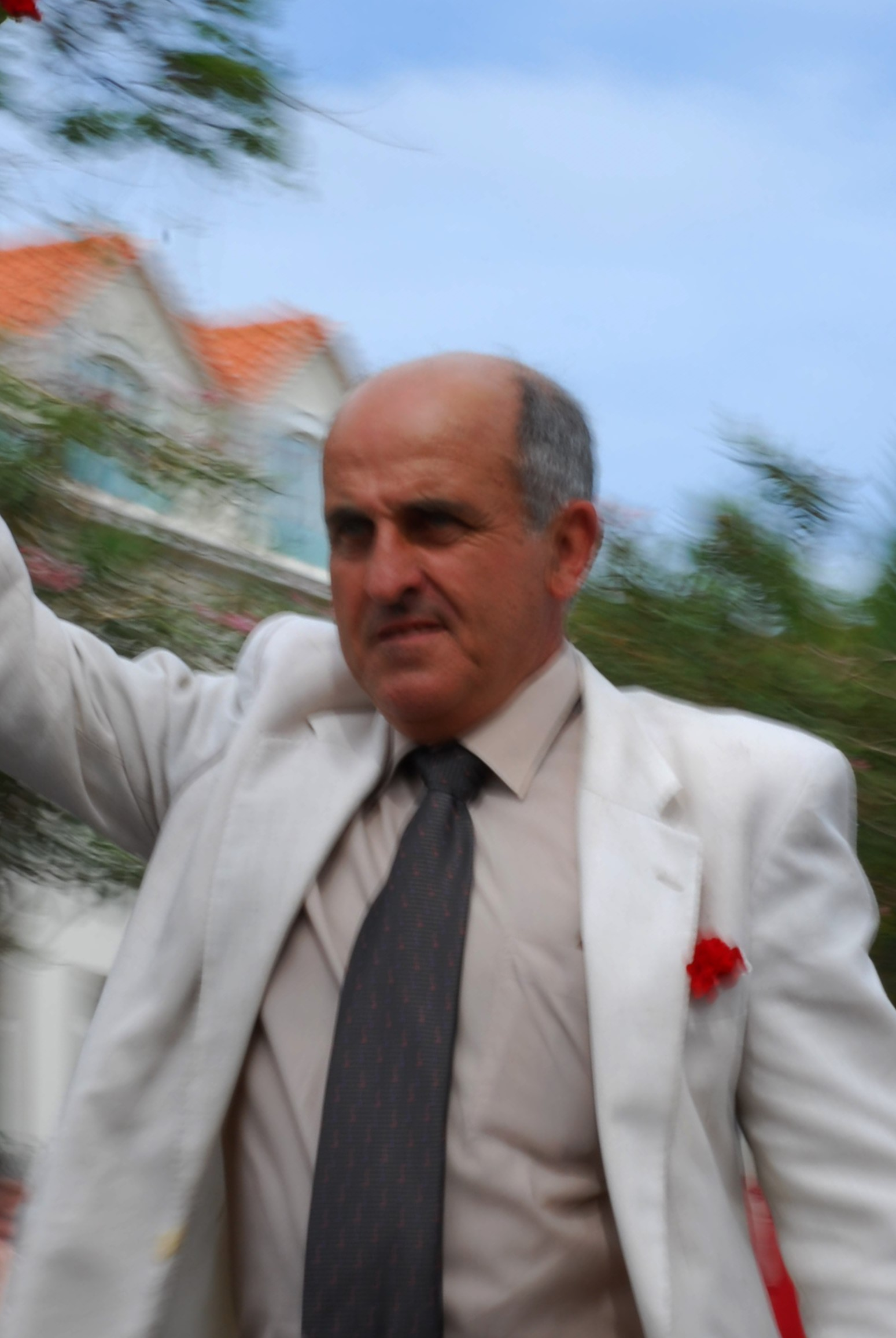

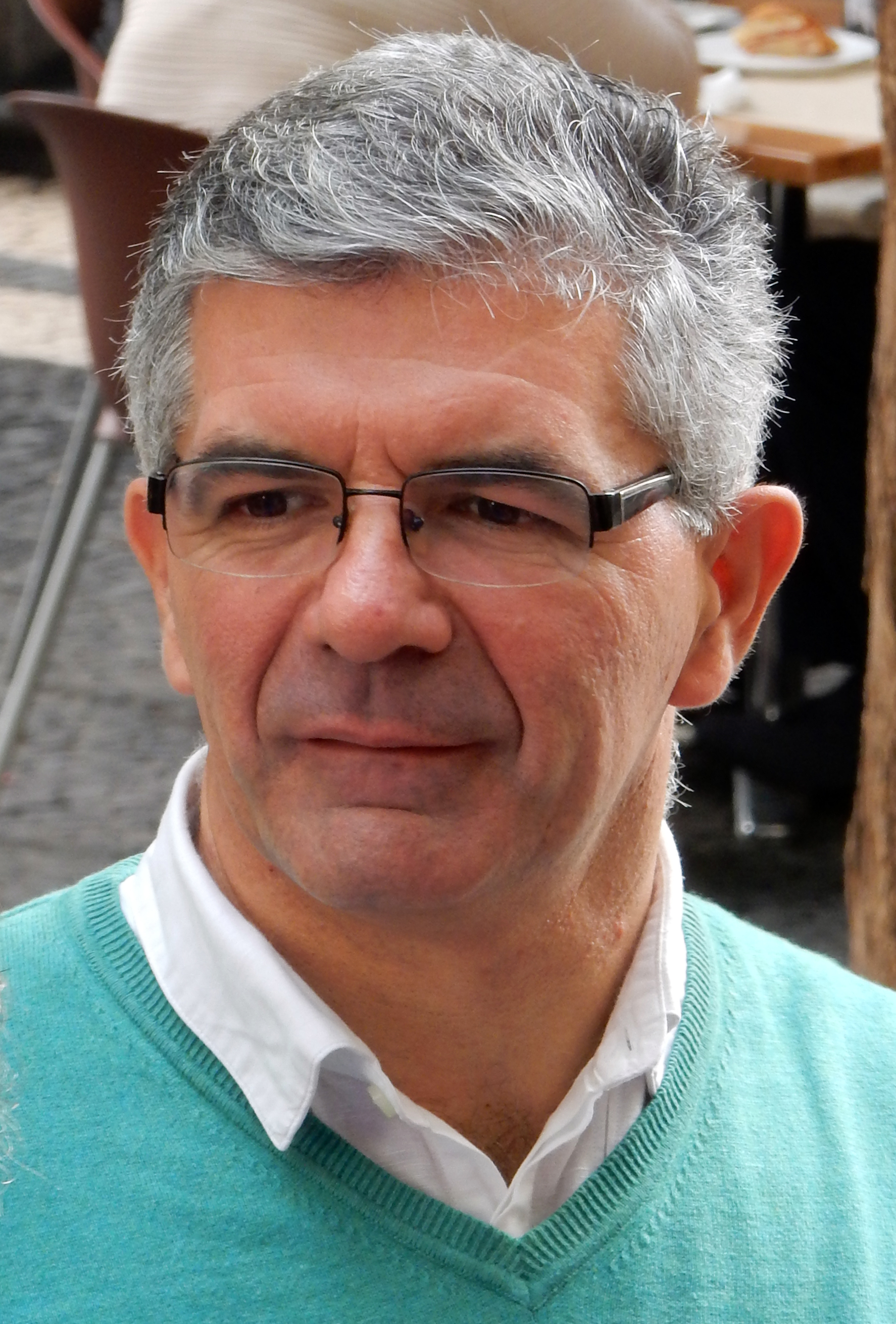

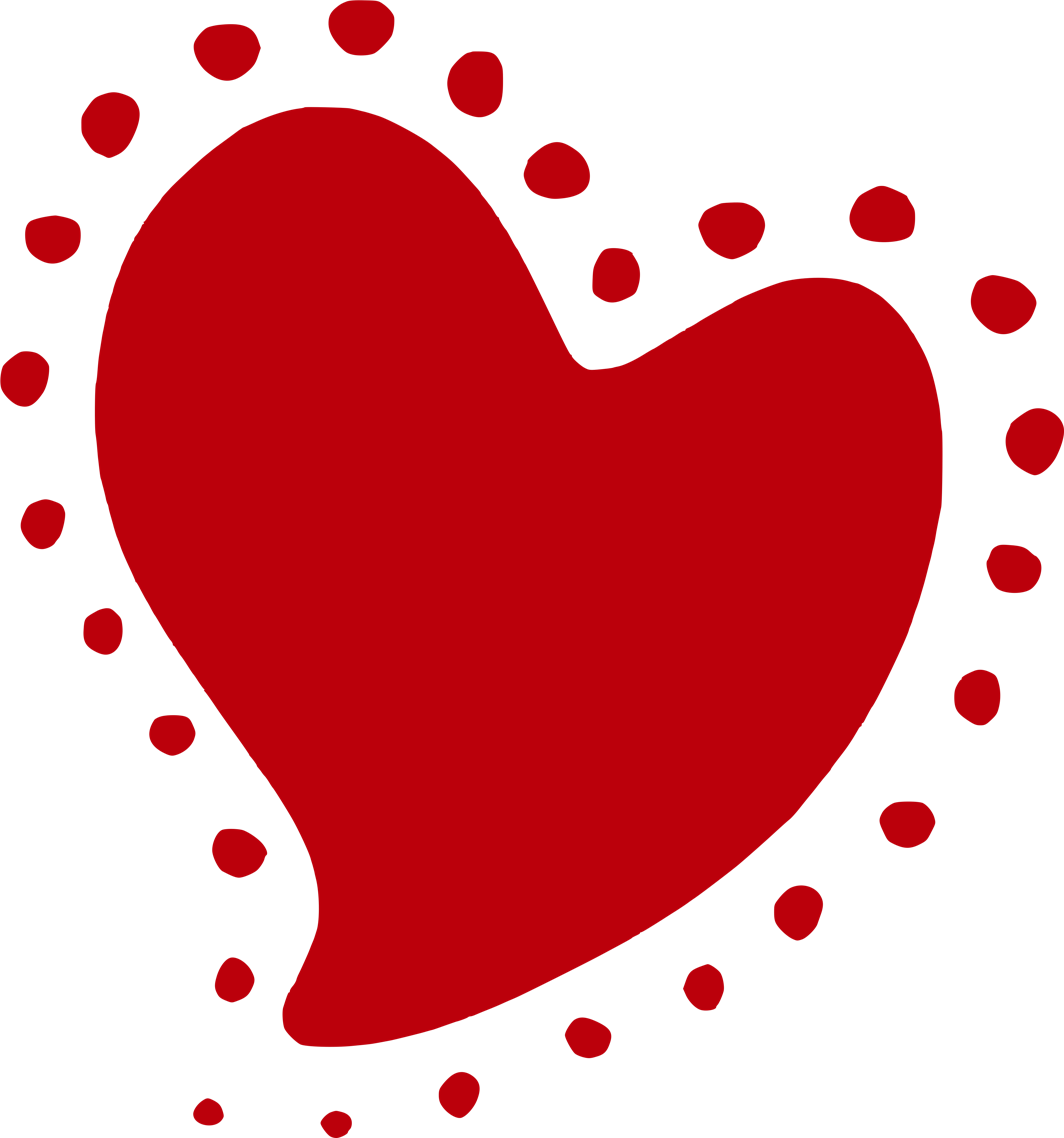

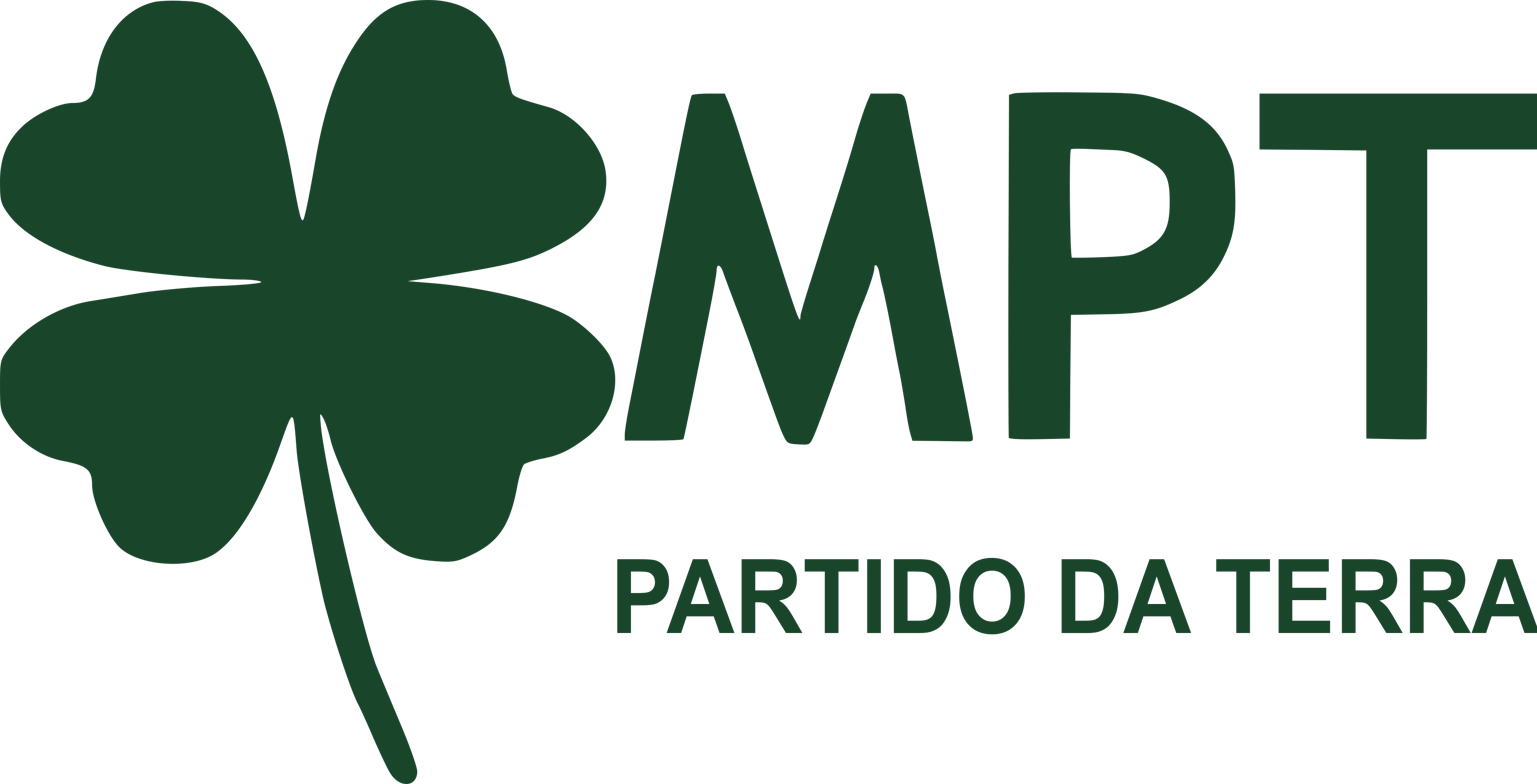

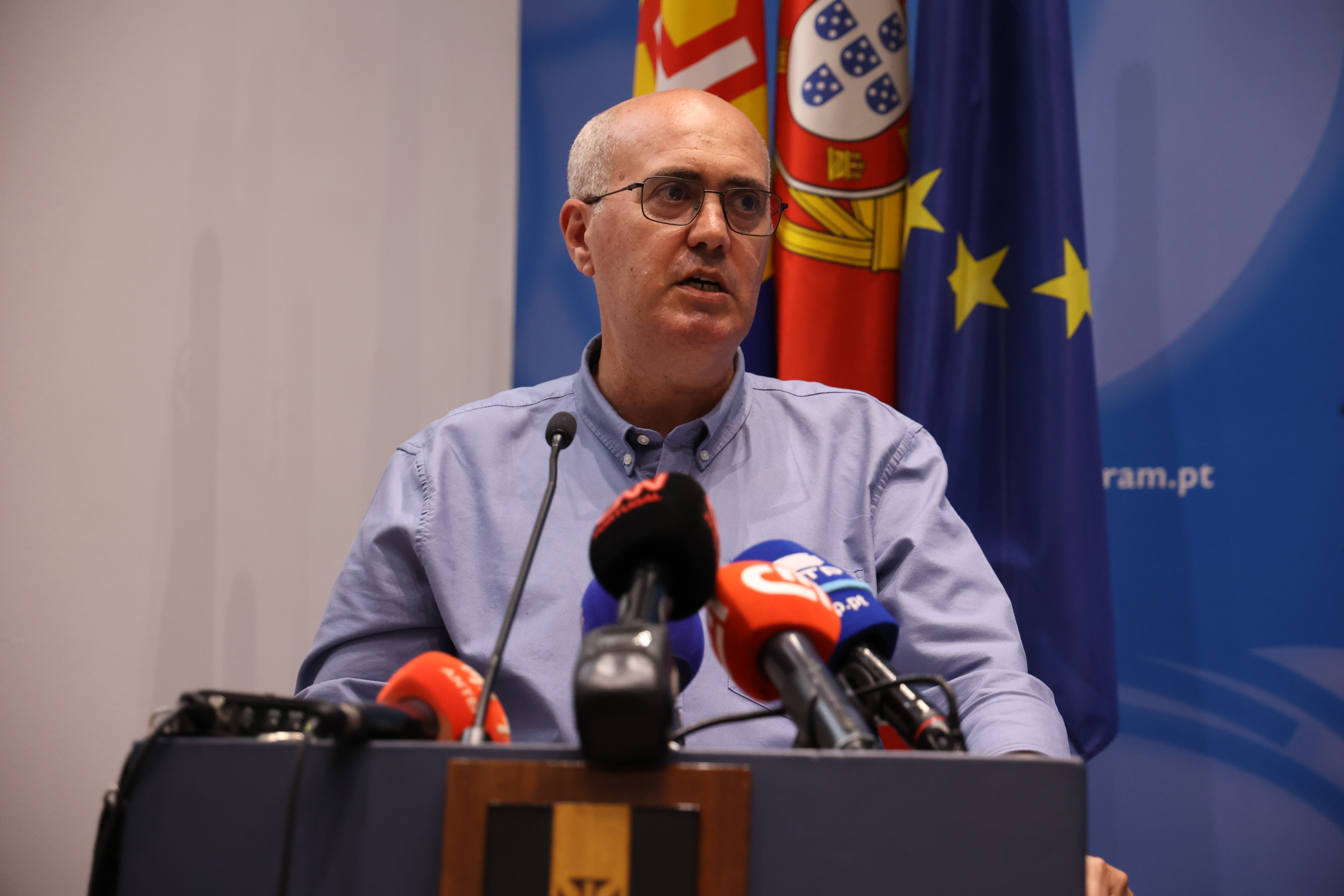
	First party	Second party	Third party
Leader	Alberto João Jardim	José Manuel Rodrigues	Maximiano Martins
Party	PSD	CDS–PP	PS
Last election	33 seats, 64.2%	2 seats, 5.3%	7 seats, 15.4%
Seats won	25	9	6
Seat change	▼8	▲7	▼1
Popular vote	71,561	25,975	16,942
Percentage	48.6%	17.6%	11.5%
Swing	▼15.7 pp	▲12.3 pp	▼3.9 pp
	Fourth party	Fifth party	Sixth party
Leader	José Manuel Coelho	Edgar Silva	Hélder Spínola de Freitas
Party	PTP	CDU	PND
Last election	Did not contest	2 seats, 5.4%	1 seat, 2.1%
Seats won	3	1	1
Seat change	▲3	▼1	0
Popular vote	10,115	5,546	4,825
Percentage	6.9%	3.8%	3.3%
Swing	New party	▼1.6 pp	▲1.2 pp
	Seventh party	Eighth party	Ninth party
Leader	Rui Almeida	João Gonçalves	Roberto Almada
Party	PAN	MPT	BE
Last election	Did not contest	1 seat, 2.3%	1 seat, 3.0%
Seats won	1	1	0
Seat change	▲1	0	▼1
Popular vote	3,134	2,839	2,512
Percentage	2.1%	1.9%	1.7%
Swing	New party	▼0.3 pp	▼1.3 pp
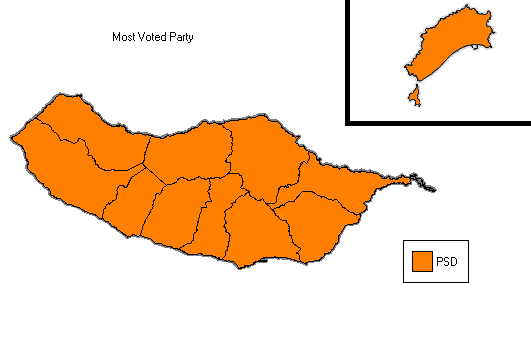
- The most voted party in each municipality.
President before election
Alberto João Jardim
PSD
Elected President
Alberto João Jardim
PSD

A regional election was held in Madeira on 9 October 2011, to determine the composition of the Legislative Assembly of the Autonomous Region of Madeira. In the election, the Social Democratic Party, led by Alberto João Jardim, who has been in power since 1978, archived, once again, an absolute majority.

The campaign for the regional legislative election in Madeira ran from 25 September to 7 October 2011.

The election was marked by the discovery of a "financial hole" in the accounts of the Regional Government, which may have influenced the election results. In fact, the PSD obtained its worst result ever in a regional election (48.56 percent), resulting in the loss of eight deputies in relation to the regional elections of 2007. The CDS–PP grew from 5 percent to 17.6 percent and from 4th most voted party to second most voted party, a result that was considered historical by national party leader Paulo Portas.

The CDS–PP and PS-Madeira claimed that there were irregularities in the election, specifically because of the transportation of voters to the polls with vehicles of various public bodies which led to the formalization of a complaint to the National Elections Commission (CNE).

== Electoral system ==
The 47 members of the Madeiran regional parliament are elected in a single constituency by proportional representation under the D'Hondt method, coinciding with the territory of the Region.

== Parties ==
The parties that partook in the election, and their leaders, were:

- Left Bloc (BE), Roberto Almada
- Unitary Democratic Coalition (CDU), Edgar Silva
- Earth Party (MPT), João Gonçalves
- Party for Animals and Nature (PAN), Rui Almeida
- New Democracy Party (PND), Hélder Spínola de Freitas
- Socialist Party (PS), Maximiano Martins
- Social Democratic Party (PPD/PSD), Alberto João Jardim
- People's Party (CDS–PP), José Manuel Rodrigues
- Portuguese Labour Party (PTP), José Manuel Coelho

== Opinion polling ==
Polling firm/Link	Fieldwork date	PSD	PS	CDU	CDS–PP	BE	MPT	PND	PTP	PAN	O	Lead
2011 regional election	9 Oct 2011	48.6; 25	11.5; 6	3.8; 1	17.6; 9	1.7; 0	1.9; 1	3.3; 1	6.9; 3	2.1; 1	2.6; 0	31.0
Eurosondagem	2–4 Oct 2011	50.5	17.0	5.5	10.5	3.5	3.3	2.0	2.7	2.5	2.5	33.5
UCP–CESOP	1–2 Oct 2011	48	14	5	16	2	2	4	5	2	2	32
Intercampus	30 Sep–3 Oct 2011	53.5	16.9	3.9	11.8	2.5	—	2.8	—	—	8.6	36.6
Eurosondagem	25–27 Jul 2011	56.6	15.9	3.9	10.2	2.8	2.1	2.1	2.3	2.3	1.8	40.7
Eurosondagem	30–31 May 2011	50.5	17.2	4.5	15.0	3.8	—	—	—	—	9.0	33.3
2007 regional election	6 May 2007	64.2; 33	15.4; 7	5.4; 2	5.3; 2	3.0; 1	2.3; 1	2.1; 1	—	—	2.3; 0	48.8

== Voter turnout ==
The table below shows voter turnout throughout election day.

Turnout	Time								
Turnout	12:00			16:00			19:00		
Turnout	2007	2011	±	2007	2011	±	2007	2011	±
Total	24.02%	23.47%	▼0.55 pp	44.65%	43.46%	▼1.19 pp	60.75%	57.38%	▼3.37 pp

== Summary of votes and seats ==
Summary of the 9 October 2011 Legislative Assembly of Madeira elections results
Parties	Votes	%	±pp swing	MPs				
Parties	Votes	%	±pp swing	2007	2011	±	%	±
Social Democratic	71,561	48.57	▼15.7	33	25	▼8	53.19	▼17.0
People's	25,975	17.63	▲12.3	2	9	▲7	19.15	▲14.8
Socialist	16,942	11.50	▼3.9	7	6	▼1	12.77	▼2.1
Labour	10,115	6.87	—	—	3	—	6.38	—
Unitary Democratic Coalition	5,546	3.76	▼3.8	2	1	▼1	2.13	▼2.1
New Democracy	4,825	3.27	▲1.2	1	1	0	2.13	0.0
Party for Animals and Nature	3,134	2.13	—	—	1	—	2.13	—
Earth	2,839	1.93	▼0.3	1	1	0	2.13	0.0
Left Bloc	2,512	1.70	▼1.3	1	0	▼1	0.00	▼2.1
Total valid	143,449	97.36	▼0.4	47	47	0	100.00	0.0
Blank ballots	1,088	0.74	▼0.1					
Invalid ballots	2,800	1.90	▲0.5					
Total	147,337	100.00						
Registered voters/turnout	256,755	57.38	▼3.4					
Source: Comissão Nacional de Eleições

Vote share
PSD	48.57%
CDS-PP	17.63%
PS	11.50%
PTP	6.87%
CDU	3.76%
PND	3.27%
PAN	2.13%
MPT	1.93%
BE	1.70%
Blank/Invalid	2.64%

Parliamentary seats
PSD	53.19%
CDS-PP	19.15%
PS	12.77%
PTP	6.38%
CDU	2.13%
PND	2.13%
PAN	2.13%
MPT	2.13%

=== Maps ===
Most voted political force by municipality.

== See also ==
- Madeira
