= Elections in Argentina =

At the national level, Argentina elects a head of state (the President) and a legislature. The franchise extends to all citizens aged 16 and over, and voting is mandatory (with a few exceptions) for all those who are between 18 and 70 years of age.

The President and the Vice President are elected in one ballot, for a four-year term, by direct popular vote, using a runoff voting system: a second vote is held if no party wins more than 45% of the votes, or more than 40% with also at least 10 percentage points more than the runner-up. Before the 1995 election, the president and vice-president were both elected by an electoral college.

The National Congress (Congreso de la Nación) has two chambers. The Chamber of Deputies of the Nation (Cámara de Diputados de la Nación) has 257 members, elected for a four-year term in each electoral district (23 Provinces and the Autonomous City of Buenos Aires) by proportional representation using the D'Hondt method, with half of the seats renewed every two years in all districts. The Senate of the Nation (Senado de la Nación) has 72 members, elected for a six-year term in three-seat constituencies (23 provinces and the Autonomous City of Buenos Aires) for a six-year term, with two seats awarded to the largest party or coalition and one seat to the second largest party or coalition. One-third of the constituencies are renewed every two years. In 2001 the whole senate was renewed. A gender parity law, adopted in 2017, mandates that party lists must alternate between male and female candidates.

== History ==
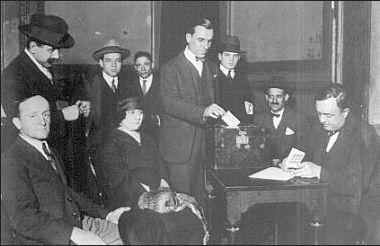
Voters casting their ballots in the 1924 legislative election.

Universal, secret and compulsory voting for male Argentine citizens, either natural-born or naturalized, was guaranteed by the 1912 Sáenz Peña Law, named after President Roque Sáenz Peña. The first free elections under the Sáenz Peña regime were held in 1916. Women did not have the right to vote in Argentina until 1947, when Law 13.010 ("on political rights for women") was sanctioned during the government of Juan Domingo Perón. Women first voted in a national election in 1951.

Throughout the 20th century, voting was suppressed by Argentina's numerous dictatorial regimes. The dictatorships of José Félix Uriburu (1930–1932) and the so-called Revolución Libertadora and Revolución Argentina, as well as the last military dictatorship (1976–1983), all suppressed voting altogether. In addition, electoral fraud was widespread under the successive governments of the so-called Infamous Decade. Since the return of democracy in 1983, Argentine elections have been generally deemed as free, fair and transparent, and participation levels remain high, with an average of 70.24% as of 2019.

In 2012, Law 26.774 ("on Argentine Citizenship") lowered the legal voting age for Argentine citizens from 18 to 16, making Argentina one of twelve countries in the world to do so.

== Eligibility to vote ==
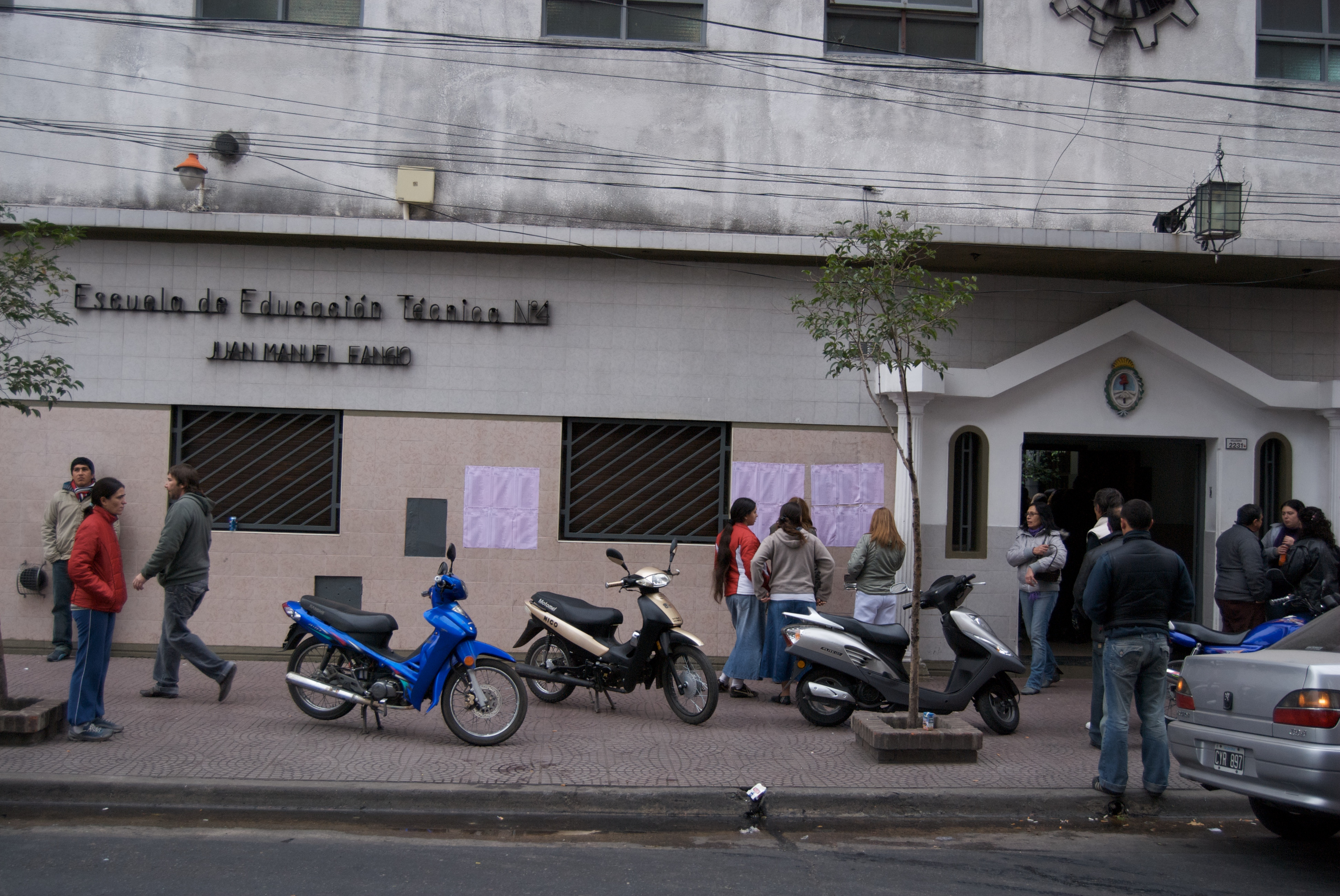
Voters queue outside a public school in Buenos Aires during the 2009 legislative election.

The right to vote is mandated in Article 37 of the Constitution of Argentina, and further detailed in the National Electoral Code. In the national order, entitlement to vote is based on citizenship. Natural-born Argentine citizens and citizens by descent aged 16 or older have the right to vote, while naturalized citizens may vote from the age of 18 (see Argentine nationality law). Non-citizen permanent residents do not have the right to vote for national offices, but may be allowed to vote for local office as established by provincial law. The right to vote is not extended to:

- the mentally unfit (as demonstrated in trial),
- those who have been convicted of crimes with intent,
- those who have been convicted of illegal gambling (for three years only, and for six years in cases of recidivism),
- those who have been sanctioned for qualified desertion,
- those who have been declared to be rebels in a criminal cause, until the cessation of said rebellion, or until prescription,
- those who are limited by the dispositions on the Organic Law on Political Parties,
- those who have otherwise been declared unable to exercise their political rights.

All Argentine citizens are automatically registered to vote in the national electoral roll, which is updated on a bi-yearly basis ahead of every scheduled election. From the ages of 18 to 70, voting is compulsory. Eligible voters between the ages of 18 and 70 may by exempt from voting if they are:

- sitting judges and their auxiliaries who must remain in their offices for the duration of the electoral act,
- over 500 kilometers away from their designated voting place, and can justify that distance with reason through a certificate written by their closest police authority,
- ill or otherwise unable, with sufficient proof, as demonstrated by a doctor in the national, provincial, or municipal health services, or by private doctors if all the aforementioned are not available.

Argentine citizens living abroad may vote in embassies and consulates of Argentina.

== Provincial elections ==
Provincial law and constitutions, controlled by provincial legislatures regulate elections at the provincial level and local level. Since the separation of powers applies to provinces as well as the federal government, provincial legislatures and the executive (the governor) are elected separately. Governors are elected in all provinces.

All members of provincial legislatures and territorial jurisdiction legislature are elected.

As a matter of convenience and cost-saving, elections for many of these provincial and local offices are held at the same time as the federal presidential elections. There is a handful of provinces, however, that instead hold their elections separately.

== Schedule ==
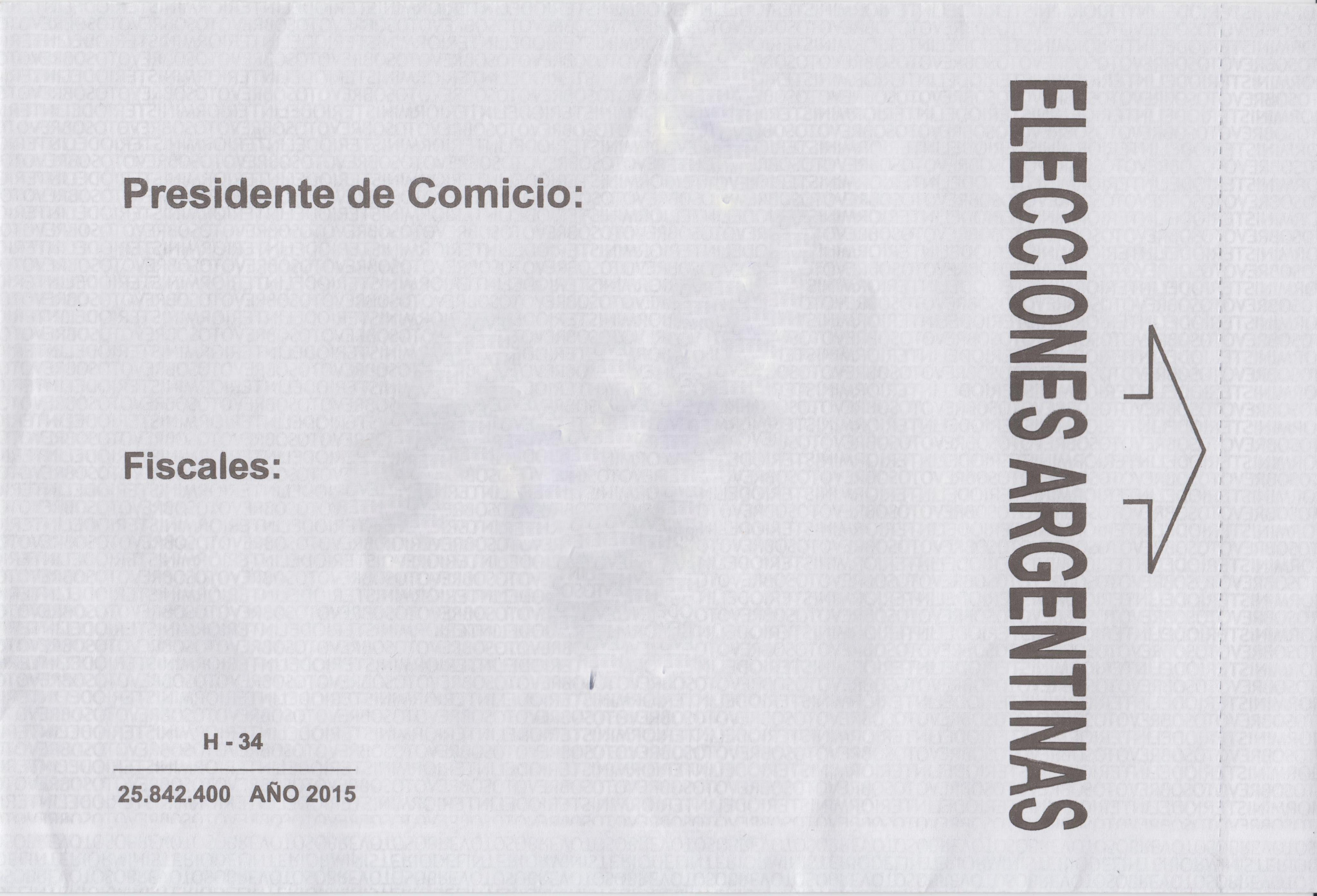
Envelope to cast votes in during the general elections of 2015.

=== Election ===
Position	2019	2020	2021	2022	2023
Type	Open Primaries (Note: Simultaneous open primaries for all national candidatures, mandatory for every political party) (August); Presidential (October); National Senate (October); Chamber of Deputies (October); Provincial (March–October); Municipalities (March–October)	Municipalities (no data)	Open Primaries (August); National Senate (October); Chamber of Deputies (October); Provincial (TBA); Municipalities (TBA)	Municipalities (no data)	Open Primaries (August); Presidential (October); National Senate (October); Chamber of Deputies (October); Provincial (March–October); Municipalities (March–October)
President and Vice-president	President and Vice-president	None			President and Vice-president
National Senate	Third (Note: The following eight provinces renew all its three senators: Buenos Aires Province, Formosa, Jujuy, La Rioja, Misiones, San Juan, San Luis, Santa Cruz)	None	Third (Note: The following eight provinces renew all its three senators:Autonomous City of Buenos Aires, Chaco, Entre Ríos, Neuquén, Río Negro, Salta, Santiago del Estero and Tierra del Fuego)	None	Third (Note: The following eight provinces renew all its three senators: Catamarca, Chubut, Córdoba, Corrientes, La Pampa, Mendoza, Santa Fe and Tucumán)
Chamber of Deputies	Half (Note: All 23 provinces and the Autonomous City of Buenos Aires renew half its deputies)	None	Half	None	Half
Provincial (Governors and Legislatures)	22 Provinces (G) (Note: All Provinces and the Autonomous City of Buenos Aires except for Corrientes and Santiago del Estero); 23 Provinces (L) (Note: All Provinces and the Autonomous City of Buenos Aires except for Santiago del Estero)	None	2 Provinces (G) (Note: Corrientes and Santiago del Estero); 13 Provinces (L) (Note: Autonomous City of Buenos Aires, Buenos Aires Province, Catamarca, Chaco, Corrientes, Formosa, Jujuy, La Rioja, Mendoza, Misiones, Salta, San Luis and Santiago del Estero)	None	22 Provinces (G) (Note: All Provinces and the Autonomous City of Buenos Aires except for Corrientes and Santiago del Estero); 23 Provinces (L) (Note: All Provinces and the Autonomous City of Buenos Aires except for Santiago del Estero)
Municipalities (Mayors and Councils)	no data	no data	no data	no data	no data

=== Inauguration ===
Position	2019	2020	2021	2022	2023
Type	Presidential (December); National Senate; Chamber of Deputies; Provincial; Municipalities	Municipalities	National Senate; Chamber of Deputies; Provincial; Municipalities	Municipalities	Presidential; National Senate; Chamber of Deputies; Provincial; Municipalities
President and Vice-president	10 December	None			10 December
National Senate	10 December	None	10 December	None	10 December
Chamber of Deputies	10 December	None	10 December	None	10 December
Provinces (Governors and Legislatures)	December	None	December	None	December
Municipalities (Mayors and Councils)	no data	no data	no data	no data	no data

== Latest elections ==
The ruling "Union for the Homeland" coalition lost to the "La Libertad Avanza" alliance in the second round presidential elections by 55.69% vs 44.31%.

== See also ==
- Political parties in Argentina
- Electoral calendar
- Electoral system
