= David Onek =

American politician

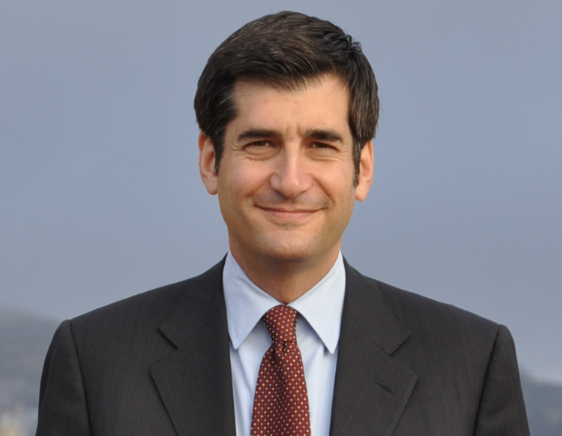
David Onek

David Onek was the former executive director of the Northern California Innocence Project at Santa Clara University School of Law. He formerly served as Senior Fellow and founding Executive Director at the Berkeley Center for Criminal Justice. He is also the host of the Criminal Justice Conversations Podcast. In 2011, Onek ran unsuccessfully for District Attorney of San Francisco.

== Career ==
After Onek attended Brown University and Stanford Law School, he received a Skadden Fellowship to work as a staff attorney at Legal Services for Children in San Francisco. Onek also served as a Senior Program Associate at the W. Haywood Burns Institute for Juvenile Justice Fairness and Equity in San Francisco.

Onek served in San Francisco Mayor Gavin Newsom's Office of Criminal Justice. In that capacity, he helped spearhead the effort to commission a study of gun violence in San Francisco that led directly to San Francisco's "zone strategy".

Onek served on the San Francisco Police Commission, where he advocated for modern upgrades such as CompStat.

Onek is the author of "Serious Gun Violence in San Francisco: Developing a Partnership-Based Violence Prevention Strategy" (with Anthony Braga and Tracey Meares) in Community Policing and Peacekeeping (2009); "Reducing Disproportionate Minority Confinement in Seattle: The W. Haywood Burns Institute Approach" (with James Bell and Michael Finley) in No Turning Back: Promising Approaches to Reducing Racial and Ethnic Disparities Affecting Youth of Color in the Justice System (2005); and "What Works with Juvenile Offenders? A Review of 'Graduated Sanction' Programs" (with Barry Krisberg and Elliott Currie) in Community Corrections: Probation, Parole and Intermediate Sanctions (1998).

== Campaign for San Francisco District Attorney ==
Onek ran unsuccessfully for District Attorney of San Francisco in the November 2011 election. His campaign was endorsed by the San Francisco Democratic Party, the California Police Chiefs Association, United Educators of San Francisco, Service Employees International Union (SEIU) Local 1021, Assemblymember Tom Ammiano, Supervisors John Avalos, Carmen Chu and Eric Mar, and former Mayor Art Agnos.

Onek made his opposition to the death penalty a key component of his campaign for District Attorney. He has also been adamant about his desire to reform California's application of three strikes laws. Onek is also a strong proponent of juvenile justice reform and incorporating the process of restorative justice.

== Personal ==
Onek was raised in Washington, D.C. His father worked in the Carter administration. Onek is married to Kara Dukakis, daughter of Michael Dukakis.
