= 2011 Montgomery mayoral election =

- August 23, 2011
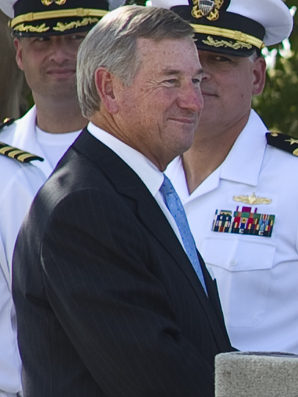

Candidate	Todd Strange	Hobson Cox
Party	nonpartisan candidate	nonpartisan candidate
Popular vote	19,126	4,424
Percentage	81.21%	18.79%
Mayor before election
Todd Strange
Republican
Elected mayor
Todd Strange
Republican

The 2011 Montgomery mayoral election took place on August 23, 2011, to elect the Mayor of Montgomery, Alabama. It saw the reelection of incumbent mayor Todd Strange.

The election was officially nonpartisan. Had no candidate received a majority of the vote, a runoff election would have been held between the top two candidates.

== Results ==
Results
Party	Candidate	Votes	%
Nonpartisan	Todd Strange	19,126	81.21
Nonpartisan	Hobson Cox	4,424	18.79
Total votes		23,550	
