= 2011 Miami-Dade County mayoral election =

2011 Miami-Dade County mayoral special election may refer to:

- 2011 Miami-Dade County mayoral recall election
- 2011 Miami-Dade County mayoral special election
