= 2011 Louisiana lieutenant gubernatorial election =

- October 22, 2011
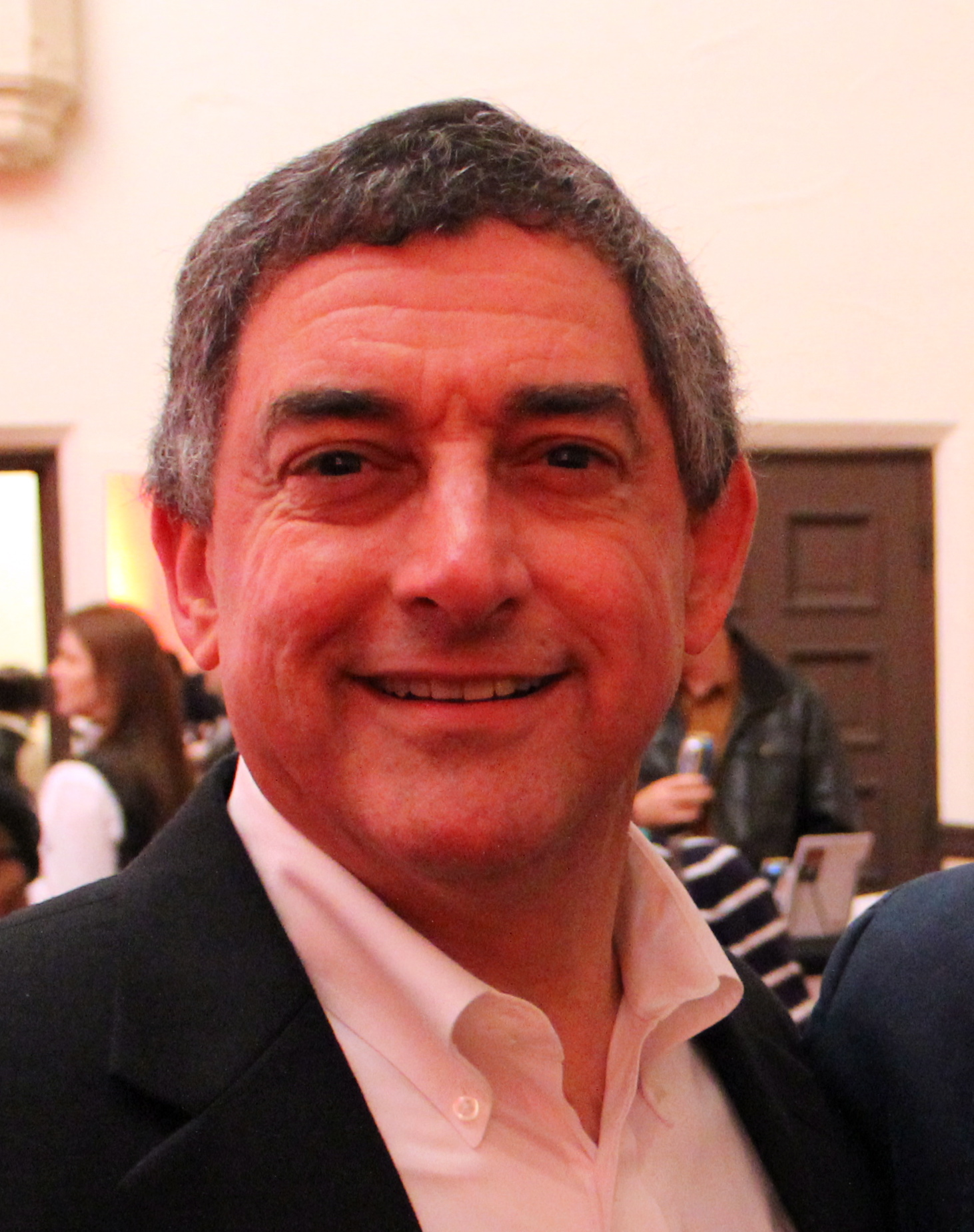

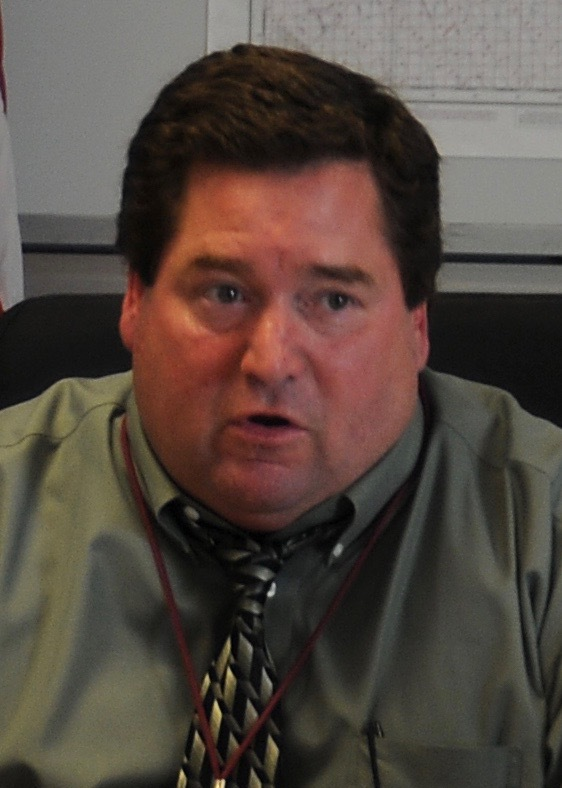
Nominee	Jay Dardenne	Billy Nungesser
Party	Republican	Republican
Popular vote	504,228	444,750
Percentage	53.13%	46.87%
- Parish results Dardenne: 50–60% 60–70% Nungesser: 50–60% 60–70% 70–80%
Lieutenant Governor before election
Jay Dardenne
Republican
Elected Lieutenant Governor
Jay Dardenne
Republican

The 2011 Louisiana lieutenant gubernatorial election was held on October 22, 2011, to elect the Lieutenant Governor of Louisiana. Incumbent Republican Lieutenant Governor Jay Dardenne who was elected in a 2010 special election won his bid for a full term. Dardenne was challenged by fellow Republican Billy Nungesser, President of Plaquemines Parish.

Louisiana is the only state that has a jungle primary system where all candidates appear on the same ballot, regardless of party, and voters may vote for any candidate, regardless of their party affiliation. If no candidate had received an absolute majority of the vote during the primary election on October 22, 2011, a runoff election would have been held on November 19, 2011, between the top two candidates in the primary. (California and Washington have a similar "top two primary" system).

== Candidates ==
=== Republican Party ===
- Billy Nungesser, President of Plaquemines Parish
- Jay Dardenne, incumbent Lieutenant Governor

== Jungle Primary ==
=== Polling ===
Poll source	Date(s) administered	Sample size	Margin of error	Billy Nungesser (R)	Jay Dardenne (R)	Undecided
Clarus Research Group	October 5–7, 2011	602	± 4%	27%	40%	33%

== Results ==
Despite polling projecting incumbent Lieutenant Governor Dardenne to win by a wide margin, he went on to win by only 6 points. Dardenne did well in the North while Nungesser did better in the South, notably carrying Orleans parish, home of New Orleans. Dardenne became the first Republican lieutenant governor to be elected to a full term since Paul Hardy in 1987.

2011 Louisiana Lieutenant Governor election
Party	Candidate	Votes	%	±%
Republican	Jay Dardenne (incumbent)	504,228	53.13	
Republican	Billy Nungesser Jr.	444,750	46.87	
Turnout		948,978		
Republican hold				

== See also ==
- Lieutenant Governor of Louisiana
- 2011 Louisiana elections
