= 1924 Argentine legislative election =

- 2 March 1924
- 81 of the 158 seats in the Chamber of Deputies
- Turnout: 47.24%
Party	Vote %	Seats	+/–
Radical Civic Union	27.21	26	−25
Conservative Parties	21.97	22	+13
Socialist Party	15.29	16	+9
Unified Radical Civic Union	11.28	9	+7
Antipersonalist Radical Civic Union	6.97	3	New
Democratic Progressive Party	5.71	3	−7
Lencinist Radical Civic Union	2.33	2	New
This lists parties that won seats. See the complete results below.
Results by province

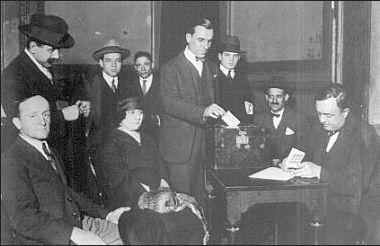
Voters vote in the 1924 elections. A lack of defining isuues, and the prevailing acrimony between pro and anti-Yrigoyen UCR factions drove turnout to the lowest in post-reform Argentine electoral history

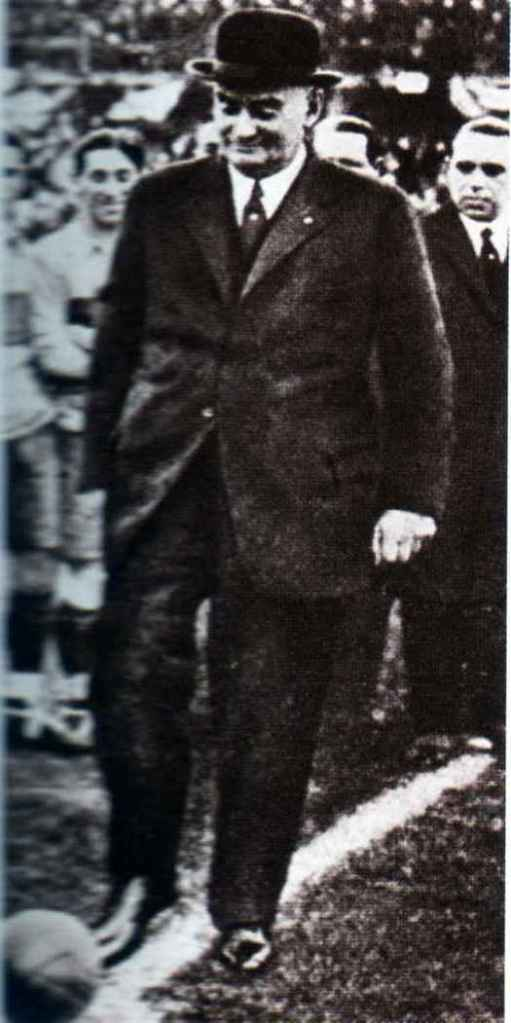
President Alvear kicks off the inaugural match at Boca Juniors stadium. 1924 effectively made him the referee in disputes among the numerous UCR factions.

Legislative elections were held in Argentina on 2 March 1924. Voters chose their legislators and numerous governors, and with a turnout of 44%.

== Background ==
President Hipólito Yrigoyen finished his term of office in 1922 with a prosperous economy, soaring popularity and content with leaving the Casa Rosada with his Ambassador to France, Marcelo Torcuato de Alvear. The scion of one of Argentina's traditional landed families, the well-mannered Alvear placated Yrigoyen's fears of losing control over the Radical Civic Union, a risk he insured himself against by placing his personal friend and former Buenos Aires Police Chief, Elpidio González, as Alvear's vice-president.

Alvear continued his predecessor's social and economic policies, including much-needed labor and pension laws, anti-trust legislation, and supporting Yrigoyen's landmark state oil concern, YPF; but his wholesale replacement of Yrigoyen appointees threw the populist leader and Vice President González against Alvear, in whose defense nine Argentine Senators left the UCR. Citing Yrigoyen's 18 gubernatorial removals (including numerous ones from his own party, and in all but one of Argentina's 14 provinces at the time), they contended that the former president had imposed a "personality cult", and established the Antipersonalist UCR (UCRA). The schism became official in 1924, when the two factions presented different candidates for that year's congressional elections.

The Antipersonalists were themselves beset by disunity, however. Five "dissident" UCR groups presented candidates in 1924, and, representing provincial interests as they did, no one faction could claim the "antipersonalist" mantle. These differed not only in their geography; but also in their ideology. The most well-established group, led by Senator Leopoldo Melo and endorsed by President Alvear, were closely associated with the landowning elite, particularly that of Buenos Aires Province, incorporated much of the declining Conservative Party, and were the least amenable to reform. The leader of the Unified UCR, Santa Fe Governor Enrique Mosca, was, likewise, conservative, whereas the Mendoza faction, led by Governor Carlos Washington Lencinas (the Lencinist UCR), was more liberal than Yrigoyen's own.

Ultimately, an acrimonious campaign atmosphere, as well as a shortage of prescient issues amid continuing prosperity, helped result in the lowest turnout since the advent of universal (male) suffrage. Yrigoyen's UCR bore the brunt of the resulting losses, giving up 19 seats in the Lower House, and, in contests held in April, 1925, 6 of their 15 seats in the Senate (though this latter was partly the result of UCRA defections). The party won only in Buenos Aires Province, where the opposition remained dominated by the Conservatives. The UCR's losses were most notable in the City of Buenos Aires, where the Socialist Party regained majorities in both the congressional delegation and City Council they had lost to the UCR in 1918. Provincial parties (as well as province-specific UCR groups) did well, and deprived the UCRA of fully benefiting from the shift.

The elections handed no one faction of the fragmented UCR a victory; nor did it give their competitors in the reformist field (Socialists and Democratic Progressives) reason to believe they could supplant Yrigoyen in the foreseeable future. The real winner, however, was arguably President Alvear himself, who, by both default and reputation, would now be the final arbiter over the many, ongoing disputes between Antipersonalists, who nursed old wounds dating from Yrigoyen's "interventions," and Yrigoyen's faction of the UCR, who staked their future on the populist leader's return to the Presidency in 1928.

== Results ==
Party or alliance		Votes	%	Seats	
Party or alliance		Votes	%	Won	Total
Radical Civic Union		181,179	27.21	26	70
Conservative Parties	Conservative Party	35,901	5.39	8	–
Conservative Parties	Democratic Party of Córdoba	27,634	4.15	6	–
Conservative Parties	Autonomist–Liberal Pact	25,692	3.86	2	–
Conservative Parties	Popular Concentration	20,084	3.02	1	–
Conservative Parties	Liberal Party of Tucumán	15,058	2.26	2	–
Conservative Parties	Liberal Party of Mendoza	9,009	1.35	1	–
Conservative Parties	Liberal Democratic Party	7,175	1.08	2	–
Conservative Parties	Popular Party	5,773	0.87	0	–
Conservative Parties	Total	146,326	21.97	22	40
Socialist Party		101,785	15.29	16	19
Unified Radical Civic Union		75,105	11.28	9	9
Antipersonalist Radical Civic Union		46,435	6.97	3	3
Dissident Radicalism	Opposition Radical Civic Union	14,661	2.20	0	—
Dissident Radicalism	Principist Radical Civic Union	6,621	0.99	0	—
Dissident Radicalism	Bascarista Radical Civic Union	4,524	0.68	0	—
Dissident Radicalism	Red Radical Civic Union	2,849	0.43	0	—
Dissident Radicalism	Blue Radical Civic Union	2,841	0.43	0	—
Dissident Radicalism	Verista Radical Civic Union	2,429	0.36	0	—
Dissident Radicalism	Personalist Radical Civic Union	2,273	0.34	0	—
Dissident Radicalism	Dissident Radical Civic Union (Castro Committee)	2,225	0.33	0	—
Dissident Radicalism	Yrigoyenist Radical Civic Union	1,456	0.22	0	—
Dissident Radicalism	Total	39,879	5.99	0	5
Democratic Progressive Party		37,996	5.71	3	6
Lencinist Radical Civic Union		15,485	2.33	2	4
Communist Party of Argentina		4,498	0.68	0	0
Public Health Party		1,431	0.21	0	0
National Feminist Party		1,313	0.20	0	0
Georgist Liberal Party		1,226	0.18	0	0
Unitarian Party		903	0.14	0	0
Railway Workers		766	0.12	0	0
Independent Workers Party		740	0.11	0	0
Others		9,869	1.48	0	0
Independents		949	0.14	0	0
Blockist Radical Civic Union				–	2
Total		665,885	100.00	81	158
Valid votes		665,885	93.93		
Invalid votes		144	0.02		
Blank votes		42,899	6.05		
Total votes		708,928	100.00		
Registered voters/turnout		1,502,566	47.18		
Source: Ministry of the Interior Cantón, Chamber of Deputies
