= 2011 North Miami mayoral election =

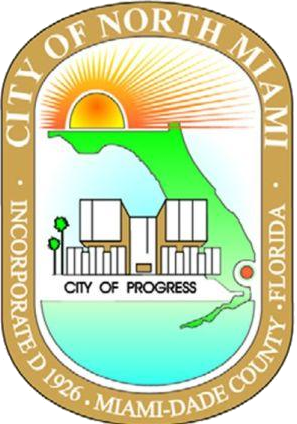
- May 10, 2011
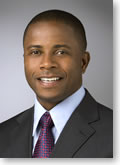

Candidate	Andre Pierre	Carol Keys
Party	Nonpartisan	Nonpartisan
Popular vote	3,020	2,551
Percentage	51.69%	43.66%
Mayor before election
Andre Pierre
Nonpartisan
Elected mayor
Andre Pierre
Nonpartisan

The 2011 North Miami mayoral election took place on May 10, 2011. Incumbent Mayor Andre Pierre, who was first elected in 2009, ran for re-election to a second term. He was challenged by attorney Carol Keys and former City Councilman Jacques Despinosse.

Pierre, whose profile was raised after the 2010 Haiti earthquake as he emerged as an advocate for Haitian Americans, faced controversy over city spending and corruption allegations. During the campaign, Richard Brutus, Pierre's nephew and campaign manager, was arrested by the Florida Department of Law Enforcement for accepting $7,500 in bribes as part of an investigation that also involved fictitious contributions to Pierre's campaign. Despinosse and Keys attacked Pierre for driving a $100,000 Porsche Panamera, which he had received as a gift but not included in financial disclosures.

Despite the controversies, Pierre won re-election, narrowly avoiding a runoff election. He received 51.7 percent of the vote to Keys's 43.7 percent and Despinosse's 4.7 percent.

== General election ==
=== Candidates ===
- Andre Pierre, incumbent Mayor
- Carol Keys, activist, lawyer
- Jacques Despinosse, former City Councilman

=== Results ===
2011 North Miami mayoral election results
Party	Candidate	Votes	%
Nonpartisan	Andre Pierre (inc.)	3,020	51.69%
Nonpartisan	Carol Keys	2,551	43.66%
Nonpartisan	Jacques Despinosse	272	4.66%
Total votes		5,843	100.00%
