= 2007 Madeiran regional election =

- 6 May 2007

47 seats to the Legislative Assembly of Madeira 24 seats needed for a majority
- Turnout: 60.7% ▲0.3 pp
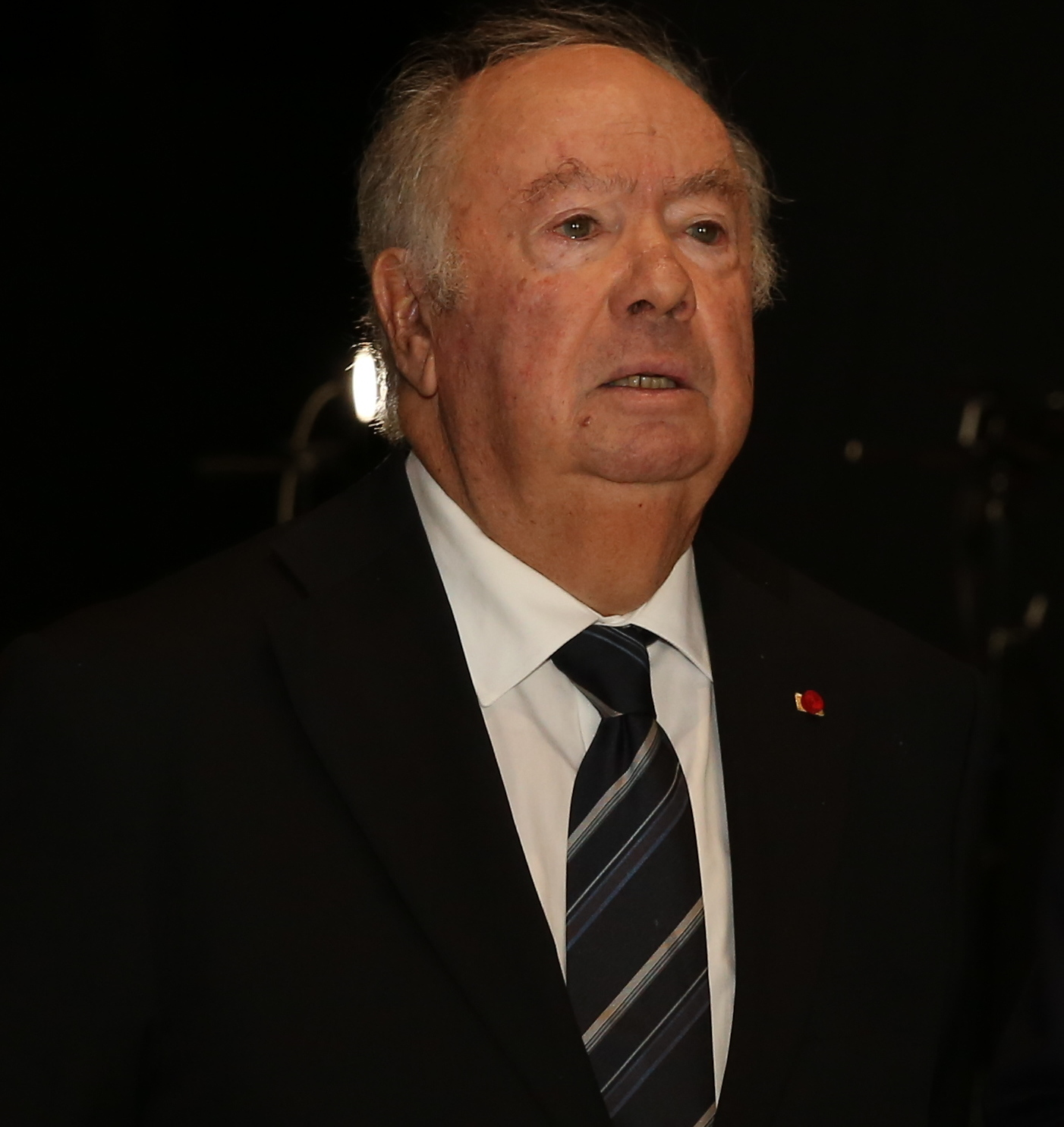

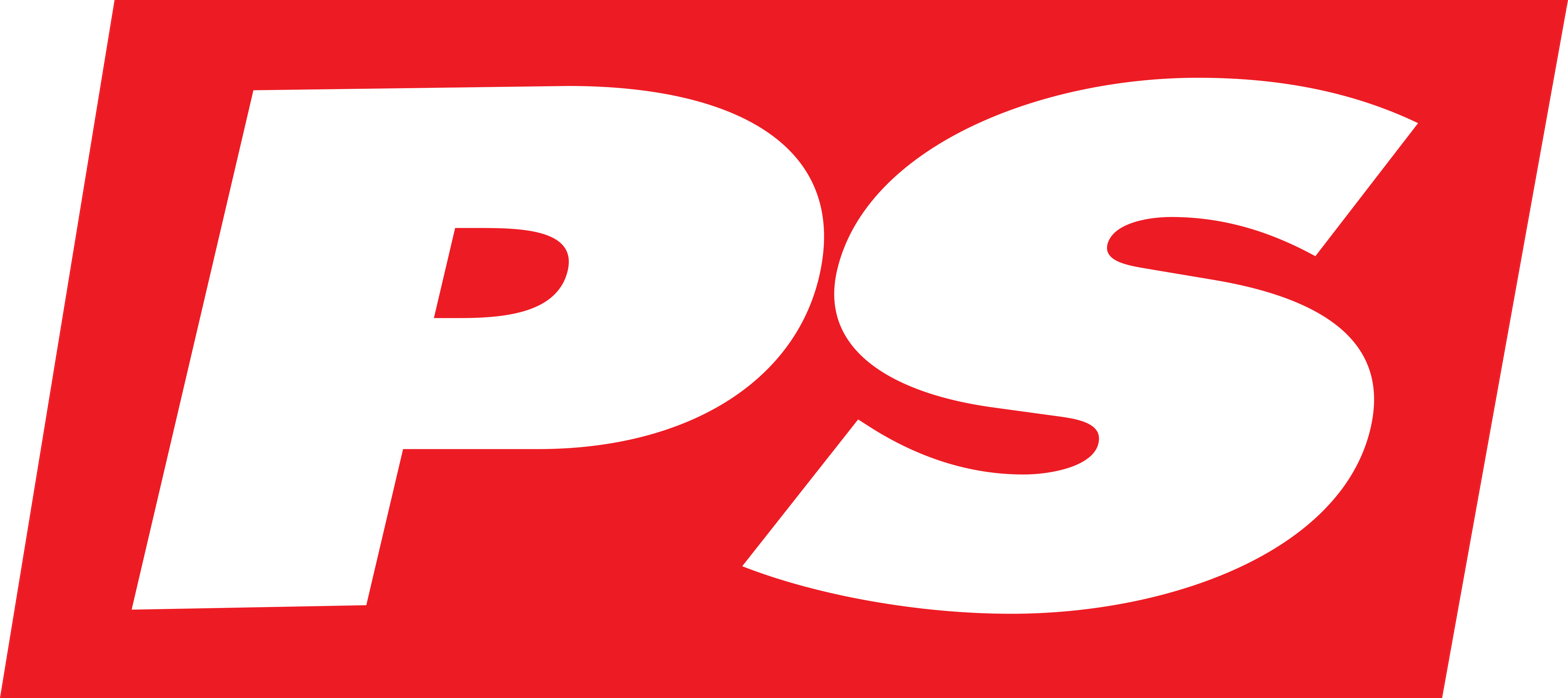

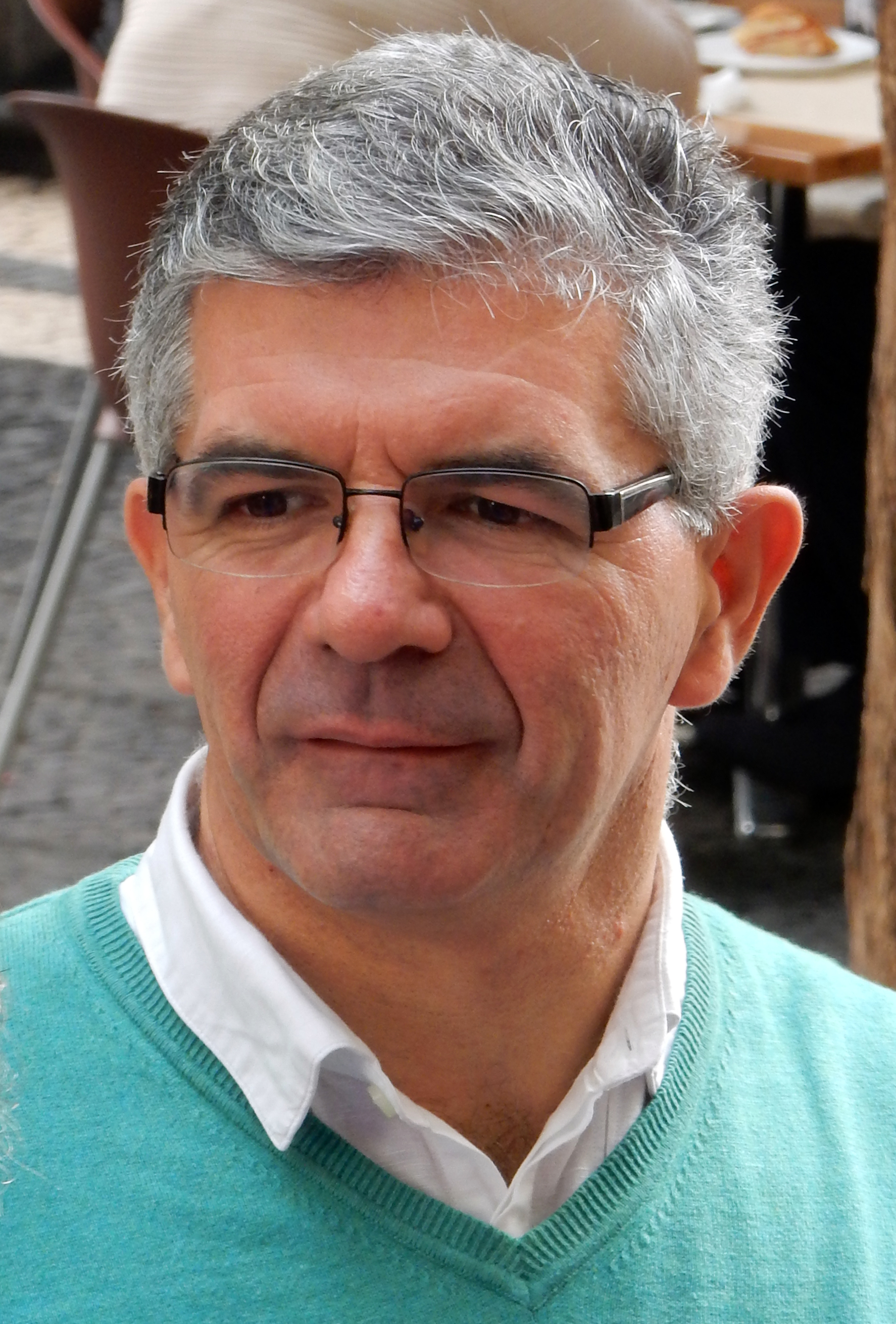

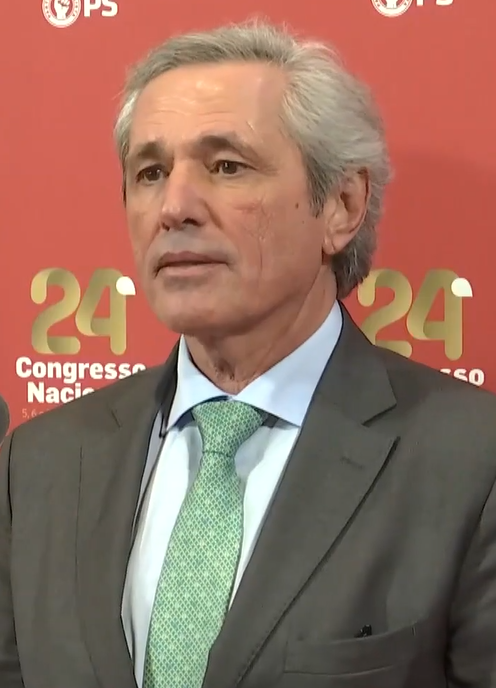

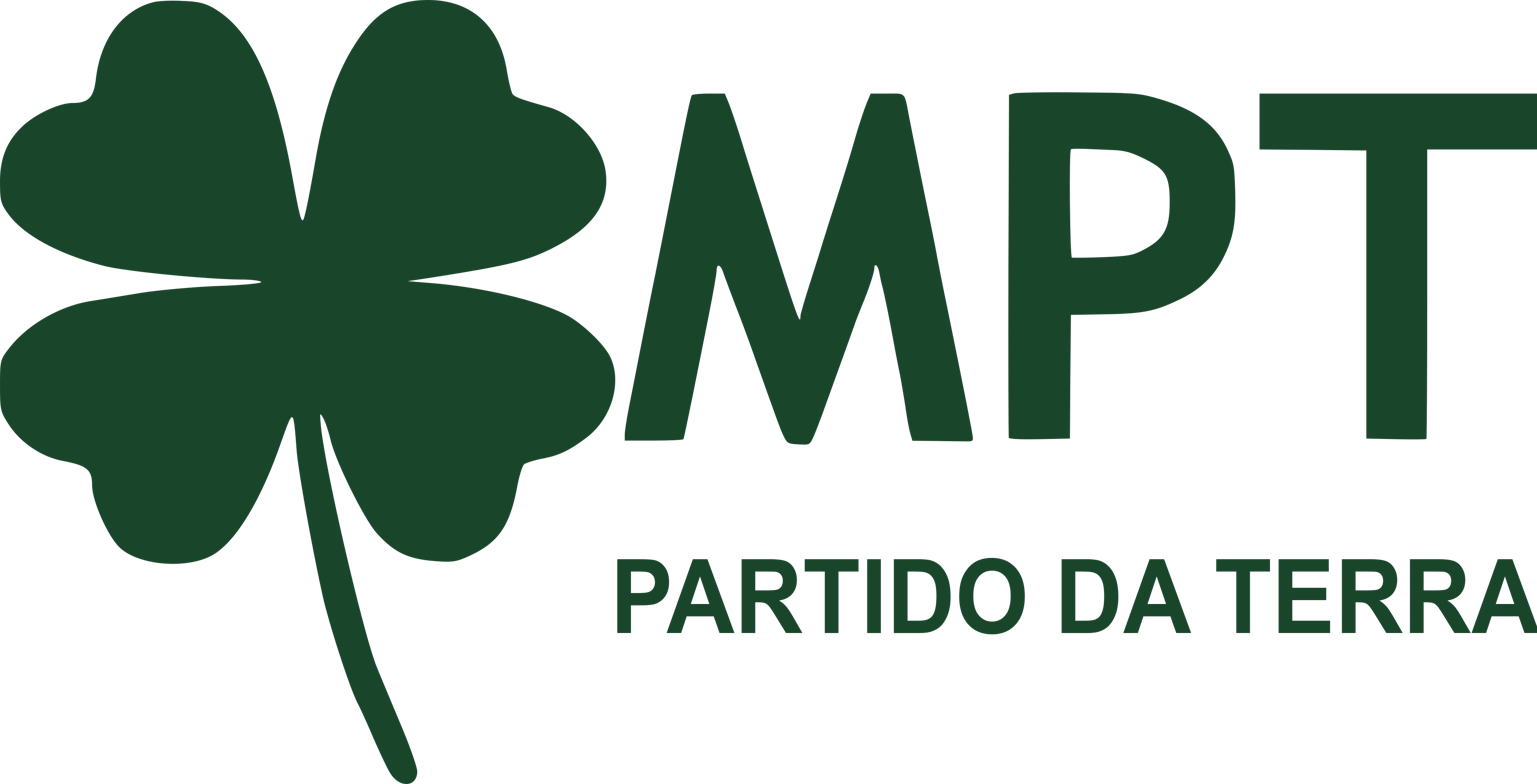

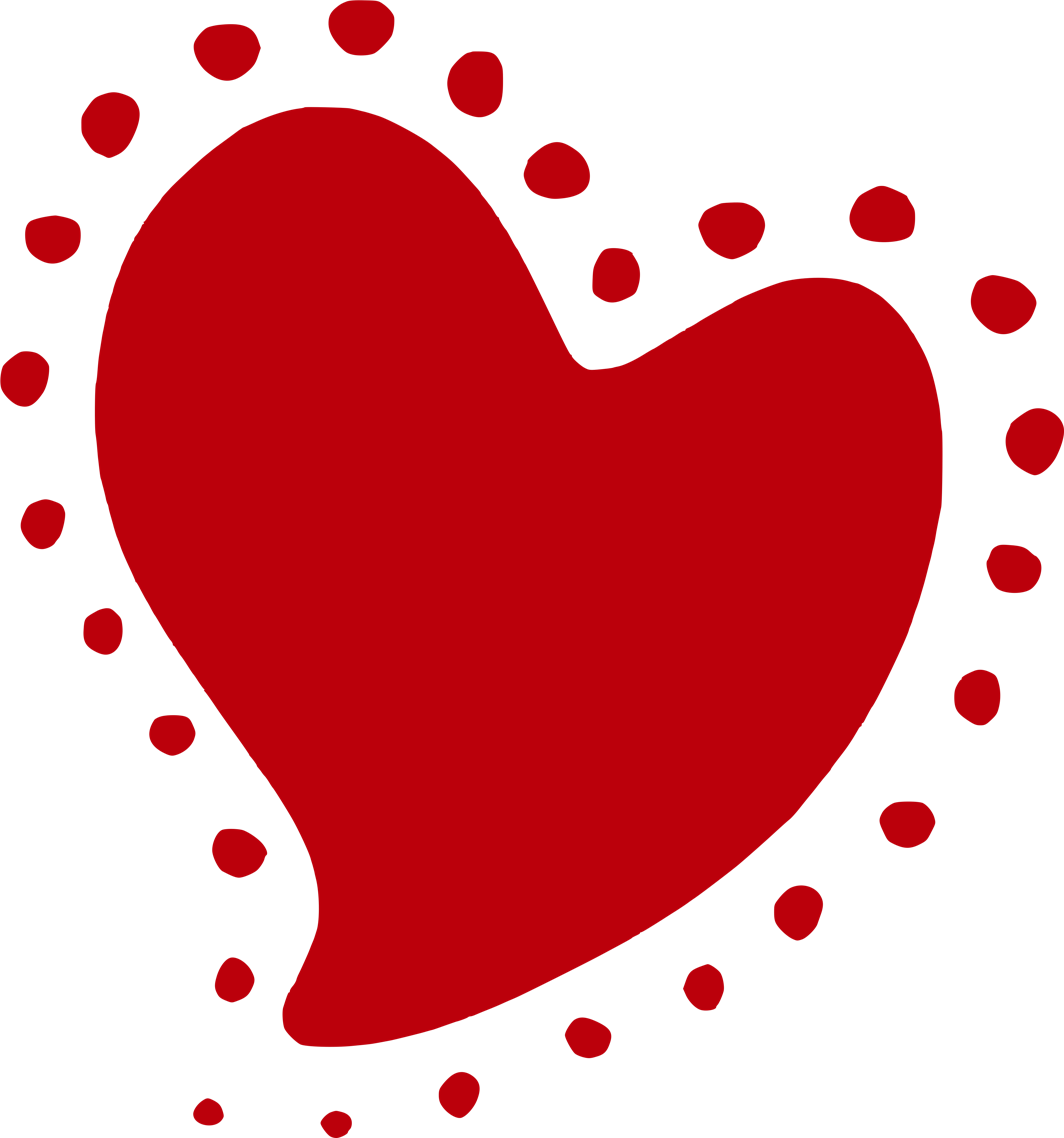
	First party	Second party	Third party
Leader	Alberto João Jardim	Jacinto Serrão de Freitas	Edgar Silva
Party	PSD	PS	CDU
Last election	44 seats, 53.7%	19 seats, 27.4%	2 seats, 5.5%
Seats won	33	7	2
Seat change	▼11	▼12	0
Popular vote	90,377	21,692	7,650
Percentage	64.2%	15.4%	5.4%
Swing	▲10.5 pp	▼12.0 pp	▼0.1 pp
	Fourth party	Fifth party	Sixth party
Leader	José Manuel Rodrigues	Paulo Martins	João Gonçalves
Party	CDS–PP	BE	MPT
Last election	2 seats, 7.0%	1 seat, 3.7%	Did not contest
Seats won	2	1	1
Seat change	0	0	▲1
Popular vote	7,519	4,186	3,175
Percentage	5.3%	3.0%	2.3%
Swing	▼1.7 pp	▼0.7 pp	New party
	Seventh party
Leader	Baltasar de Aguiar
Party	PND
Last election	Did not contest
Seats won	1
Seat change	▲1
Popular vote	2,931
Percentage	2.1%
Swing	New party
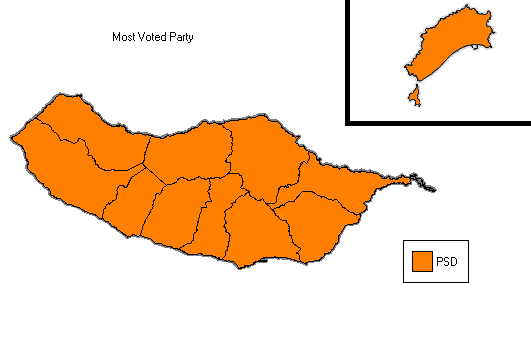
- The most voted party in each municipality.
President before election
Alberto João Jardim
PSD
Elected President
Alberto João Jardim
PSD

A regional election was held in Madeira on 6 May 2007, to determine the composition of the Legislative Assembly of the Autonomous Region of Madeira. The election was a snap election, as it was original schedule to only happen in October 2008. The election was called after the President of the Regional Government, Alberto João Jardim, resigned after his government clashed with the Socialist Prime Minister José Sócrates due to the new regional finance law approved by the Sócrates government. Jardim defended that the new law was harmful for Madeira's interests. By this time, the Social Democratic Party (PSD) had been in power, nonstop, since 1976.

The election was a huge landslide for the PSD and Alberto João Jardim. He won one of the biggest landslides in Madeira electoral history, winning more than 64 percent of the votes and 70 percent of the members of the regional parliament. The PSD won, once again, in all 11 municipalities of the region. The Socialists suffered a huge setback in these elections winning just 15 percent of the votes and 7 seats, although the number of total members was reduced to 47 due to a new electoral system.

The smaller parties, CDS, CDU and BE, also saw their shares decrease and CDU, led by the Portuguese Communist Party, was able to pull ahead of the People's Party (CDS-PP). The Left Bloc (BE) had, like CDU, minor losses and was able to hold on to their sole seat. But other smaller parties gained representation for the first time. The Earth Party (MPT) and the New Democracy Party (PND) gained, both, one seat and polled above 2 percent.

Turnout in these elections increased very slightly compared with 3 years ago, with 60.8 percent of voters casting a ballot.

== Electoral system ==
Before this election, members of the regional parliament were elected in 11 constituencies, representing the 11 municipalities of Madeira, that were awarded a determined number of member to elect according with the number of registered voters in those constituencies. The method used to elect the members was the D'Hondt method. For the 2007 elections, the system changed and members of the regional parliament would now be elected by a single constituency, coinciding with the territory of the Region. The method used, to elect members, would continue to be the D'Hondt method. The total number of members was also reduced from the 68, in the 2004 elections, to 47 in the 2007 elections.

== Parties ==
The parties that partook in the election, and their leaders, were:

- Left Bloc (BE), Paulo Martinho Martins
- Unitary Democratic Coalition (CDU), Edgar Silva
- Earth Party (MPT), João Gonçalves
- New Democracy Party (PND), Baltasar de Carvalho Machado Gonçalves de Aguiar
- Socialist Party (PS), Jacinto Serrão de Freitas
- Social Democratic Party (PSD), Alberto João Jardim
- People's Party (CDS–PP), José Manuel Rodrigues

== Opinion polling ==
Exit poll

Polling firm/Link	Date Released	PSD	PS	CDS–PP	CDU	BE	O	Lead
2007 regional election	6 May 2007	64.2; 33	15.4; 7	5.3; 2	5.4; 2	3.0; 1	6.7; 2	48.8
UCP–CESOP	6 May 2007	62–67	14–17	4–6	5–7	2–4	—N/a	48–50
Eurosondagem	6 May 2007	67.1–70.9	11.2–14.8	4.4–6.6	3.0–5.2	1.5–2.9	—N/a	55.9– 56.1
Intercampus	2 May 2007	61.5	19.5	5.0	6.2	5.0	2.6	42.0
UCP–CESOP	29 Apr 2007	66	16	5	4	3	6	50
Eurosondagem	27 Apr 2007	58.0	24.5	4.7	5.3	3.6	3.9	33.5
Eurosondagem	24 Apr 2007	59.3	23.8	4.8	5.2	3.3	3.6	35.5
Eurosondagem	23 Feb 2007	59.1	25.0	5.9	4.8	3.4	1.8	34.1
2004 regional election	17 Oct 2004	53.7; 44	27.4; 19	7.0; 2	5.5; 2	3.7; 1	2.7; 0	26.3

== Summary of votes and seats ==
Summary of the 6 May 2007 Legislative Assembly of Madeira elections results
Graph of the party split among 47 seats.
Parties	Votes	%	±pp swing	MPs				
Parties	Votes	%	±pp swing	2004	2007	±	%	±
Social Democratic	90,377	64.24	▲10.5	44	33	▼11	70.21	▲5.5
Socialist	21,692	15.42	▼12.0	19	7	▼12	14.89	▼13.0
Unitary Democratic Coalition	7,650	5.44	▼0.1	2	2	0	4.26	▲1.3
People's	7,519	5.34	▼1.7	2	2	0	4.26	▲1.3
Left Bloc	4,186	2.98	▼0.7	1	1	0	2.13	▲0.7
Earth	3,175	2.26	—N/a	—N/a	1	—N/a	2.13	—N/a
New Democracy	2,931	2.08	—N/a	—N/a	1	—N/a	2.13	—N/a
Total valid	137,530	97.75	▲0.4	68	47	▼21	100.00	0.0
Blank ballots	1,148	0.82	▼0.2					
Invalid ballots	2,019	1.43	▼0.2					
Total	140,697	100.00						
Registered voters/turnout	231,606	60.75	▲0.3					
Source: Comissão Nacional de Eleições

Vote share
PSD	64.24%
PS	15.42%
CDU	5.44%
CDS-PP	5.34%
BE	2.98%
MPT	2.26%
PND	2.08%
Blank/Invalid	2.25%

Parliamentary seats
PSD	70.21%
PS	14.89%
CDU	4.26%
CDS-PP	4.26%
BE	2.13%
MPT	2.13%
PND	2.13%

=== Maps ===
Most voted political force by municipality.

== See also ==
- Madeira
