= November 2011 San Francisco general election =

The November 2011 San Francisco general elections were held on November 8, 2011, in San Francisco, California. The elections included those for San Francisco mayor, district attorney, and sheriff, and eight ballot measures.

== District attorney ==
George Gascón, the former Chief of the San Francisco Police Department appointed by then-Mayor Gavin Newsom to replace Kamala Harris, ran for his first election.

San Francisco district attorney election, 2011
Candidate	Votes	%
George Gascón (incumbent)	75,628	41.61
David Onek	42,765	23.53
Sharmin Bock	37,717	20.75
Bill Fazio	19,072	10.49
Vu Vuong Trinh	6,555	3.61
Write-in	0	0
Valid votes	181,737	93.04%
Invalid or blank votes	13,586	6.96
Total votes	195,323	100
Turnout	{{{votes}}}	42.46%
Ranked choice voting — Pass 3
George Gascón (incumbent)	99,480	62.39
David Onek	59,976	37.61
Eligible votes	159,456	81.64%
Exhausted votes	35,867	18.36%
Total votes	195,323	100

Candidate	Pass 1	Pass 2	Pass 3
George Gascón	75,628	83,146	99,480
David Onek	42,765	46,997	59,976
Sharmin Bock	37,717	43,965	
Bill Fazio	19,072		
Vu Vuong Trinh	6,555		
Write-in	0		
Eligible Ballots	181,737	174,108	159,456
Exhausted Ballots	13,586	21,215	35,867
Total	195,323	195,323	195,323

== Sheriff ==
Incumbent Sheriff Michael Hennessey did not seek reelection.

San Francisco sheriff election, 2011
Candidate	Votes	%
Ross Mirkarimi	69,605	38.36
Chris Cunnie	51,146	28.18
Paul Miyamoto	49,414	27.23
David Wong	11,305	6.23
Write-in	0	0
Valid votes	181,470	92.91%
Invalid or blank votes	13,853	7.09
Total votes	195,323	100
Turnout	{{{votes}}}	42.46%
Ranked choice voting — Pass 3
Ross Mirkarimi	85,608	53.25
Paul Miyamoto	74,548	46.55
Eligible votes	160,156	82.00%
Exhausted votes	35,167	18.00%
Total votes	195,323	100

Candidate	Pass 1	Pass 2	Pass 3
Ross Mirkarimi	69,605	71,613	85,608
Paul Miyamoto	49,414	53,933	74,548
Chris Cunnie	51,146	52,745	
David Wong	11,305		
Write-in	0		
Eligible Ballots	181,470	178,291	160,156
Exhausted Ballots	13,853	17,032	35,167
Total	195,323	195,323	195,323

== Propositions ==
Note: "City" refers to the San Francisco municipal government.

=== Proposition A ===

Proposition A would authorize the San Francisco Unified School District to issue up to $531 million in bonds, funded by a property tax increase, to modernize and repair school facilities, and create a citizens' oversight committee to monitor expenditures. This proposition required a majority of 55% to pass.

Proposition A
Choice	Votes	%
For	134,695	71.10
Against	54,750	28.90
Required majority		55.00
Total	189,445	100.00
Valid votes	189,445	96.31
Invalid/blank votes	7,251	3.69
Total votes	196,696	100.00
Registered voters/turnout		42.36

=== Proposition B ===

Proposition B would authorize the city to issue $248 million in bonds for the repair and improvement of streets, bicycling paths, and pedestrian and traffic infrastructure. This proposition required a two-thirds majority to pass.

Proposition B
Choice	Votes	%
For	129,123	68.01
Against	60,733	31.99
Required majority		66.67
Total	189,856	100.00
Valid votes	189,856	96.52
Invalid/blank votes	6,840	3.48
Total votes	196,696	100.00
Registered voters/turnout		42.36

=== Proposition C ===

Proposition C would adjust pension contribution rates for current and future City employees, implement limits on future pension benefits and increases, require all City employees to contribute to their retiree health care costs, among other changes to the City pension system. This was submitted to the ballot to counter Proposition D below.

Proposition C
Choice	Votes	%
For	129,511	68.90
Against	58,445	31.10
Total	187,956	100.00
Valid votes	187,956	95.56
Invalid/blank votes	8,740	4.44
Total votes	196,696	100.00
Registered voters/turnout		42.36

=== Proposition D ===

Proposition D would adjust pension contribution rates for current and future City employees, implement limits on future pension benefits and increases, prohibit the city from picking up the cost of employee's contributions to pension benefits, among other changes to the City pension system. This was submitted to the ballot to counter Proposition C above.

Proposition D
Choice	Votes	%
For	62,349	33.46
Against	124,002	66.54
Total	186,351	100.00
Valid votes	186,351	94.74
Invalid/blank votes	10,345	5.26
Total votes	196,696	100.00
Registered voters/turnout		42.36

=== Proposition E ===

Proposition E would allow ballot measures submitted by the Mayor or the Board of Supervisors on or after January 1, 2012, and subsequently approved by voters, to be amended or repealed by two-thirds of the Board three years after passage, and by a majority seven years after passage.

Proposition E
Choice	Votes	%
For	59,356	32.87
Against	121,202	67.13
Total	180,558	100.00
Valid votes	180,558	91.80
Invalid/blank votes	16,138	8.20
Total votes	196,696	100.00
Registered voters/turnout		42.36

=== Proposition F ===

Proposition F would decrease disclosure requirements of campaign consultants to the San Francisco Ethics Commission.

Proposition F
Choice	Votes	%
For	77,240	43.89
Against	98,761	56.11
Total	176,001	100.00
Valid votes	176,001	89.48
Invalid/blank votes	20,695	10.52
Total votes	196,696	100.00
Registered voters/turnout		42.36

=== Proposition G ===

Proposition G would increase the sales tax by 0.5% for a period of ten years or until the California state government instates a sales tax hike of 1% or more for at least one year. This proposition required a two-thirds majority to pass.

Proposition G
Choice	Votes	%
For	86,033	46.12
Against	100,490	53.88
Required majority		66.67
Total	186,523	100.00
Valid votes	186,523	94.83
Invalid/blank votes	10,173	5.17
Total votes	196,696	100.00
Registered voters/turnout		42.36

=== Proposition H ===

Proposition H would make it City policy that school admissions be based primarily on the student's proximity to neighborhood schools.

Proposition H
Choice	Votes	%
For	91,514	49.97
Against	91,629	50.03
Total	183,143	100.00
Valid votes	183,143	93.11
Invalid/blank votes	13,553	6.89
Total votes	196,696	100.00
Registered voters/turnout		42.36
