= 2011 Kansas City mayoral election =

- February 22, 2011 (primary); March 22, 2011 (general)
- Turnout: 16.24% (primary); 22.06% (general)
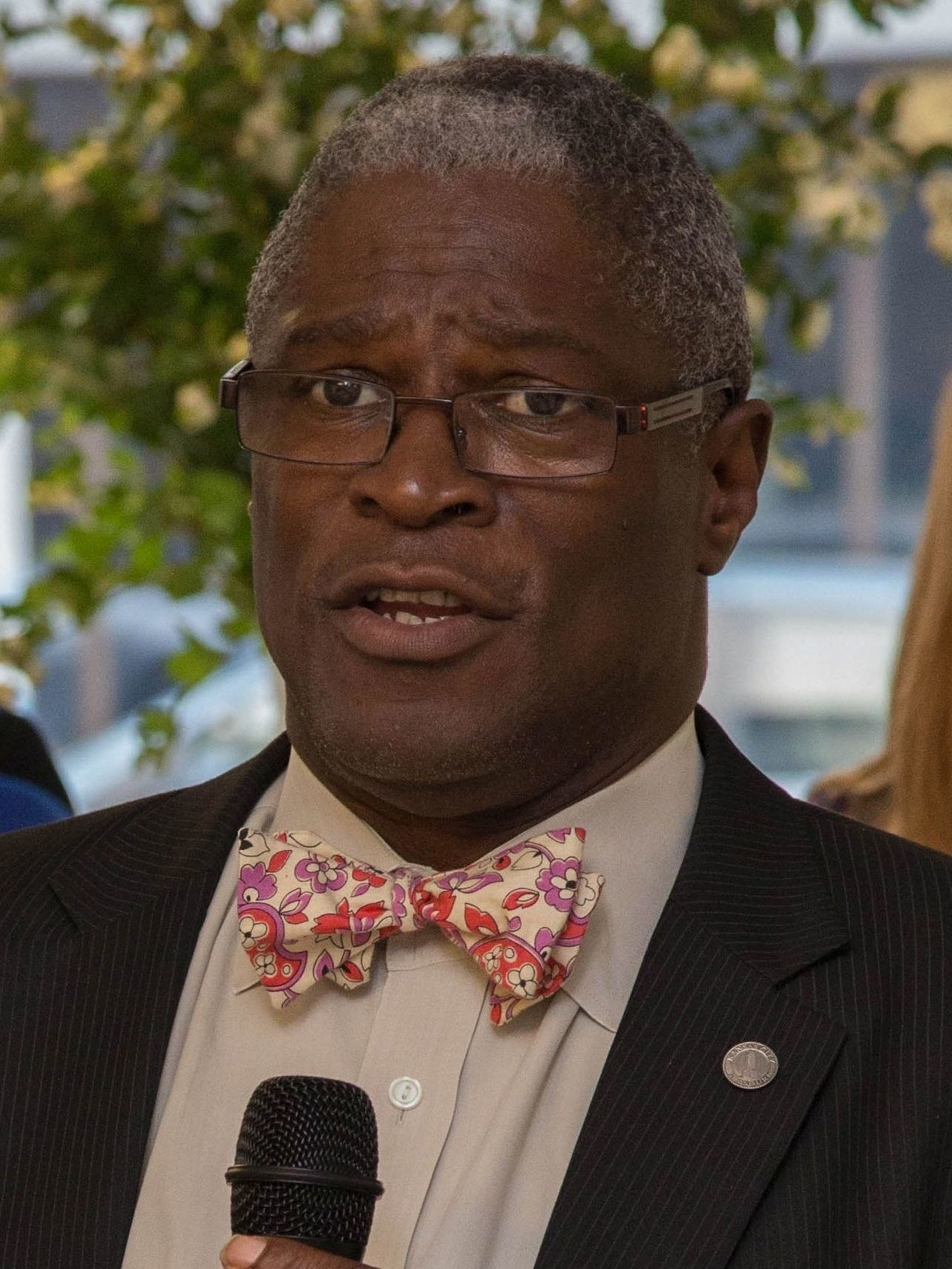

| Candidate | Sly James | Mike Burke |
| Party | nonpartisan candidate | nonpartisan candidate |
| Popular vote | 31,794 | 18,736 |
| Percentage | 62.92% | 37.08% |
Mayor before election
Mark Funkhouser
Democratic
Elected mayor
Sly James
Democratic

The 2011 Kansas City mayoral election was held February 22 and March 22, 2011 to elect the mayor of Kansas City, Missouri. It saw the election of Sly James, who unseated incumbent mayor Mark Funkhouser (who was eliminated in the primary).

== Results ==
=== Primary ===
First round results
| Party | Candidate | Votes | % |
|---|---|---|---|
| Nonpartisan | Sly James | 12,105 | 32.43 |
| Nonpartisan | Mike Burke | 8,966 | 24.02 |
| Nonpartisan | Mark Funkhouser (incumbent) | 6,571 | 17.60 |
| Nonpartisan | Jim Rowland | 6,046 | 16.20 |
| Nonpartisan | Deb Hermann | 2,565 | 6.87 |
| Nonpartisan | Henry Klein | 561 | 1.50 |
| Nonpartisan | Charles B. Wheeler | 421 | 1.13 |
| Write-in | Write-ins | 93 | 0.25 |
| Total votes | | 37,328 | |

=== General election ===
General election results
| Party | Candidate | Votes | % |
|---|---|---|---|
| Nonpartisan | Sly James | 31,794 | 62.92 |
| Nonpartisan | Mike Burke | 18,736 | 37.08 |
| Total votes | | 50,530 | |
