= 2011 Syrian local elections =

Syrian local elections, 2011
- 12 December 2011

Local elections were held across Syria on 12 December 2011 to elect 17,629 councillors in 1,355 administrative units. Some 42,000 candidates contested the elections. The election took place on the second day of an opposition called general strike, with the Arab and Kurdish opposition boycotting the election. The Syrian government claimed the elections were a success and enjoyed a high turnout, however turnout in many parts of the country was seen as low.

== Background ==
The elections occur amidst the backdrop of the opening stages of the Syrian Civil War, which had initially started as protests and had evolved into increasingly violent confrontations. By December 2011 the Civil Uprising phase of the Civil War was mostly over, with the conflict taking an increasingly militaristic direction and significant fighting taking place across the country, particularly in the governorates of Idlib, Hama, Daraa, Deir ez-Zor, and Rif Dimashq. The crisis had begun in March 2011, and by the local elections in December 2011 an estimates 5,000 people had been killed.

In the face of increasing unrest the Syrian government framed the elections as part of a wider reform agenda, claiming that a new local administration law brought in during August 2011 had granted local administrations more powers and financial independence. Other changes cited by the government included the elections being overseen by judicial committees as opposed to the Interior Ministry, and a change from a prior closed-list electoral system that guaranteed 50% of all municipal seats for the Ba'athist led National Progressive Front to a system without lists where citizens could vote for any candidate. More than 14.5 million Syrians were eligible to vote, including thousands of Kurds who had been granted citizenship by a Presidential decree in April 2011.
