= 2011 San Antonio mayoral election =

- May 14, 2011
- Turnout: 7.07% ▼
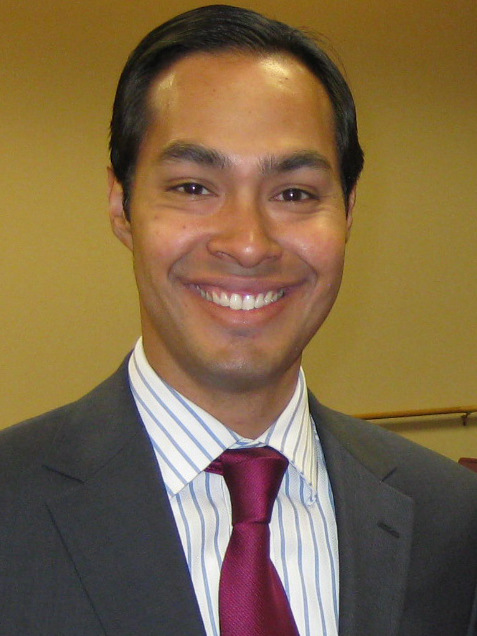

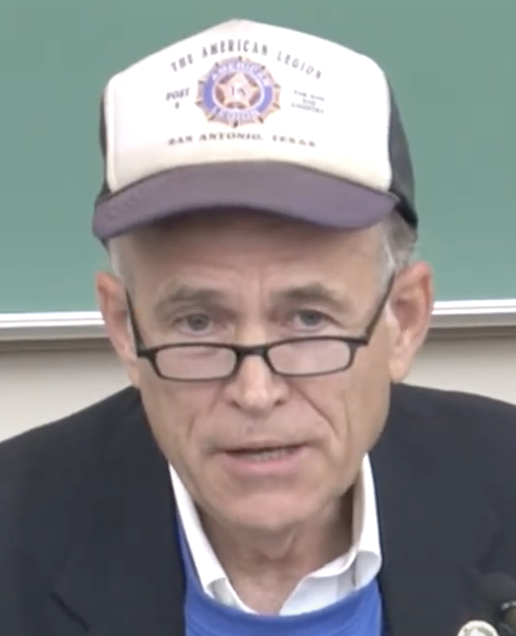
Candidate	Julian Castro	Will McLeod	Rhett R. Smith
Popular vote	34,309	2,846	2,153
Percentage	81.44%	6.76%	5.11%
Mayor before election
Julian Castro
Elected mayor
Julian Castro

On May 14, 2011, the city of San Antonio, Texas held an election to choose who would serve as Mayor of San Antonio for a two-year term to expire in 2013. Julian Castro, the incumbent Mayor, was re-elected with over 81% of the vote, earning a second term. The election was officially nonpartisan as prescribed by Texas law.

== Background ==
Julian Castro, who was first elected mayor in the 2009 mayoral election, opted to seek re-election as mayor. The three main challengers that challenged him in 2009 (Trish DeBerry-Mejia, Diane Cibrian and Sheila McNeil), opted not to seek a re-match, and at the closing of the filing period, faced only four challengers.

=== Declared ===
- Julian Castro, incumbent Mayor of San Antonio.
- Michael "Commander" Idrogo
- Will McLeod
- James Rodriguez
- Rhett R. Smith

== Results ==
On May 14, 2011, the election for Mayor was held. Julian Castro secured re-election with over 81% of the vote, thus negating the need of a runoff election (which would have been required if no candidate got 50%+1 of all votes cast).

San Antonio Mayor, 2011 Regular election, May 14, 2011
Candidate		Votes	%	±
✓	Julian Castro	34,309	81.44%	+25.21%
	Will McLeod	2,846	6.76%	
	Rhett R. Smith	2,153	5.11%	+4.17%
	James Rodriguez	1,675	3.98%	
	Michael "Commander" Idrogo	1,145	2.72%	+2.23%
Turnout		42,128	5.66%*	

* Vote percentage include all of Bexar County with a total of 10,538 either voting in another municipal election, casting a spoiled vote or casting no ballot for San Antonio mayor.
