= Municipalities of Argentina =

A municipality (Spanish: municipios) is one form of a country subdivision of Argentina. It is a city, town, or township, which is – below the department level – part of a province different from Buenos Aires Province. The provinces organize the municipalities in their territories according to their own municipal regime.
