= 2011 Nashville mayoral election =

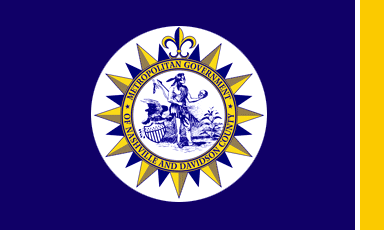
- August 4, 2011
- Turnout: 19.71%
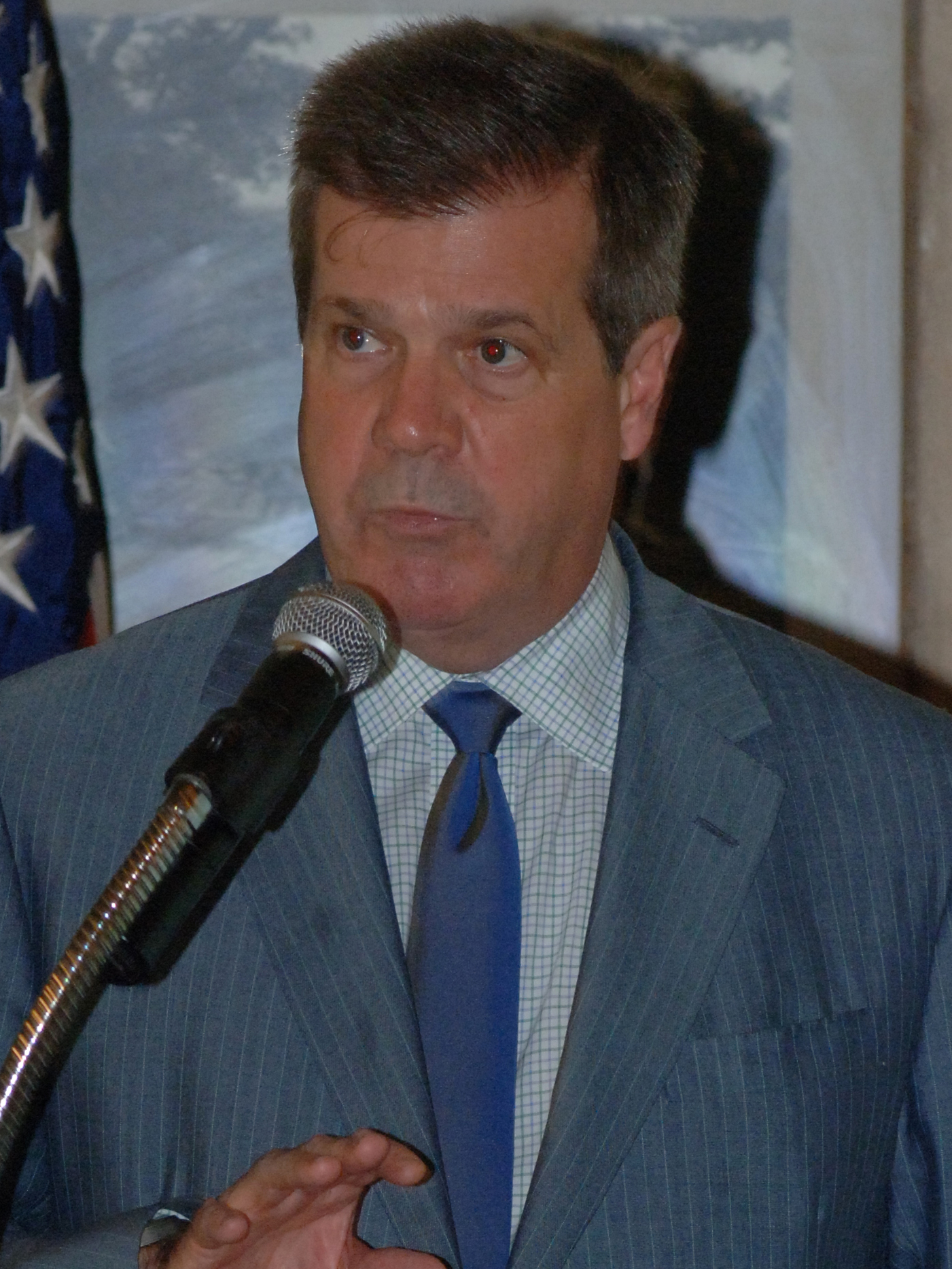

Candidate	Karl Dean	James Keeton
Popular vote	50,391	6,661
Percentage	79.13%	10.46%
Candidate	Marvin Barnes
Popular vote	4,220
Percentage	6.63%
Mayor before election
Karl Dean
Democratic
Elected mayor
Karl Dean
Democratic

The 2011 Nashville mayoral election took place on August 4, 2011. Incumbent Mayor Karl Dean, who was first elected in 2007, ran for re-election. He was originally challenged by Metro Councilman Michael Craddock, but Craddock dropped out of the race on May 26, 2011, citing fundraising difficulties. Following Craddock's withdrawal, Dean did not face serious opposition. He ended up winning re-election in a landslide, receiving 79 percent of the vote and avoiding the need for a runoff election.

== Candidates ==
- Karl Dean, incumbent Mayor
- James Keeton
- Marvin Barnes
- Bruce Casper

=== Dropped out ===
- Michael Craddock, Metro Councilman

== Results ==
2011 Nashville mayoral election
Party	Candidate	Votes	%
Nonpartisan	Karl Dean (inc.)	50,391	79.13%
Nonpartisan	James Keeton	6,661	10.46%
Nonpartisan	Marvin Barnes	4,220	6.63%
Nonpartisan	Bruce Casper	1,810	2.84%
Write-in		597	0.94%
Total votes		63,679	100.00%
