= Chris Romer =

American politician

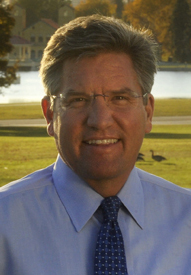

Member of the Colorado Senate from the 32nd district
- In office January 10, 2007 – January 12, 2011
- Preceded by: Donna R. Johnson
- Succeeded by: Irene Aguilar

Personal details
- Born: 1959 (age 66–67) Denver, Colorado, U.S.
- Party: Democratic
- Spouse: Laurie Romer
- Children: 3 daughters

Chris Romer (born 1959) is a former American politician from the U.S. state of Colorado. Elected to the Colorado State Senate as a Democrat in 2006, he represented Senate District 32, which encompasses south Denver. As of 2022, Romer is the CEO of Project Canary, an independent certification organization that measures, tracks, and delivers ESG data across the energy value chain.

On November 30, 2010, Romer announced his candidacy for Mayor of Denver. He then resigned from the state senate, and, after qualifying for the runoff election, lost the race to Michael Hancock.

== Biography ==
Born in Denver, the son of former Colorado governor Roy Romer, Romer graduated from Graland Country Day School and Denver's East High School and then attended Stanford University, earning a bachelor's degree in economics.

Romer has helped to build several public-private mission-driven B-Corp companies, including Guild Education and Project Canary. Project Canary is a B-Corp with a mission to help the oil and gas industry reduce methane leaks and so limit its climate impact. Previously he worked as a financial consultant focusing on biomass energy plants and transit development projects such as Denver Union Station. Romer has worked as a public finance banker with JPMorgan Chase, working on public projects including the Denver International Airport, Children's Hospital, the Denver Center for the Performing Arts, National Jewish Medical and Research Center and FasTracks.

In late 2008, Romer left his position at JPMorgan Chase to work with the Knowledge is Power Program, a Denver network of charter schools. He was named the group's president in December 2008.

At the age of 28, Romer founded the Colorado I Have a Dream Foundation, a non-profit providing mentoring and scholarships to at-risk children; he has also served as its president. He has chaired the Colorado Children's Campaign and served on the boards of the Denver School of Science and Technology, the Metropolitan State College of Denver Foundation, and Open World Learning, as well as Denver's New America Schools, where he spent two years as a volunteer superintendent. He was also a founder and president of Great Education Colorado which advocates for improved funding of Colorado schools and promotes education reform; in 2006, the group proposed an increase in severance taxes provide funding for public schools, but the measure was never placed on the statewide ballot. Romer was also a leader behind Colorado's Amendment 23, a ballot measure approved by voters in 2000 which guarantees state funding levels for Colorado public schools, and a member of the Colorado Supreme Court Nominating Commission. In 2019, Romer founded Project Canary, a public benefit corporation working to change the course of climate change by cutting methane emissions and providing engineering-based certifications and high-fidelity continuous monitoring.

== Legislative career ==
=== 2006 election ===
Romer faced two other candidates for the Democratic Party nomination for the state senate — community activist Jennifer Mello and Rep. Fran Coleman. Romer emphasized his financial and budgetary expertise in the contest, ultimately prevailing over both opponents in the historically Democratic district. In the general election, Romer won election to represent the 32nd Senate District, defeating Republican Dave Lewis with 70 percent of the popular vote.

In December 2006, outgoing Rep. Dan Grossman resigned from the legislature slightly before the end of his term because of newly enacted ethics laws. Instead of appointing Romer to the remainder of Grossman's term, Gov. Bill Owens appointed Donna R. Johnson, Grossman's long-time legislative aide, to the remaining month of the Senate term. Romer supported her brief appointment as a state senator and was sworn in himself on January 10, 2007.

One of Romer's daughters is Rachel Romer Carlson, the founder and CEO of Guild Education.

=== 2007 legislative session ===
In the 2007 session of the General Assembly, Romer served on the Senate Agriculture, Natural Resources & Energy Committee, the Senate Finance Committee, and was vice-chairman of the Senate State, Veterans & Military Affairs Committee. During the session, Romer was also named the chair of a select Senate committee on renewable energy.

During the 2007 legislative session, Romer introduced a proposal to sell operations of the Colorado Lottery to a private firm in order to raise funds for public schools. The proposal would have been referred to Colorado voters in a statewide ballot measure, and would have used the proceeds from the sale to endow a trust fund to support college scholarships, public schools, state parks, and veteran's services. After facing criticism on legal grounds, and from Governor Bill Ritter, who had offered a competing proposal for school funding, Romer pulled the measure from consideration.

Romer also introduced a measure to require that Colorado high school students demonstrate English competency as a requirement for graduation. Garnering support largely from Republicans, the measure passed the state senate, but was voted down in a house committee due to concern over mandating requirements upon local school districts. Romer also joined Republicans in supporting a measure to enact statewide science and math standards, and introduced a measure that created a pilot dual enrollment program for Colorado students.

Although Romer made a number of proposals to amend the state budget, only one — a requirement that private prison operators provide information on cost breakdowns — was adopted.

Following the regular session, Romer served on the legislature's interim committee on allocation of severance tax and federal mineral lease revenues.

=== 2008 legislative session ===
In the 2008 session of the General Assembly, Romer served on the Senate Agriculture, Natural Resources & Energy Committee, the Senate Appropriations Committee, and was vice-chair of both the Senate Finance Committee and the Senate State, Veterans & Military Affairs Committee.

During the 2008 session, Romer floated a proposal to charge a toll Interstate 70 users traveling to mountain ski resorts during weekend rush hours as a way of reducing congestion; the proposal garnered a strong negative reaction and competing suggestions from members of the public. In response to the feedback, Romer proposed a mechanism for citizen participation in a collaborative online bill-drafting process, declaring "I want to have the first Wikipedia bill, where the citizens write the bill." Romer proceeded to create a website using Google Groups to solicit public comment and proposals; he later introduced a bill based in part of suggestions received online. The proposal would charge tolls to low-occupancy vehicles during peak hours, and create reversible HOV lanes. The bill was denounced by legislators representing the I-70 mountain corridor, and was defeated in a house committee. Romer then offered his support to a competing proposal to charge $5 tolls along I-70, which ultimately died for lack of support.

Romer also planned on sponsoring legislation to educate consumers on scams, to create statewide high school graduation standards, to allow homeowners to collect rainwater for irrigation, and to eliminate CSAP testing for high school students. Romer was also the senate sponsor of a proposal to increase severance taxes to provide additional funding for higher education, and sponsored a successful bill creating the Colorado Clean Energy Finance Program to provide below-market rate loans to homeowners for energy efficiency projects.

In the contested 2008 Democratic presidential primaries, Romer supported Barack Obama.

=== 2009 legislative session ===
For the 2009 session of the Colorado General Assembly, Romer was named to seats on the Senate Transportation Committee and the Senate Education Committee, where he served as vice-chair.

After several deaths from carbon monoxide poisoning in his district, Romer pressed for quick consideration of a bill to require carbon monoxide detectors in new homes at the start of the 2009 session; Romer was the bill's Senate co-sponsor. Romer also floated a proposal to alter the inflation formula used to allocate money to education under Colorado's Amendment 23, in order to increase the legislature's flexibility in allocating funds.

Romer introduced legislation changing taxi cab regulations, attempting to increase competition by shifting burden of proof onto parties opposing new cabs. The bill had bi-partisan support.

As part of a comprehensive education package, Romer sponsored Senate Bill 256 which overhauls the state’s education system by rewarding student and teacher performance. Romer remarked, “I think you will hear about this around the country. This is a good move for Colorado and is a big, big deal”.

A bill introduced by Romer to allow in-state tuition to immigrant children, after being amended to become effective upon passage of the federal DREAM Act, failed in the Senate.

=== 2010 legislative session ===
In the 2010 session of the General Assembly, Romer served on the Senate Business, Labor and Technology committee, the Senate Health and Human Services committee, and the Senate Local Government & Energy committee.

During the 2010 session, Romer introduced legislation that would provide tax credits to businesses who re-hire laid-off workers. According to the bill’s note, 7,300 workers would be rehired sooner because of the incentives provided.

Romer introduced Senate Bill 109, the first regulatory medical marijuana bill in the country, stating “I think this is the beginning of the end of the Wild West”. After some heated controversy, Romer helped negotiate a compromise in the legislature, and the Bill was signed into law on June 7, 2010.
