= Donna Johnson =

Donna Johnson may refer to:

- Donna Johnson (mayor), American politician
- Donna Mae Johnson (1929–2016), inspiration for the Charles Schulz character Little Red-Haired Girl
- Donna R. Johnson (born c. 1934), American former legislator and legislative aide in Colorado
