= Stan Romanek =

US con-artist and sex offender

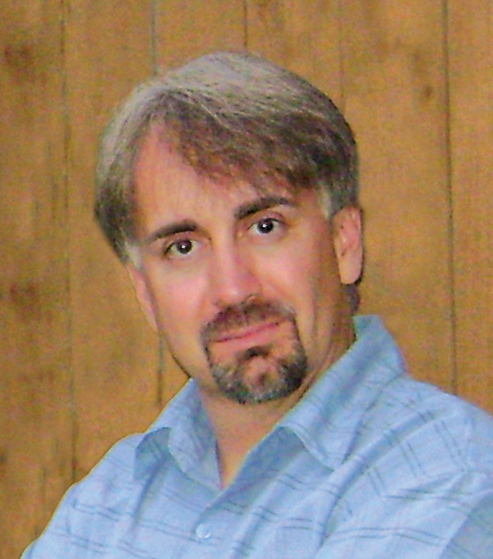
- Stan Romanek, 2009
- Born: December 1, 1962 (age 63); Fitzsimons Army Hospital, Aurora, Colorado, United States
- Occupations: Author and UFO proponent
- Spouse: Lisa Jeannette Romanek
- Website: Stan Romanek-Author

Stanley Tiger Romanek (born December 1, 1962) is an American author, documented con-artist and convicted sex offender.

Romanek’s first public claims began after a reported UFO sighting near Red Rocks Amphitheatre in Colorado in December 2000. Following these claims, he began filming videos of alleged UFOs and entities, which were shared within the UFO research community, including with organizations like MUFON. He gained major national attention when he appeared on Larry King Live on May 30, 2008, to promote his "Boo Video," which supposedly showed an alien peeking through a window. During this time, he also frequently appeared on the radio show Coast to Coast AM.

His book, Messages: The World's Most Documented Extraterrestrial Contact Story, was published in 2009, further cementing his name in paranormal circles. He was the subject of the documentary film Extraordinary: The Stan Romanek Story. His claims include: being abducted by aliens; being implanted with an alien artifact; having sustained mysterious injuries inflicted by aliens; having experienced telepathic communications with aliens; being dressed in women's clothing by aliens and to have fathered human-alien hybrid offspring. Romanek has been unable to corroborate any of his alien-related claims.

On August 8, 2017, Romanek was found guilty of felony possession of child pornography. On December 14, 2017, he was sentenced to serve two years in a community corrections facility. He is now a registered sex offender in the level 3 program for severe deniers. He is unable to use unmonitored computers or contact children under 18 without special approval. Romanek was resentenced on November 30, 2020, to 10 years of sex offender intensive supervised probation for violating the terms of his original sentence. Romanek was set to be resentenced on September 3, 2025, for additional sanction and possible additional incarceration after he was accused by prosecutors of violating the terms of his original sentence again.

== Background ==
Romanek claims to be an alien abductee. He says his first UFO encounter occurred in 2000, and that he has had many experiences with aliens since that time. These include allegedly discovering mysterious wounds on his body which glowed under a black light and claiming to having communication with aliens over a ghost box. He also claims aliens followed his car and visited his home, and that he experienced telepathic communication with them. In one account from 2003, he claims he woke up and found himself wearing ladies’ flannel underwear and suspected he had been abducted and returned in women’s clothing. Romanek says he eventually came to suspect that the clothing belonged to another supposed abductee, Betty Hill. When asked if the gown had been tested for Hill's DNA, Romanek claimed that it had not because the test was too expensive.

Appearing on ABC Primetime in 2009, Romanek made the unsubstantiated claims that he underwent hypnosis by R. Leo Sprinkle, a psychologist who specializes in alien abduction cases. Romanek claims that under hypnosis he wrote out the Drake equation, which is a formula used to estimate the number of communicative extraterrestrial civilizations in our galaxy, and then added "x100" to it. Joe Nickell, from the Center for Inquiry, suggested the equation was done through simple memorization.

== Controversies ==
=== Boo Video ===
In 2008, Romanek appeared on Larry King Live, along with Jeff Peckman, former Mayoral candidate, endorsing Romanek's story as part of his campaign for a Denver Extraterrestrial Affairs Commission. Romanek claimed to have recorded a video of an alien peeking in his window. This is now commonly referred to as the "Boo Video".

In May 2008, during an interview on Coast To Coast AM radio of Romanek, host George Noory suggested that Romanek take a lie detector test over the authenticity of the "Boo Video". Romanek agreed to this test. When it was conducted later that year, he failed on the question, "Is the Boo tape a hoax?" He alleged without evidence that he had medical conditions that prevent a lie detector test from working on him. Later at the 2009 Mysteries of the Universe conference in Kansas City, Romanek instead alleged, without evidence, that he was set up by Noory to fail.

Romanek made an unverified claim that he consulted a video expert, stating without evidence, that the Boo Video would have cost $50,000 to fake. A paranormal claims investigations group, Rocky Mountain Paranormal Research Society, debunked this claim, saying that they reproduced the video for about $90.

=== Missing implant ===
In 2009, in an interview on ABC Primetime, Romanek said he had physical evidence of his abduction experiences by way of an alien implant in his leg. When a medical test for the implant was requested, Romanek said it had disappeared.

=== Confession to paranormal hoax ===
In 2015, in a live video interview, Romanek was caught in the act of faking paranormal evidence—- throwing objects in the background at himself, failing to cover his hands and the device used to propel the objects —- and being “forced” to confess to the interviewer at a later date that he knowingly fabricated the alleged paranormal activity, though claiming his other alleged experiences were still true.

=== Child pornography ===
On February 13, 2014, Romanek was arrested after turning himself in at the Larimer County Jail on charges of possessing and distributing child pornography, the outcome of an eight-month investigation launched by the U.S. Department of Homeland Security. More than 300 images as well as video files depicting child pornography were found on Romanek's computers. After appearing at the Larimer County Courthouse, Romanek was released on a $20,000 personal recognizance bond. In March 2016, Romanek pleaded not guilty to both charges after refusing a plea deal from the 8th Judicial DA's Office.

On August 8, 2017, Romanek was found guilty of felony possession of child pornography but not guilty of distribution of child pornography. His sentencing was held December 14, 2017, where he was sentenced to serve two years in the Larimer County Community Corrections halfway house and to register as a sex offender. He reported immediately to jail to wait for space to become available at that facility. As a sex offender, he is now subject to 10 years of intensive supervised probation, not allowed to use computers or electronic devices unmonitored, and not allowed contact with children, under age 18, without approval from the community corrections program.

In February 2014, Romanek's wife Lisa said "We will be taking UFOlogy into the courtroom." After the trial, their defense attorneys, Colorado law firm McClintock and McClintock, stated that they did not do this because it was not relevant to the case. They advised Romanek to appeal the conviction and hire new defense counsel to handle the appeal case, which, according to Romanek's attorneys, is standard advice. Following the announcement of the verdict, Lisa Romanek said that they planned to file a notice of appeal within a 45-day period.

Romanek made public allegations that the government had planted the evidence on his computer. At the sentencing hearing, Deputy District Attorney Joshua Ritter accused him of deception "to try to place blame on others" and "doctoring evidence" in the form of videos falsely alleging that his computer had been hacked. Ritter disclosed that Romanek had even tried to frame his stepson Jacob Shadduck for placing the pornography on the computer; the prosecutor pointed out that even the defense team would not allow such fabricated evidence into court. In 2017, Romanek's attorney Ted McClintock stated that his client plans to appeal the conviction. To date, no appeal has been filed. The implementation of Romanek's mandatory sex offender program had been delayed several times and dragged out, with him making unverified claims that physical illness was keeping him from completely complying with the court orders.

After claims of illness caused him to miss several court dates during his original sentence, Romanek was resentenced on November 30, 2020, to ten more years of intense supervised probation. The judge expressed concern that Romanek was not taking responsibility for his crimes.

Romanek is set to be resentenced on January 21, 2026 after accused by prosecutors for violating the terms of his original sentence again.

== Documentary film ==
In 2013, J3FILMS produced the documentary Extraordinary: The Stan Romanek Story (105 minutes). Following Romanek's arrest in 2014, additional sequences were added to the end of the film disclosing Romanek's charges, as well as Romanek's claims of the government planting the material on his computer.

== See also ==
- Grey alien
