= Employee education benefits in the United States =

Educational assistance benefits are employee benefits that allow workers to participate in educational programs for free or at a reduced cost. These benefits are administered through education assistance programs. Education assistance programs are used by corporations to recruit, retain, and retrain employees and to increase goodwill with former employees and the public. They also serve as a corporate tax break.

Corporations with these programs include Walmart (Live Better U), Target Corporation, Amazon (Career Choice), McDonald's (Archways to Opportunity) and Kroger (Feed Your Future). The US Department of Defense also has a program called DOD Tuition Assistance that provides troops with funds for higher education and the US Department of Veterans Affairs has the Forever GI Bill for eligible servicemembers, veterans, and select family members. Some corporations employ private companies, such as Bright Horizons and Guild Education, to manage tuition payments to specific colleges and other education providers. According to Wharton College professor Peter Cappelli, a small percentage of workers use educational assistance benefits, but the programs "do reduce employee turnover and help businesses identify their most productive workers."

== History ==
US history has seen a rise and fall of benefits for working people. In 1875, the American Express Railroad Company established the first private pension plan in the United States. Other large businesses soon followed.

During the Great Depression, the US government's New Deal provided jobs and job skills training.

The post World War II GI Bill also provided opportunities for those who served. Following World War II employer health plans rose to 70 percent of all employers by the 1960s.

In the 1980s, US corporations began reducing training and other benefits for employees. The prevalence of employee education benefits programs was further reduced during the Great Recession, from 61 percent of companies surveyed in 2008 to 51 percent in 2018.

In 2021, a refound popularity among large employers has been met with skepticism. According to Peter Cappelli, director of Wharton’s Center for Human Resources, “They’re doing this because it sounds great and it’s cheap – almost no one can use them, they are all online/cut rate degree programs."

== Participation ==
Between one and ten percent of all employees typically use employee education benefits. Because many employees live paycheck to paycheck, and employers often reimburse workers instead of paying up front, about half of all money designated for these programs goes unused.

== Tax breaks ==
Employers may deduct all that they pay for the employee's educational costs as a business expense.

The US Internal Revenue Service allows workers to deduct $5,250 in employee education benefits from taxable income.

== Corporations ==
=== Amazon Career Choice ===
Amazon's Career Choice program pre-pays 95 percent of tuition for courses in high-demand fields. The corporation has said it will spend more than $700 million to upskill 100,000 of their U.S. employees for in-demand jobs such as aircraft mechanics, computer-aided design, machine tool technologies, medical lab technologies and nursing. At the time of its inception in 2012, critics called it a "PR stunt." By 2020, 25,000 associates from 14 countries had participated.

=== Department of Defense Tuition Assistance ===
DOD Tuition Assistance is a US Department of Defense (DOD) program that funds higher education programming for US military servicemembers. Currently, DOD TA funds servicemember's college tuition and fees, not to exceed $250 per semester credit hour or $166 per quarter credit hour and not to exceed $4,500 per fiscal year, Oct. 1 through Sept. 30. In 2019, DOD spent more than $492 million on the program that year and about 220,000 troops used the benefits.

=== Department of Veterans Affairs GI Bill ===
The GI Bill is the largest employee benefits program in the US. The program was originally for veterans of World War II. The latest iteration of the GI Bill is the Forever GI Bill.

=== FedEx LiFE ===
The FedEx program LiFE Inspired by FedEx (LiFE) is partnering with University of Memphis Global to offer educational benefits and boost employee retention.

=== Kroger Feed Your Future ===
As part of the company's employee growth effort, Kroger supports full-time and part-time workers in pursuing GEDs, MBAs or professional certifications

=== McDonalds Archways to Opportunity ===
McDonald's employees and the employees of participating independent franchises offer employee benefits to improve English language skills, earn a high school diploma, work toward a college degree, and get counseling about education and career plans. The corporation has spent more than $100 million on the program over the past four years. Independent franchises are charged for participating in the program. McDonalds' education partners are Colorado Technical University, Excelsior College, and DePaul University.

=== Starbucks College Achievement Plan ===
Starbucks has offered 100 percent tuition coverage discounts for Arizona State University since 2014. The goal of the program was to graduate 25,000 workers by 2025.By 2019, about 3000 employees had gotten degrees. According to the company "participants stay at Starbucks 50 percent longer and are promoted at three times the rate of U.S. retail employees who don't use the program."

=== Target Corporation's Debt-Free Education Assistance Program ===
In August 2021 Target Corporation said it was investing $200 million over the next four years, offering workers “'debt-free undergraduate degrees, certificates, certifications, free textbooks and more with no out-of-pocket costs' in 250 business-aligned programs from more than 40 schools, colleges and universities." The cost to Target is approximately $147 per worker per year.

=== Walmart Live Better U (LBU) ===
In 2021, Walmart reported that they would be offering education benefits to 1.6 million workers without any tuition payout by workers. Walmart claimed to be committing $1 billion over 5 years for this effort. According to Walmart, program participants are "two times more likely to get promoted, and they retain at a significantly higher rate." In 2020, according to Walmart, "about 15,000 of 950,000 eligible employees use the $1-a-day tuition benefit." In 2021, a Walmart official stated that 52,000 workers had participated and 8,000 had earned a degree or certificate. The Lumina Foundation reported that Walmart employee participation had increased to 30,000 active in the program. In three years the LBU program had the following results: 336 earned bachelor’s degrees, 50 earned associate degrees, and 1,805 earned certificates.

=== Waste Management's Your Tomorrow ===
Waste Management's "Your Tomorrow" program provides access to more than 170 fully-funded programs. In 2022, Your Tomorrow will include employees' children and spouses.

== Tuition discounts ==
Some corporations offer tuition discounts to their employees with schools they partner with.

== Intermediaries ==
=== Bright Horizons EdAssist Solutions ===
Bright Horizons provides workforce education (tuition discounts from about 220 schools) and student loan support for employees from several companies. Its clients include CVS Health, Home Depot, Children's Health, Bank of America, and Allstate Insurance.

=== Guild Education ===
Guild works for corporate clients, including Walmart, Target, Lowe's, Chipotle, Taco Bell, Disney and Discover Financial. Its education partners include Penn Foster High School, University of Arizona, Colorado State University online, Purdue University Global (formerly Kaplan University), University of Denver University College, Johnson and Wales University Online, Brandman University, Bellevue University, Oregon State e-university, Rio Salado College and Spelman College. According to Guild Education CEO Rachel Romer Carlson "the average worker who enrolls in education assistance is about 32, a woman of color and often a mom."

== See also ==
- DOD Tuition Assistance
- Edtech
- Employee benefits
