= 2011 Denver mayoral election =

- May 3 and June 7, 2011
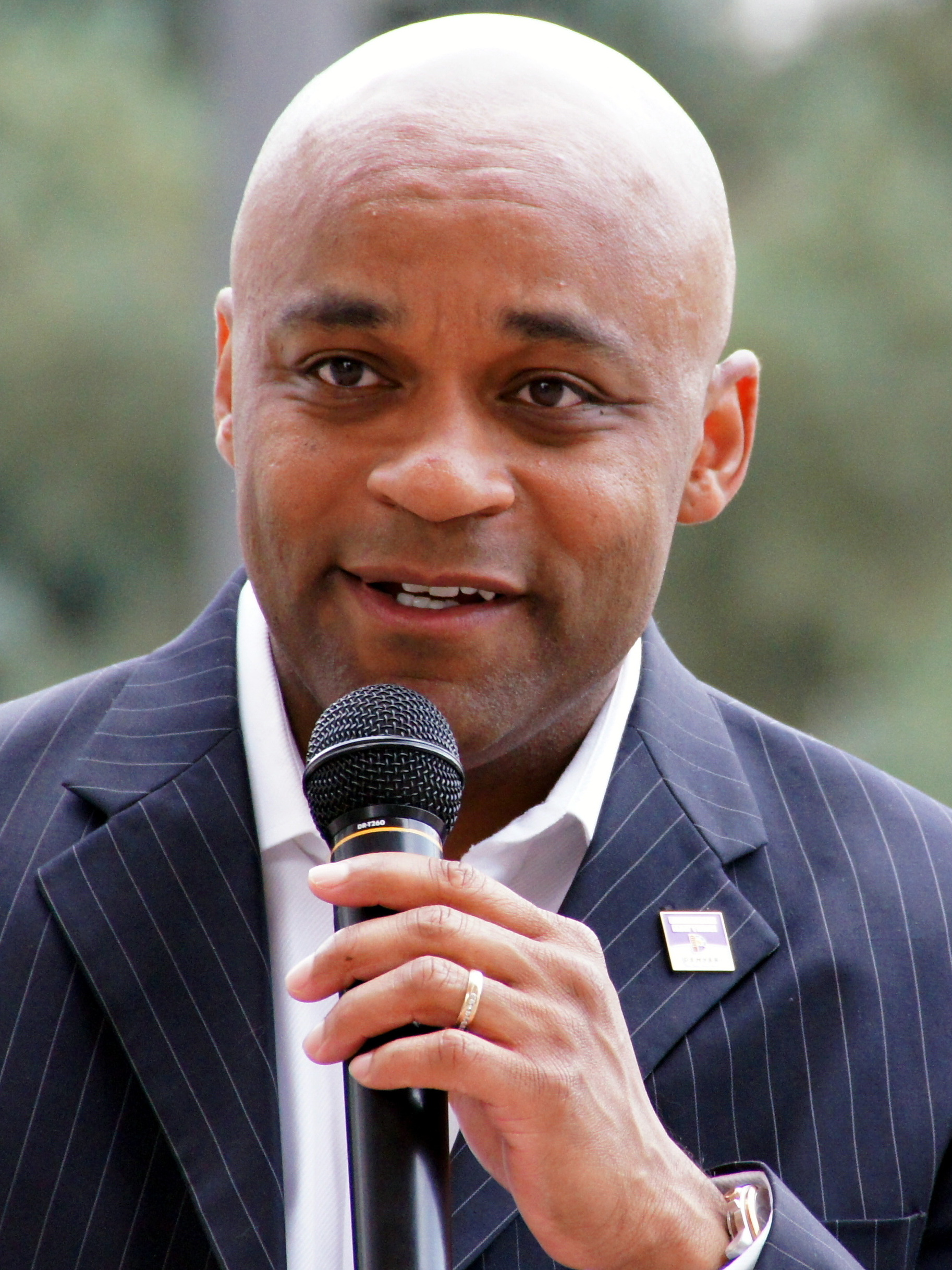

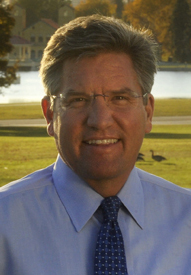

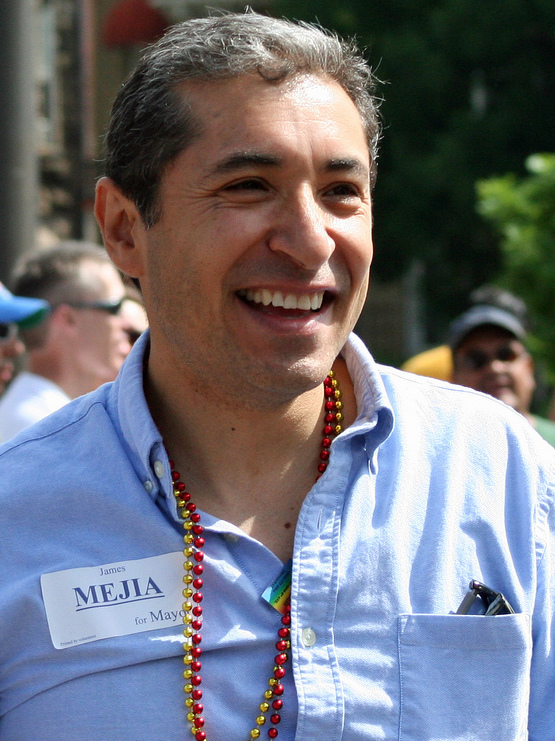

Nominee	Michael Hancock	Chris Romer
Party	Nonpartisan	Nonpartisan
First-round vote	30,811	32,170
First-round percentage	27.18%	28.38%
Second-round vote	70,780	51,082
Second-round percentage	58.08%	41.92%
Nominee	James Mejia	Doug Linkhart
Party	Nonpartisan	Nonpartisan
First-round vote	29,170	10,714
First-round percentage	25.73%	9.45%
Mayor before election
Bill Vidal
Democratic
Elected mayor
Michael Hancock.
Democratic

The 2011 Denver mayoral election took place on May 3 and June 7, 2011, to elect the Mayor of Denver. It led to a run-off election on June 7, 2011, which was won by Michael Hancock.

On January 12, 2011, Guillermo "Bill" Vidal was sworn in as Mayor of Denver, Colorado after John Hickenlooper resigned to be sworn in as the 42nd Governor of Colorado. Vidal was not a candidate in the election. Vidal served as mayor until July 2011. The preliminary election was held on May 3, 2011, and the general election was on June 7, 2011, between Senator Chris Romer and City Councilman Michael B. Hancock.

== Candidates ==
The major candidates were:

- Carol Boigon, at-large member of the Denver City Council
- Michael B. Hancock, District 11 member of the Denver City Council
- Doug Linkhart, at-large member of the Denver City Council
- Danny F. Lopez, Public Works employee and 2007 Mayoral candidate
- James Mejia, founding CEO of the Denver Preschool Program
- Chris Romer, Democratic state Senator
- Kenneth R. Simpson
- Theresa Spahn, former director of the University of Denver's Sandra Day O'Connor Judicial Selective Initiative
- Thomas Andrew Wolf, lawyer
- Jeff Peckman
- Marcus Giavanni, write-in candidate

== Polling ==
Poll source	Date(s) administered	Sample size	Margin of error	Michael Hancock (D)	Chris Romer (D)	Other	Undecided
Survey USA	May 23–27, 2011	548	± 4.3%	49%	39%	—	11%

== Results ==
Candidates	Primary Election		General Election	
	Votes	%	Votes	%
Michael B. Hancock	30,811	27.18	70,780	58
Chris Romer	32,170	28.38	51,082	42
James Mejia	29,170	25.73		
Doug Linkhart	10,714	9.45		
Theresa Spahn	3,373	2.98		
Carol Boigon	2,357	2.08		
Thomas Andrew Wolf	2,139	1.89		
Danny F. Lopez	1,036	0.91		
Jeff Peckman	796	0.7		
Kenneth R. Simpson	526	0.46		
Write-In	275	0.24		
Total	113,367	100	121,862	100
