= Earl Mann =

American politician (1886–1969)

Earl W. Mann (June 8, 1886 – 1969) was a state legislator and columnist in Colorado in the United States. The Denver Public Library has a collection of his papers.

He was born in Lyons, Iowa. He served in the U.S. Army during World War I and was badly injured by poison gas. He was treated at Fitzsimmons Army Hospital in Denver, Colorado. He was first elected to the Colorado House of Representatives in 1942 and served five consecutive terms. He was a Republican.

He wrote newspaper columns. His columns expressed opposition to lynching and disbelief that legislation to make it a federal crime failed. He also wrote in opposition to the Alien Land Act. His February 19, 1944 column stated the act was "fascism appearing in a new suit of clothes, without bathing, permitting the noxious body odors to disclose its identity, and its subtle purpose: Japanese and then Negroes and Jews."

His name was recorded as Edward W. Mann. He was inducted into the Colorado Black Hall of Fame.

He served in the Colorado House of Representatives from 1943-49 and 1951-54.
