= Donato LaRossa =

American surgeon (1941–2014)

Donato D. LaRossa (1941–2014) was a medical doctor and professor emeritus of Surgery at the University of Pennsylvania School of Medicine.

== Career ==
LaRossa was born in New Jersey in 1941. He received his A.B. from Seton Hall University in 1963 and his M.D. from Georgetown University School of Medicine in 1967. LaRossa served in the United States Army for two years as the Assistant Chief of Plastic and Reconstructive Surgery at the Fitzsimons Army Medical Center in Denver, Colorado where he was promoted to the rank of Major. He was also an instructor at the University of Colorado at Boulder.

He began his career at University of Pennsylvania in 1976 when he was appointed assistant professor of surgery.

LaRossa died on January 21, 2014, in Malvern, Pennsylvania.
