= Jeff Peckman =

American activist (born 1954)

Jeff Peckman (born 1954) is an American UFO disclosure activist. He lives in Denver, Colorado, and describes himself as an entrepreneur and consultant. He is also a practitioner and teacher of Transcendental Meditation.

== Early life and education ==
Peckman attended Maharishi International University in Iowa for one year.

== Political career ==
In 1998, Peckman ran for the United States Senate as a member of the Natural Law Party receiving 0.31% of the votes, and coming in fifth in a field of seven.

In 2003, Peckman got an initiative on the ballot in Denver which said "Shall the voters for the city and county of Denver adopt an initiative ordinance to require the city to help ensure public safety by increasing peacefulness?" The initiative failed to gain enough votes to pass.

Since 2008, Peckman has attempted to create an Extraterrestrial Affairs Commission within the Denver city government, to prepare for visits from extraterrestrials. Peckman gathered 4000 signatures to place his proposal for the seven-member commission on the November 2008 general-election ballot in Denver. However, he declined to file the paperwork for the November 2008 election, in the hope that an incoming Obama administration would release material on extraterrestrials to the public.

In 2009, the initiative received over 7000 signatures for the 2010 ballot. After validation by the Denver Elections Division, it was determined that the number of valid signatures was insufficient leaving 1000 valid signatures still required. This insufficiency was resolved by the end of November 2009, and Initiative 300 was put on Denver's November 2010 election ballot. The initiative was opposed by a group calling itself M.I.B. In the election, initiative 300 was rejected by 82.34% of Denver voters.

After this defeat, Peckman filed a complaint with the Denver Board of Ethics, where he questioned the "unethical, incompetent, and suspicious behavior" of Denver officials, who he claimed assisted other "very disreputable, incompetent, unethical, and hostile persons" during the campaign, and further ponders whether these were acting in conjunction with the CIA, NSA, or other covert groups. The Denver ethics board dismissed this complaint "for lack of jurisdiction, and because the complaint did not deal with any issues that are covered by the Denver Code of Ethics".

Peckman appeared on the May 3, 2011, Denver mayoral ballot in a field of 10 other candidates, though one had dropped out before the election. Out of over 110,000 votes cast, Peckman received only 796 votes, coming in second to last place.

In 2026, Peckman appeared on the Colorado gubernatorial ballot. In a field of 8 other candidates for governor, he came in last place.

== New Age claims ==
=== Metatron technology ===
He promotes Metatron technology, which he says defends against "harmful electromagnetic waves" by transforming them into "desirable healthy energy".

=== Extraterrestrials ===
Peckman is an advocate for disclosure of UFO and extraterrestrial phenomena who gained media attention in 2008 when he publicly displayed a video of a purported extraterrestrial in Denver, Colorado.

Peckman publicly screened the video on May 30, 2008, at Metropolitan State College in Denver and forbid photos by reporters. The three-minute video contained images of a "white creature with a balloon-shaped head" and large dark eyes that blinked and looked through a window said to be 8 feet above the ground.

The video was said to have been made by Stan Romanek, July 17, 2003, in Nebraska. A documentary including the footage was scheduled for release in 2008 but was delayed. Area skeptics used a rented alien costume and video editing software to produce a hoax version of the video that reproduced many of the movements, although experts who viewed the Romanek video assert there was no post-production editing of that video.

=== Rain music ===
In the summer of 2012, wildfires burning in the mountains of Colorado became the most destructive in the state's history. By the middle of June, the fires had destroyed over 180 homes and taken one life. Peckman's solution was to propose that certain music "replicates the frequencies present in nature when it rains", and that playing such music was historically proven to increase the chance of rain. He suggested local radio and broadcast stations, government frequencies, and people in the path of the fire, play this music. In the days after his proposal the fires worsened, bringing the destruction to at least 651 and taking six lives.
