= Rachel Romer =

American businesswoman (born 1988)

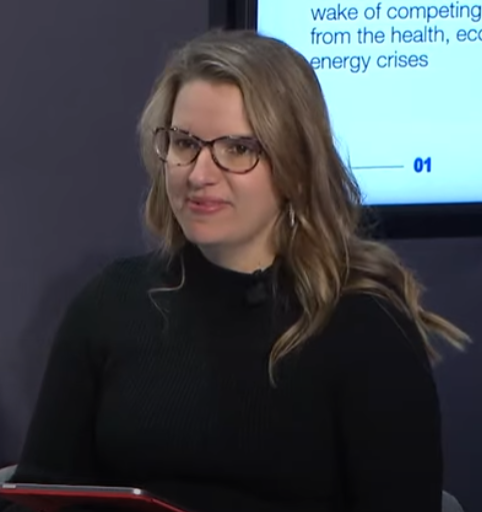
- Speaking at the 2023 World Economic Forum
- Born: 1988 (age 37–38)
- Education: Stanford University
- Known for: Co-founder of Guild Education
- Spouse: David Carlson (m. 2014; div. 2023)
- Children: 2
- Parent(s): Chris Romer, Laurie Romer

Rachel Romer (born 1988) is the co-founder and former CEO of Guild, a company that assists employers by managing their education assistance benefits.

== Early life and education ==
Rachel Romer is the daughter of former Colorado State Senator and charter school investor Chris Romer, and a granddaughter of former Colorado Governor Roy Romer. Governor Romer was instrumental in the formation and growth of Western Governors University. As a child, she sometimes attended and participated in her grandfather's campaign, and in 2011 worked as the finance director for her father's unsuccessful mayoral campaign.

She completed an undergraduate degree, and also an MBA and an MA in education at Stanford University. While at Stanford, she took a break to work for the Obama administration. She also worked with her father on issues related to access to higher education.

== Career ==
After graduation, Romer worked for American Honors, an organization co-founded by her father that coaches community college students, and EY-Parthenon, as well as the Obama campaign and the Office of Presidential Personnel in the Obama administration. She was the chief executive of Student Blueprint, an app she created while at Stanford during her MBA program to help community college students find jobs. Romer sold the app in 2014.

In 2015, at the age of 27, Romer co-founded Guild Education with her former classmate Brittany Stich, after she conducted research for two years with Stich into low graduation rates, In 2019, the organization became valued at over $1 billion. In 2020, it was listed as a CNBC Top 50 disruptor.

In March 2020, Romer co-authored an open letter, signed by more than 450 other CEOs and investors, advocating for business leaders to mitigate the COVID-19 pandemic. She is a co-founder and strategic advisor for the organization Stop The Spread.

In June 2021 Guild Education was valued at $3.7 billion. Romer's personal wealth was estimated to be $570 million in 2022. In 2023, Forbes estimated her net worth to be $320 million.

After suffering a stroke in 2023, Romer stepped down from her role as CEO of Guild Education, and was succeeded by Bijal Shah.

== Recognition ==
In 2017, Romer appeared on the Forbes 30 Under 30 list, under the category of education. She would later be named the 2020 EY Entrepreneur of the Year for the Mountain Desert region. In 2021, Romer appeared on Forbes' list of self-made women.

== Personal life ==
In 2014, Rachel Romer married David Carlson. She has 2 daughters. In 2023, she divorced and suffered a stroke, resulting in her being placed under a medically induced coma, from which she awoke in 2024.

== See also ==
- Employee education benefits in the United States
- For-profit higher education in the United States
