= Pat Pascoe =

American politician

Member of the Colorado Senate from the 32nd district
- In office January 11, 1995 – January 8, 2003
- Preceded by: Ray Peterson
- Succeeded by: Dan Grossman

Member of the Colorado Senate from the 34th district
- In office January 11, 1989 – January 13, 1993
- Preceded by: Paul Powers
- Succeeded by: Dennis Gallagher

Personal details
- Party: Democratic

Pat Pascoe is an American politician who served in the Colorado Senate from the 34th district from 1989 to 1993 and from the 32nd district from 1995 to 2003.
