= Donna R. Johnson =

American politician (born c.1934)

Donna Johnson

Member of the Colorado Senate from the 32nd district
- In office December 28, 2006 – January 10, 2007
- Preceded by: Dan Grossman
- Succeeded by: Chris Romer

Personal details
- Born: c. 1933 (age 92–93)
- Party: Democratic

Donna R. Johnson (born c. 1934) is a former legislator and legislative aide in the U.S. state of Colorado. A long-time legislative assistant to Sen. Dan Grossman, Johnson was appointed to the Colorado State Senate by Gov. Bill Owens in 2006 to serve for the final weeks of Grossman's term following his early resignation.

Donna Johnson is chairwoman for the political action committee "Making Colorado Great".

== Legislative appointment ==
Johnson retired from a career in Jefferson County schools, and was president of the Jefferson County Education Association - Retired. Johnson served as a legislative assistant to Sen. Dan Grossman for seven years.

Grossman, who was term-limited following the November 2006 legislative elections, resigned from the legislature on December 1, before the expiration of his term, because of new ethics laws which would prevent him from lobbying the legislature for a period of two years.

Under Colorado state law, a Democratic Party vacancy committee was authorized to appoint a replacement to fill the seat for the remainder of Grossman's term. The vacancy committee did not achieve a quorum, however, leaving the seat to be filled by outgoing Republican Governor Bill Owens.

On December 15, 2006, Owens appointed Johnson to the vacant seat; the interim appointment was supported by Chris Romer, who had been elected to the seat in the November 2006 election. She was sworn in at the Colorado State Senate chambers on December 28, 2006 at 9 a.m. by Colorado Supreme Court justice Gregory Hobbs. Her term as a state senator expired when the following session of the General Assembly opened on January 10, 2007, and Romer was sworn into the Senate seat.

Johnson represented Senate District 32, which encompasses southern Denver. The legislature took no official actions during her brief tenure in the State Senate; Johnson would have been eligible to vote as a Senator had a special session been called during her term.
