= Project Canary =

- Type: Private (Public-benefit corporation)
- Industry: Environmental technology, SaaS, Emissions monitoring
- Founded: 2019
- Founder: William Foiles, Chris Romer, Anna Scott
- Headquarters: Denver, Colorado, United States
- Key people: William Foiles (co-founder); Chris Romer (co-founder)
- Products: Continuous methane monitoring hardware and software; emissions analytics platform
- Subsidiaries: Aeris Technologies
- Website: projectcanary.com

Project Canary is a privately held environmental technology company based in Denver, Colorado. The company develops continuous methane monitoring hardware and a software platform that is used for measuring, quantifying and reporting greenhouse gas emissions from oil and gas production, midstream pipelines, natural gas utilities and other industrial facilities.

The company's products combine fixed laser-based point sensors with a hardware-agnostic analytics platform, which also ingests data from third-party sensors, aerial surveys, satellites and operational systems.

Its wholly-owned subsidiary Aeris Technologies is a California-based manufacturer of laser-absorption gas analyzers, acquired by Project Canary in 2022.

== History ==
Project Canary was founded in 2019 in Denver by William Foiles and Chris Romer. Initial focus of the company was on continuous methane emissions monitoring for oil and gas operators.

In August 2020 the company merged with Independent Energy Standards, an environmental assessment firm. After the merger Project Canary's services were expanded to include site-level emissions ratings.

A month later, in September 2020, Project Canary was chosen for the first class of the Techstars Alabama EnergyTech Accelerator — a program run together with Alabama Power that is focused on energy technology startups.

In April 2021 the company closed a $10 million Series A round, which was led by Quantum Energy Partners, Global Reserve Group and Energy Impact Partners.

In February 2022 a Series B round of $111 million was raised, bringing total disclosed funding to $121 million. The round was led by Insight Partners with participation of Brookfield Growth, Canada Pension Plan Investment Board and others. Insight Partners has also received a board seat as part of the deal.

The next month the company acquired Aeris Technologies, manufacturer of laser-based gas analyzers and leak detection systems from Hayward, California. The acquisition expanded Project Canary's capabilities — the company became able to detect additional greenhouse gases such as ethane, nitrous oxide, formaldehyde, ethylene oxide and benzene.

During 2023 Project Canary moved from hardware-centric model to a hardware-agnostic software platform, which integrates emissions data from ground-based sensors, aerial surveys, satellite measurements and other operational systems.

In February 2024 the company and Colorado State University's Methane Emissions Technology Evaluation Center (METEC) announced a partnership for validation of Project Canary's forward dispersion simulator — a modeling tool used to improve accuracy of emissions source attribution.

Later in the same year, in June 2024, the company launched Canary Carbon Portal — an emissions accounting software designed to help energy companies manage enterprise-level greenhouse gas data and reporting. At the same time a partnership with reservoir-engineering software company Tachyus was also announced, to integrate emissions forecasting and regulatory reporting workflows.

In April 2025 the U.S. Environmental Protection Agency issued a formal approval letter, accepting Project Canary's Canary X continuous methane monitoring system as an Alternative Test Method (MATM-010) for fugitive emissions screening under the New Source Performance Standards.

Also in April, three technology integrations into the analytics platform were disclosed: a partnership with UK's QLM Technology to add quantum-lidar methane cameras, a partnership with New Zealand-based Aeroqual for integration of the AQS1 air-quality sensor, and a partnership with Sniffer Robotics — an EPA-approved drone surface-emissions monitoring vendor — focused on landfill methane quantification.

In September Project Canary reported growing adoption of its operational intelligence platform among U.S. energy companies and also announced plans to start international pilot programs later in the year.

In November 2025 three peer-reviewed studies were published by the company in scientific journals, examining methane detection and quantification at more than 120 oil and gas sites. One of these studies, done together with collaborators from Colorado State University, reported methane measurement error rates of less than 4% over a 28-day testing period.

In February 2026 the company released an analysis of about 24.7 million 15-minute emission rate estimates, collected from 940 upstream production sites across seven U.S. basins. The analysis found that short-duration intermittent events contribute a disproportionately large share of total measured methane emissions.

== Operations ==
Project Canary runs a software-as-a-service platform which aggregates emissions data from several measurement technologies — fixed continuous monitoring systems, aerial surveys, satellite imagery, and handheld and mobile detection equipment — into one unified system for operational decision-making and regulatory reporting.

Among the reported product lines are the Canary X continuous methane monitoring system, the Canary Carbon Portal (enterprise emissions accounting application), and also Canary RECON and Canary PICO — respectively a vehicle-mounted mobile detection system and a handheld investigation instrument.

According to company disclosures and industry coverage, the platform is designed to support compliance with U.S. EPA Subpart W and Subparts OOOOb/c, the United Nations Environment Programme OGMP 2.0 framework, and U.S. Pipeline and Hazardous Materials Safety Administration pipeline safety regulations.
