= DOD Tuition Assistance =

DOD Tuition Assistance is a US Department of Defense (DOD) program that fund higher education programming for US military servicemembers who wish to attend college before their service obligation ends. Currently, DOD TA funds servicemember's college tuition and fees, not to exceed $250 per semester credit hour or $166 per quarter credit hour and not to exceed $4,500 per fiscal year, Oct. 1 through Sept. 30. In 2019, DOD spent more than $492 million on the program that year and about 220,000 troops used the benefits.

== History ==
The US military has employed civilian institutions for its troops since at least World War I. According to the US Department of Veterans Affairs, DOD Tuition Assistance began in the 1950s as a way to provide education benefits to active duty personnel. In the 1990s, DOD Tuition Assistance was excluded from requirements that schools receive funding outside of government funds. This loophole made servicemembers more vulnerable to for-profit colleges that were aggressively marketing students.

During the Obama administration, the Government Accountability Office (GAO) found problems with the DOD Tuition Assistance program and reforms were imposed. In 2011, the GAO published a report calling for greater oversight of the DOD TA program. While DOD has instituted an oversight system, it has rarely sanctioned schools for violations of the MOU. In 2012, President Obama issued Executive Order 13607 instructing the Department of Education, Department of Defense, and Department of Veterans Affairs to develop "Principles of Excellence to strengthen oversight, enforcement, and accountability" within the Post-9/11 GI Bill and the Tuition Assistance Program. At its peak in fiscal year 2013, DOD spent $540 million on the program. In that year, 571 advisors provided educational support to nearly 280,000 service members. In 2014, DOD created the DoD Postsecondary Education Complaint System (PECS). GAO also again found that DOD was lacking in its administration of the program. In 2015, after an expose by the Center for Investigative Reporting, DOD began removing the University of Phoenix from military installations for the school's aggressive marketing.

From 2014 to 2018, the number of servicemembers using the program fell by 14.5 percent. In 2018 the number of service members using tuition assistance fell another 2.5 percent. According to the Military Times "For-profit schools accounted for 34.7 percent of TA usage in fiscal 2018, compared with 39.7 percent for public schools and 25.7 percent for private nonprofit schools. For-profits are even more dominant among the top 50 TA schools, accounting for 39.3 percent of the student enrollment, more than public and private institutions."

Under the Trump administration, regulations were eased even though schools continued to be out of compliance. In 2018, the Department of Defense reported that all member schools that reported had at least one violation of the MOU. One school had 17 infractions. In 2019, there appeared to be little progress in institutional compliance. However, DOD did not sanction any schools for violations of the MOU. DOD removed the rule requiring a delay in the use of TA funds following advanced individual training (AIT) or officer basic officer course (OBC). The US Army also waived the rule requiring troops using TA funds for a bachelor's degree to wait 10 years before using the benefit for a master's degree.

In 2021, Congress closed the 90–10 loophole, and DOD Tuition Assistance would no longer excluded from the 90–10 formula, beginning in 2023. A Task & Purpose article detailed problems with the US Army's DOD Tuition Assistance program as the organization converted to a new platform: from GoArmyEd to ArmyIgnitED.

== Benefits ==
DOD TA funds college tuition and certain fees, not to exceed $250 per semester credit hour or $166 per quarter credit hour and not to exceed $4,500 per fiscal year, Oct. 1 through Sept. This can be combined with Tuition Assistance Top Up. Allowing servicemembers to utilize their GI Bill while on active duty and extend the reach of Tuition Assistance. 30

== Administration ==
DOD Tuition Assistance is administered by Defense Voluntary Education Programs. The Under Secretary of Defense for Personnel and Readiness (USD) provides overall policy guidelines. The responsibilities are accomplished through the Deputy Assistant Secretary of Defense for Military Community and Family Policy and the Chief of Continuing Education in the Educational Opportunities Directorate.

=== Education advisors and installation education centers ===
Career and education counselors at installation education centers provide assistance to service members pursuing civilian higher education. Services include counseling, financial aid, and testing programs. Education counselors also assist service members who need to request tuition assistance. These installations also have classroom space. The majority of service members, however, enroll in online classes.

=== DOD MOU ===
The Memorandum of Understanding (MOU) is a document, signed by school officials, that requires schools to be transparent with servicemembers, and bans aggressive marketing and inducements to encourage servicemembers from enrolling in their school. Schools receiving DOD Tuition Assistance are required to sign the MOU periodically.

=== TA DECIDE ===
TA DECIDE is the official online information and comparison tool for military members.

=== DOD oversight ===
Guidehouse LLP is the contractor for the DoD VolEd Institutional Compliance Program (ICP) project. ICP reports are presented at the Council of College Military Educators (CCME) conference.

==== Postsecondary Education Complaint System (PECS) ====
The Postsecondary Education Complaint System (PECS) allows servicemembers, spouses, and other family members to file complaints against a school. DOD is required to track, manage, and provide responses to the complaints. In 2015, the last year of reporting, the schools that received the most complaints were University of Phoenix (12), Colorado Technical University (7), and Kaplan University online (7).

== Participating schools ==
More than 3,000 schools are eligible to receive DOD TA, but a small number receive the bulk of the funds. The schools or corporations that receive the most DOD TA funding are:

- American Public Education
- University System of Maryland
- Zovio (servicer of University of Arizona Global Campus)
- Embry-Riddle
- Central Texas College
- Columbia Southern Education Group
- Trustees of Purdue University
- Liberty University
- Excelsior College
- Park University
- Southern New Hampshire University
- Trident University
- Columbia College
- Arizona Board of Regents
- Saint Leo University

== Top Up program ==
The Top-Up program allows servicemembers to use the GI Bill to supplement the tuition and fees not covered by tuition assistance. Funds received from this program will count against GI Bill benefits later on.

== See also ==
- 90-10 rule
- Defense Activity for Non-Traditional Education Support (DANTES)
- GI Bill
- US Department of Defense
