= Earth System Grid =

The Earth System Grid (ESG) is a data distribution portal whose development is funded mainly by the United States Department of Energy. It is the portal through which the Program for Climate Model Diagnosis and Intercomparison at Lawrence Livermore National Laboratory is distributing data for the IPCC Fourth Assessment Report and the 2014 IPCC Fifth Assessment Report.
