= Guild Education =

American education services company

Guild
- Formerly: Guild Education
- Company type: Private
- Industry: Continuing education
- Founded: June 2015; 11 years ago
- Founders: Rachel Romer and Brittany Stich
- Headquarters: Denver, Colorado
- Key people: Bijal Shah (CEO)
- Number of employees: ~900 (2026)
- Website: www.guildeducation.com

Guild, formerly known as Guild Education, is a private company headquartered in Denver, Colorado that is employed by Fortune 1000 companies to manage their education assistance benefits. Guild facilitates direct payment for courses to education provider clients and offers marketing services.

== History ==
Guild Education was founded in June 2015 by Rachel Romer and Brittany Stich. The company advises large corporations and contracts with adult education providers. It offers marketing services and receives payment from schools only when students enroll. The employers also receive a tax break.

In June 2021, Guild Education announced a strategic partnership with 2U, where the latter company made its degree programs, courses, and bootcamp programs available to the corporations that employ Guild. Google also made Google Career Certificates available to corporations that employ Guild. In the same month, CNBC reported that Guild Education sought to profit from its expectation of automation increasing displacement of workers.

In June 2022, Forbes and Bloomberg reported Guild's valuation at $4.4 billion. That same year, Guild Education reduced its office space in Denver by 50 percent.

In April 2023, Guild Education rebranded as Guild, and according to Fortune, added "a new career coaching product." In May 2023, Guild reduced its staff by 12%, resulting in over 150 individuals being laid off after several rounds of restructuring. In October 2023, Guild announced that it was offering training in artificial intelligence for front line workers through its education provider clients.

In April 2024, Bijal Shah was named CEO. In May 2024, Guild laid off an additional quarter of its workforce, an estimated 300 workers. In October 2024, Guild announced its acquisition of Nomadic Learning.

In January 2025, Macy's ended its partnership with Guild Education, after working with the company to provide college degree programs and other educational courses to its employees at no cost.

In April 2025, Spectrum partnered with Guild to offer online courses.

In January 2026, Guild began offering incentives for employees to return to work in office. Of the approximately 900 employees hired by Guild, around 40% of them are based in Denver.

== Reception ==
In 2018, The Century Foundation contributor Kelia Washington wrote about employer-offered educational programs, including those offered through Guild, stating "at best, these programs are limited in their ability to meaningfully increase college access and completion, and, at worst, they can create additional barriers for employees seeking to obtain high-quality, meaningful credentials."

== See also ==
- For-profit higher education in the United States
- Online education
- Student loans
