= Dan Grossman =

American politician

Dan Grossman is an attorney and a former member of the Colorado General Assembly. Grossman was first elected to the Colorado House of Representatives as a Democrat in 1996. He defeated Democrat Chuck Michaels in the Democratic primary election and Republican Ron Kipp in the general election. Grossman represented House District 6 in East/Central Denver. After winning a second term, Grossman was elected by his House Democratic colleagues to serve as Minority Caucus Chairman. He also served as the ranking Democrat on the House Judiciary Committee. After the 2000 election, Grossman became the youngest person in Colorado history to serve as Minority Leader.

In 2002, Grossman was elected to the Colorado Senate, representing District 32. Grossman succeeded Senator Pat Pascoe who could not seek re-election because of term limits. In the Senate, Grossman served as chairman of the Judiciary Committee, chairman of the Joint Committee on Legal Services and vice-chairman of the Agriculture, Natural Resources and Energy Committee. He also served as chairman of the Select Committee on Homeland Security.

After serving one term in the Senate and considering and declining a run for attorney general after the birth of his second child, Grossman chose not to seek re-election.
