= 2011 United States elections =

- ← 2009 2010 2011 2012 2013 → Off-year elections
- Election day: November 8

Congressional special elections
- Seats contested: 4
- Net seat change: 0
- 2011 congressional special election results map Democratic hold Republican hold Democratic gain Republican gain

Gubernatorial elections
- Seats contested: 4
- Net seat change: 0
- 2011 gubernatorial election results map Democratic hold Republican hold

Elections were held in the United States on (for the most part) November 8. This was an off-year election, in which the only seats up for election in the United States Congress were special elections. There were also four gubernatorial races, including a special election in West Virginia. There were also state legislative elections in four states and judicial elections in three states; as well as numerous citizen initiatives, mayoral races, and a variety of other local offices on the ballot.

== Federal elections ==
=== Congressional elections ===
No regularly scheduled elections for the United States Congress occurred in 2011, and instead only four special elections were held. Eventually, there was no net seat changes by the political parties.

- California's 36th district: Democrat Jane Harman resigned from office. Democrat Janice Hahn was elected on July 12 to replace Harman.
- Nevada's 2nd district: Republican Representative Dean Heller was appointed to replace John Ensign after the latter resigned from his seat in the U.S. Senate. Republican Mark Amodei was elected on September 13 to replace Heller.
- New York's 26th district: Republican Chris Lee resigned from office. Democrat Kathy Hochul was elected on May 24 to replace Lee.
- New York's 9th district: Democrat Anthony Weiner resigned from office. Republican Bob Turner was elected on September 13 to replace Weiner.

In addition, a primary election was held in Oregon's 1st congressional district on November 8, for the seat left open after the resignation of David Wu; the special election for this seat then occurred on January 31, 2012. Democrat Suzanne Bonamici was elected on that date to replace Wu.

== State elections ==
=== Gubernatorial elections ===
There were three regularly scheduled elections and one special election for governorships in 2011. None of these four changed party hands.

- Kentucky: Incumbent Democratic Governor Steve Beshear was re-elected.
- Louisiana: Incumbent Republican Governor Bobby Jindal was re-elected on October 22, when all candidates competed in an open jungle primary.
- Mississippi: Incumbent Republican Governor Haley Barbour was term limited out of office. Republican Phil Bryant was elected to succeed him.
- West Virginia: A special election was held on October 4, following the resignation of Democrat Joe Manchin, who was elected to the U.S. Senate in 2010. Democrat Earl Ray Tomblin, President of the West Virginia Senate and Acting Governor, was elected to replace Manchin.

=== Other statewide elections ===
In the first three of the aforementioned states, elections for state executive branch offices of Lieutenant Governor (in a separate election in Louisiana and Mississippi and on the same ticket as the gubernatorial nominee in Kentucky), Secretary of state, state Treasurer, state Auditor, state Attorney General, and Commissioners of Insurance and Agriculture were held. In addition, there were elections for Kentucky and Mississippi's state appellate courts, respectively.

=== State and territorial legislative elections ===
Four states – Louisiana, Mississippi, New Jersey and Virginia – and one U.S. territory, the Northern Mariana Islands, elected their state or territorial legislators in 2011.

These were the first elections to be affected by redistricting after the 2010 census. Additionally, the first wave of recall elections occurred in the Wisconsin Senate; while Republicans lost seats, they maintained a narrow majority. A second wave would occur in 2012.

Republicans flipped control of the Virginia Senate, thereby establishing a trifecta. In Mississippi, Republicans won the state House for the first time since 1876. After having gained control of the Mississippi Senate in February 2011 in the year due to party switching, Republicans retained control of the chamber in the November election. Republicans thus obtained a trifecta in the state for the first time since 1876 as a result.

In Louisiana, Republicans gained control of the State House in December 2010 when a state representative switched parties, and control of the State Senate by winning a February 2011 special election. Republicans maintained control of both chambers in November, thereby giving Republicans control of Senate for the first time since 1877, and the state house and a trifecta for the first time since 1873.

=== Initiatives and referendums ===
Nine states, Arkansas, Colorado, Louisiana, Maine, Mississippi, New Jersey, Ohio, Texas, and Washington state, had measures certified for the 2011 ballot. Among those that attracted the most attention were an Ohio referendum that repealed legislation that limits collective bargaining for public employees, and a failed constitutional amendment in Mississippi that would have defined "personhood" as beginning at the fertilization of an embryo.

=== Judicial elections ===
Four states, Louisiana, New York, Pennsylvania and Wisconsin, had judicial elections in 2011. Additional states such as Arizona, Nevada and Ohio had municipal judicial elections in 2011.

== Municipal elections ==
Nationwide, various cities, counties, school boards, special districts and others elected officers in 2011. Some were held on November 8 while others were held at other times throughout the year.

Some of the high-profile mayoral elections included the following:

- Baltimore: Sheila Dixon resigned in 2010. Stephanie Rawlings-Blake is serving as Baltimore's interim mayor until a replacement is elected.
- Charlotte: Incumbent Anthony Foxx was re-elected to a second term.
- Chicago: Richard M. Daley declined to run for a seventh term. Rahm Emanuel was elected on February 22 as Daley's successor.
- Dallas: Tom Leppert resigned on February 25, 2011 in order to run for U.S. Senate in 2012. Dwaine Caraway served as Dallas' interim mayor until Mike Rawlings was elected in a runoff on June 18.
- Denver: John Hickenlooper resigned after he took office as Governor of Colorado in January 2011. Bill Vidal served as Denver's interim mayor until Michael Hancock was elected in a runoff on June 7.
- Fort Worth: Incumbent Mike Moncrief declined to run for another term. Betsy Price was elected as the successor.
- Greensboro: Incumbent Bill Knight was unseated by Robbie Perkins.
- Indianapolis: Incumbent Greg Ballard was re-elected.
- Jacksonville: John Peyton was term-limited out of office. Alvin Brown was elected in a runoff on May 17.
- Las Vegas: Oscar Goodman was term-limited out of office. His wife, Carolyn Goodman, was elected to succeed him.
- Phoenix: Incumbent Phil Gordon was term-limited out of office. Greg Stanton was elected in a runoff.
- Portland, Maine: This was the first race since a citywide 2010 referendum recreated the elected mayor position, which had previously been removed in 1923. Former Maine state senator Michael F. Brennan was selected by Portland voters, defeating 14 other candidates.
- Raleigh: Incumbent Charles Meeker declined to run for another term. Nancy McFarlane was elected to succeed him.
- San Francisco: Gavin Newsom resigned after he took office as Lieutenant Governor of California in January 2011. Edwin M. Lee served as San Francisco's interim mayor, then was elected to a full term in his own right.
- Tampa: Incumbent Pam Iorio was term-limited out of office. Bob Buckhorn was elected in a runoff on March 22.
- Tucson: Incumbent Bob Walkup declined to run for another term. Democrat Jonathan Rothschild was elected as his successor.

== Tables of partisan control results ==
These tables show the partisan results of the Congressional special elections and gubernatorial races in 2011. Bold indicates a change in control.

House Congressional seats
Seat	Before 2011 elections	After 2011 elections
California 36th	Democratic	Democratic
Nevada 2nd	Republican	Republican
New York 9th	Democratic	**Republican**
New York 26th	Republican	**Democratic**

Governorships
State	Before 2011 elections	After 2011 elections
Kentucky	Democratic	Democratic
Louisiana	Republican	Republican
Mississippi	Republican	Republican
West Virginia	Democratic	Democratic
