= 2011 United States gubernatorial elections =

- November 8, 2011; October 4 (West Virginia); October 22 (Louisiana)

4 governorships (Note: including a special election in West Virginia)
	Majority party	Minority party
Party	Republican	Democratic
Seats before	29	20
Seats after	29	20
Seat change	Steady	Steady
Popular vote	1,653,223	1,144,030
Percentage	54.22%	37.52%
Seats up	2	2
Seats won	2	2
- Map of the results Democratic hold Republican hold No election

United States gubernatorial elections were held in four states in October and November 2011, with regularly scheduled elections in Kentucky, Mississippi, and Louisiana; and a special election in West Virginia. None of these four governorships changed party hands, with Democratic incumbents Steve Beshear and Earl Ray Tomblin winning in Kentucky and West Virginia, respectively; and Republicans re-electing Bobby Jindal in Louisiana and holding the open seat in Mississippi.

== Election predictions ==
Several sites and individuals publish predictions of competitive seats. These predictions look at factors such as the strength of the incumbent (if the incumbent is running for re-election), the strength of the candidates, and the partisan leanings of the state (reflected in part by the state's Cook Partisan Voting Index rating). The predictions assign ratings to each state, with the rating indicating the predicted advantage that a party has in winning that seat.

Most election predictors use:

- "tossup": no advantage
- "tilt" (used by some predictors): advantage that is not quite as strong as "lean"
- "lean": slight advantage
- "likely": significant, but surmountable, advantage
- "safe" or "solid": near-certain chance of victory

State	Incumbent	Last race	Cook Sep 15, 2011	IE Aug 12, 2011	Sabato Aug 24, 2011	Gov Jul 25, 2011	Result
Kentucky	Steve Beshear	58.71% D	Lean D	Lean D	Likely D	Lean D	Beshear; 55.72% D
Louisiana	Bobby Jindal	53.91% R	Solid R	Solid R	Safe R	Safe R	Jindal; 65.80% R
Mississippi	Haley Barbour (term-limited)	57.90% R	Safe R	Solid R	Safe R	Safe R	Bryant; 60.98% R
West Virginia	Earl Ray Tomblin	69.81% D	Lean D	Lean D	Likely D	Lean D	Tomblin; 49.55% D

== Race summary ==
State	Incumbent	Party	First elected	Result	Candidates
Kentucky	Steve Beshear	Democratic	2007	Incumbent re-elected.	▌ ✓ Steve Beshear (Democratic) 55.7%; ▌David L. Williams (Republican) 35.3%; ▌Gatewood Galbraith (Independent) 9.0%
Louisiana	Bobby Jindal	Republican	2007	Incumbent re-elected.	▌ ✓ Bobby Jindal (Republican) 65.8%; ▌Tara Hollis (Democratic) 17.9%; ▌Cary Deaton (Democratic) 4.9%; ▌Trey Roberts (Democratic) 3.3%; ▌David Blanchard (Independent) 2.6%; ▌Niki Papazoglakis (Democratic) 2.1%; ▌Scott Lewis (Libertarian) 1.2%
Mississippi	Haley Barbour	Republican	2003	Incumbent term-limited. New governor elected. Republican hold.	▌ ✓ Phil Bryant (Republican) 61.0%; ▌Johnny DuPree (Democratic) 39.0%
West Virginia (special)	Earl Ray Tomblin	Democratic	2010 (Note: Tomblin took office after his predecessor (Joe Manchin) resigned.)	Incumbent elected to full term.	▌ ✓ Earl Ray Tomblin (Democratic) 49.6%; ▌Bill Maloney (Republican) 47.0%; ▌Bob Henry Baber (Mountain) 2.0%; ▌Marla Ingels (Independent) 1.0%

== Closest races ==
States where the margin of victory was under 5%:

1. West Virginia, 2.5%

Blue denotes states won by Democrats.

== Kentucky ==
2011 Kentucky gubernatorial election
- November 8, 2011
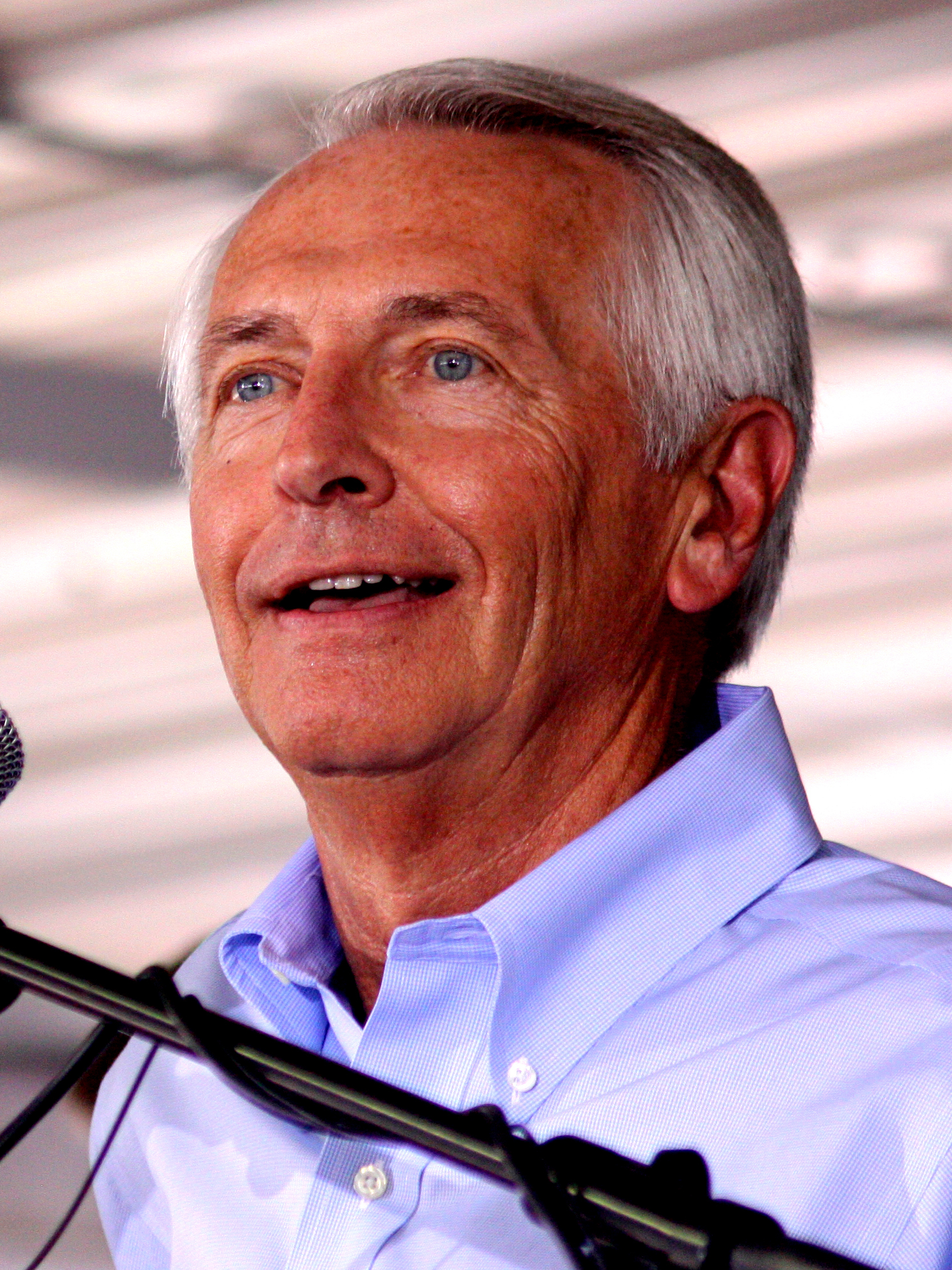

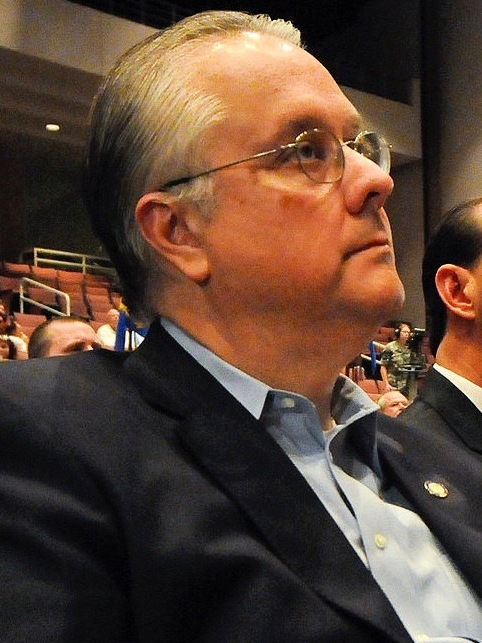

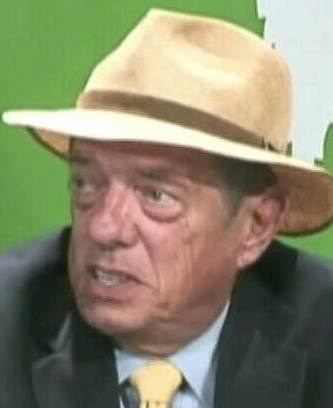
Nominee	Steve Beshear	David L. Williams	Gatewood Galbraith
Party	Democratic	Republican	Independent
Running mate	Jerry Abramson	Richie Farmer	Dea Riley
Popular vote	464,245	294,034	74,860
Percentage	55.7%	35.3%	9.0%
- County results
Governor before election
Steve Beshear
Democratic
Elected Governor
Steve Beshear
Democratic

On July 19, 2009, Steve Beshear announced his intention to run for re-election in 2011 and that then-Louisville mayor Jerry Abramson would be his running mate. On January 6, 2011, Beshear and Abramson officially filed their candidacy.

Businessman Phil Moffett, Jefferson County Clerk Bobbie Holsclaw, and State Senate president David L. Williams were the declared Republican candidates. Agriculture commissioner Richie Farmer Secretary of State Trey Grayson, and Businessman Bill Johnson, were also speculated candidates, but all declined. However, Farmer would run as Williams' running mate. The Williams-Farmer ticket won the primary on May 17.

In the general election, Beshear won, defeating Williams and independent candidate Gatewood Galbraith.

2011 Kentucky gubernatorial election
Party	Candidate	Votes	%
Democratic	Steve Beshear (incumbent)	464,245	55.72
Republican	David L. Williams	294,034	35.29
Independent	Gatewood Galbraith	74,860	8.99
Total votes		833,139	100.00
Democratic hold			

== Louisiana ==
2011 Louisiana gubernatorial election
- October 22, 2011
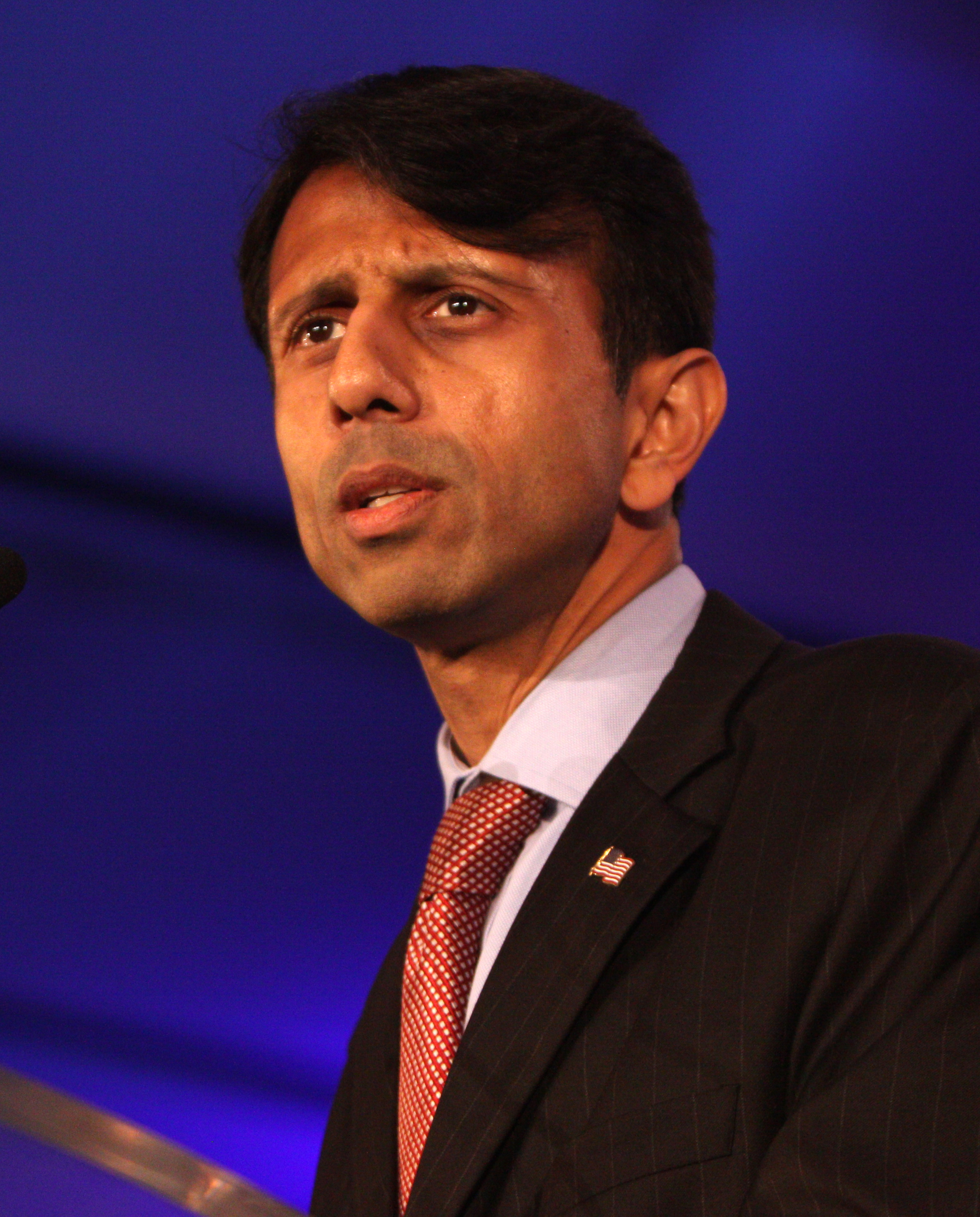

Candidate	Bobby Jindal	Tara Hollis
Party	Republican	Democratic
Popular vote	673,239	182,925
Percentage	65.8%	17.9%
- County results
Governor before election
Bobby Jindal
Republican
Elected Governor
Bobby Jindal
Republican

In 2008 Bobby Jindal stated that it was unlikely he would run for president in 2012 and that his primary electoral goal in the future would be on re-election in 2011. On August 15, 2010, he confirmed his intention to run for re-election.

Candidates who opposed Jindal included Attorney Cary Deaton (D), Teachers Tara Hollis (D) and Trey Roberts (D), victim advocacy activist Androniki "Niki Bird" Papazoglakis (D), Former Vice Chairman of the Libertarian Party of Louisiana Scott Lewis, ex-Louisiana Department of Health and Hospitals David Blanchard (I), Computer Engineer Lenny Bollingham (I), Accountant Ron Ceasar (I), and Retired Volunteer Fire Chief Bob Lang (I).

The election was then held on October 22 with all the candidates competing in a nonpartisan blanket primary. Jindal was elected to a second term, receiving an outright majority of the vote (thus a runoff election that would have occurred on November 19 became unnecessary).

2011 Louisiana gubernatorial election
Party	Candidate	Votes	%
Republican	Bobby Jindal (incumbent)	673,239	65.80
Democratic	Tara Hollis	182,925	17.88
Democratic	Cary Deaton	50,071	4.89
Democratic	Trey Roberts	33,280	3.25
Independent	David Blanchard	26,705	2.61
Democratic	Niki Bird Papazoglakis	21,885	2.14
Libertarian	Scott Lewis	12,528	1.22
Independent	Bob Lang	9,109	0.89
Independent	Ron Ceasar	8,179	0.80
Independent	Lenny Bollingham	5,242	0.51
Total votes		1,023,163	100.00
Republican hold			

== Mississippi ==
2011 Mississippi gubernatorial election
- November 8, 2011
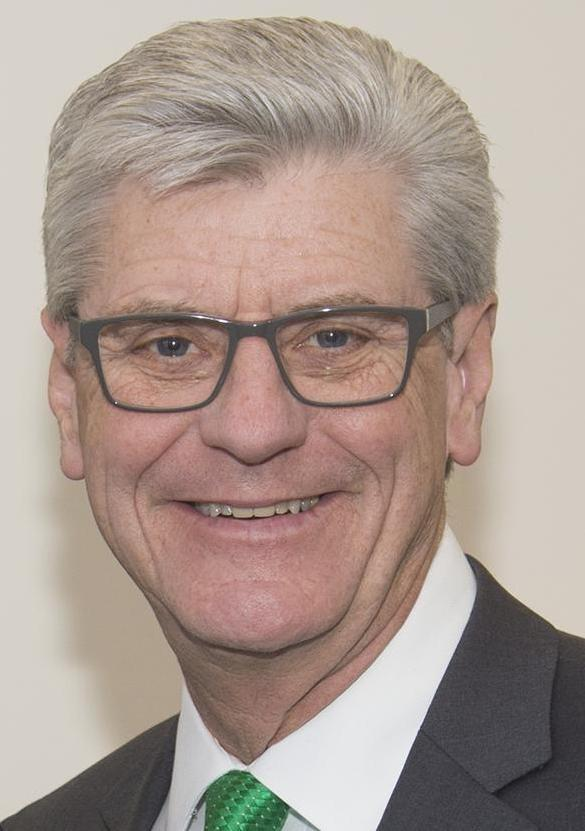

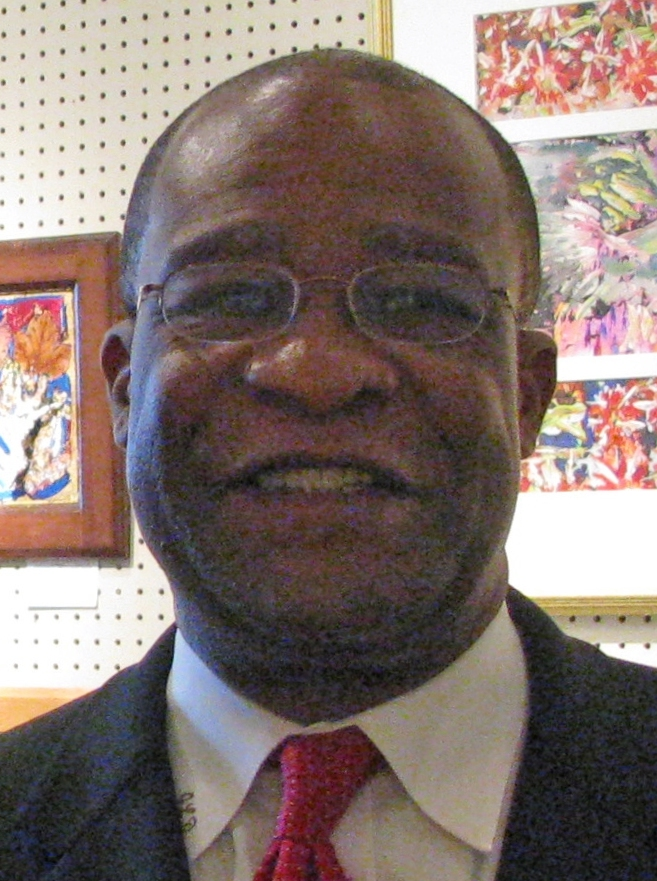
Nominee	Phil Bryant	Johnny DuPree
Party	Republican	Democratic
Popular vote	544,851	348,617
Percentage	61.0%	39.0%
- County results
Governor before election
Haley Barbour
Republican
Elected Governor
Phil Bryant
Republican

Incumbent Governor Haley Barbour was term-limited in 2011.

The Republican candidates included author, small business owner, and Baptist minister James Broadwater; Lt. Governor Phil Bryant; former New Orleans Federal Reserve Board Chairman Dave Dennis; and Pearl River County District Supervisor Hudson Holliday. Bryant won the Republican nomination by a wide margin.

Prominent state businessman Bill Luckett and Hattiesburg Mayor Johnny DuPree were two declared Democratic candidates. Dupree defeated Luckett in the Primary runoff to win the Democratic nomination.

Bryant ended up defeating Dupree in the general election.

The Lieutenant Governor was elected separately.

2011 Mississippi gubernatorial election
Party	Candidate	Votes	%
Republican	Phil Bryant	544,851	60.98
Democratic	Johnny DuPree	348,617	39.02
Total votes		893,468	100.00
Republican hold			

== West Virginia (special) ==
2011 West Virginia gubernatorial special election
- October 4, 2011
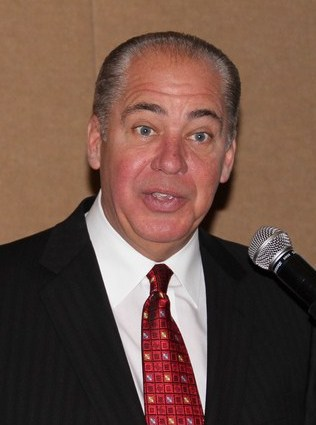

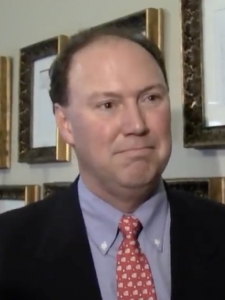
Nominee	Earl Ray Tomblin	Bill Maloney
Party	Democratic	Republican
Popular vote	149,202	141,656
Percentage	49.6%	47.0%
- County results
Governor before election
Earl Ray Tomblin
Democratic
Elected Governor
Earl Ray Tomblin
Democratic

The Supreme Court of Appeals of West Virginia ruled on January 18, 2011 that the state must hold a special gubernatorial election in 2011 to fill the vacancy resulting from Joe Manchin's election to the United States Senate. State Senate President Earl Ray Tomblin ascended to the office of Acting Governor in 2010; he is eligible to seek election for the remainder of Manchin's term and has stated that he will do so.

Other Democratic candidates included state House Speaker Rick Thompson, Acting President of the West Virginia Senate Jeffrey V. Kessler, state Secretary of State Natalie Tennant, and state Treasurer John Perdue. Tomlin overcame intra-party opposition in the May 14 primary and thus advanced to the general election.

The Declared Republican candidates include former Secretary of State Betty Ireland, state Senate Minority Whip Clark Barnes, and Putnam County Prosecutor Mark Sorsaia. U.S. Representative Shelley Moore Capito and businessman John Raese have both stated that they will not run. Businessman Bill Maloney won the Republican primary in an upset and faced Tomblin in the general election.

In the general election, Tomblin defeated Maloney.

2011 West Virginia gubernatorial special election
Party	Candidate	Votes	%
Democratic	Earl Ray Tomblin (incumbent)	149,202	49.55
Republican	Bill Maloney	141,656	47.05
Mountain	Bob Henry Baber	6,083	2.02
Independent	Marla Ingels	2,875	0.95
American Third Position	Harry Bertram	1,111	0.37
Write-in		157	0.05
Total votes		301,084	100.00
Democratic hold			
