= Senator Farris =

Senator Farris may refer to:

- Ion Farris (1878–1934), Florida State Senate
- John Wallace de Beque Farris (1878–1970), Senate of Canada
- Ralph W. Farris (1886–1968), Maine State Senate
- Ron Farris (fl. 1990s–2000s), Mississippi State Senate

== See also ==
- Senator Ferris (disambiguation)
