= 2015 Mississippi gubernatorial election =

- November 3, 2015
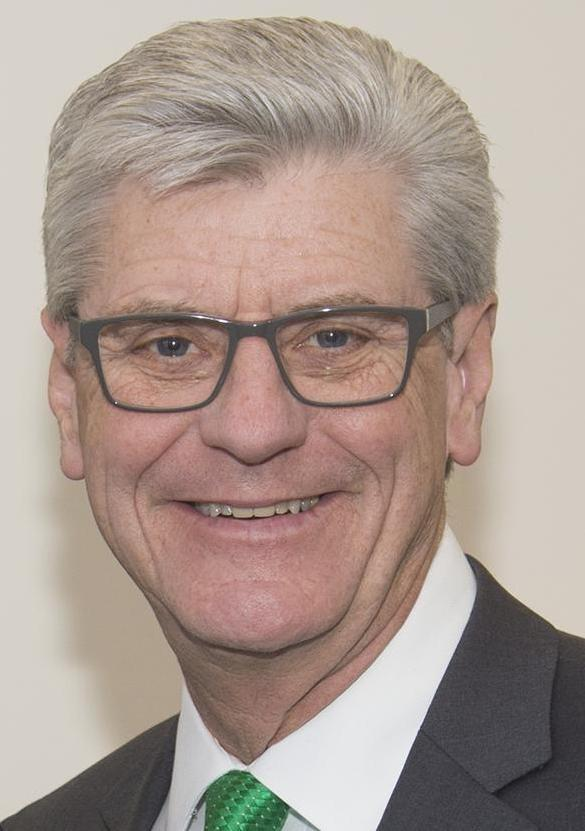

Nominee	Phil Bryant	Robert Gray
Party	Republican	Democratic
Electoral vote	85	37
Popular vote	480,399	234,858
Percentage	66.24%	32.38%
- Bryant: 40–50% 50–60% 60–70% 70–80% 80–90% >90% Gray: 40–50% 50–60% 60–70% 70–80% 80–90% >90% Tie: 40–50% 50%
Governor before election
Phil Bryant
Republican
Elected Governor
Phil Bryant
Republican

The 2015 Mississippi gubernatorial election took place on November 3, 2015, to elect the governor of Mississippi. Incumbent Republican governor Phil Bryant won a second and final term in office with more than 66% of votes, the highest percentage and vote share that a Republican has ever won in a gubernatorial election in Mississippi.

The election gained national news coverage and attention due to the unexpected Democratic nominee selection of truck driver and former firefighter, Robert Gray, who had not had any political experience prior to his candidacy. As of 2026, this is the last time that the following counties have voted Republican for governor: Clay, Marshall, Quitman, Sharkey, and Tallahatchie.

== Background ==
Mississippi is one of nine states and territories that has lifetime limits of two terms for its governor. In 2011, with incumbent Republican governor Haley Barbour term-limited, Republican Lieutenant Governor Phil Bryant was elected to succeed him. Bryant won the Republican primary with 59% of the vote and then defeated the Democratic nominee, Hattiesburg Mayor Johnny DuPree, with 61% of the vote.

== Republican primary ==
=== Candidates ===
==== Declared ====
- Phil Bryant, incumbent governor
- Mitch Young

==== Declined ====
- Chris McDaniel, state senator and candidate for the U.S. Senate in 2014
- Michael Watson, state senator

=== Result ===
Republican primary results
Party	Candidate	Votes	%
Republican	Phil Bryant (incumbent)	256,689	91.86%
Republican	Mitch Young	22,738	8.14%
Total votes		279,427	100.00%

== Democratic primary ==
=== Candidates ===
==== Declared ====
- Robert Gray, truck driver and retired firefighter
- Valerie Short, physician
- Vicki Slater, attorney

==== Declined ====
- Travis Childers, former U.S. representative and nominee for the U.S. Senate in 2014
- Jim Hood, Attorney General of Mississippi (running for re-election)
- Bill Luckett, Mayor of Clarksdale and candidate for governor in 2011
- Dick Molpus, former Secretary of State of Mississippi and nominee for governor in 1995
- Brandon Presley, Commissioner for the Northern District of the Mississippi Public Service Commission and former mayor of Nettleton (running for re-election)

=== Result ===
Results by county Map legend: Gray—60–70%; Gray—50–60%; Gray—40–50%; Gray—30–40%; Slater—40–50%; Short—40–50%

Democratic primary results
Party	Candidate	Votes	%
Democratic	Robert Gray	152,087	50.80%
Democratic	Vicki Slater	91,104	30.43%
Democratic	Valerie Short	56,177	18.77%
Total votes		299,368	100.00%

== Reform Party nomination ==
=== Candidate ===
- Shawn O'Hara, perennial candidate

== General election ==
=== Predictions ===
Source	Ranking	As of
The Cook Political Report	Safe R	October 26, 2015
Rothenberg Political Report	Safe R	October 27, 2015
Sabato's Crystal Ball	Safe R	October 29, 2015
DKE	Safe R	October 29, 2015

=== Polling ===
Poll source	Date(s) administered	Sample size	Margin of error	Phil Bryant (R)	Robert Gray (D)	Shawn O'Hara (Ref)	Undecided
Mason-Dixon	October 21–25, 2015	625	± 4%	66%	28%	1%	5%

Hypothetical polling

Poll source	Date(s) administered	Sample size	Margin of error	Phil Bryant (R)	Jim Hood (D)	Other	Undecided
Public Policy Polling	July 10–13, 2014	691	± 3.7%	44%	33%	—	22%

Poll source	Date(s) administered	Sample size	Margin of error	Phil Bryant (R)	Brandon Presley (D)	Other	Undecided
Public Policy Polling	July 10–13, 2014	691	± 3.7%	49%	26%	—	25%

Poll source	Date(s) administered	Sample size	Margin of error	Phil Bryant (R)	Valerie Short (D)	Other	Undecided
Mason-Dixon	April 21–23, 2015	625	± 4%	63%	28%	3%	6%

Poll source	Date(s) administered	Sample size	Margin of error	Phil Bryant (R)	Vicki Slater (D)	Other	Undecided
Mason-Dixon	April 21–23, 2015	625	± 4%	61%	30%	2%	7%

=== Results ===
Candidate	Party	Popular vote		Electoral vote	
Candidate	Party	Votes	%	Votes	%
Phil Bryant (incumbent)	Republican Party	480,399	66.24	85	69.67
Robert Gray	Democratic Party	234,858	32.38	37	30.33
Shawn O'Hara	Reform Party	9,950	1.37		
Total		725,207	100.00	122	100.00
Source: Mississippi Secretary of State

==== By county ====
County	Phil Bryant Republican		Robert Gray Democratic		Shawn O'Hara Reform		Margin		Total
County	#	%	#	%	#	%	#	%	Total
Adams	3,767	51.06%	3,539	47.97%	71	0.96%	228	3.09%	7,377
Alcorn	8,817	83.34%	1,649	15.59%	113	1.07%	7,168	67.76%	10,579
Amite	3,176	61.96%	1,874	36.56%	76	1.48%	1,302	25.40%	5,126
Attala	3,449	67.96%	1,577	31.07%	49	0.97%	1,872	36.89%	5,075
Benton	1,753	63.40%	958	34.65%	54	1.95%	795	28.75%	2,765
Bolivar	4,255	45.30%	5,040	53.66%	98	1.04%	-785	-8.36%	9,393
Calhoun	3,957	76.81%	1,144	22.20%	51	0.99%	2,813	54.60%	5,152
Carroll	2,934	72.25%	1,096	26.99%	31	0.76%	1,838	45.26%	4,061
Chickasaw	3,545	61.76%	2,141	37.30%	54	0.94%	1,404	24.46%	5,740
Choctaw	2,215	78.66%	570	20.24%	31	1.10%	1,645	58.42%	2,816
Claiborne	1,158	33.24%	2,250	64.58%	76	2.18%	-1,092	-31.34%	3,484
Clarke	4,253	71.72%	1,595	26.90%	82	1.38%	2,658	44.82%	5,930
Clay	3,601	49.85%	3,547	49.10%	76	1.05%	54	0.75%	7,224
Coahoma	1,867	46.58%	2,095	52.27%	46	1.15%	-228	-5.69%	4,008
Copiah	4,088	55.66%	3,162	43.06%	94	1.28%	926	12.61%	7,344
Covington	4,471	70.02%	1,838	28.79%	76	1.19%	2,633	41.24%	6,385
DeSoto	16,837	79.87%	3,904	18.52%	339	1.61%	12,933	61.35%	21,080
Forrest	11,998	69.61%	4,968	28.82%	270	1.57%	7,030	40.79%	17,236
Franklin	2,053	66.46%	996	32.24%	40	1.29%	1,057	34.22%	3,089
George	5,348	87.51%	634	10.37%	129	2.11%	4,714	77.14%	6,111
Greene	3,097	79.78%	697	17.95%	88	2.27%	2,400	61.82%	3,882
Grenada	4,462	65.11%	2,324	33.91%	67	0.98%	2,138	31.20%	6,853
Hancock	6,675	78.64%	1,634	19.25%	179	2.11%	5,041	59.39%	8,488
Harrison	21,548	69.52%	8,709	28.10%	739	2.38%	12,839	41.42%	30,996
Hinds	22,403	39.33%	33,548	58.89%	1,012	1.78%	-11,145	-19.57%	56,963
Holmes	1,610	32.45%	3,272	65.95%	79	1.59%	-1,662	-33.50%	4,961
Humphreys	1,133	42.71%	1,490	56.16%	30	1.13%	-357	-13.46%	2,653
Issaquena	346	61.35%	211	37.41%	7	1.24%	135	23.94%	564
Itawamba	6,053	86.81%	840	12.05%	80	1.15%	5,213	74.76%	6,973
Jackson	18,323	73.83%	6,000	24.18%	494	1.99%	12,323	49.66%	24,817
Jasper	3,644	56.86%	2,654	41.41%	111	1.73%	990	15.45%	6,409
Jefferson	713	26.10%	1,971	72.14%	48	1.76%	-1,258	-46.05%	2,732
Jefferson Davis	2,009	49.24%	2,032	49.80%	39	0.96%	-23	-0.56%	4,080
Jones	13,960	79.49%	3,356	19.11%	247	1.41%	10,604	60.38%	17,563
Kemper	1,952	51.30%	1,814	47.67%	39	1.02%	138	3.63%	3,805
Lafayette	6,881	62.76%	3,898	35.55%	185	1.69%	2,983	27.21%	10,964
Lamar	11,555	84.63%	1,941	14.22%	158	1.16%	9,614	70.41%	13,654
Lauderdale	12,130	71.38%	4,686	27.58%	177	1.04%	7,444	43.81%	16,993
Lawrence	3,446	69.34%	1,475	29.68%	49	0.99%	1,971	39.66%	4,970
Leake	3,885	64.51%	2,090	34.71%	47	0.78%	1,795	29.81%	6,022
Lee	14,402	74.66%	4,665	24.18%	224	1.16%	9,737	50.47%	19,291
Leflore	3,177	44.61%	3,868	54.31%	77	1.08%	-691	-9.70%	7,122
Lincoln	7,984	76.58%	2,362	22.65%	80	0.77%	5,622	53.92%	10,426
Lowndes	10,287	58.53%	7,137	40.61%	151	0.86%	3,150	17.92%	17,575
Madison	18,937	69.41%	8,002	29.33%	345	1.26%	10,935	40.08%	27,284
Marion	5,674	75.56%	1,762	23.47%	73	0.97%	3,912	52.10%	7,509
Marshall	3,412	51.81%	3,105	47.15%	68	1.03%	307	4.66%	6,585
Monroe	7,682	71.57%	2,951	27.49%	101	0.94%	4,731	44.07%	10,734
Montgomery	2,497	63.76%	1,385	35.37%	34	0.87%	1,112	28.40%	3,916
Neshoba	5,968	81.53%	1,291	17.64%	61	0.83%	4,677	63.89%	7,320
Newton	5,175	75.75%	1,584	23.19%	73	1.07%	3,591	52.56%	6,832
Noxubee	1,217	35.21%	2,190	63.37%	49	1.42%	-973	-28.15%	3,456
Oktibbeha	6,773	60.23%	4,349	38.67%	123	1.09%	2,424	21.56%	11,245
Panola	6,868	60.64%	4,344	38.36%	113	1.00%	2,524	22.29%	11,325
Pearl River	7,501	81.58%	1,501	16.32%	193	2.10%	6,000	65.25%	9,195
Perry	3,282	81.14%	688	17.01%	75	1.85%	2,594	64.13%	4,045
Pike	6,682	55.89%	5,126	42.88%	147	1.23%	1,556	13.02%	11,955
Pontotoc	7,008	83.33%	1,315	15.64%	87	1.03%	5,693	67.69%	8,410
Prentiss	5,155	79.66%	1,258	19.44%	58	0.90%	3,897	60.22%	6,471
Quitman	1,449	50.56%	1,359	47.42%	58	2.02%	90	3.14%	2,866
Rankin	27,584	81.56%	5,811	17.18%	427	1.26%	21,773	64.38%	33,822
Scott	4,688	65.82%	2,365	33.21%	69	0.97%	2,323	32.62%	7,122
Sharkey	840	50.09%	816	48.66%	21	1.25%	24	1.43%	1,677
Simpson	5,656	72.33%	2,077	26.56%	87	1.11%	3,579	45.77%	7,820
Smith	4,680	81.24%	1,003	17.41%	78	1.35%	3,677	63.83%	5,761
Stone	4,093	77.92%	1,058	20.14%	102	1.94%	3,035	57.78%	5,253
Sunflower	2,771	48.06%	2,903	50.35%	92	1.60%	-132	-2.29%	5,766
Tallahatchie	2,114	58.25%	1,459	40.20%	56	1.54%	655	18.05%	3,629
Tate	4,486	73.59%	1,527	25.05%	83	1.36%	2,959	48.54%	6,096
Tippah	5,329	81.87%	1,109	17.04%	71	1.09%	4,220	64.83%	6,509
Tishomingo	5,437	80.92%	1,163	17.31%	119	1.77%	4,274	63.61%	6,719
Tunica	1,201	47.21%	1,281	50.35%	62	2.44%	-80	-3.14%	2,544
Union	6,548	85.59%	1,027	13.42%	75	0.98%	5,521	72.17%	7,650
Walthall	3,312	68.18%	1,470	30.26%	76	1.56%	1,842	37.92%	4,858
Warren	7,641	63.79%	4,196	35.03%	141	1.18%	3,445	28.76%	11,978
Washington	4,386	45.46%	5,153	53.41%	109	1.13%	-767	-7.95%	9,648
Wayne	4,377	68.33%	1,929	30.11%	100	1.56%	2,448	38.21%	6,406
Webster	2,898	82.63%	582	16.60%	27	0.77%	2,316	66.04%	3,507
Wilkinson	1,311	35.92%	2,255	61.78%	84	2.30%	-944	-25.86%	3,650
Winston	4,140	65.14%	2,178	34.27%	38	0.60%	1,962	30.87%	6,356
Yalobusha	2,433	63.66%	1,341	35.09%	48	1.26%	1,092	28.57%	3,822
Yazoo	3,977	59.05%	2,694	40.00%	64	0.95%	1,283	19.05%	6,735
Totals	480,399	66.24%	234,858	32.38%	9,950	1.37%	245,541	33.86%	725,207

==== Counties that flipped from Democratic to Republican ====
- Adams (largest city: Natchez)
- Clay (largest city: West Point)
- Jasper (largest city: Bay Springs)
- Kemper (largest city: De Kalb)
- Marshall (largest city: Holly Springs)
- Quitman (largest city: Marks)
- Sharkey (largest city: Rolling Fork)
- Tallahatchie (largest city: Charleston)

==== By congressional district ====
Bryant won three of four congressional districts.

District	Bryant	Gray	Representative
1st	73%	26%	Trent Kelly
2nd	49%	50%	Bennie Thompson
3rd	69%	30%	Gregg Harper
4th	76%	23%	Steven Palazzo

== See also ==
- 2015 Mississippi elections
