= Toby Barker =

American politician

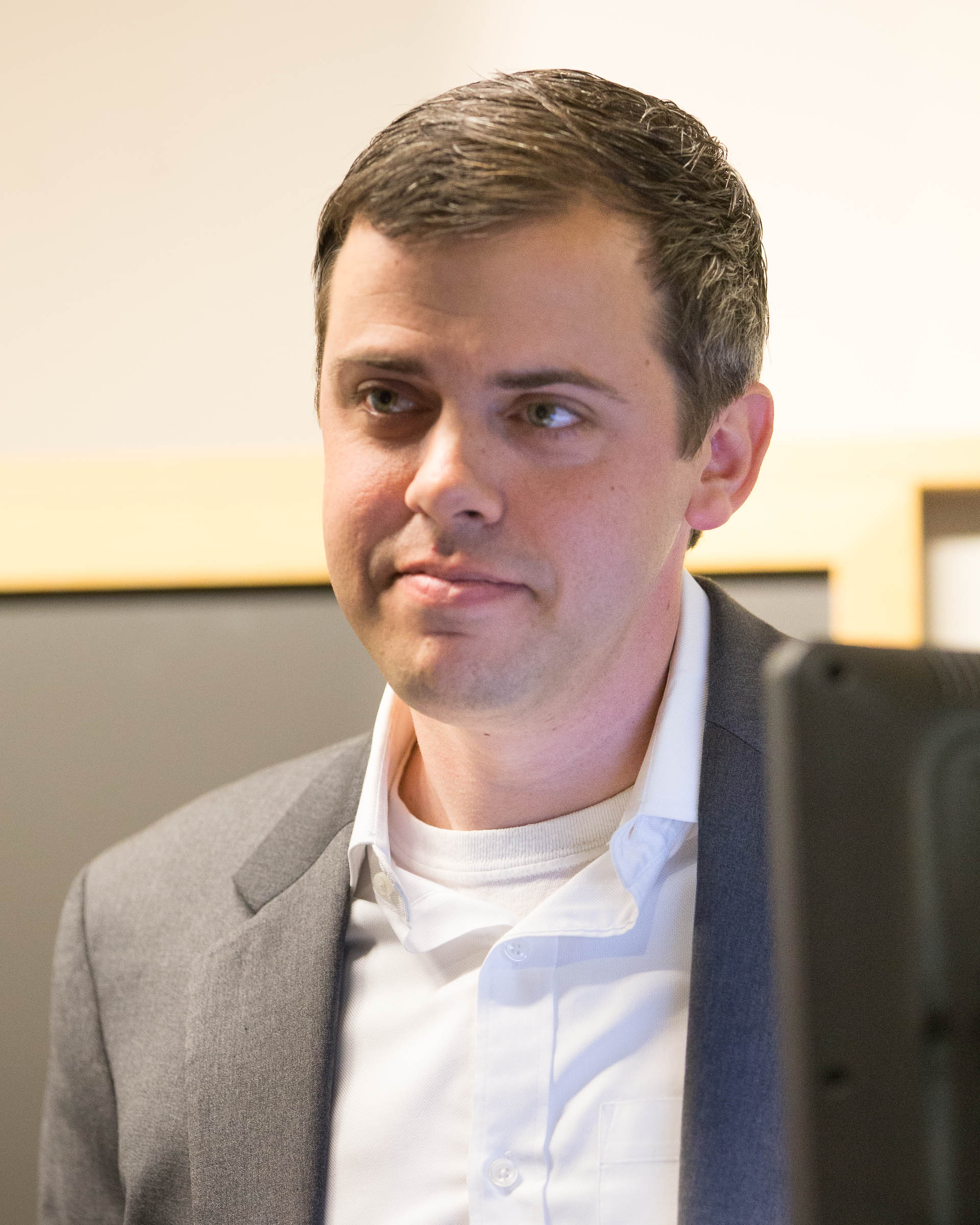

Mayor of Hattiesburg
- Incumbent
- Assumed office July 3, 2017
- Preceded by: Johnny DuPree

Member of the Mississippi House of Representatives from the 102nd district
- In office 2008–2017
- Preceded by: Lee Jarrell Davis
- Succeeded by: Missy McGee

Personal details
- Born: December 31, 1981 (age 44) Meridian, Mississippi, U.S.
- Party: Independent (since 2017)
- Other political affiliations: Republican (before 2017)
- Spouse: Kate Northrop (div. 2026)
- Children: 2
- Education: University of Southern Mississippi (B.A., 2004; M.A., 2006) Brown University (Master of Healthcare Leadership, 2015)
- Website: http://www.tobybarker.com/

Toby Barker (born December 31, 1981) is an American politician and the current Mayor of Hattiesburg, Mississippi. Before serving as mayor, he was a member of the Mississippi House of Representatives, representing the 102nd District from 2008-2017). When he was elected, Barker (then 25 years old) was the youngest legislator elected in Mississippi's history. He is a former member of the Republican Party.

== Early life and career ==
Barker is a graduate of The University of Southern Mississippi with a Bachelor of Arts degree in Communications (2004) and a Master of Science degree in Economic Development (2006). He also holds a Master of Healthcare Leadership degree from Brown University (2015).

== Political career ==
=== State Representative ===
In 2007, Barker was elected to the Mississippi House of Representatives. He served as chair of the House Performance Based Budgeting Committee.

=== Mayor ===
In 2017, Barker ran as an independent and defeated four-term incumbent Johnny DuPree to become Hattiesburg's 35th mayor.

In 2021, Barker defeated Democrat Lakeylah White to win reelection.

The 2025 mayoral election was held on June 3, 2025, alongside other Hattiesburg municipal races. Barker was eligible for re-election to a third four-year term. Primary elections were canceled, as no one else challenged him for the seat.

In 2026, Baker was elected as 2nd Vice President for the National League of Cities. He previously served as president of the Mississippi Municipal League.
