= List of mayors of Hattiesburg, Mississippi =

This article contains a list of mayors of Hattiesburg, Mississippi, United States.

== History ==
Hattiesburg was incorporated as a town in 1884 and as a city in 1890. The initial governing structure included a mayor and eight aldermen until 1911 when Hattiesburg adopted a city commission form of government with a mayor and two commissioners, the first of its kind in the state. Since 1985, Hattiesburg has operated under a mayor-council government with the city split into five wards, each with a single councilmember.

== List of mayors ==
Mayor	In office	Notes
Oliver Hazard Perry Jones	1884–January 1885	
William Johnson	January 1885–January 1886	
James Jordan Thornton	January 1886–January 1887	
David Black	January 1887–January 1889	Served two one-year terms
Walter Moreland Conner	January 1889–January 1891	Served two one-year terms
J. M. Williamson	January 1891–January 1893	Served two one-year terms
Terms expanded to two years
D. B. Hover	January 1893–January 1894	
Evans Hall	January 1894–January 1897	
T. J. Mixon	January 1897–January 1899	
Evans Hall	January 1899–January 1901	
Charles W. Rich	January 1901–January 1907	
J. D. Donald	January 1911–January 1913	
Terms expanded to four years
T. E. Batson	January 1913–July 1922	Died in office
B. D. Moore	July 1922–September 1922	Appointed
W. S. F. Tatum	September 1922–January 1925	Special election
B. D. Moore	January 1925–January 1929	
W. S. F. Tatum	January 1929–January 1937	
Travis H. Boykin	January 1937–January 1941	
George M. Calhoun	January 1941–January 1949	
D. W. Holmes	January 1949–December 18, 1950	Died in office; Killed by drunk driver
Mrs. D. W. Holmes	December 21, 1950 – March 15, 1951	Provisional appointment
Edward J. Currie, Sr.	March 15, 1951–July 1953	Special election
Moran M. Pope	January 1953–January 1957	
D. Gary Sutherland	January 1957–July 1957	
Inaugurations moved from January to July
Richard T. Carlisle	July 1957–July 1961	
Claude F. Pittman, Sr.	July 1961–July 17, 1962	Submitted resignation in May 1962
Claude F. Pittman, Jr.	July 17, 1962–July 1965	Special election
Paul E. Grady	July 1965–July 1973	First Republican mayor
A. L. "Bud" Gerrard, Jr.	July 1973–May 1980	Resigned
G. D. Williamson	May 28, 1980 – August 4, 1980	Interim appointment
Bobby L. Chain	August 4, 1980–July 1985	Special election
G. D. Williamson	July 1985–July 1989	
J. Ed Morgan	July 1989–July 2001	
Johnny DuPree	July 2001–July 3, 2017	First African-American mayor
Toby Barker	July 3, 2017–present	

== Sources ==
- Hattiesburg Municipal Records The University of Southern Mississippi – McCain Library and Archives
