= Chris Johnson (Mississippi politician) =

American politician

Member of the Mississippi State Senate from the 44th district
- Incumbent
- Assumed office January 6, 2026
- Preceded by: John A. Polk

Member of the Mississippi State Senate from the 45th district
- In office January 7, 2020 – January 5, 2026
- Preceded by: Billy Hudson
- Succeeded by: Johnny DuPree

Member of the Mississippi House of Representatives from the 87th district
- In office January 5, 2016 – January 7, 2020
- Preceded by: Johnny Stringer
- Succeeded by: William Andrews III

Personal details
- Born: Chris Johnson; 1978 (age 47–48)
- Party: Republican
- Children: 2
- Education: Pearl River Community College; University of Southern Mississippi
- Occupation: Business owner

Chris Johnson (born 1978) is an American politician serving in the Mississippi State Senate from the 44th district. He served in the Mississippi House of Representatives from the 87th district from 2016 to 2020.

== Early life and education ==
Johnson attended Forrest County Agricultural High School located in the outskirts of Hattiesburg, Mississippi. He attended Pearl River Community College and graduated from the University of Southern Mississippi with a Bachelor of Science in Accounting in 2001.

== Career ==
Johnson is an owner of multiple businesses, including a financial services firm operating in four states.

In 2015, he ran as a Republican for election to the Mississippi House of Representatives for the 87th district, which covers Forrest and Lamar counties, to fill the seat of retiring Democrat Johnny Stringer. He got 49.2% of the vote in the Republican primary and 80.2% of the vote in the general election; he assumed office on January 5, 2016. In the house, he was vice-chairman for the Public Health and Human Services committee and was a member on the following others: Agriculture; Corrections; Education; Banking and Financial Services; Transportation; and Performance Based Budgeting.

In 2019, incumbent, and friend of Johnson, Billy Hudson of the 45th district announced his retirement from the Mississippi State Senate, prompting Johnson to run for election to the seat within one day. He responded to claims of dismay from Republican leadership in the House as "rumors." He ran uncontested in the Republican primary and general election, securing 100% of the vote in both; he assumed office on January 7, 2020. In the Senate, he chairs the Constitution committee and is vice-chair for the Medicaid committee. He is a member on the following others: Appropriations; Business and Financial Institutions; Drug Policy; Education; Insurance; Public, Health, and Welfare; and Tourism.

Johnson was redistricted out of his old seat to run for District 44. He defeated the Democratic candidate Shakita Taylor for his new seat.

== Personal life ==
Johnson is married to Wendi Burton and has two children.
