= Johnny Stringer =

American politician (born 1950)

Member of the Mississippi House of Representatives from the 87th district
- In office January 3, 1980 – January 5, 2016
- Succeeded by: Chris Johnson

Personal details
- Born: February 1, 1950 (age 76) Bay Springs, Mississippi, United States
- Profession: Farmer

Johnny W. Stringer (born February 1, 1950) is an American Democratic politician. He is a former member of the Mississippi House of Representatives from the 87th District, being first elected in 1979 and retiring in 2016.
