= Billy Hudson =

American politician (1938–2022)

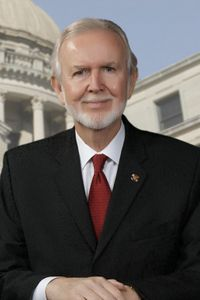

Member of the Mississippi State Senate from the 45th district
- In office 2008–2020
- Preceded by: J. Ed Morgan
- Succeeded by: Chris Johnson (Mississippi politician)

Personal details
- Born: June 16, 1938 Hattiesburg, Mississippi, U.S.
- Died: November 30, 2022 (aged 84)
- Party: Republican
- Children: 5
- Education: University of Southern Mississippi
- Occupation: Business Owner

Billy Hudson (June 16, 1938 – November 30, 2022) was an American politician who served in the Mississippi State Senate from the 45th district from 2008 until 2020.

== Education and professional career ==
Hudson attended the University of Southern Mississippi; he also attended the University of Arizona and Perkinston Junior College (now Mississippi Gulf Coast Community College) in 1957. His professional experience included working as a rancher, and he was the CEO of Hudson Salvage.

== Political career ==
Hudson was the Forrest County Supervisor for eight years and then served in the Mississippi State Senate for twelve years.

== Personal life and death ==
Hudson was married to Barbara Hudson and had five children.

Hudson died on November 30, 2022, at the age of 84.
