= 2011 Kentucky gubernatorial election =

- November 8, 2011
- Turnout: 28.6% (▼9.3%)
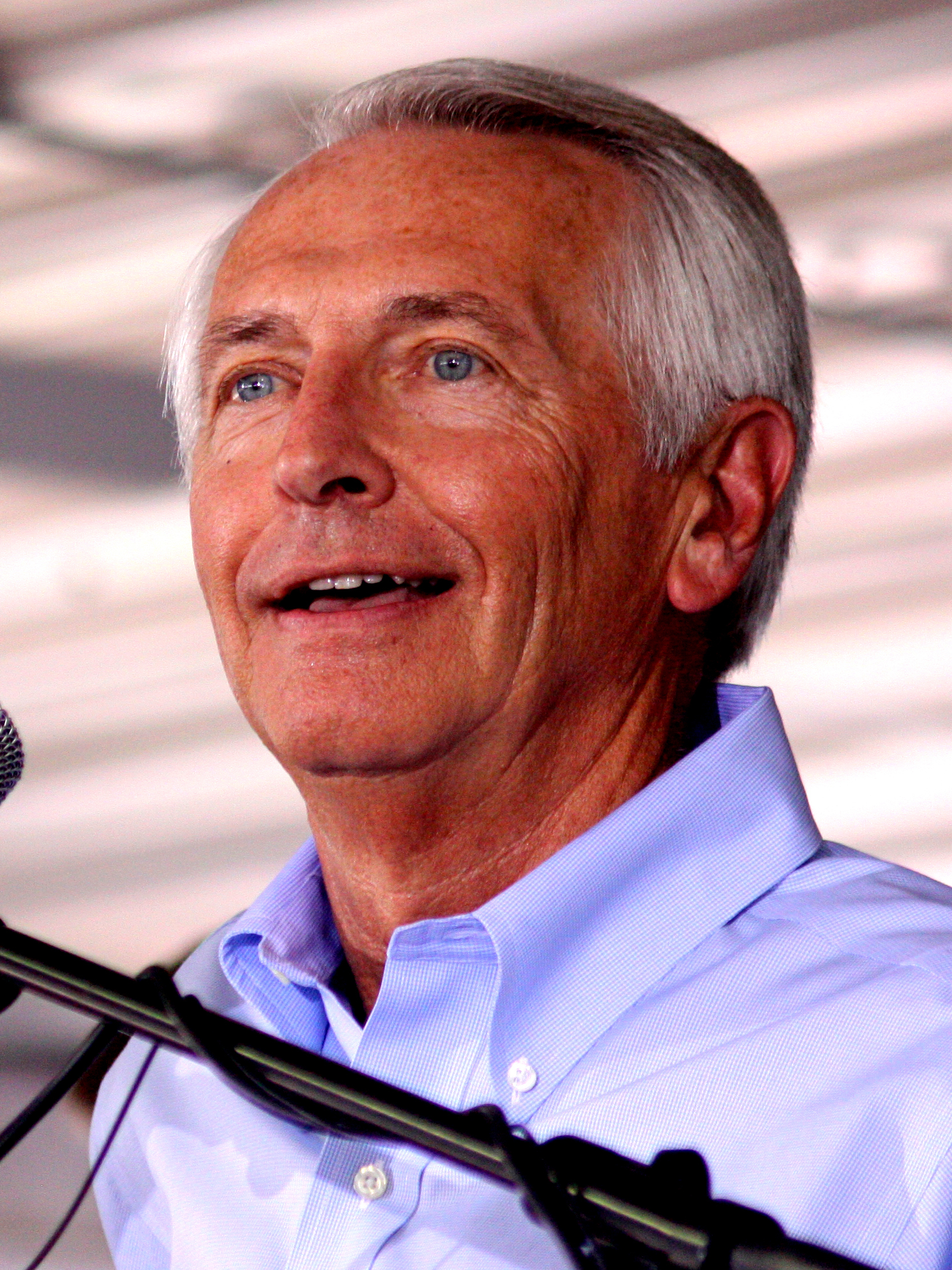

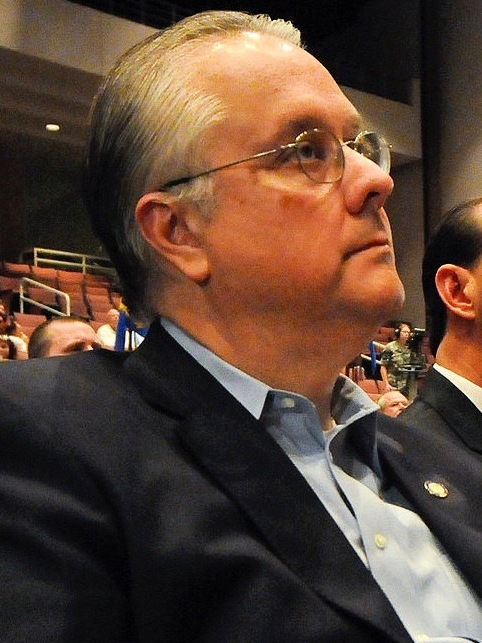

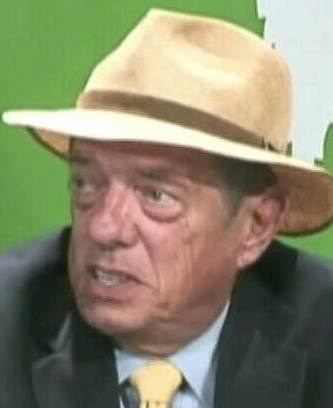
Nominee	Steve Beshear	David L. Williams	Gatewood Galbraith
Party	Democratic	Republican	Independent
Running mate	Jerry Abramson	Richie Farmer	Dea Riley
Popular vote	464,245	294,034	74,860
Percentage	55.72%	35.29%	8.99%
- Beshear: 40–50% 50–60% 60–70% 70–80% Williams: 40–50% 50–60% 60–70% 70–80%
Governor before election
Steve Beshear
Democratic
Elected Governor
Steve Beshear
Democratic

The 2011 Kentucky gubernatorial election was held on November 8, 2011, to elect the governor of Kentucky and the lieutenant governor of Kentucky. Incumbent Democrat Steve Beshear won re-election, defeating Republican challenger David L. Williams, then the president of the state senate, and Gatewood Galbraith, an independent candidate. Statewide turnout in this election was 28%.

This was one of the two Democratic-held governorships up for election in a state that John McCain won in the 2008 presidential election, the other being West Virginia.

== Background ==
On July 19, 2009, Beshear announced his intention to run for re-election. However, in that announcement, he stated that then-Louisville mayor Jerry Abramson would be his running mate in 2011 instead of current Lt. Governor Daniel Mongiardo, who chose to run for the U.S. Senate in 2010. Kentucky state law requires that gubernatorial candidates file to run with running mates; otherwise, they cannot legally raise money. Beshear wanted to fundraise, and this would have required Mongiardo to also say that he was running in 2011, which he could not do. Beshear and Abramson did not face any opposition for the Democratic nomination.

Among Republicans, Kentucky State Senate President David Williams from Burkesville announced his official candidacy along with running mate Richie Farmer, the term-limited state agriculture commissioner and former Kentucky Wildcats basketball player. Louisville businessman Phil Moffett also announced his ticket with State Representative Mike Harmon from Danville as his running mate. Moffett was seen as the Tea Party favorite. However, Williams also advocated for similar positions as Moffett, such as the repeal of the Seventeenth Amendment to the United States Constitution and promoting tax reforms similar to what Moffett proposed.

Attorney Gatewood Galbraith of Lexington filed to run his fourth gubernatorial campaign as an independent on July 4, 2009, choosing marketing consultant Dea Riley as his running mate.

== Democratic primary ==
=== Candidates ===
==== Declared ====
- Steve Beshear, incumbent governor of Kentucky, 2007–2015; former lt. governor of Kentucky, 1983–1987; former attorney general of Kentucky, 1979–1983; and former state representative, 1974–1979
  - Running mate: Jerry Abramson, Louisville mayor, 1986–1999 and 2003–2011

== Republican primary ==
=== Candidates ===
==== Declared ====
- Bobbie Holsclaw, Jefferson county clerk, 1998–2010, 2014–2025
  - Running mate: Bill Vermillion, retired U.S. Navy master chief
- Phil Moffett, Louisville businessman and Tea Party activist
  - Running mate: Mike Harmon, state representative, 2003–2016
- David L. Williams, state senate president, 2000–2012; state senator 1987–2012; and nominee for U.S. Senate in 1992
  - Running mate: Richie Farmer, Kentucky agriculture commissioner, 2004–2012

=== Polling ===
Poll Source	Date(s) administered	Sample size	Margin of error	Bobbie Holsclaw	Phil Moffett	David Williams	Undecided
Survey USA	May 4–10, 2011	500	± 4.5%	12%	21%	47%	21%
Survey USA	April 8–13, 2011	507	± 4.4%	12%	14%	49%	25%

=== Results ===
Results by county: Williams: 40–50%; 50–60%; 60–70%; 70–80%; 80–90%; Moffett: 40–50%; 50–60%; 60–70%; 70–80%; Holsclaw: 30–40%; Tie: 40–50%

Republican primary results
Party	Candidate	Votes	%
Republican	David Williams; Richie Farmer	68,528	48.0%
Republican	Phil Moffett; Mike Harmon	53,966	38.0%
Republican	Bobbie Holsclaw; Bill Vermillion Jr.	19,614	14.0%
Total votes		142,108	100.0%

== Independents ==
=== Declared ===
- Gatewood Galbraith, attorney, industrial hemp advocate and perennial candidate
  - Running mate: Dea Riley, political consultant

== General election ==
=== Predictions ===
Source	Ranking	As of
Rothenberg Political Report	Lean D	November 4, 2011
Governing	Lean D	November 4, 2011
Cook	Lean D	November 4, 2011
Sabato	Likely D	November 4, 2011

=== Polling ===
Poll source	Date(s) administered	Sample size	Margin of error	Steve Beshear (D)	David Williams (R)	Gatewood Galbraith (I)	Undecided
Survey USA	October 28 – November 1, 2011	576	± 4.2%	54%	29%	9%	8%
Braun Research	October 17–19, 2011	802	± 3.5%	54%	26%	8%	12%
Survey USA	September 22–27, 2011	569	± 4.2%	57%	26%	8%	9%
Braun Research	August 29–31, 2011	803	± 3.5%	54%	25%	7%	14%
Public Policy Polling	August 25–28, 2011	600	± 4.0%	55%	28%	10%	8%
Survey USA	July 22–27, 2011	512	± 4.4%	52%	28%	9%	11%
Braun Research	June 6–8, 2011	802	± 3.5%	51%	30%	6%	14%
Survey USA	April 8–13, 2011	1,589	± 2.5%	51%	39%	—	10%
Braun Research	February 28 – March 1, 2011	804	± 3.5%	48%	38%	—	14%
Public Policy Polling	October 28–30, 2010	1,021	± 3.1%	44%	35%	—	21%
Mason-Dixon	October 18–19, 2010	625	± 4.0%	45%	30%	5%	20%
Public Policy Polling	September 11–12, 2010	959	± 3.2%	44%	39%	—	17%
Braun Research	August 30 – September 1, 2010	802	± 3.5%	44%	38%	—	18%
Braun Research	July 19–21, 2010	803	± 3.4%	48%	30%	—	20%

Hypothetical polling

With Moffett

Poll source	Date(s) administered	Sample size	Margin of error	Steve Beshear (D)	Phil Moffett (R)	Gatewood Galbraith (I)	Other/ Undecided
Survey USA	April 8–13, 2011	1,589	± 2.5%	54%	34%	—	13%
Braun Research	February 28-March 1, 2011	804	± 3.5%	53%	28%	—	19%
Public Policy Polling	October 28–30, 2010	1,021	± 3.1%	45%	26%	—	29%
Mason-Dixon	October 18–19, 2010	625	± 4.0%	43%	24%	6%	26%
Public Policy Polling	September 11–12, 2010	959	± 3.2%	46%	28%	—	26%
Braun Research	September 1, 2010	—	—	49%	29%	—	22%

With Holsclaw

Poll source	Date(s) administered	Sample size	Margin of error	Steve Beshear (D)	Bobbie Holsclaw (R)	Gatewood Galbraith (I)	Other/ Undecided
Survey USA	April 8–13, 2011	1,589	± 2.5%	53%	34%	—	13%
Braun Research	February 28 – March 1, 2011	804	± 3.5%	53%	27%	—	21%

=== Results ===
2011 Kentucky gubernatorial election
Party	Candidate	Votes	%	±%
Democratic	Steven L. Beshear (incumbent); Jerry E. Abramson	464,245	55.72	−2.98
Republican	David L. Williams; Richie Farmer	294,034	35.29	−6.00
Independent	Gatewood Galbraith; Dea Riley	74,860	8.99	N/A
Total votes		833,139	100.0	N/A
Turnout		842,528	28.61	−9.28
Registered electors		2,944,602		
Democratic hold				

==== By county ====
County	Beshear / Abramson Democratic		Williams / Farmer Republican		Galbraith / Riley Independent		Margin		Total
County	#	%	#	%	#	%	#	%	Total
Adair	1,606	43.69%	1,877	51.06%	193	5.25%	−271	−7.37%	3,676
Allen	1,221	42.19%	1,540	53.21%	133	4.60%	−319	−11.02%	2,894
Anderson	3,048	50.23%	1,577	25.99%	1,443	23.78%	1,471	24.24%	6,068
Ballard	1,274	59.01%	773	35.80%	112	5.19%	501	23.21%	2,159
Barren	4,425	56.31%	3,003	38.22%	430	5.47%	1,422	18.10%	7,858
Bath	1,081	58.62%	417	22.61%	346	18.76%	664	36.01%	1,844
Bell	1,550	43.26%	1,797	50.15%	236	6.59%	−247	−6.89%	3,583
Boone	8,292	45.79%	9,160	50.59%	655	3.62%	−868	−4.79%	18,107
Bourbon	2,223	54.79%	906	22.33%	928	22.87%	1,295	31.92%	4,057
Boyd	4,879	62.82%	2,617	33.69%	271	3.49%	2,262	29.12%	7,767
Boyle	3,476	54.94%	1,839	29.07%	1,012	15.99%	1,637	25.87%	6,327
Bracken	758	55.25%	510	37.17%	104	7.58%	248	18.08%	1,372
Breathitt	1,236	55.23%	711	31.77%	291	13.00%	525	23.46%	2,238
Breckinridge	2,376	58.55%	1,495	36.84%	187	4.61%	881	21.71%	4,058
Bullitt	7,370	53.38%	5,656	40.96%	781	5.66%	1,714	12.41%	13,807
Butler	938	43.19%	1,140	52.49%	94	4.33%	−202	−9.30%	2,172
Caldwell	2,075	60.11%	1,157	33.52%	220	6.37%	918	26.59%	3,452
Calloway	3,914	57.87%	2,567	37.95%	283	4.18%	1,347	19.91%	6,764
Campbell	8,320	52.80%	6,780	43.02%	659	4.18%	1,540	9.77%	15,759
Carlisle	758	54.22%	575	41.13%	65	4.65%	183	13.09%	1,398
Carroll	1,176	66.55%	480	27.16%	111	6.28%	696	39.39%	1,767
Carter	2,466	63.89%	1,216	31.50%	178	4.61%	1,250	32.38%	3,860
Casey	1,038	36.89%	1,522	54.09%	254	9.03%	−484	−17.20%	2,814
Christian	3,582	48.69%	3,455	46.97%	319	4.34%	127	1.73%	7,356
Clark	3,966	51.61%	2,255	29.34%	1,464	19.05%	1,711	22.26%	7,685
Clay	1,010	35.35%	1,602	56.07%	245	8.58%	−592	−20.72%	2,857
Clinton	514	24.18%	1,540	72.44%	72	3.39%	−1,026	−48.26%	2,126
Crittenden	942	45.57%	1,020	49.35%	105	5.08%	−78	−3.77%	2,067
Cumberland	374	17.99%	1,629	78.35%	76	3.66%	−1,255	−60.37%	2,079
Daviess	11,579	58.96%	7,302	37.18%	758	3.86%	4,277	21.78%	19,639
Edmonson	1,067	46.27%	1,166	50.56%	73	3.17%	−99	−4.29%	2,306
Elliott	1,460	73.15%	392	19.64%	144	7.21%	1,068	53.51%	1,996
Estill	1,000	39.92%	1,048	41.84%	457	18.24%	−48	−1.92%	2,505
Fayette	32,948	54.73%	14,123	23.46%	13,131	21.81%	18,825	31.27%	60,202
Fleming	1,653	53.84%	979	31.89%	438	14.27%	674	21.95%	3,070
Floyd	4,208	63.56%	1,790	27.04%	623	9.41%	2,418	36.52%	6,621
Franklin	9,896	59.61%	2,686	16.18%	4,020	24.21%	5,876	35.39%	16,602
Fulton	667	57.11%	454	38.87%	47	4.02%	213	18.24%	1,168
Gallatin	607	56.89%	403	37.77%	57	5.34%	204	19.12%	1,067
Garrard	1,373	41.91%	1,252	38.22%	651	19.87%	121	3.69%	3,276
Grant	1,621	49.97%	1,422	43.83%	201	6.20%	199	6.13%	3,244
Graves	4,292	54.36%	3,158	39.99%	446	5.65%	1,134	14.36%	7,896
Grayson	2,306	52.04%	1,891	42.68%	234	5.28%	415	9.37%	4,431
Green	1,213	48.68%	1,137	45.63%	142	5.70%	76	3.05%	2,492
Greenup	3,895	60.72%	2,286	35.64%	234	3.65%	1,609	25.08%	6,415
Hancock	1,164	62.72%	600	32.33%	92	4.96%	564	30.39%	1,856
Hardin	10,722	57.82%	6,885	37.13%	937	5.05%	3,837	20.69%	18,544
Harlan	1,712	47.18%	1,621	44.67%	296	8.16%	91	2.51%	3,629
Harrison	1,982	51.14%	1,158	29.88%	736	18.99%	824	21.26%	3,876
Hart	1,909	59.69%	1,122	35.08%	167	5.22%	787	24.61%	3,198
Henderson	5,593	68.70%	2,326	28.57%	222	2.73%	3,267	40.13%	8,141
Henry	2,338	58.82%	1,185	29.81%	452	11.37%	1,153	29.01%	3,975
Hickman	682	57.65%	450	38.04%	51	4.31%	232	19.61%	1,183
Hopkins	6,084	66.83%	2,666	29.28%	354	3.89%	3,418	37.54%	9,104
Jackson	537	24.95%	1,404	65.24%	211	9.80%	−867	−40.29%	2,152
Jefferson	107,871	66.95%	44,192	27.43%	9,048	5.62%	63,679	39.52%	161,111
Jessamine	4,045	40.59%	3,686	36.99%	2,234	22.42%	359	3.60%	9,965
Johnson	1,668	47.97%	1,560	44.87%	249	7.16%	108	3.11%	3,477
Kenton	13,326	50.89%	11,818	45.13%	1,042	3.98%	1,508	5.76%	26,186
Knott	1,422	51.84%	1,082	39.45%	239	8.71%	340	12.40%	2,743
Knox	2,368	49.96%	2,048	43.21%	324	6.84%	320	6.75%	4,740
Larue	1,686	57.35%	1,075	36.56%	179	6.09%	611	20.78%	2,940
Laurel	3,710	39.91%	4,858	52.26%	728	7.83%	−1,148	−12.35%	9,296
Lawrence	1,270	54.27%	952	40.68%	118	5.04%	318	13.59%	2,340
Lee	482	36.71%	594	45.24%	237	18.05%	−112	−8.53%	1,313
Leslie	607	30.97%	1,246	63.57%	107	5.46%	−639	−32.60%	1,960
Letcher	1,810	50.81%	1,366	38.35%	386	10.84%	444	12.46%	3,562
Lewis	765	42.95%	917	51.49%	99	5.56%	−152	−8.53%	1,781
Lincoln	2,018	47.74%	1,633	38.63%	576	13.63%	385	9.11%	4,227
Livingston	1,366	58.33%	828	35.35%	148	6.32%	538	22.97%	2,342
Logan	1,951	52.67%	1,612	43.52%	141	3.81%	339	9.15%	3,704
Lyon	1,366	59.42%	802	34.88%	131	5.70%	564	24.53%	2,299
Madison	7,804	49.86%	5,090	32.52%	2,759	17.63%	2,714	17.34%	15,653
Magoffin	1,476	59.90%	829	33.64%	159	6.45%	647	26.26%	2,464
Marion	2,929	72.92%	738	18.37%	350	8.71%	2,191	54.54%	4,017
Marshall	4,639	56.09%	3,183	38.49%	448	5.42%	1,456	17.61%	8,270
Martin	414	35.17%	700	59.47%	63	5.35%	−286	−24.30%	1,177
Mason	1,862	59.22%	1,054	33.52%	228	7.25%	808	25.70%	3,144
McCracken	7,341	52.39%	5,940	42.39%	731	5.22%	1,401	10.00%	14,012
McCreary	639	32.79%	1,206	61.88%	104	5.34%	−567	−29.09%	1,949
McLean	1,372	66.73%	625	30.40%	59	2.87%	747	36.33%	2,056
Meade	3,228	59.27%	1,901	34.91%	317	5.82%	1,327	24.37%	5,446
Menifee	703	57.91%	346	28.50%	165	13.59%	357	29.41%	1,214
Mercer	2,745	50.65%	1,664	30.70%	1,011	18.65%	1,081	19.94%	5,420
Metcalfe	1,187	54.80%	851	39.29%	128	5.91%	336	15.51%	2,166
Monroe	883	30.50%	1,925	66.49%	87	3.01%	−1,042	−35.99%	2,895
Montgomery	2,612	53.31%	1,393	28.43%	895	18.27%	1,219	24.88%	4,900
Morgan	1,220	57.63%	629	29.71%	268	12.66%	591	27.92%	2,117
Muhlenberg	3,859	69.44%	1,528	27.50%	170	3.06%	2,331	41.95%	5,557
Nelson	5,575	62.16%	2,809	31.32%	585	6.52%	2,766	30.84%	8,969
Nicholas	661	46.98%	280	19.90%	466	33.12%	195	13.86%	1,407
Ohio	2,266	53.81%	1,773	42.10%	172	4.08%	493	11.71%	4,211
Oldham	7,079	50.27%	6,082	43.19%	922	6.55%	997	7.08%	14,083
Owen	1,279	51.18%	807	32.29%	413	16.53%	472	18.89%	2,499
Owsley	286	37.53%	388	50.92%	88	11.55%	−102	−13.39%	762
Pendleton	1,159	53.66%	881	40.79%	120	5.56%	278	12.87%	2,160
Perry	2,092	46.70%	2,006	44.78%	382	8.53%	86	1.92%	4,480
Pike	5,261	57.87%	3,217	35.39%	613	6.74%	2,044	22.48%	9,091
Powell	1,712	55.91%	792	25.87%	558	18.22%	920	30.05%	3,062
Pulaski	4,825	39.82%	6,274	51.77%	1,019	8.41%	−1,449	−11.96%	12,118
Robertson	229	53.01%	135	31.25%	68	15.74%	94	21.76%	432
Rockcastle	948	33.62%	1,506	53.40%	366	12.98%	−558	−19.79%	2,820
Rowan	2,308	61.03%	1,028	27.18%	446	11.79%	1,280	33.84%	3,782
Russell	1,783	41.16%	2,240	51.71%	309	7.13%	−457	−10.55%	4,332
Scott	5,241	52.81%	2,843	28.64%	1,841	18.55%	2,398	24.16%	9,925
Shelby	5,516	53.65%	3,744	36.42%	1,021	9.93%	1,772	17.24%	10,281
Simpson	1,325	55.37%	994	41.54%	74	3.09%	331	13.83%	2,393
Spencer	2,093	51.55%	1,646	40.54%	321	7.91%	447	11.01%	4,060
Taylor	3,139	54.00%	2,292	39.43%	382	6.57%	847	14.57%	5,813
Todd	814	47.16%	841	48.73%	71	4.11%	−27	−1.56%	1,726
Trigg	1,422	46.46%	1,500	49.00%	139	4.54%	−78	−2.55%	3,061
Trimble	1,008	59.61%	587	34.71%	96	5.68%	421	24.90%	1,691
Union	1,973	72.40%	676	24.81%	76	2.79%	1,297	47.60%	2,725
Warren	10,676	54.12%	8,107	41.10%	942	4.78%	2,569	13.02%	19,725
Washington	1,607	56.27%	965	33.79%	284	9.94%	642	22.48%	2,856
Wayne	1,710	47.06%	1,740	47.88%	184	5.06%	−30	−0.83%	3,634
Webster	1,885	69.61%	731	26.99%	92	3.40%	1,154	42.61%	2,708
Whitley	2,921	42.15%	3,535	51.01%	474	6.84%	−614	−8.86%	6,930
Wolfe	780	58.91%	348	26.28%	196	14.80%	432	32.63%	1,324
Woodford	3,632	51.32%	1,674	23.65%	1,771	25.02%	1,861	26.30%	7,077
TOTALS	464,245	55.72%	294,034	35.29%	74,860	8.99%	170,211	20.43%	833,139

==== Counties that flipped from Republican to Democratic ====
- Garrard (largest city: Lancaster)
- Grayson (largest city: Leitchfield)
- Green (largest city: Greensburg)
- Jessamine (largest city: Nicholasville)
- Knox (largest city: Barbourville)
- Lincoln (largest city: Stanford)
- Oldham (largest city: La Grange)
- Taylor (largest city: Campbellsville)

==== Counties that flipped from Democratic to Republican ====
- Bell (largest city: Middlesboro)
- Crittenden (largest city: Marion)
- Edmonson (largest city: Brownsville)
- Leslie (largest city: Hyden)
- Martin (largest city: Inez)
- Owsley (largest city: Booneville)
- Todd (largest city: Elkton)
- Trigg (largest city: Cadiz)

==== By congressional district ====
Beshear won all six congressional districts, including four that were represented by Republicans.

District	Beshear	Williams	Galbraith	Representative
1st	54%	41%	5%	Ed Whitfield
2nd	57%	38%	6%	Brett Guthrie
3rd	67%	27%	6%	John Yarmuth
4th	53%	40%	6%	Geoff Davis
5th	47%	44%	8%	Hal Rogers
6th	53%	26%	21%	Ben Chandler

== See also ==
- 2011 United States elections
- 2011 United States gubernatorial elections
