= J. Ed Morgan =

American politician

Member of the Mississippi State Senate from the 45th district
- In office 2004–2008
- Preceded by: Ron Farris
- Succeeded by: Billy Hudson

Mayor of Hattiesburg
- In office July 1989 – July 2001
- Preceded by: G. D. Williamson
- Succeeded by: Johnny DuPree

Personal details
- Born: J. Ed Morgan; November 1, 1947 (age 78)
- Party: Republican
- Children: 4
- Education: University of Alabama; Mississippi College
- Occupation: Politician

J. Ed Morgan (born November 1, 1947) is an American politician who served in the Mississippi State Senate from the 45th district from 2004 until 2008.

== Education and professional career ==
Morgan attended University of Alabama and Jackson School of Law at Mississippi College. His professional background is in construction.

== Political career ==
Morgan was mayor of Hattiesburg, MS from 1989 until 2001.

Morgan served as a member of the Mississippi Senate from 2004 to 2008. As a Senator, Morgan served on the Fees, Salaries & Administration, Finance Judiciary, Division B, Ports and Marine Resources, Public Health & Welfare and Universities & Colleges committees.

== Personal life ==
Morgan has four children.
