= 2011 Louisiana gubernatorial election =

- October 22, 2011
- Turnout: 32.8%
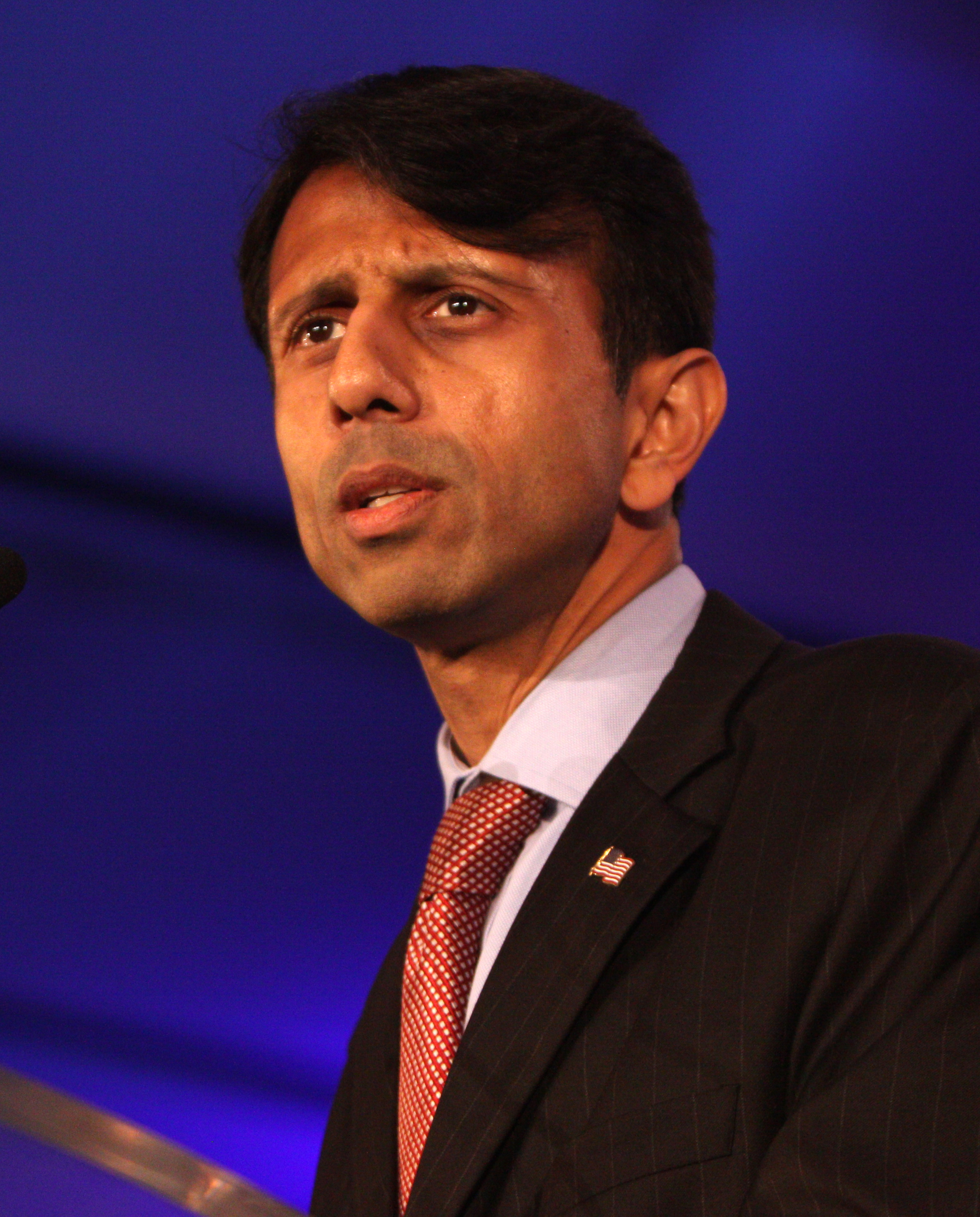

Nominee	Bobby Jindal	Tara Hollis
Party	Republican	Democratic
Popular vote	673,239	182,925
Percentage	65.80%	17.88%
- Parish results Jindal: 30–40% 40–50% 50–60% 60–70% 70–80% 80–90%
Governor before election
Bobby Jindal
Republican
Elected Governor
Bobby Jindal
Republican

The 2011 Louisiana gubernatorial election was held on October 22 with 10 candidates competing in a nonpartisan blanket primary. Incumbent Republican Bobby Jindal won a second term. Since he won an outright majority of the vote in the blanket primary, a runoff election that would have otherwise occurred on November 19 was unnecessary. This was the last time until 2023 that a Republican was elected governor of Louisiana and that a Louisiana governor election was decided without a runoff.

== Background ==
Elections in Louisiana, with the exception of U.S. presidential elections (and congressional races in 2008 and 2010), follow a variation of the open primary system called the jungle primary. Candidates of any and all parties are listed on one ballot; voters need not limit themselves to the candidates of one party. Unless one candidate takes more than 50% of the vote in the first round, a run-off election is then held between the top two candidates, who may in fact be members of the same party. This scenario occurred in the 7th District congressional race in 1996, when Democrats Chris John and Hunter Lundy made the runoff for the open seat, and in 1999, when Republicans Suzanne Haik Terrell and Woody Jenkins made the runoff for Commissioner of Elections.

== Candidates ==
On December 10, 2008, Jindal indicated that he would not run for president in 2012, saying he would focus on his reelection and that this would make transitioning to a national campaign difficult, though he later attempted to leave himself the opportunity to change his mind in the future.

Minister Dan Northcutt (I) was the only declared challenger to Jindal, but he eventually dropped out of the race. On October 22, Caroline Fayard's name surfaced on talk-radio program Think Tank with Garland Robinette, as a potential competitor for Jindal in his reelection campaign. The discussants cited Jindal's high approval ratings and already in-the-bank $7 million campaign fund as unapproachable assets for Democrats other than Fayard, who at the time of the program was seeking the office of lieutenant governor in a special election runoff against Republican secretary of state Jay Dardenne.

=== Republicans ===
- Bobby Jindal, incumbent Governor

=== Democrats ===
==== Announced ====
- Cary Deaton, attorney
- Tara Hollis, special education teacher
- Androniki "Niki Bird" Papazoglakis, director for Baton Rouge-based victim advocacy group
- Ivo "Trey" Roberts, high school teacher

==== Declined ====
- Al Ater, former Louisiana secretary of state
- Kathleen Blanco, former governor
- Caroline Fayard, attorney and 2010 Democratic nominee for lieutenant governor of Louisiana
- John Georges, businessman, 2007 Independent candidate for governor, unsuccessful candidate for Mayor of New Orleans in 2010
- Robert M. Marionneaux, state senator

==== Ineligible ====
- Edwin Edwards, former four-term governor. Wanted to contest election following 10-year prison term for racketeering and illegally selling casino licenses, but was not pardoned

=== Libertarian ===
- Scott Lewis, former candidate for Louisiana secretary of state

=== Independents ===
- David Blanchard, former employee of the Louisiana Department of Health and Hospitals
- Leonard "Lenny" Bollingham, Computer Engineer & Businessman
- Ron Caesar
- William Robert "Bob" Lang, unsuccessful candidate for the U.S. Senate in 2010

=== Dropped out ===
- Dan Northcutt, minister

== General election ==
=== Predictions ===
Source	Ranking	As of
Rothenberg Political Report	Safe R	November 4, 2011
Governing	Safe R	November 4, 2011
Cook Political Report	Safe R	November 4, 2011
Sabato's Crystal Ball	Safe R	November 4, 2011

=== Results ===
Louisiana gubernatorial election results, 2011
Party	Candidate	Votes	%
Republican	Bobby Jindal (incumbent)	673,239	65.80
Democratic	Tara Hollis	182,925	17.88
Democratic	Cary Deaton	50,071	4.89
Democratic	Trey Roberts	33,280	3.25
Independent	David Blanchard	26,705	2.61
Democratic	Niki Bird Papazoglakis	21,885	2.14
Libertarian	Scott Lewis	12,528	1.22
Independent	Bob Lang	9,109	0.89
Independent	Ron Ceasar	8,179	0.8
Independent	Lenny Bollingham	5,242	0.51
Total votes		1,023,163	100
Turnout			35.9%
Republican hold			

== See also ==
- 2011 United States gubernatorial elections
- Governors of Louisiana
