= Senator Ferris (disambiguation) =

Woodbridge N. Ferris (1853–1928) was a U.S. Senator from Michigan from 1923 to 1928. Senator Ferris may also refer to:

- Grey Ferris (1946–2008), Mississippi State Senate
- Jeannie Ferris (1941–2007), Senate of Australia
- Joshua Beal Ferris (1804–1886), Connecticut State Senate
- Michael Ferris (politician) (1931–2000), Senate of Ireland
- Mortimer Y. Ferris (1881–1941), New York State Senate

== See also ==
- Senator Farris (disambiguation)
