= Hudson Holliday =

American politician (born 1944)

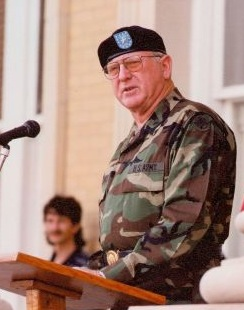
Hudson Holliday

Pearl River County Supervisor
- Incumbent
- Assumed office November 6, 2007

Personal details
- Born: September 24, 1944 (age 82) Poplarville, Mississippi
- Party: Republican
- Spouse: Paulette Kirkland Holliday
- Website: Official Website

Military service
- Branch/service: Mississippi National Guard
- Years of service: 39
- Rank: Major General

Laughlin Hudson Holliday (born September 24, 1944) is a two-star General from Poplarville, Mississippi. Holliday is currently serving as a Pearl River County Supervisor and was a candidate for governor of Mississippi in 2011.

== Education ==
Holliday graduated from Poplarville public schools, Pearl River Community College and University of Southern Mississippi with a degree in Business Administration. In 1995, he graduated from the U. S. Army War College and in 2005 was inducted into the Fort Benning, Georgia Officer Candidate School (OCS) Hall of Fame.

== Career ==
Holliday worked in oil fields and mechanic shops during the summer while in college, and since graduating has been involved in a wide variety of jobs in farming, timber harvesting, home building, heavy construction, law enforcement, real estate development, soldiering, and even crop dusting with an airplane. Upon completing basic training in the Mississippi Army National Guard, he worked for the Boeing Company on the Saturn Project, starting as a methods analyst and rising to be the administrative assistant to the manager of Industrial Engineering/Production Control. When the Saturn program ended, he enrolled in OCS at Fort Benning, Georgia, graduating as a 2nd Lt. In addition to being a county supervisor, he is involved in the restoration of wetlands.

== Personal life ==
He and his wife, have three children and two grandchildren. They are members of the United Methodist Church. Holliday's interests include government, restoring old cars, flying airplanes, and riding motorcycles.
