= 2010 Louisiana state elections =

2010 Louisiana elections

== Federal ==
Elections for federal offices, as in the rest of the country, occurred on November 2. The primaries were held on August 28 with a runoff for the Republican U.S. House nomination occurring on October 2 in Louisiana's 3rd congressional district (no other primaries went to a runoff).

=== United States Congress ===
Louisiana's Class III U.S. Senate seat and all seven U.S. House seats were up for election.

==== United States Senate ====
Senator David Vitter (R) sought re-election. Vitter overcame intraparty opposition in the August primary and was opposed in the General election by U.S. Representative Charlie Melancon (D).

==== United States House of Representatives ====
Six of the seven members of Louisiana's House delegation sought re-election. Both before and after the elections, Republicans held six of Louisiana's U.S. House seats while Democrats held one seat, but the lone Democratic seat changed from the Louisiana's 2nd congressional district to the 3rd. Many political prognosticators regarded the races in the Second and Third districts as the most competitive.

== State ==
The State of Louisiana usually holds its general elections for state offices in post-midterm off-years. Elections for state and local offices, unlike federal elections, are conducted under the jungle primary (also known as nonpartisan blanket primary) format and are usually held in mid-October.

Besides various local elections and special elections legislative seats and other positions, ballots in Louisiana during 2010 concerned a special election for lieutenant governor, for the judiciary, and for certain referendums (including amendments to the state constitution) and other measures.

=== Judiciary ===
The Louisiana judicial elections of 2010 consisted of multiple dates. There were elections on February 6 (for one Louisiana District Courts seat), March 27 (three District Court seats), August 28, 2010 (political primary, no judges on ballot), and October 2 (in which one Louisiana Supreme Court seat and thirteen Louisiana Courts of Appeal seats were up for election). Judicial elections in Louisiana are conducted with the political party affiliation of the candidate indicated on the ballot.

=== Ballot measures ===
Numerous measures were on the ballots on October 2 and November 2.
