= Ron Farris =

American politician

Member of the Mississippi State Senate from the 45th district
- In office 1996–2004
- Succeeded by: J. Ed Morgan

Personal details
- Party: Republican
- Education: University of Southern Mississippi
- Occupation: Attorney

Ronald D. Farris is an American politician who served in the Mississippi State Senate from the 45th district from 1996 until 2004.

Farris graduated from University of Southern Mississippi and University of Mississippi. He is currently an attorney with Farris Law Group, PLLC in Madison, MS.

Farris is married to his wife Lisa and has children.
