= Johnny DuPree =

American politician (born 1953)

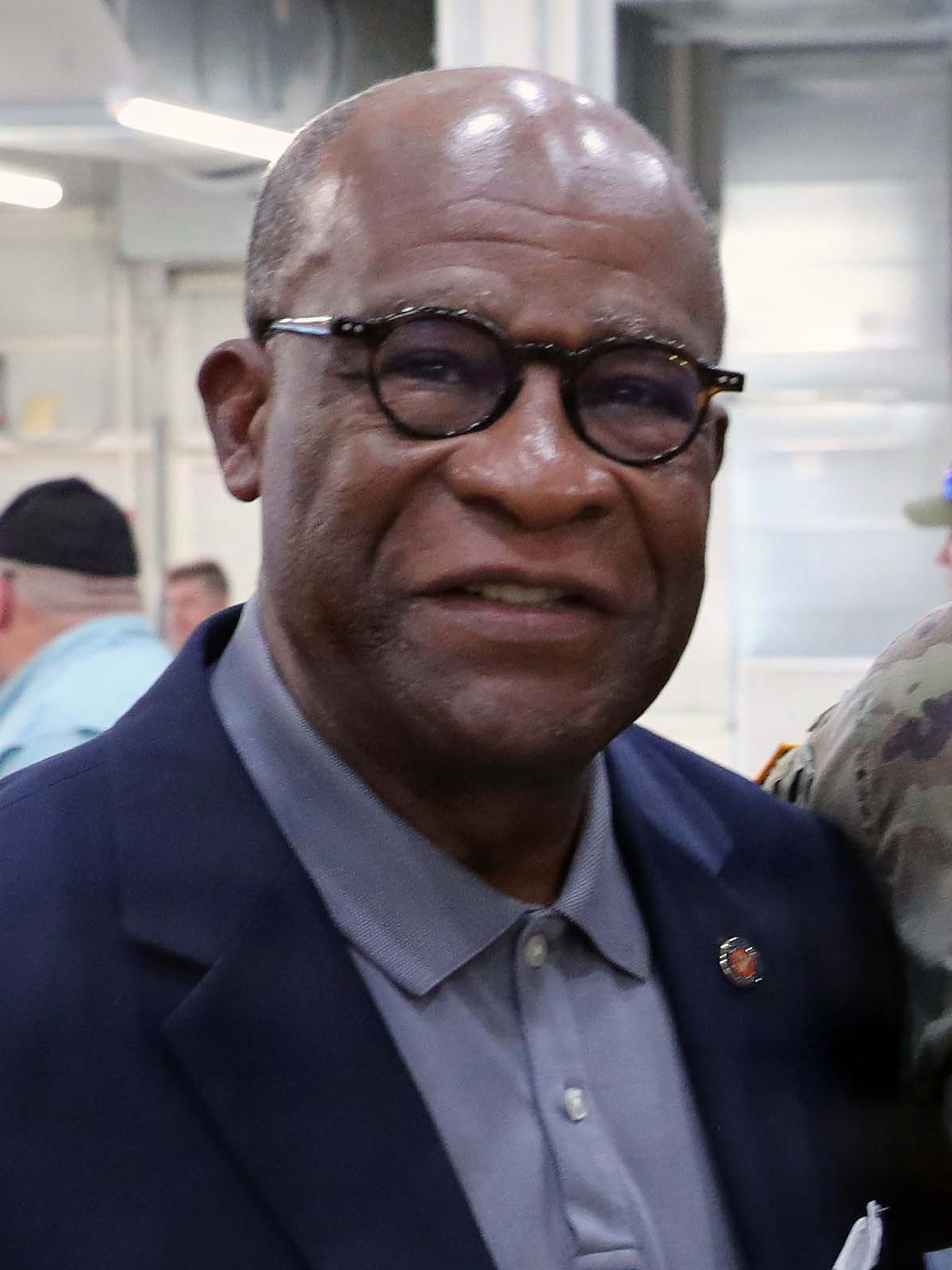
- DuPree in 2026

Member of the Mississippi State Senate from the 45th district
- Incumbent
- Assumed office January 6, 2026
- Preceded by: Chris Johnson (redistricted)

Mayor of Hattiesburg
- In office July 2001 – July 3, 2017
- Preceded by: J. Ed Morgan
- Succeeded by: Toby Barker

Personal details
- Born: November 18, 1953 (age 72) Fort Benning, Georgia, U.S.
- Party: Democratic
- Spouse: Johniece DuPree (m. 1972)
- Children: 2 daughters
- Education: Jones County Junior College (attended); University of Southern Mississippi (BS, MS); Jackson State University (PhD)
- Website: Campaign website

Johnny DuPree (born November 18, 1953) is an American politician and Democratic member of the Mississippi Senate for the 45th district. DuPree notably served as the first African-American mayor of Hattiesburg, Mississippi from 2001 to 2017. He was the Democratic Party's nominee for Governor of Mississippi in 2011, the first African-American major party nominee for governor in Mississippi since the Reconstruction era. He was also its nominee for Secretary of State of Mississippi in 2019, and its nominee for Congress in Mississippi's 4th congressional district for the 2022 midterm elections.

== Early life and education ==
Johnny DuPree was born in Fort Benning, Georgia. As a small boy, he moved to Hattiesburg, Mississippi, with his mother, brother, and sister.

DuPree has bachelor's and master's degrees from the University of Southern Mississippi, and a PhD from Jackson State University. He is a member of Omega Psi Phi fraternity.

== Career ==
DuPree entered public service in 1987 when he was appointed to the Hattiesburg Public School Board. A year later, he and his wife established a small real estate business. In 1991, he was elected to the Forrest County Board of Supervisors, where he served for 10 years before running for mayor of Hattiesburg in 2001.

== Mayor of Hattiesburg ==
In 2001, DuPree became the first African-American mayor of Hattiesburg, after winning 53% of the vote. He was re-elected in 2005 and 2009. During his first campaign for mayor, DuPree ran on a platform of shoring up education and protecting small business. At the time, Robert Ingram, the executive director of economic development at the University of Southern Mississippi, predicted that DuPree would support locally owned small business while also being active in industrial recruitment.

Despite damage to the city resulting from Hurricane Katrina in 2005, and a global recession in 2008, the health of Hattiesburg's small businesses remained steady during DuPree's tenure as mayor. Ingram's predictions for Hattiesburg under the DuPree administration were largely accurate. In 2010, employment statistics showed Hattiesburg registering only 8.6 percent unemployment at a time when the rate in the state was 11.2 and the national rate was 11.1. Also during DuPree's tenure as mayor, annual crime statistics released by the Hattiesburg Police Department showed a 10 percent overall decrease in reported crime since 2008.

=== Response to Katrina ===
On the Sunday before Hurricane Katrina hit the Gulf Coast in 2005, DuPree was invited to address the congregation of Mt Carmel Baptist Church, where he warned the congregation about the "devastation churning its way across the Gulf of Mexico." In the aftermath of the storm, the city lost power and water for several days. DuPree told residents to expect no tap water for one or two days, and no power for two weeks. Due to the lack of a response from the Federal Emergency Management Agency (FEMA), the city under DuPree resorted to leasing essential equipment and goods on its own, items such as generators, which would normally be available through federal and state emergency services.

Because of Hattiesburg's position as a regional hub and as the first major metropolitan area outside of New Orleans, the city was flooded with thousands of evacuees. In the immediate aftermath of the storm, DuPree's government worked to meet the needs of the displaced evacuees without assistance from federal agencies.

In the weeks following Katrina, DuPree was a vocal critic of FEMA's inept performance and perceived indifference. Although the federal response to the Katrina disaster resulted in many high-profile accusations of racism, DuPree was among those who emphasized the role of income disparity. He also stated that "those charged with providing to those in need simply failed when called upon."

== Elections ==
In the Democratic primary of the 2011 Mississippi gubernatorial election, DuPree faced businessman and future Clarksdale mayor Bill Luckett and two minor candidates. Despite a significant fundraising disadvantage, on August 23, 2011, DuPree defeated Luckett by 179,748 votes (43.6%) to 161,833 (39.2%). He lost to Republican nominee Phil Bryant in the general election on November 8, 2011.

In his 2013 mayoral re-election bid, DuPree faced fourth ward councilman Dave Ware, a Republican who ran as an independent, along with three minor candidates. In the June 4 election, DuPree was believed to be the winner by 37 votes out of over 9,600 cast, but concerns were raised about possible voter fraud, eligibility of some voters, and the fact that the city clerk left ballots unsecured in city hall the night before the election. Ware filed an election challenge on June 24, and a special judge was appointed by the state Supreme Court to hear the case. The jury initially found in favor of Ware in a 9–3 vote, the bare minimum for a verdict, however after Judge William Coleman polled the jurors, the count shifted to 8-4 and a mistrial was declared.

After a new election was ordered, another dispute arose over choosing replacements for two election commissioners who resigned. Ultimately, a clean slate of commissioners was chosen to oversee the special election. On election day, one precinct's ballot box was returned unsealed and, despite state law stating boxes must be locked and sealed at the precinct, the ballots were counted anyway. In the end, DuPree again narrowly bested Ware, this time by a margin of 217 votes.

In 2017, DuPree was defeated in a bid for a fifth consecutive term as mayor, losing to Toby Barker, a Republican member of the state House of Representatives, who ran as an independent.

In 2019, DuPree ran for Secretary of State of Mississippi and won the Democratic nomination in August. He lost the November 2019 general election to Republican candidate Michael Watson.

In 2021, DuPree announced his candidacy for Mississippi's 4th congressional district in the 2022 midterm elections. He lost to Mike Ezell.

== Mississippi Senate ==
After a court-mandated, mid-decennial reapportionment, DuPree was elected to the Mississippi Senate in November 2025, defeating Republican candidate Anna Rush, in order to gain a seat that was previously held by the incumbent Chris Johnson. DuPree's win, along with another Democratic victory the same night, broke the Republican supermajority in the Mississippi Senate for the first time in six years.

== Personal life ==
DuPree has been married to Johniece since 1972. They have two daughters, April and Monica and two grandsons, Chandler DuPree Taylor and Chesney DuPree Taylor. As of 2011, his older daughter, April DuPree Taylor (Coustaur Taylor), worked at the Department of Communication at the University of South Alabama, and his younger daughter, Monica DuPree, was an educator in the Hattiesburg Public School District.

Party political offices
Preceded by John Arthur Eaves Jr.	Democratic nominee for Governor of Mississippi; 2011	Succeeded by Robert Gray
Preceded by Charles Graham	Democratic nominee for Secretary of State of Mississippi; 2019	Succeeded by Shuwaski Young
