= 2011 Greensboro mayoral election =

Greensboro mayoral election, 2011
- November 8, 2011
Candidate	Robbie Perkins	Bill Knight
Party	Nonpartisan	Nonpartisan
Popular vote	20,975	15,803
Percentage	64.89%	48.89%
Mayor before election
Bill Knight
Elected mayor
Robbie Perkins

The 2011 Greensboro mayoral election was held on November 8, 2011, to elect the mayor of Greensboro, North Carolina. It saw the election of Robbie Perkins, who unseated incumbent mayor Bill Knight.

== Results ==
=== Primary ===
The date of the primary was October 11.

Primary results
Candidate	Votes	%
Robbie Perkins	9,436	47.95
Bill Knight (incumbent)	6,631	33.70
Tom Phillips	2,169	11.02
Christ Phillips	751	3.82
Write ins	690	3.51
Total votes	19,677	

=== General election ===
General election results
Candidate	Votes	%
Robbie Perkins	20,975	64.89
Bill Knight (incumbent)	15,803	48.89
Write ins	162	0.00
Total votes	36,940	
