= Phil Bryant =

American politician (born 1954)

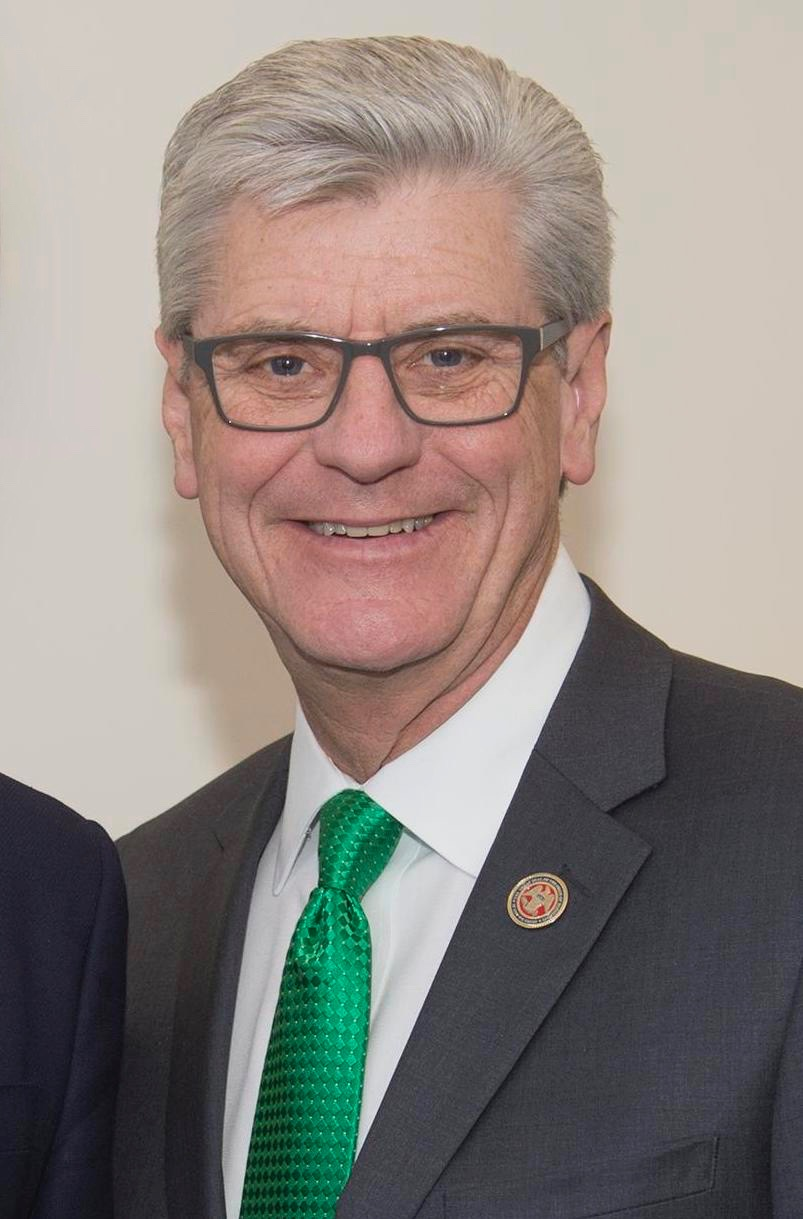
- Bryant in 2017

64th Governor of Mississippi
- In office January 10, 2012 – January 14, 2020
- Lieutenant: Tate Reeves
- Preceded by: Haley Barbour
- Succeeded by: Tate Reeves

31st Lieutenant Governor of Mississippi
- In office January 10, 2008 – January 10, 2012
- Governor: Haley Barbour
- Preceded by: Amy Tuck
- Succeeded by: Tate Reeves

40th Auditor of Mississippi
- In office November 1996 – January 10, 2008
- Governor: Kirk Fordice; Ronnie Musgrove; Haley Barbour
- Preceded by: Steve Patterson
- Succeeded by: Stacey Pickering

Personal details
- Born: Dewey Phillip Bryant; December 9, 1954 (age 71) Moorhead, Mississippi, U.S.
- Party: Republican
- Spouse: Deborah Hays (m. 1976)
- Children: 2
- Education: Hinds Community College (attended); University of Southern Mississippi (BA); Mississippi College (MA)

Dewey Phillip Bryant (born December 9, 1954) is an American politician who served as the 64th governor of Mississippi from 2012 to 2020. A member of the Republican Party, he was the 31st lieutenant governor of Mississippi from 2008 to 2012 and 40th state auditor of Mississippi from 1996 to 2008. Bryant was elected governor in 2011, defeating the Democratic nominee Mayor Johnny DuPree of Hattiesburg. He was re-elected in 2015, defeating Democratic nominee Robert Gray.

== Early life and education ==
Dewey Phillip Bryant was born in Moorhead in Sunflower County in the Mississippi Delta. He is the son of Dewey C., a diesel mechanic, and Estelle R. Bryant, a mother who stayed home with her three boys. Bryant's family moved to the capital of Jackson, where his father worked for Jackson Mack Sales and was later service manager there.

Bryant attended Council McCluer High School his junior and senior years.

Bryant studied first at Hinds Community College and received a bachelor's degree in criminal justice from the University of Southern Mississippi and a master's degree in political science from Mississippi College in Clinton. He also received an Honorary Doctorate of Laws degree from Mississippi College, where he served as an adjunct professor teaching Mississippi political history, both before and during his first term as governor.

== Political career ==
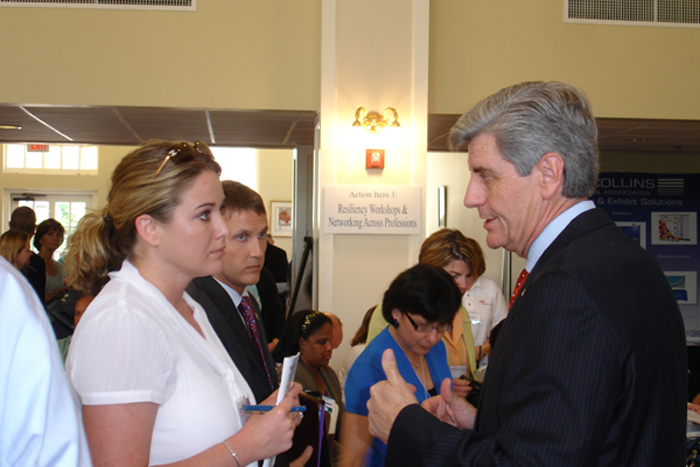
Bryant speaking with a constituent, 2008

Prior to entering government public service, Bryant was a deputy sheriff in Hinds County from 1976 to 1981; he worked undercover in drug law enforcement and also worked as an insurance claims investigator. After his election to the Mississippi House of Representatives, Bryant served as Vice Chairman of the House Insurance Committee. Notably, he sponsored the Capital Gains Tax Cut Act of 1992.

Bryant was appointed to serve as State Auditor by Governor Kirk Fordice following the resignation of Steve Patterson. He was sworn in on November 1, 1996. Bryant was subsequently elected to a full term as auditor in 1999 and reelected in 2003. That year he convinced the Mississippi State Legislature to grant law enforcement officers in the auditor's office's investigative division full powers of arrest.

In 2007, he was elected Lieutenant Governor of Mississippi, defeating the Democratic Party candidate, State Representative Jamie Franks.

In 2011, Bryant was elected Governor of Mississippi, defeating the Democratic nominee Johnny DuPree.

== Governor of Mississippi ==
=== 2011 election ===
Bryant won the Republican primary in the gubernatorial election in 2011. He defeated Democratic nominee Johnny DuPree on November 8, with 60.98 percent of the vote compared to DuPree's 39.02 percent.

=== First term ===
On January 10, 2012, Bryant was sworn in as the 64th Governor of Mississippi. Once inaugurated, Bryant signed into law a bill requiring doctors at abortion clinics to have admitting privileges at local hospitals in an attempt to "end abortion in Mississippi". At the time, the state had a single abortion clinic, served only by out-of-state doctors who lacked in-state admitting privileges.

==== Education ====
In 2012, Bryant presented an education policy framework titled "Framing Mississippi's Future". During the 2013 legislative session he signed into law several bills relating to education, including the Literacy Based Promotion Act (LBPA), the Pre-K Collaborative Act, the Mississippi Charter School Act and the Mississippi Student Religious Liberties Act, as well as expanding the Mississippi Dyslexia Therapy Scholarship program and reforming school accreditation. By 2022, the LBPA in particular was credited with sparking a rapid improvement in historically poor student performance in Mississippi and was nicknamed the "Mississippi Miracle".

=== 2015 re-election ===
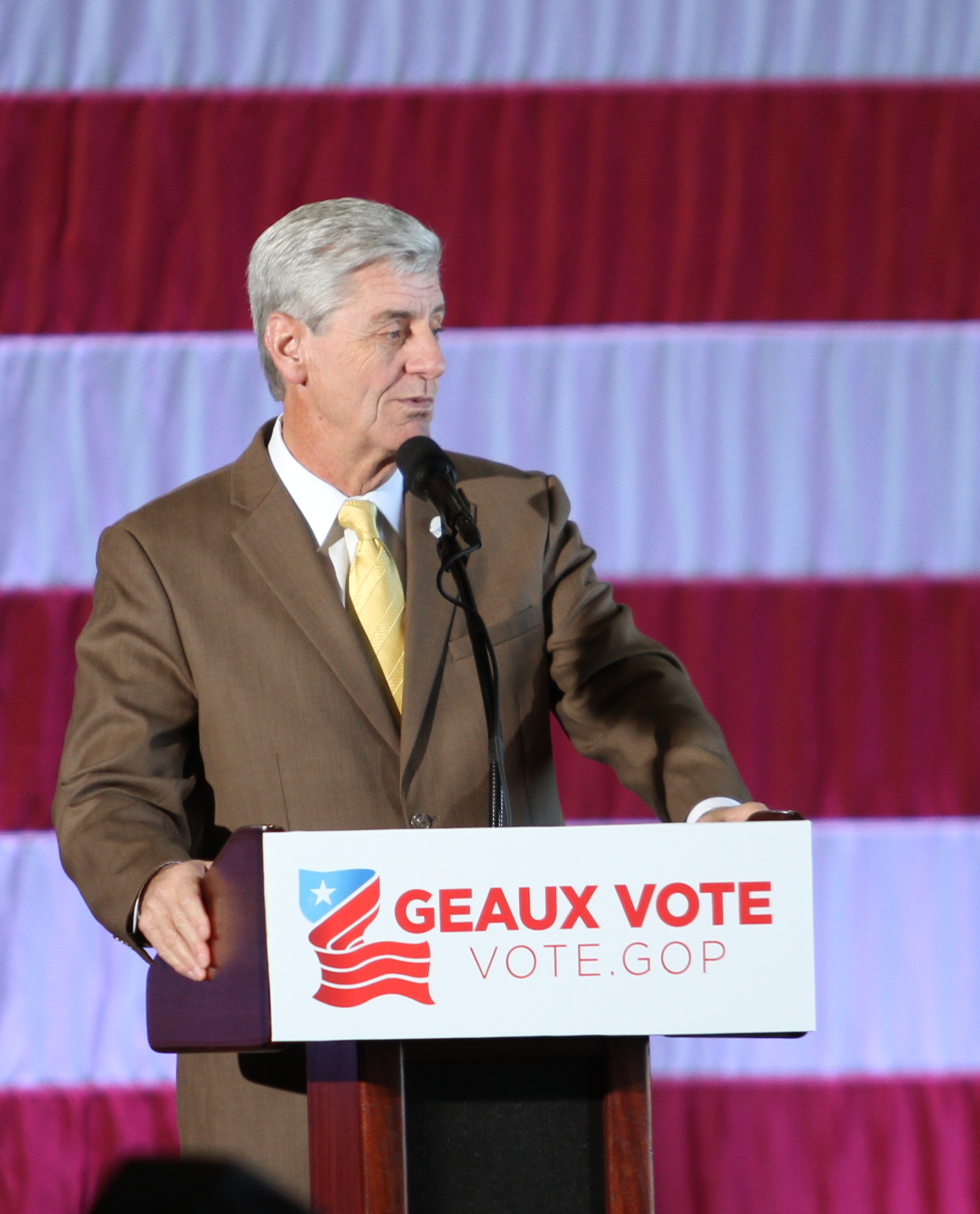
Bryant speaking at the Louisiana Republican Party "Geaux Vote" rally in December 2016

Bryant ran for re-election in 2015, facing off against Mitch Young in the Republican primary, carrying 91.7 percent of the vote. On November 5, Bryant faced the Democratic nominee, truck driver Robert Gray, winning with 66.2 percent of the vote. Because Mississippi is one of the eight U.S. states that have a two-term lifetime limit, he was ineligible to seek a third term in the 2019 gubernatorial election.

=== Second term ===
On April 5, 2016, Bryant signed HB-1523, which allows government employees and private businesses to cite religious beliefs to deny services to same-sex couples seeking a marriage license. The governor said on Twitter that HB-1523, "merely reinforces the rights which currently exist to the exercise of religious freedom as stated in the First Amendment to the U.S. Constitution."

Bryant announced on February 21, 2017, that he would make emergency budget cuts to most state agency budgets for the third time in the current fiscal year, having made similar cuts in the previous year because of the lack of projected revenue.

In January 2019, Bryant said he supported a bill to expand the use of civil forfeiture (the practice of seizing the property of individuals suspected of crimes even if they are not indicted or found guilty in court) so that assets valued up to $20,000 could be seized by law enforcement without the forfeiture going before a judge.

Investigative reporting during Bryant's second term that looked into Mississippi statewide public officials' misuse of political campaign funds showed that Bryant had not made payments to himself or utilized campaign credit cards for unrelated personal spending, and since 2012 had spent $2.6 million on his campaign with almost as much left over. The campaign fund was closed out with the majority of funds going to a political action committee, Imagine Mississippi PAC.

==== Abortion ====
In March 2018, the Mississippi Legislature passed the Gestational Age Act, which banned any abortion operation after the first 15 weeks of pregnancy, with exceptions for a medical emergency or severe fetal abnormality but none for cases of rape or incest. The medical emergency exception allows abortions to save the life of a pregnant woman and in situations where "the continuation of the pregnancy will create a serious risk of substantial and irreversible impairment of a major bodily function". The severe fetal abnormality exception allows abortions of fetuses whose defects will leave them incapable of living outside the womb.

The legislature justified this prohibition on the basis that abortions for nontherapeutic or elective reasons were "a barbaric practice, dangerous for the maternal patient, and demeaning to the medical profession". Another basis was that the abortion procedures forbidden under the Act were said by the legislature to carry "significant physical and psychological risks", and could cause various medical complications.

The legislation was based on a model written by Alliance Defending Freedom, a Christian conservative legal organization. The model legislation was created with the intent to make it law in the states within the traditionally conservative Fifth Circuit Court of Appeals (Louisiana, Mississippi, and Texas), and a means to bring abortion rights to the Supreme Court. Governor Phil Bryant signed the bill into law, saying he was "committed to making Mississippi the safest place in America for an unborn child, and this bill will help us achieve that goal". He added, "We'll probably be sued here in about a half hour, and that'll be fine with me. It is worth fighting over."

Bryant signed a law scheduled to go into effect on July 1, 2019, that would ban abortions later than six weeks of pregnancy. The Center for Reproductive Rights challenged the law. Because of his decision finding the prior less restrictive "15-week" law in the Currier case to be unconstitutional, Southern District of Mississippi Judge Carlton Reeves began his decision by referencing a prior law Bryant had signed and which Reeves had struck down in 2018. Judge Reeves wrote, "Here we go again. Mississippi has passed another law banning abortions prior to viability." He inquired, "Doesn't it boil down to six is less than fifteen?", adding that the new law "smacks of defiance to this court." Reeves noted that although there were exceptions for situations where the mother's life or health is endangered should pregnancy be taken to term, the law does not allow for exceptions in the cases of pregnancies resulting from rape or incest.

==== Welfare funds investigation and defamation suit ====
In January 2023, it was announced that Bryant was a potential target of the investigation into the Mississippi welfare funds scandal where over $77 million was misappropriated or stolen. The previous director of Mississippi's welfare agency, John Davis, who admitted to being involved and worked with authorities, was appointed by Bryant. No criminal charges were filed against Bryant and he stated that he had informed state auditor Shad White of concerns about "possible misspending of money from the Temporary Assistance for Needy Families antipoverty program" in 2019.

In July 2024, Bryant sued Mississippi Today, the outlet which broke the story, and its lead reporter, Anna Wolfe, alleging defamation. In May 2024, a Madison County Circuit Court judge ordered Mississippi Today to identify sources and produce information related to statements its staff made against Bryant. The outlet countered that the court order violated its constitutional rights under the First Amendment and appealed the decision to the Mississippi Supreme Court. Bryant's suit was dismissed in September 2025 on the grounds that Mississippi Today had engaged in constitutionally protected speech.

== Post-governorship ==
After leaving public office in 2019, Bryant became a founding member of BSS Global, a consulting firm.

In November 2025, Bryant was appointed by U.S. Secretary of Education Linda McMahon to the governing board of the National Assessment of Educational Progress.

== Electoral history ==
1999 Mississippi State Auditor election
Party	Candidate	Votes	%
Republican	Phil Bryant (inc.)	396,245	56.85
Democratic	Rod Nixon	300,729	43.15

2003 Mississippi State Auditor election
Party	Candidate	Votes	%
Republican	Phil Bryant (inc.)	587,212	76.31
Reform	Billy Blackburn	182,292	23.69

2007 Mississippi Lieutenant-Governor Republican primary election
Party	Candidate	Votes	%
Republican	Phil Bryant	112,140	57.1
Republican	Charlie Ross	84,110	42.9

2007 Mississippi Lieutenant-Governor election
Party	Candidate	Votes	%
Republican	Phil Bryant	431,747	58.57
Democratic	Jamie Franks Jr.	305,409	41.43

2011 Mississippi Republican gubernatorial primary election
Party	Candidate	Votes	%
Republican	Phil Bryant	172,300	59.46
Republican	Dave Dennis	74,546	25.72
Republican	Ron Williams	25,555	8.82
Republican	Hudson Holiday	13,761	4.75
Republican	James Broadwater	3,626	1.25

2011 Mississippi gubernatorial election
Party	Candidate	Votes	%
Republican	Phil Bryant	544,851	60.98
Democratic	Johnny DuPree	348,617	39.02

2015 Mississippi Republican gubernatorial primary election
Party	Candidate	Votes	%
Republican	Phil Bryant (inc.)	254,779	91.84
Republican	Mitch Young	22,628	8.16

2015 Mississippi gubernatorial election
Party	Candidate	Votes	%
Republican	Phil Bryant (inc.)	476,697	66.38
Democratic	Robert Gray	231,643	32.25
Reform	Shawn O'Hara	9,845	1.37

== Works cited ==
- Crockett, James R. (2007). Hands in the Till: Embezzlement of Public Monies in Mississippi. University Press of Mississippi. ISBN 9781578069354.

Political offices
Preceded by Steven Patterson	Auditor of Mississippi; 1996–2008	Succeeded by Stacey Pickering
Preceded by Amy Tuck	Lieutenant Governor of Mississippi; 2008–2012	Succeeded by Tate Reeves
Preceded by Haley Barbour	Governor of Mississippi; 2012–2020	Succeeded by Tate Reeves
Party political offices
Preceded by Ryan Hood	Republican nominee for Auditor of Mississippi; 1999, 2003	Succeeded by Stacey Pickering
Preceded by Amy Tuck	Republican nominee for Lieutenant Governor of Mississippi; 2007	Succeeded by Tate Reeves
Preceded by Haley Barbour	Republican nominee for Governor of Mississippi; 2011, 2015	Succeeded by Tate Reeves
U.S. order of precedence (ceremonial)
Preceded by Haley Barbour as Former Governor	Order of precedence of the United States; Within Mississippi	Succeeded by Jack Markell as Former Governor
Preceded by Haley Barbour as Former Governor	Order of precedence of the United States; Outside Mississippi	Succeeded by Rod Blagojevich as Former Governor
