= 2011 Mississippi gubernatorial election =

- November 8, 2011
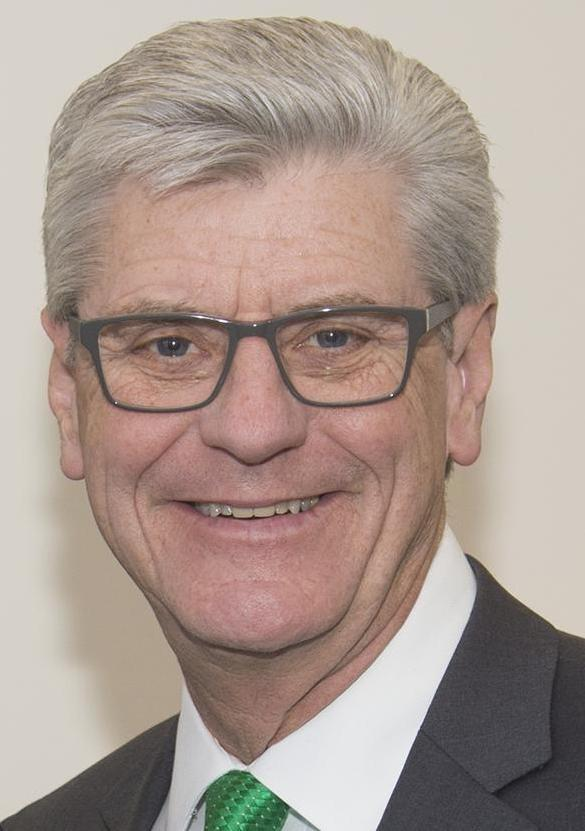

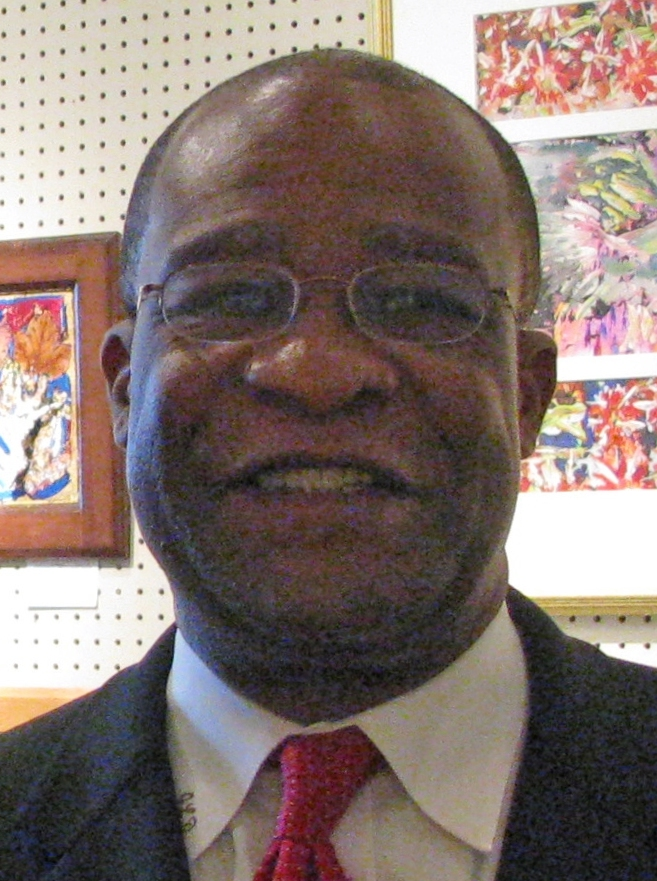
Nominee	Phil Bryant	Johnny DuPree
Party	Republican	Democratic
Electoral vote	82	40
Popular vote	544,851	348,617
Percentage	60.98%	39.02%
- County results Bryant: 50–60% 60–70% 70–80% DuPree: 50–60% 60–70% 70–80% 80–90%
Governor before election
Haley Barbour
Republican
Elected Governor
Phil Bryant
Republican

The 2011 Mississippi gubernatorial election was held on November 8, 2011. Incumbent Republican Governor of Mississippi Haley Barbour was unable to run for a third term due to term limits.

Republican nominee Lieutenant Governor Phil Bryant defeated the Democratic nominee, Hattiesburg Mayor Johnny DuPree. Sworn in on January 10, 2012, Bryant became only the third Republican governor of Mississippi since Reconstruction. This was the first election in which Republicans won three consecutive gubernatorial elections in the state. This was also the first time that Issaquena County voted Republican for governor since 1873 and Benton County did so for the first time ever.

== Republican primary ==
=== Candidates ===
- James Broadwater, businessman
- Phil Bryant, lieutenant governor of Mississippi
- Dave Dennis, former New Orleans Federal Reserve Board chairman
- Hudson Holliday, Pearl River County Supervisor
- Ron Williams, businessman

=== Polling ===
Poll source	Date(s) administered	Sample size	Margin of error	Phil Bryant	Dave Dennis	Other	Undecided
Public Policy Polling	March 24–27, 2011	400	± 4.9%	63%	14%	3%	20%

=== Results ===
Republican primary results
Party	Candidate	Votes	%
Republican	Phil Bryant	172,300	59.46
Republican	Dave Dennis	74,546	25.72
Republican	Ron Williams	25,555	8.82
Republican	Hudson Holliday	13,761	4.75
Republican	James Broadwater	3,626	1.25
Total votes		289,788	100.00

== Democratic primary ==
=== Candidates ===
- William Bond Compton Jr., 2007 candidate for governor
- Johnny DuPree, Hattiesburg mayor
- Bill Luckett, businessman and attorney
- Guy Dale Shaw

=== Results ===
Results by county DuPree: 30–40%; 40–50%; 50–60%; 60–70%; 70–80%; 80–90%; >90%; Luckett: 40–50%; 50–60%; 60–70%; 70–80%; Shaw: 40–50%

Democratic primary results
Party	Candidate	Votes	%
Democratic	Johnny DuPree	179,748	43.57
Democratic	Bill Luckett	161,833	39.23
Democratic	William Bond Compton, Jr.	40,452	9.81
Democratic	Guy Dale Shaw	30,497	7.39
Total votes		412,530	100.00

=== Runoff results ===
Results by county DuPree: 50–60%; 60–70%; 70–80%; 80–90%; >90%; Luckett: 50–60%; 60–70%; 70–80%; Tie: 50%

Democratic primary runoff results
Party	Candidate	Votes	%
Democratic	Johnny DuPree	177,767	54.99
Democratic	Bill Luckett	145,517	45.01
Total votes		323,284	100.00

== General election ==
=== Predictions ===
Source	Ranking	As of
Rothenberg Political Report	Safe R	November 4, 2011
Governing	Safe R	November 4, 2011
Cook	Safe R	November 4, 2011
Sabato	Safe R	November 4, 2011

=== Polling ===
Poll source	Date(s) administered	Sample size	Margin of error	Phil Bryant (R)	Johnny DuPree (D)	Other	Undecided
Public Policy Polling	November 4–6, 2011	796	± 3.5%	54%	40%	—	6%
Public Policy Polling	March 24–27, 2011	817	± 3.4%	56%	25%	—	19%

Hypothetical polling

Poll source	Date(s) administered	Sample size	Margin of error	Dave Dennis (R)	Johnny DuPree (D)	Other	Undecided
Public Policy Polling	March 24–27, 2011	817	± 3.4%	41%	28%	—	31%

Poll source	Date(s) administered	Sample size	Margin of error	Hudson Holliday (R)	Johnny DuPree (D)	Other	Undecided
Public Policy Polling	March 24–27, 2011	817	± 3.4%	37%	28%	—	35%

Poll source	Date(s) administered	Sample size	Margin of error	Phil Bryant (R)	Bill Luckett (D)	Other	Undecided
Public Policy Polling	March 24–27, 2011	817	± 3.4%	53%	27%	—	20%

Poll source	Date(s) administered	Sample size	Margin of error	Dave Dennis (R)	Bill Luckett (D)	Other	Undecided
Public Policy Polling	March 24–27, 2011	817	± 3.4%	43%	27%	—	32%

Poll source	Date(s) administered	Sample size	Margin of error	Hudson Holliday (R)	Bill Luckett (D)	Other	Undecided
Public Policy Polling	March 24–27, 2011	817	± 3.4%	38%	28%	—	34%

=== Results ===
Candidate	Party	Popular vote		Electoral vote	
Candidate	Party	Votes	%	Votes	%
Phil Bryant	Republican Party	544,851	60.98	82	67.21
Johnny DuPree	Democratic Party	348,617	39.02	40	32.79
Total		893,468	100.00	122	100.00
Source: Mississippi Secretary of State

==== By county ====
County	Phil Bryant Republican		Johnny DuPree Democratic		Margin		Total
County	#	%	#	%	#	%	Total
Adams	5,056	48.34%	5,403	51.66%	-347	-3.32%	10,459
Alcorn	8,210	72.53%	3,110	27.47%	5,100	45.05%	11,320
Amite	3,637	57.87%	2,648	42.13%	989	15.74%	6,285
Attala	3,771	62.79%	2,235	37.21%	1,536	25.57%	6,006
Benton	1,924	56.11%	1,505	43.89%	419	12.22%	3,429
Bolivar	4,083	38.65%	6,482	61.35%	-2,399	-22.71%	10,565
Calhoun	4,123	69.35%	1,822	30.65%	2,301	38.70%	5,945
Carroll	3,358	71.22%	1,357	28.78%	2,001	42.44%	4,715
Chickasaw	3,626	54.38%	3,042	45.62%	584	8.76%	6,668
Choctaw	2,225	71.94%	868	28.06%	1,357	43.87%	3,093
Claiborne	627	16.65%	3,138	83.35%	-2,511	-66.69%	3,765
Clarke	4,322	65.55%	2,271	34.45%	2,051	31.11%	6,593
Clay	3,552	47.70%	3,895	52.30%	-343	-4.61%	7,447
Coahoma	2,022	39.27%	3,127	60.73%	-1,105	-21.46%	5,149
Copiah	5,073	52.94%	4,509	47.06%	564	5.89%	9,582
Covington	4,567	59.14%	3,156	40.86%	1,411	18.27%	7,723
DeSoto	28,257	76.49%	8,687	23.51%	19,570	52.97%	36,944
Forrest	12,574	57.57%	9,268	42.43%	3,306	15.14%	21,842
Franklin	2,228	66.73%	1,111	33.27%	1,117	33.45%	3,339
George	5,360	79.99%	1,341	20.01%	4,019	59.98%	6,701
Greene	3,239	73.41%	1,173	26.59%	2,066	46.83%	4,412
Grenada	4,495	58.64%	3,171	41.36%	1,324	17.27%	7,666
Hancock	8,837	72.63%	3,330	27.37%	5,507	45.26%	12,167
Harrison	25,488	63.68%	14,540	36.32%	10,948	27.35%	40,028
Hinds	24,092	34.45%	45,851	65.55%	-21,759	-31.11%	69,943
Holmes	1,421	23.59%	4,603	76.41%	-3,182	-52.82%	6,024
Humphreys	1,367	35.33%	2,502	64.67%	-1,135	-29.34%	3,869
Issaquena	253	50.70%	246	49.30%	7	1.40%	499
Itawamba	5,893	77.70%	1,691	22.30%	4,202	55.41%	7,584
Jackson	23,444	69.12%	10,476	30.88%	12,968	38.23%	33,920
Jasper	3,124	45.85%	3,689	54.15%	-565	-8.29%	6,813
Jefferson	503	15.73%	2,694	84.27%	-2,191	-68.53%	3,197
Jefferson Davis	2,313	42.63%	3,113	57.37%	-800	-14.74%	5,426
Jones	16,696	70.91%	6,848	29.09%	9,848	41.83%	23,544
Kemper	1,864	41.75%	2,601	58.25%	-737	-16.51%	4,465
Lafayette	7,827	61.10%	4,984	38.90%	2,843	22.19%	12,811
Lamar	14,468	79.03%	3,839	20.97%	10,629	58.06%	18,307
Lauderdale	13,838	65.67%	7,235	34.33%	6,603	31.33%	21,073
Lawrence	3,756	65.48%	1,980	34.52%	1,776	30.96%	5,736
Leake	3,983	61.09%	2,537	38.91%	1,446	22.18%	6,520
Lee	17,087	68.82%	7,740	31.18%	9,347	37.65%	24,827
Leflore	3,413	38.63%	5,421	61.37%	-2,008	-22.73%	8,834
Lincoln	8,761	69.95%	3,764	30.05%	4,997	39.90%	12,525
Lowndes	10,272	58.75%	7,213	41.25%	3,059	17.49%	17,485
Madison	21,176	63.16%	12,349	36.84%	8,827	26.33%	33,525
Marion	7,012	66.90%	3,469	33.10%	3,543	33.80%	10,481
Marshall	4,529	49.41%	4,638	50.59%	-109	-1.19%	9,167
Monroe	7,721	63.09%	4,517	36.91%	3,204	26.18%	12,238
Montgomery	2,518	60.89%	1,617	39.11%	901	21.79%	4,135
Neshoba	6,390	76.86%	1,924	23.14%	4,466	53.72%	8,314
Newton	5,169	71.57%	2,053	28.43%	3,116	43.15%	7,222
Noxubee	1,099	27.93%	2,836	72.07%	-1,737	-44.14%	3,935
Oktibbeha	7,087	56.24%	5,514	43.76%	1,573	12.48%	12,601
Panola	7,258	54.17%	6,140	45.83%	1,118	8.34%	13,398
Pearl River	11,080	79.83%	2,799	20.17%	8,281	59.67%	13,879
Perry	3,514	73.12%	1,292	26.88%	2,222	46.23%	4,806
Pike	6,663	50.78%	6,458	49.22%	205	1.56%	13,121
Pontotoc	7,947	76.68%	2,417	23.32%	5,530	53.36%	10,364
Prentiss	5,423	70.36%	2,285	29.64%	3,138	40.71%	7,708
Quitman	1,009	43.57%	1,307	56.43%	-298	-12.87%	2,316
Rankin	35,399	79.86%	8,930	20.14%	26,469	59.71%	44,329
Scott	5,166	63.26%	3,000	36.74%	2,166	26.52%	8,166
Sharkey	788	38.10%	1,280	61.90%	-492	-23.79%	2,068
Simpson	6,208	65.58%	3,259	34.42%	2,949	31.15%	9,467
Smith	5,377	76.51%	1,651	23.49%	3,726	53.02%	7,028
Stone	4,207	71.05%	1,714	28.95%	2,493	42.10%	5,921
Sunflower	2,389	40.18%	3,557	59.82%	-1,168	-19.64%	5,946
Tallahatchie	2,112	48.71%	2,224	51.29%	-112	-2.58%	4,336
Tate	5,612	68.16%	2,621	31.84%	2,991	36.33%	8,233
Tippah	5,895	75.37%	1,926	24.63%	3,969	50.75%	7,821
Tishomingo	4,718	75.42%	1,538	24.58%	3,180	50.83%	6,256
Tunica	949	29.24%	2,297	70.76%	-1,348	-41.53%	3,246
Union	6,997	78.39%	1,929	21.61%	5,068	56.78%	8,926
Walthall	3,261	61.19%	2,068	38.81%	1,193	22.39%	5,329
Warren	9,019	58.57%	6,380	41.43%	2,639	17.14%	15,399
Washington	4,456	40.93%	6,431	59.07%	-1,975	-18.14%	10,887
Wayne	5,110	59.01%	3,549	40.99%	1,561	18.03%	8,659
Webster	3,459	78.52%	946	21.48%	2,513	57.05%	4,405
Wilkinson	1,067	34.05%	2,067	65.95%	-1,000	-31.91%	3,134
Winston	4,797	58.36%	3,423	41.64%	1,374	16.72%	8,220
Yalobusha	2,749	57.58%	2,025	42.42%	724	15.17%	4,774
Yazoo	4,492	53.08%	3,971	46.92%	521	6.16%	8,463
Totals	544,851	60.98%	348,617	39.02%	196,234	21.96%	893,468

==== Counties that flipped from Democratic to Republican ====
- Benton (largest municipality: Ashland)
- Chickasaw (largest city: Houston)
- Copiah (largest city: Crystal Springs)
- Issaquena (largest city: Mayersville)
- Prentiss (largest city: Booneville)
- Wayne (largest municipality: Waynesboro)
- Winston (largest city: Louisville)

==== Counties that flipped from Republican to Democratic ====
- Adams (largest city: Natchez)

== See also ==
- 2011 United States elections
