= 2015 local electoral calendar =

Worldwide local elections held in 2015

This local electoral calendar for 2015 lists the subnational elections held in 2015. Referendums, recall and retention elections, and national by-elections (special elections) are also included.

== January ==
- 4 January:
  - Hong Kong, Rural Committees (1st phase)
  - India, Chhattisgarh, Municipal Corporations, Municipal Councils and Town Councils
  - Uzbekistan, Regional Councils, District Councils and City Councils (2nd round)
- 5 January: Belize, Cayo North, House of Representatives by-election
- 6 January: Federated States of Micronesia, Kosrae, Governor (2nd round)
- 11 January:
  - Hong Kong, Rural Committees (2nd phase)
  - Japan, Saga, Governor
- 13 January: India, Madhya Pradesh, District Councils, Township Councils and Village Councils (1st phase)
- 16 January: India, Rajasthan, District Councils, Township Councils and Village Councils (1st phase)
- 18 January: Hong Kong, Rural Committees (3rd phase)
- 22 January: India, Rajasthan, District Councils, Township Councils and Village Councils (2nd phase)
- 25 January:
  - Austria, Lower Austria, Municipal Councils
  - Comoros
    - Anjouan, Island Council
    - Grande Comore, Island Council
    - Mohéli, Island Council
  - Hong Kong, Rural Committees (4th phase)
  - Japan, Yamanashi, Governor
- 28 January: India, Chhattisgarh, District Councils, Township Councils and Village Councils (1st phase)
- 30 January: India, Rajasthan, District Councils, Township Councils and Village Councils (3rd phase)
- 31 January:
  - Australia, Queensland, Legislative Assembly
  - India, Madhya Pradesh, District Councils, Township Councils, Village Councils (2nd phase) and Mayors

== February ==
- 1 February:
  - France, Doubs's 4th constituency, National Assembly by-election (1st round)
  - India, Chhattisgarh, District Councils, Township Councils and Village Councils (2nd phase)
  - Japan, Aichi, Governor
- 2 February: Kenya, Homa Bay, Senate by-election
- 4 February: India, Chhattisgarh, District Councils, Township Councils and Village Councils (3rd phase)
- 7 February:
  - India
    - Delhi, Legislative Assembly
    - Rajasthan, District Heads and Township Heads
  - Taiwan, Changhua, Miaoli, Nantou, Pingtung and Taichung, Legislative Yuan by-elections
- 8 February:
  - France, Doubs's 4th constituency, National Assembly by-election (2nd round)
  - India, Rajasthan, District Deputy Heads and Township Deputy Heads
  - Poland, senatorial constituency No. 75, Senate by-election
  - Switzerland, Basel-Landschaft, Executive Council and Landrat
- 12 February:
  - Australia, Lord Howe Island, Board
  - India, Assam, Municipal Boards and Town Committees
- 13 February: India, Bangaon, House of the People by-election
- 15 February: Germany, Hamburg, Parliament
- 19 February: India, Madhya Pradesh, District Councils, Township Councils and Village Councils (3rd phase)
- 22 February:
  - Comoros, Communal Councils
  - Hungary, Veszprém 1, National Assembly by-election
  - India, Punjab, Municipal Corporations
- 24 February: United States, Chicago, Mayor and City Council (1st round)
- 25 February: India, Punjab, Municipal Councils and Town Councils

== March ==
- 1 March:
  - Austria, Carinthia, Mayors (1st round) and Municipal Councils
  - El Salvador, Mayors and Municipal Councils
  - Lithuania
    - Žirmūnai, Seimas by-election (1st round)
    - Mayors and Municipal Councils (1st round)
  - Tajikistan, Regional Legislatures, City Legislatures and District Legislatures
- 3 March:
  - Federated States of Micronesia, Chuuk, House of Representatives
  - United States
    - Los Angeles, City Council (1st round)
    - Oklahoma City, City Council
    - Tampa, Mayor and City Council (1st round)
    - Wichita, Mayor and City Council (1st round)
- 4 March: Belize, City Councils and Town Councils
- 8 March: Switzerland
  - Aargau, referendums
  - Appenzell Ausserrhoden, Executive Council and Cantonal Council
  - Basel-Landschaft, referendums
  - Basel-Stadt, referendums
  - Geneva, referendum
  - Grisons, referendum
  - Nidwalden, referendum
  - Schaffhausen, referendums
  - Schwyz, referendums
  - Solothurn, referendums
- 13 March: Syria, Rojava, Municipal Councils
- 15 March:
  - Armenia, Mayors, Local Councils and Community Chiefs
  - Austria
    - Carinthia, Mayors (2nd round)
    - Vorarlberg, Mayors (1st round) and Municipal Councils
  - India, Goa, District Councils
  - Liechtenstein, Mayors and Municipal Councils
  - Lithuania
    - Žirmūnai, Seimas by-election (2nd round)
    - Mayors and Municipal Councils (2nd round)
  - Monaco, Communal Council
  - Pakistan, NA-137, National Assembly by-election
- 16 March:
  - Kenya, Kajiado Central, National Assembly by-election
- 16 March – 29 May: Canada, Metro Vancouver, TransLink referendum
- 18 March: Netherlands
  - Dutch Provincial Parliaments
  - Dutch Water Boards
  - Bonaire, Island Council
  - Saba, Island Council
  - Sint Eustatius, Island Council
- 20 March: American Samoa, District 6, House of Representatives by-election
- 22 March:
  - Austria, Styria, Municipal Councils
  - France, Departemental Councils (1st round)
    - Guadeloupe, Departmental Council (1st round)
    - Mayotte, Departmental Council (1st round)
    - Réunion, Departmental Council (1st round)
  - Moldova, Gagauzia, Governor
  - Spain, Andalusia, Parliament
- 24 March:
  - Antigua and Barbuda, Barbuda, Council
  - United States
    - Jacksonville, Mayor and City Council (1st round)
    - Tampa, City Council (2nd round)
- 27 March: Zimbabwe, Chirumanzu–Zibagwe and Mount Darwin West, House of Assembly by-elections
- 28 March:
  - Australia, New South Wales, Legislative Assembly and Legislative Council
  - New Zealand, Northland, House of Representatives by-election
- 29 March:
  - Austria
    - Carinthia, Mayors (3rd round)
    - Vorarlberg, Mayors (2nd round)
  - Bolivia, Governors, Departamental Legislative Assemblies, Mayors, Municipal Councils, Beni Provincial Subgovernors, Gran Chaco Regional Assembly and Tarija Sectional Executives
  - France, Departemental Councils (2nd round)
    - Guadeloupe, Departmental Council (2nd round)
    - Mayotte, Departmental Council (2nd round)
    - Réunion, Departmental Council (2nd round)
  - Kazakhstan, Regional Councils and City Councils
  - Portugal, Madeira, Legislative Assembly
  - Switzerland, Lucerne, Executive Council (1st round) and Cantonal Council
- 31 March: Cook Islands, Vaipae-Tautu, Parliament by-election

== April ==
- 7 April: United States
  - Anchorage, Mayor (1st round)
  - Chicago, Mayor and City Council (2nd round)
  - Colorado Springs, Mayor (1st round) and City Council
  - Ferguson, City Council
  - Kansas City, MO, Mayor and City Council (1st round)
  - Las Vegas, Mayor and City Council
  - St. Louis, Board of Aldermen
  - Wichita, Mayor and City Council (2nd round)
  - Wisconsin, Supreme Court and Court of Appeals
- 8 April: India, Assam, Bodoland, Territorial Council
- 11 April:
  - Malta, Local Councils
  - Nigeria
    - Abia, Governor and House of Assembly
    - Adamawa, Governor and House of Assembly
    - Akwa Ibom, Governor and House of Assembly
    - Anambra, House of Assembly
    - Bauchi, Governor and House of Assembly
    - Bayelsa, House of Assembly
    - Benue, Governor and House of Assembly
    - Borno, Governor and House of Assembly
    - Cross River, Governor and House of Assembly
    - Delta, Governor and House of Assembly
    - Ebonyi, Governor and House of Assembly
    - Edo, House of Assembly
    - Ekiti, House of Assembly
    - Enugu, Governor and House of Assembly
    - Gombe, Governor and House of Assembly
    - Imo, Governor and House of Assembly
    - Jigawa, Governor and House of Assembly
    - Kaduna, Governor and House of Assembly
    - Kano, Governor and House of Assembly
    - Katsina, Governor and House of Assembly
    - Kebbi, Governor and House of Assembly
    - Kogi, House of Assembly
    - Kwara, Governor and House of Assembly
    - Lagos, Governor and House of Assembly
    - Nasarawa, Governor and House of Assembly
    - Niger, Governor and House of Assembly
    - Ogun, Governor and House of Assembly
    - Ondo, House of Assembly
    - Osun, House of Assembly
    - Oyo, Governor and House of Assembly
    - Plateau, Governor and House of Assembly
    - Rivers, Governor and House of Assembly
    - Sokoto, Governor and House of Assembly
    - Taraba, Governor and House of Assembly
    - Yobe, Governor and House of Assembly
    - Zamfara, Governor and House of Assembly
- 12 April:
  - Hungary, Veszprém 3, National Assembly by-election
  - Japan, Unified Local elections (1st phase)
    - Aichi, Prefectural Assembly
    - Akita, Prefectural Assembly
    - Aomori, Prefectural Assembly
    - Chiba, Prefectural Assembly
    - Ehime, Prefectural Assembly
    - Fukui, Governor and Prefectural Assembly
    - Fukuoka, Governor and Prefectural Assembly
    - Gifu, Prefectural Assembly
    - Gunma, Prefectural Assembly
    - Hiroshima, Prefectural Assembly
      - Hiroshima City, Mayor and City Council
    - Hokkaido, Governor and Legislative Assembly
      - Sapporo, Mayor and City Council
    - Hyōgo, Prefectural Assembly
    - Ishikawa, Prefectural Assembly
    - Kagawa, Prefectural Assembly
    - Kagoshima, Prefectural Assembly
    - Kanagawa, Governor and Prefectural Assembly
      - Yokohama, City Council
    - Kōchi, Prefectural Assembly
    - Kumamoto, Prefectural Assembly
    - Kyoto, Prefectural Assembly
    - Mie, Governor Prefectural Assembly
    - Miyazaki, Prefectural Assembly
    - Nagano, Prefectural Assembly
    - Nagasaki, Prefectural Assembly
    - Nara, Governor and Prefectural Assembly
    - Niigata, Prefectural Assembly
    - Oita, Governor and Prefectural Assembly
    - Okayama, Prefectural Assembly
    - Osaka, Prefectural Assembly
    - Saga, Prefectural Assembly
    - Saitama, Prefectural Assembly
    - Shiga, Prefectural Assembly
    - Shimane, Governor and Prefectural Assembly
    - Shizuoka, Prefectural Assembly
    - Tochigi, Prefectural Assembly
    - Tokushima, Governor and Prefectural Assembly
    - Tottori, Governor and Prefectural Assembly
    - Toyama, Prefectural Assembly
    - Wakayama, Prefectural Assembly
    - Yamagata, Prefectural Assembly
    - Yamaguchi, Prefectural Assembly
    - Yamanashi, Prefectural Assembly
  - Switzerland
    - Schaffhausen, referendum
    - Zürich, Executive Council and Cantonal Council
- 17 April: Samoa, Sagaga-le-Usoga, Legislative Assembly by-election
- 18 April: Nigeria, Rivers, House of Assembly (revote in 6 constituencies)
- 19 April:
  - Cuba, Municipal Assemblies (1st round)
  - Switzerland, Ticino, Council of State and Grand Council
- 21 April:
  - Liberia, Rivercess-2, House of Representatives by-election
  - United States, Navajo Nation, President
- 22 April: India, Karnataka, Greater Bangalore, Municipal Corporation
- 23 April: Pakistan, NA-246, National Assembly by-election
- 25 April:
  - India, West Bengal, Municipal Corporations and Municipal Councils
    - Kolkata, Municipal Corporation
  - Nigeria
    - Abia, Governor and House of Assembly (revote in 9 LGAs)
    - Cross River, Biase and Yakurr 2, House of Assembly (revote)
    - Imo, Governor and House of Assembly (revote in 250 precincts)
    - Taraba, Governor and House of Assembly (revote in 8 LGAs)
- 26 April:
  - Argentina, Neuquén, Governor, Provincial Legislature, Mayors and Municipal Councils
  - Cuba, Municipal Assemblies (2nd round)
  - Japan, Unified Local elections (2nd phase), City, Ward, Town and Village Mayors and Councils
  - Switzerland, Appenzell Innerrhoden
    - Council of States by-election
    - Landsgemeinde
- 28 April: Bangladesh
  - Chittagong, Mayor and City Corporation
  - Dhaka North, Mayor and City Corporation
  - Dhaka South, Mayor and City Corporation
- 29 April: South Korea, Ganghwa, Gwanak, Gwangju and Jungwon-gu, National Assembly by-elections
- 30 April: India, Mizoram, Village Councils and Local Councils

== May ==
- 2 May: Australia, Tasmania, (Derwent, Mersey and Windermere) Legislative Council
- 3 May:
  - Bolivia, Beni and Tarija, Governors (2nd round)
  - Switzerland
    - Appenzell Innerrhoden, Grand Council
    - Glarus, Landsgemeinde
- 4 May:
  - Canada, Prince Edward Island, Legislative Assembly
  - India, Tripura, Tripura Tribal Areas Autonomous District, Council
  - Kenya, Kabete, National Assembly by-election
- 5 May:
  - Canada, Alberta, Legislative Assembly
  - Malaysia, Rompin, House of Representatives by-election
  - United States
    - New York's 11th congressional district, U.S. House of Representatives special election
    - Anchorage, Mayor (2nd round)
    - Denver, Mayor and City Council (1st round)
- 7 May:
  - Malaysia, Permatang Pauh, House of Representatives by-election
  - United Kingdom, England, Metropolitan Borough Councils, Unitary Authorities, District Councils, Mayors and Bedfordshire referendum
    - Birmingham, City Council
    - Leeds, City Council
    - Liverpool, City Council
    - Manchester, City Council
- 8 May: Philippines, Puerto Princesa, Mayor recall election
- 9 May: United States
  - Arlington, Mayor and City Council
  - Dallas, Mayor and City Council (1st round)
  - Fort Worth, Mayor and City Council
  - San Antonio, Mayor and City Council (1st round)
- 9–22 May: Papua New Guinea, Pomio, National Parliament by-election
- 10 May:
  - Germany, Bremen, Parliament and City Councils
  - Italy, Aosta Valley and Trentino-Alto Adige/Südtirol, Mayors and Municipal Councils (1st round)
  - Switzerland, Lucerne, Executive Council (2nd round)
  - Uruguay, Departmental Mayors, Departmental Councils, Municipal Mayors and Municipal Councils
- 11 May: Guyana, Regional Democratic Councils
- 11–25 May: Papua New Guinea, Autonomous Region of Bougainville, President and House of Representatives
- 12 May: United States, Mississippi's 1st congressional district, U.S. House of Representatives special election (1st round)
- 13 May: Qatar, Central Municipal Council
- 17 May:
  - Argentina, Salta, Governor, Chamber of Deputies, Senate, Mayors and Municipal Councils
  - Japan, Osaka City, Metropolis Plan referendum
- 19 May: United States
  - Colorado Springs, Mayor (2nd round)
  - Jacksonville, Mayor and City Council (2nd round)
  - Kentucky, Supreme Court special election
  - Los Angeles, City Council (2nd round)
- 21 May: Isle of Man, Douglas North and Douglas South, House of Keys by-elections
- 22 May: Ireland, Carlow–Kilkenny, Dáil by-election
- 23 May: Nigeria, Rivers, Local Government Councils and Chairmen
- 24 May:
  - Ethiopia, Regional Councils
  - Italy, Aosta Valley and Trentino-Alto Adige/Südtirol, Mayors and Municipal Councils (2nd round)
  - Spain, Regional Legislatures, Municipal Councils and Basque Foral Parliaments
    - Álava, Foral Parliament
    - Aragon, Parliament
      - Zaragoza, City Council
    - Asturias, Parliament
    - Balearic Islands, Parliament and Island Councils
    - Barcelona, City Council
    - Biscay, Foral Parliament
    - Canary Islands, Parliament and Island Cabildos
    - Cantabria, Parliament
    - Castile and León, Parliament
    - Castile-La Mancha, Parliament
    - Ceuta, Assembly
    - Extremadura, Assembly
    - Gipuzkoa, Foral Parliament
    - La Rioja, Parliament
    - Madrid (Community), Assembly
      - Madrid, City Council
    - Melilla, Assembly
    - Murcia, Assembly
    - Navarre, Parliament
    - Seville, City Council
    - Valencian Community, Parliament
      - Valencia, City Council
- 25 May: Suriname, District Councils and Local Councils
- 26 May: India, Jharkhand, Municipal Councils
- 29 May: India, Karnataka, Village Councils (1st phase)
- 30 May:
  - Bangladesh, Magura-1, House of the Nation by-election
  - Pakistan, Khyber Pakhtunkhwa, District Councils, Township Councils and Union Councils
- 31 May:
  - Austria
    - Burgenland, Parliament
    - Styria, Parliament
  - Croatia, National Minorities Councils
  - Italy, Regional Councils, Mayors and Municipal Councils (1st round)
    - Apulia, Regional Council
    - Campania, Regional Council
    - Liguria, Regional Council
    - Marche, Regional Council
    - Tuscany, Regional Council
    - Umbria, Regional Council
    - Veneto, Regional Council

== June ==
- 1 June: India, Manipur
  - Chandel Autonomous District, Council
  - Churachandpur Autonomous District, Council
  - Sadar Hills Autonomous District, Council
  - Senapati Autonomous District, Council
  - Tamenglong Autonomous District, Council
  - Ukhrul Autonomous District, Council
- 2 June:
  - India, Karnataka, Village Councils (2nd phase)
  - United States
    - Mississippi's 1st congressional district, U.S. House of Representatives special election (2nd round)
    - Denver, City Council (2nd round)
- 7 June:
  - Armenia, Mayors, Local Councils and Community Chiefs
  - Germany, Saxony, Mayors (1st round) and District Councilors
    - Dresden, Mayor (1st round)
  - Japan, Aomori, Governor
  - Lithuania, Širvintos District, Mayor (revote), and Trakai District, Mayor and Municipal Council (revote)
  - Mexico, state elections
    - Baja California Sur, Governor, Congress, Mayors and Municipal Councils
    - Campeche, Governor, Congress, Mayors and Municipal Councils
    - Colima, Governor, Congress, Mayors and Municipal Councils
    - Federal District, Legislative Assembly and Mayors
    - Guanajuato, Congress, Mayors and Municipal Councils
    - Guerrero, Governor, Congress, Mayors and Municipal Councils
    - Jalisco, Congress, Mayors and Municipal Councils
    - Mexico (state), Congress, Mayors and Municipal Councils
    - Michoacán, Governor, Congress, Mayors and Municipal Councils
    - Morelos, Congress, Mayors and Municipal Councils
    - Nuevo León, Governor, Congress, Mayors and Municipal Councils
    - Querétaro, Governor, Congress, Mayors and Municipal Councils
    - San Luis Potosí, Governor, Congress, Mayors and Municipal Councils
    - Sonora, Governor, Congress, Mayors and Municipal Councils
    - Tabasco, Congress, Mayors and Municipal Councils
    - Yucatán, Congress, Mayors and Municipal Councils
- 8 June: Pakistan
  - NA-108, National Assembly by-election
  - Gilgit-Baltistan, Legislative Assembly
- 10 June: Zimbabwe, Dangamvura-Chikanga, Dzivarasekwa, Glen View South, Harare East, Headlands, Highfield West, Hurungwe West, Kambuzuma, Kuwadzana, Lobengula, Luveve, Makokoba, Mbizo, Pelandaba-Mpopoma, Pumula and Tsholotsho North, House of Assembly by-elections
- 13 June: United States
  - Dallas, Mayor and City Council (2nd round)
  - San Antonio, Mayor and City Council (2nd round)
- 14 June:
  - Argentina
    - Río Negro, Governor, Provincial Legislature, Mayors and Municipal Councils
    - Santa Fe, Governor, Chamber of Deputies, Senate, Mayors and Municipal Councils
  - Italy, Mayors and Municipal Councils (2nd round)
  - Mauritius, Municipal Councils
  - Moldova, Mayors (1st round), District Councils and Municipal Councils
    - Gagauzia, Mayors (1st round) and Municipal Councils
  - Switzerland
    - Basel-Landschaft, referendums
    - Basel-Stadt, referendum
    - Geneva, referendum
    - Grisons, referendum
    - Jura, referendums
    - Nidwalden, referendum
    - St. Gallen, referendum
    - Ticino, referendums
    - Uri, referendums
    - Valais, referendums
    - Zug, referendum
    - Zürich, referendums
- 21 June:
  - Albania, Mayors, Municipal Councils, Unit Mayors and Unit Councils
  - Argentina
    - Mendoza, Governor, Chamber of Deputies, Senate, Mayors and Municipal Councils
    - Tierra del Fuego, Governor (1st round), Provincial Legislature, Mayors and Municipal Councils
  - Lithuania, Šilutė District, Mayor and Municipal Council (revote)
- 23 June: United States, Kansas City, MO, Mayor and City Council (2nd round)
- 27 June: United States, Cherokee Nation, Principal Chief, Deputy Chief and Tribal Council (1st round)
- 28 June:
  - Argentina, Tierra del Fuego, Governor (2nd round), Mayor and Municipal Council
  - Benin, Communal Councils, Municipal Councils and District/Village Councils
  - Germany, Saxony, Mayors (2nd round)
  - Moldova, Mayors (2nd round)
    - Gagauzia, Mayors (2nd round)
- 29 June: Burundi, Communal Councils
- 30 June: Zambia, Malambo, Mulobezi and Petauke Central, National Assembly by-elections

== July ==
- 5 July:
  - Argentina
    - Buenos Aires City, Chief of Government (1st round), City Legislature and Communal Boards
    - Córdoba, Governor, Provincial Legislature, Mayors, Municipal Councils and Communal Officers
    - La Rioja, Governor, Provincial Legislature, Mayors and Municipal Councils
    - Corrientes, Chamber of Deputies, Senate, Mayors and Municipal Councils
  - Germany, Dresden, Mayor (2nd round)
  - Japan, Gunma, Governor
- 7 July: Ghana, Talensi, Parliament by-election
- 8 July: Belize, Dangriga, House of Representatives by-election
- 11–24 July: Papua New Guinea, Goilala and Sandaun, National Parliament by-elections
- 19 July:
  - Argentina, Buenos Aires City, Chief of Government (2nd round)
  - Mexico, Chiapas, Congress, Mayors and Municipal Councils
  - North Korea, Provincial People's Assemblies, County People's Assemblies and Municipal People's Assemblies
- 21 July: United States, Navajo Nation, Presidential Language Requirement referendum
- 24 July: Zimbabwe, Mudzi West, House of Assembly by-election
- 25 July: United States, Cherokee Nation, Tribal Council (2nd round)
- 26 July: Ukraine, Chernihiv constituency 205, Parliament by-election
- 31 July: Madagascar, Mayors and Municipal Councils

== August ==
- 4 August: United States, King County, Council (1st round)
- 6 August: United States, Nashville, Mayor and Metropolitan Council (1st round)
- 9 August: Japan, Saitama, Governor
- 15 August: Botswana, Good Hope-Mabule, National Assembly by-election
- 16 August: Pakistan, NA-19, National Assembly by-election
- 19 August: India, Assam, Kamrup District, Morigaon District and Nagaon District, Tiwa Autonomous Council
- 20 August: Japan, Iwate, Governor
- 23 August: Argentina, Tucumán, Governor, Provincial Legislature, Mayors and Municipal Councils
- 24 August: Burundi, Mayors and Hill Councils
- 25 August: United States, Phoenix, Mayor and City Council

== September ==
- 1 September: Ghana, District Assemblies and Unit Committees
- 4 September: Morocco, Regional Councils and Municipal Councils
- 6 September:
  - France, Aveyron's 3rd constituency, National Assembly by-election (1st round)
  - Germany, Mecklenburg-Vorpommern, Judicial Structure constitutional referendum
  - Guatemala, Mayors and Municipal Councils
  - Japan, Iwate, Prefectural Assembly
- 8 September: United States, Boston, City Council (1st round)
- 10 September:
  - Isle of Man, Glenfaba and Peel, House of Keys by-elections
  - United States
    - Illinois's 18th congressional district, U.S. House of Representatives special election
    - Nashville, Mayor and Metropolitan Council (2nd round)
- 13 September:
  - Armenia, Mayors, Local Councils and Community Chiefs
  - France, Aveyron's 3rd constituency, National Assembly by-election (2nd round)
  - Germany, North Rhine-Westphalia, District Administrators, District Councils, Mayors and Municipal Councils (1st round)
    - Essen, Lord Mayor (1st round)
  - Nagorno-Karabakh, Mayors, Local Councils and Community Chiefs
  - Russia, Federal Subject Heads, Federal Subject Legislatures, Municipal Heads, Municipal Councils, District Councils, Village Councils and Local referendums
    - Amur Oblast, Governor special election
    - Arkhangelsk Oblast, Governor special election
    - Belgorod Oblast, Duma
    - Bryansk Oblast, Governor special election
    - Chelyabinsk Oblast, Legislative Assembly
    - Chuvashia, Head
    - Irkutsk Oblast, Governor special election (1st round)
    - Jewish Autonomous Oblast, Governor
    - Kaliningrad Oblast, Governor
    - Kaluga Oblast, Governor and Legislative Assembly
    - Kamchatka Krai, Governor special election
    - Kemerovo Oblast, Governor
    - Komi Republic, State Council
    - Kostroma Oblast, Governor special election and Duma
    - Krasnodar Krai, Head of Administration special election
    - Kurgan Oblast, Duma
    - Leningrad Oblast, Governor special election
    - Magadan Oblast, Duma
    - Mari El, Head
    - Novosibirsk Oblast, Legislative Assembly
      - Novosibirsk, Council of Deputies
    - Omsk Oblast, Governor special election
    - Penza Oblast, Governor
    - Rostov Oblast, Governor
    - Ryazan Oblast, Duma
    - Sakhalin Oblast, Governor special election
    - Smolensk Oblast, Governor special election
    - Tambov Oblast, Head of Administration
    - Tatarstan, President
    - Voronezh Oblast, Duma
    - Yamalo-Nenets Autonomous Okrug, Legislative Assembly
- 14 September: Norway, County Councils and Municipal Councils
- 19 September:
  - Australia, Canning, House of Representatives by-election
  - Zimbabwe, Epworth, Marondera Central and Mbire, House of Assembly by-elections
- 20 September: Argentina, Chaco, Governor, Provincial Legislature, Mayors and Municipal Councils
- 24 September: Zambia, Lubansenshi and Solwezi West, National Assembly by-elections
- 27 September:
  - Austria, Upper Austria, Parliament, Mayors and Municipal Councils
  - Ecuador, La Manga del Cura, Join Which Province referendum
  - Germany, North Rhine-Westphalia, District Administrators, District Councils, Mayors and Municipal Councils (2nd round)
    - Essen, Lord Mayor (2nd round)
  - Russia, Irkutsk Oblast, Governor special election (2nd round)
  - Spain, Catalonia, Parliament

== October ==
- 6 October: United States
  - Albuquerque, City Council
  - Raleigh, Mayor and City Council (1st round)
- 8 October: United States, Memphis, Mayor and City Council (1st round)
- 9 October: India
  - Sikkim, Gangtok Municipal Corporation, Municipal Councils and Town Councils
  - Uttar Pradesh, District Councils and Township Councils (1st phase)
- 11 October:
  - Austria, Vienna, Parliament
  - Pakistan, NA-122 and NA-144, National Assembly by-elections
- 12 October: India
  - Bihar, Legislative Assembly (1st phase)
  - Meghalaya, Garo Hills Autonomous District, Council
- 13 October: India, Uttar Pradesh, District Councils and Township Councils (2nd phase)
- 15 October:
  - Switzerland, Uri, referendums
  - Vanuatu, Port Vila, Parliament by-election
- 16 October: India, Bihar, Legislative Assembly (2nd phase)
- 17 October:
  - Australia
    - Christmas Island, Shire Council
    - Cocos (Keeling) Islands, Shire Council
    - Western Australia, Mayors, Regional Councils, City Councils and Shire Councils
  - India, Uttar Pradesh, District Councils and Township Councils (3rd phase)
- 18 October:
  - Finland, Åland Islands, Parliament and Municipal Councils
  - Germany, Cologne, Lord Mayor
  - Switzerland
    - Bern, Executive Council (1st round)
    - Jura, Government (1st round) and Parliament
    - Neuchâtel, Council of State
    - Obwalden, referendums
    - Schaffhausen, referendum
- 23 October: India, Ladakh, Leh District, Ladakh Autonomous Hill Development Council
- 24 October: United States, Louisiana
  - Governor, Lieutenant Governor, Attorney General, Board of Elementary and Secondary Education (1st round), Commissioner of Agriculture and Forestry, Commissioner of Insurance, Secretary of State and Treasurer
  - House of Representatives and Senate (1st round)
- 25 October:
  - Argentina
    - Buenos Aires (Province), Governor, Chamber of Deputies, Senate, Mayors, Municipal Councils and School Counselors
    - Catamarca, Governor, Chamber of Deputies, Senate, Mayors and Municipal Councils
    - Chubut, Governor, Provincial Legislature, Mayors, Municipal Councils and Communal Officers
    - Entre Ríos, Governor, Chamber of Deputies, Senate, Mayors and Municipal Councils
    - Formosa, Governor, Provincial Legislature, Mayors and Municipal Councils
    - Jujuy, Governor, Provincial Legislature, Mayors and Municipal Councils
    - La Pampa, Governor, Chamber of Deputies, Mayors and Municipal Councils
    - Misiones, Governor, House of Representatives and Mayors
    - San Juan, Governor, Chamber of Deputies and Mayors
    - San Luis, Governor, Chamber of Deputies, Senate and Mayors
    - Santa Cruz, Governor, Chamber of Deputies, Development Commissioners, Mayors and Municipal Councils
  - Bulgaria, Mayors (1st round), Municipal Councils and Ward Mayors
  - Colombia, Governors, Departmental Assemblies, Mayors, Municipal Councils and Local Administrative Boards
    - Bogotá, Mayors, District Council and Local Administrative Boards
    - Cali, Mayor, City Council and Local Administrative Boards
    - Medellín, Mayor, City Council and Local Administrative Boards
  - Haiti, Mayors
  - India, Goa, Municipal Councils
  - Japan, Miyagi, Prefectural Assembly
  - Tanzania, Zanzibar, President, House of Representatives, District Councils, Town Councils and Municipal Council
  - Ukraine, City Mayors, Town Mayors, Village Mayors (1st round), Oblast Councils, Raion Councils, City Councils, Urban-District Councils, Town Councils and Village Councils
- 28 October: India, Bihar, Legislative Assembly (3rd phase)
- 29 October: India, Uttar Pradesh, District Councils and Township Councils (4th phase)
- 31 October: Pakistan
  - Punjab, Metropolitan Corporations, Municipal Corporations, Municipal Committees, District Councils and Unions Councils (1st phase)
  - Sindh, Metropolitan Corporations, District Municipal Corporations, Municipal Corporations, Municipal Committees, Town Committees, Union Committees, District Councils and Union Councils (1st phase)

== November ==
- 1 November:
  - Bulgaria, Mayors (2nd round)
  - India, Bihar, Legislative Assembly (4th phase)
- 2 November: India, Kerala, Municipal Corporations, Municipal Councils, District Councils, Township Councils and Village Councils (1st phase)
- 3 November: United States, State and Local elections
  - Kentucky, Governor, Agriculture Commissioner, Attorney General, Auditor, Secretary of State and Treasurer
  - Mississippi
    - Governor, Lieutenant Governor, Attorney General, Auditor, Commissioner of Agriculture and Commerce, Commissioner of Insurance, Public Service Commission, Secretary of State, Transportation Commission and Treasurer
    - House of Representatives and Senate
    - Public Schools constitutional referendum
  - New Jersey, General Assembly
  - Pennsylvania, Supreme Court, Commonwealth Court and Superior Court
  - Virginia, House of Delegates and Senate
  - Washington, Court of Appeals
  - Aurora, CO, Mayor and City Council
  - Boston, City Council (2nd round)
  - Charlotte, Mayor and City Council
  - Columbus, Mayor and City Council
  - Houston, Mayor, City Council (1st round) and Sexual Orientation and Gender Identity Discrimination referendum
  - Indianapolis, Mayor and City-County Council
  - King County, Council (2nd round)
    - Seattle, City Council
  - Miami, City Commission (1st round)
  - Philadelphia, Mayor and City Council
  - Pittsburgh, City Council
  - Raleigh, City Council (2nd round)
  - San Francisco, Mayor, City Attorney, District Attorney, Sheriff, Treasurer, Community College Board and Referendums
  - Tucson, Mayor and City Council
- 5 November: India
  - Bihar, Legislative Assembly (5th phase)
  - Kerala, Municipal Corporations, Municipal Councils, District Councils, Township Councils and Village Councils (2nd phase)
- 8 November:
  - Myanmar, State and Regional Hluttaws and Ethnic Affairs Ministers
  - Switzerland
    - Basel-Landschaft, referendums
    - Jura, Government (2nd round)
- 10 November: Federated States of Micronesia, Pohnpei, Governor (1st round) and State Legislature
- 14 November: Sierra Leone, Constituency 107, Parliament by-election
- 15 November:
  - Japan, Fukushima, Prefectural Assembly
  - Paraguay, Mayors and Municipal Boards
  - Switzerland
    - Basel-Stadt, referendums
    - Bern, Executive Council (2nd round)
    - Lucerne, referendums
    - Schaffhausen, referendum
    - St. Gallen, referendumss
  - Ukraine, City Mayors, Town Mayors, Village Mayors (2nd round and revote) and Village Councils (revote)
- 17 November: United States, Miami, City Commission (2nd round)
- 19 November:
  - Pakistan
    - Punjab, Metropolitan Corporations, Municipal Corporations and Municipal Committees, District Councils and Unions Councils (2nd phase)
    - Sindh, Metropolitan Corporations, District Municipal Corporations, Municipal Corporations, Municipal Committees, Town Committees, Union Committees, District Councils and Union Councils (2nd phase)
  - United States, Memphis, City Council (2nd round)
- 21 November:
  - India, Ratlam and Warangal, House of the People by-elections
  - Nigeria, Kogi, Governor
  - United States, Louisiana
    - Governor, Lieutenant Governor, Attorney General and Board of Elementary and Secondary Education (2nd round)
    - House of Representatives and Senate (2nd round)
- 22 November:
  - Hong Kong, District Councils
  - India
  - Gujarat, Municipal Corporations
    - Ahmedabad, Municipal Corporation
  - Jharkhand, District Councils, Township Councils and Village Councils (1st phase)
  - Japan, Osaka, Governor
  - Switzerland, Zürich, referendum
- 23 November: Canada, Northwest Territories, Legislative Assembly
- 24 November: Japan, Kochi, Governor
- 27 November: Namibia, Regional Councils and Local Councils
- 28 November: India
  - Jharkhand, District Councils, Township Councils and Village Councils (2nd phase)
  - Mizoram, Lai Autonomous District, Council
  - Uttar Pradesh, Village Heads and Village Councils (1st phase)
- 29 November:
  - Germany, Hamburg and Kiel, 2024 Olympics referendum
  - India, Gujarat, Municipal Councils, District Councils and Township Councils
  - Switzerland
    - Nidwalden, referendums
    - Valais, referendums
  - Transnistria, District Chairs, District Councils, Mayors and Municipal Councils
  - Ukraine, Village Mayors and Village Councils (revote), and Krasnoarmiysk and Mariupol, Mayors and City Councils
- 30 November:
  - Canada, Newfoundland and Labrador, House of Assembly
  - Pakistan, Islamabad Capital Territory, Union Councils

== December ==
- 1 December: India, Uttar Pradesh, Village Heads and Village Councils (2nd phase)
- 2 December: Guernsey, Saint Peter Port North, Parliament by-election
- 3 December: United Kingdom, Oldham West and Royton, House of Commons by-election
- 5 December:
  - Australia, North Sydney, House of Representatives by-election
  - India
    - Jharkhand, District Councils, Township Councils and Village Councils (3rd phase)
    - Uttar Pradesh, Village Heads and Village Councils (3rd phase)
  - Nigeria
    - Bayelsa, Governor
    - Kogi, Governor (revote in 91 precincts)
  - Pakistan
    - Punjab, Metropolitan Corporations, Municipal Corporations and Municipal Committees, District Councils and Unions Councils (3rd phase)
    - Sindh, Metropolitan Corporations, District Municipal Corporations, Municipal Corporations, Municipal Committees, Town Committees, Union Committees, District Councils and Union Councils (3rd phase)
      - Karachi, Union Councils
- 6 December:
  - France
    - Regional Councils (1st round)
      - Guadeloupe, Regional Council (1st round)
      - Réunion, Regional Council (1st round)
    - Corsica, Assembly (1st round)
    - French Guiana, Assembly (1st round)
    - Martinique, Assembly (1st round)
  - Mexico, First Federal Electoral District of Aguascalientes, Chamber of Deputies by-election
- 8 December: Federated States of Micronesia, Pohnpei, Governor (2nd round)
- 9 December:
  - India
    - Tripura, Municipal Corporation, Municipal Councils and Town Councils
    - Uttar Pradesh, Village Heads and Village Councils (4th phase)
  - Indonesia, Governors, Regents and Mayors
- 12 December:
  - India, Jharkhand, District Councils, Township Councils and Village Councils (4th phase)
  - Saudi Arabia, Municipal Councils
  - Sierra Leone, Bombali, Parliament by-election
  - United States, Houston, Mayor and City Council (2nd round)
- 13 December:
  - Andorra, Municipal Councils
  - France
    - Regional Councils (2nd round)
      - Guadeloupe, Regional Council (2nd round)
      - Réunion, Regional Council (2nd round)
    - Corsica, Assembly (2nd round)
    - French Guiana, Assembly (2nd round)
    - Martinique, Assembly (2nd round)
- 15 December: Ghana, Amenfi West, Parliament by-election
- 18 December: Netherlands, Bonaire, Status referendum
- 19 December:
  - Jordan, Karak's 2nd district, House of Representatives by-election
  - Nigeria, Ekiti, Local Government Councils and Chairmen
  - Zimbabwe, Nkulumane, House of Assembly by-election
- 22 December:
  - India, Madhya Pradesh, Municipal Corporations and Municipal Councils
  - Malawi, Zomba Chisi, National Assembly by-election
- 23 December: Pakistan, NA-154, National Assembly by-election
- 29 December: Liberia, Lofa-2, House of Representatives by-election
- 30 December: Bangladesh, Mayors and Municipal Councils
