= List of elections in 2015 =

== Africa ==
- 2015 Beninese parliamentary election 26 April 2015
- 2015 Burkinabé general election 29 November 2015
- 2015 Burundian legislative election 29 June 2015
- 2015 Burundian presidential election 21 July 2015
- 2015-16 Central African general election 30 December 2015 and 14 February 2016
- 2015 Comorian legislative election 25 January and 22 February 2015
- 2015 Ivorian presidential election 25 October 2015
- 2015 Egyptian parliamentary election 17 October-2 December 2015
- 2015 Ethiopian general election 24 May 2015
- 2015 Liberian by-elections 21 April and 29 December 2015
- 2015 Lesotho general election 28 February 2015
- 2015 Nigerian general election 28–29 March 2015
- 2015 Sudanese general election 13–16 April 2015
- 2015 Tanzanian constitutional referendum 30 April 2015
- 2015 Tanzanian general election 25 October 2015
- 2015 Tanzanian parliamentary election 25 October 2015
- 2015 Togolese presidential election 25 April 2015
- 2015 Zambian presidential election 20 January 2015

== Asia ==
- 2015 Azerbaijani parliamentary election 1 November 2015
- 2015 Egyptian parliamentary election 2 December 2015
- 2015 Bihar Legislative Assembly election October–November 2015
- 2015 Delhi Legislative Assembly election 7 February 2015
- 2015 Taiwanese legislative by-elections 7 February 2015
- 2015 Emirati parliamentary election 3 October 2015
- 2015 Indonesian local elections 9 December 2015
- 2015 Kazakhstani presidential election 26 April 2015
- 2015 Kyrgyz parliamentary election 4 October 2015
- 2014–2016 Lebanese presidential election 23 April 2014–31 October 2016
- 2015 Myanmar general election 8 November 2015
- 2015 Northern Cypriot presidential election 19 April 2015 and 26 April 2015
- 2015 North Korean local elections 19 July 2015
- 2015 Omani general election 25 October 2015
- 2015 Qatari municipal elections 13 May 2015
- 2015 Singaporean general election 11 September 2015
- 2015 Sri Lankan presidential election 8 January 2015
- 2015 Sri Lankan parliamentary election 17 August 2015
- 2015 Tajikistani parliamentary election 1 March 2015
- June 2015 Turkish general election 7 June 2015
- November 2015 Turkish general election 1 November 2015
- 2014–15 Uzbek parliamentary election 4 January 2015 (second round)
- 2015 Uzbekistani presidential election 29 March 2015
- 2015 Hong Kong local elections 22 November 2015

== Middle East ==
- 2015 Israeli legislative election 17 March 2015
- 2015 Saudi Arabian municipal elections 12 December 2015

== Europe ==
- 2015 Albanian local elections 21 June 2015
- 2015 Andorran local elections 13 December 2015
- 2015 Andorran parliamentary election 1 March 2015
- 2015 Liechtenstein local elections 15 March 2015
- 2015 Nagorno-Karabakh parliamentary election 3 May 2015
- 2014–15 Croatian presidential election 28 December 2014 and 11 January 2015
- 2015 Croatian parliamentary election 8 November 2015
- 2015 Bulgarian local elections 25 October 2015 and 5 November 2015
- 2015 Danish general election 18 June 2015
- 2015 Faroese general election 1 September 2015
- 2015 Estonian parliamentary election 1 March 2015
- 2015 Finnish parliamentary election 19 April 2015
- 2015 Åland legislative election 18 October 2015
- 2015 French regional elections 6 and 13 December 2015
- 2015 French departmental elections 22 and 29 March 2015
- 2015 Hamburg state election 2 February 2015
- 2015 Bremen state election 10 May 2015
- 2015 Gibraltar general election 26 November 2015
- January 2015 Greek legislative election 25 January 2015
- 2014–15 Greek presidential election 17, 23, and 29 December 2014 and 18 February 2015
- September 2015 Greek legislative election 20 September 2015
- 2015 Italian presidential election 29–31 January 2015
- 2015 Italian local elections 31 May 2015
- 2015 Dutch provincial elections 18 March 2015
- 2015 Kazakhstani presidential election 26 April 2015
- 2015 Spanish local elections 24 May 2015
- 2015 Latvian presidential election 3 June 2015
- 2015 Maltese local elections 11 April 2015
- 2015 Moldovan local elections 14 June 2015
- 2015 Norwegian local elections 14 September 2015
- 2015 Polish presidential election 10 and 24 May 2015
- 2015 Polish parliamentary election 25 October 2015
- 2015 Portuguese legislative election 4 October 2015
- 2015 Madeira regional election 29 March 2015
- 2015 Catalan parliamentary election 27 September 2015
- 2015 Spanish general election 20 December 2015
- 2015 Swiss federal election 18 October 2015
- June 2015 Turkish general election 7 June 2015
- November 2015 Turkish general election 1 November 2015
- 2015 Ukrainian local elections 25 October and 15 November 2015
- 2015 United Kingdom general election 7 May 2015

== North America ==
=== Canada ===
- 2015 Canadian federal election 19 October 2015

=== Mexico ===
- 2015 Mexican legislative election 7 June 2015

=== United States ===
- 2015 Charlotte mayoral election 3 November 2015
- 2015 Chicago mayoral election 24 February 2015
- 2015 Dallas mayoral election 9 May 2015
- 2015 Houston mayoral election 12 December 2015
- 2015 Indianapolis mayoral election 3 November 2015
- 2015 Memphis mayoral election 8 October 2015
- 2015 Philadelphia mayoral election 3 November 2015
- 2015 Salt Lake City mayoral election 3 November 2015
- 2015 Kentucky gubernatorial election 3 November 2015
- 2015 Louisiana gubernatorial election 21 November 2015
- 2015 Mississippi gubernatorial election 3 November 2015

== Oceania ==
=== Australia ===
- 2015 Queensland state election 31 January 2015
- 2015 New South Wales state election 28 March 2015

=== Federated States of Micronesia ===
- 2015 Micronesian parliamentary election 3 March 2015

=== Kiribati ===
- 2015-16 Kiribati parliamentary election 30 December 2015 and 7 January 2016

=== Tuvalu ===
- 2015 Tuvaluan general election 31 March 2015

== Caribbean ==
- 2015-16 Haitian parliamentary election 9 August 2015, 25 October 2015, and 20 November 2016
- 2015 Haitian presidential election 25 October 2015
- 2015 Saint Kitts and Nevis general election 16 February 2015
- 2015 Trinidad and Tobago general election 7 September 2015

== Central America ==
- 2015 Belizean general election 4 November 2015
- 2015 Guatemalan general election 6 September and 25 October 2015

== South America ==
- 2015 Venezuelan parliamentary election 6 December 2015
- 2015 Argentine general election 25 October and 22 November 2015
- 2015 Guyanese general election 11 May 2015
- 2015 Surinamese general election 25 May 2015
- 2015 Uruguayan municipal elections 10 May 2015

== See also ==
- Local electoral calendar 2015
- National electoral calendar 2015
- Supranational electoral calendar 2015
