= 2015 national electoral calendar =

National and federal elections held in 2015

- Countries with national elections or referendums: Executive Legislative Executive and Legislative Referendum Executive and Referendum Legislative and Referendum Executive, Legislative and Referendum

This national electoral calendar for 2015 lists the national/federal elections held in 2015 in all sovereign states and their dependent territories. By-elections are excluded, though national referendums are included.

== January ==
- 4 January: Uzbekistan, Legislative Chamber (2nd round)
- 8 January: Sri Lanka, President
- 11 January: Croatia, President (2nd round)
- 20 January: Zambia, President
- 25 January:
  - Comoros, Parliament (1st round)
  - Greece, Parliament

== February ==
- 7 February: Slovakia, Referendum
- 16 February: Saint Kitts and Nevis, Parliament
- 22 February: Comoros, Parliament (2nd round)
- 28 February: Lesotho, National Assembly

== March ==
- 1 March:
  - Andorra, Parliament
  - El Salvador, Parliament
  - Estonia, Parliament
  - Tajikistan, Assembly of Representatives
- 3 March: Federated States of Micronesia, Parliament
- 8 March: Switzerland, Referendums
- 17 March: Israel, Parliament
- 28–29 March: Nigeria, President, House of Representatives and Senate
- 29 March: Uzbekistan, President
- 31 March: Tuvalu, Parliament

== April ==
- 11 April: Malta, Referendum
- 13–15 April: Sudan, President and National Assembly
- 19 April:
  - Finland, Parliament
  - Northern Cyprus, President (1st round)
- 22 April: Anguilla, Legislature
- 25 April: Togo, President
- 26 April:
  - Benin, Parliament
  - Kazakhstan, President
  - Northern Cyprus, President (2nd round)

== May ==
- 3 May: Nagorno-Karabakh, Parliament
- 7 May: United Kingdom, House of Commons
- 8 May: Norfolk Island, Referendum
- 10 May: Poland, President (1st round)
- 11 May:
  - Guyana, President and Parliament
- 22 May: Ireland, Constitutional Referendums
- 24 May:
  - Ethiopia, House of Peoples' Representatives
  - Poland, President (2nd round)
- 25 May: Suriname, Parliament

== June ==
- 7 June:
  - Luxembourg, Referendum
  - Mexico, Chamber of Deputies
  - Turkey, Parliament
- 8 June: British Virgin Islands, Legislature
- 14 June: Switzerland, Referendums
- 18 June: Denmark, Parliament
- 29 June: Burundi, National Assembly

== July ==
- 5 July: Greece, Referendum
- 21 July: Burundi, President

== August ==
- 9 August: Haiti, Chamber of Deputies (all 119 seats) and Senate (20/30 seats), (1st round)
- 17 August: Sri Lanka, Parliament

== September ==
- 1 September: Faroe Islands, Legislature
- 6 September:
  - Guatemala, President (1st round) and Parliament
  - Poland, Referendum
- 7 September: Trinidad and Tobago, House of Representatives
- 11 September: Singapore, Parliament
- 20 September: Greece, Parliament

== October ==
- 3 October: United Arab Emirates, Parliament
- 4 October:
  - Kyrgyzstan, Parliament
  - Portugal, Parliament
- 11 October:
  - Belarus, President
  - Guinea, President
- 17–19 October: Egypt, Parliament (1st phase 1st round)
- 18 October: Switzerland, National Council and Council of States (1st round)
- 19 October: Canada, House of Commons
- 25 October:
  - Argentina, President (1st round), Chamber of Deputies and Senate
  - Bulgaria, Referendum
  - Guatemala, President (2nd round)
  - Haiti, ~~President (1st round)~~ (election nullified), Chamber of Deputies (25/119 seats 1st round revote; 86/119 seats 2nd round) and Senate (6/30 seats 1st round revote; 12/30 seats 2nd round)
  - Ivory Coast, President
  - Oman, Consultative Assembly
  - Poland, Sejm and Senate
  - Republic of the Congo, Constitutional Referendum
  - Tanzania, President and Parliament
- 26–28 October: Egypt, Parliament (1st phase 2nd round)

== November ==
- 1 November:
  - Azerbaijan, Parliament
  - Turkey, Parliament
- 2 November: Switzerland, Council of States (2nd round 1st phase)
- 4 November:
  - Belize, House of Representatives
  - Pitcairn Islands, Deputy Mayor and Legislature
- 8 November:
  - Croatia, Parliament
  - Myanmar, House of Representatives and House of Nationalities
  - Switzerland, Council of States (2nd round 2nd phase)
- 15 November: Switzerland, Council of States (2nd round 3rd phase)
- 16 November: Marshall Islands, Parliament
- 20 November – 11 December: New Zealand, Referendum (1st round)
- 21–23 November: Egypt, Parliament (2nd phase 1st round)
- 22 November:
  - Argentina, President (2nd round)
  - Switzerland, Council of States (2nd round 4th phase)
- 26 November: Gibraltar, Legislature
- 29 November:
  - Burkina Faso, President and Parliament
  - Transnistria, Parliament
- 30 November – 2 December: Egypt, Parliament (2nd phase 2nd round)

== December ==
- 3 December: Denmark, Referendum
- 3–5 December: Seychelles, President (1st round)
- 6 December:
  - Armenia, Referendum
  - Venezuela, Parliament
- 9 December: Saint Vincent and the Grenadines, Parliament
- 13 December: Liechtenstein, Referendum
- 13–14 December: Central African Republic, Referendum
- 16–18 December: Seychelles, President (2nd round)
- 18 December: Rwanda, Referendum
- 20 December:
  - Slovenia, Referendum
  - Spain, Congress of Deputies
- 30 December:
  - Central African Republic, President (1st round)
  - Kiribati, Parliament (1st round)

== Indirect elections ==
The following indirect elections of heads of state and the upper houses of bicameral legislatures took place through votes in elected lower houses, unicameral legislatures, or electoral colleges:

- 23 April 2014 – 31 October 2016: Lebanon, President (17 rounds in 2015)
- 10 January: Afghanistan, House of Elders
- 13–14 January: Uzbekistan, Senate
- 29–31 January: Italy, President
- 7 February, 20 April, and 28 September: India, Council of States
- 18 February: Greece, President
- 5 March: Pakistan, Senate
- 16 March, 6 May and 22 June: Isle of Man, Legislative Council
- 1 April: San Marino, Captains Regent
- 17 April: Tajikistan, National Assembly
- 11 May: Federated States of Micronesia, President
- 14 May: Guatemala, Vice President
- 19 May: Sudan, Council of States
- 24 May: Ethiopia, House of Federation
- 26 May: Netherlands, Senate
- 3 June: Latvia, President
- 4 June: Mauritius, President
- 16 June, 9 July, 23 October and 24 November: Austria, Federal Council
- 14 July: Suriname, President
- 24 July: Burundi, Senate
- 16 September: Guatemala, Vice President
- 1 October: San Marino, Captains Regent
- 2 October: Morocco, House of Councillors
- 12 October: Fiji, President
- 28 October: Nepal, President
- 27 November: Namibia, National Council
- 9 December: Switzerland, Federal Council
- 20 December: Spain, Senate
- 29 December:
  - Algeria, Council of the Nation
  - Madagascar, Senate

== See also ==
- 2015 in politics
