= Kemet the Phantom =

American rapper, DJ, and producer

Kemet Coleman, previously known by stage name Kemet the Phantom, is a Kansas City-based rapper, producer, urbanist and entrepreneur.

== Public attention ==
While Coleman has released at least 10 albums, his most well-known roles are as the official DJ for UMKC basketball program and as the creator in 2016 of a song entitled "Get Out," the video for which was set entirely on the then-brand-new KC Streetcar. Before the UMKC role and the streetcar video, Coleman had received press coverage primarily for collaborating musically with Kyle James, the son of Kansas City mayor Sly James.

== Critical response ==
The Atlantic praised "Get Out," describing it as "just way better than any promotional song for a modestly scaled Midwest city’s streetcar line has any right to be."

The Pitch had good words for Coleman's song "Suite Life", calling it "a solid track to promote Kemet the Phantom's upcoming The Invisible Man album."

== Personal life ==
Coleman's father was born in Mississippi and grew up in St. Louis. His mother is from New Orleans.
