= Cehl Meeah =

Mauritian politician

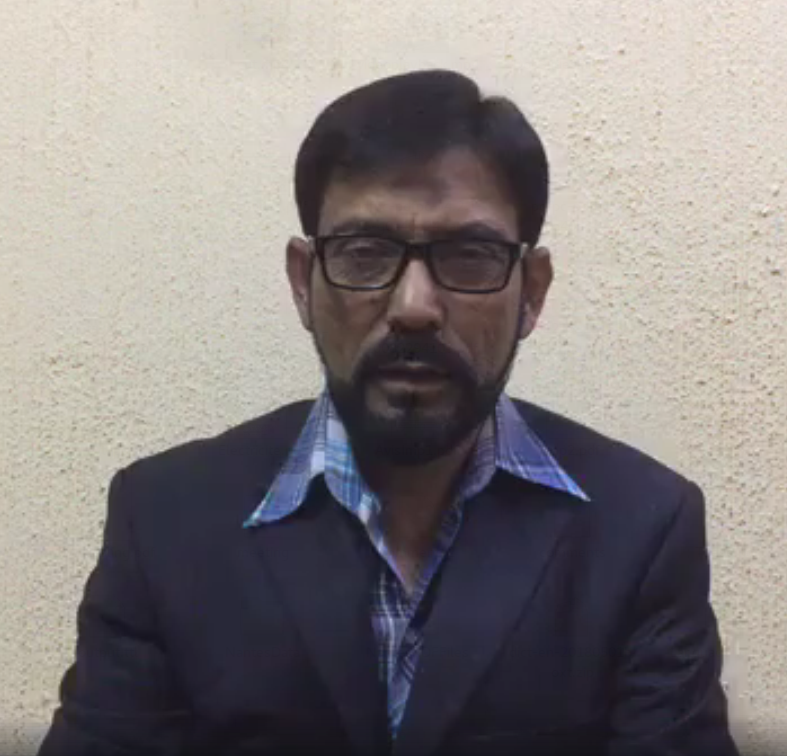
- Born: 14 March 1958 (age 68); Port Louis, Mauritius
- Education: Umm al-Qura University, Mecca, Saudi Arabia
- Era: Municipal Counseller ~ 07 October 2001 – 02 October 2005 Member of Parliament ~ 05 May 2010 – 10 December 2014 Leader of FSM ~ 1991 – present Amir of Hizbullah ~ 1982 – present
- Known for: Elections in Mauritius, Politics of Mauritius, Government of Mauritius
- Political party: Mauritian Solidarity Front (1990–present)

Cehl Meeah (born Cehl Fakeemeeah, 1958) is a Mauritian politician who is the leader of the Mauritian Solidarity Front.

== Early life and education ==
Cehl Meeah was born on 14 March 1958 in Port Louis in a middle-class Islamic conservative family. His grandfather was a congregational leader for more than 40 years. Being fluent in the Quran in his early ages, he started teaching the Quran in the local masjid at the age of 13. By the age of 16/17, he was already leading preaching in different study circles as well as leading congregation prayers in one mosque in Port Louis. He attended Royal College Port Louis from 1969 to 1974 and continued his studies at John Kennedy College till 1976. During his secondary studies at John Kennedy College, Cehl struggled for obtaining a special place for accomplishing the daily Islamic prayers and special Friday prayers. After his studies at John Kennedy College, he headed to continue his Islamic studies in Lucknow where he also met some prominent Islamic scholars like Abul A'la Maududi. During this period, he obtained a scholarship for studying Islamic Jurisprudence & Usul-al-fiqh at Umm al-Qura University of Makka, Saudi Arabia.

After returning completed his bachelor studies in Islamic jurisprudence from Saudi Arabia, he returned to Mauritius and founded Jamaat-Ul-Muslimeen and Dar-ul-Maarif primary & secondary school located at Curepipe. In 2012, he inaugurated The Quranic Institute in Stanley, Rose Hill & in 2016 he inaugurated Markaz Tahfeez Ul Quraan in Curepipe, where students stay in the Markaz in order to learn and memorise the Quraan . He has many centres in different parts of Mauritius such as Plain Magnien, Chemin Grenier and La Caverne
