= 2015 Mauritian municipal elections =

- 14 June 2015

Municipal elections were held in Mauritius on 14 June 2015, to determine the composition of the municipal councils of the city of Port Louis, and the towns of Beau Bassin-Rose Hill, Curepipe, Quatre Bornes and Vacoas-Phoenix. Initially expected to be held in 2018, Prime Minister Anerood Jugnauth called early elections, shortly after the upset victory of his Alliance Lepep at the 2014 parliamentary polls. The municipal elections took place following the passage of amendments to the Local Government Act, which saw the increase of all seats on the councils from a combined 90 to 120. The Labour Party declined to contest the elections, while its coalition partner, the Mauritian Militant Movement (MMM), participated but was affected by infighting.

Alliance Lepep, which comprised the Militant Socialist Movement (MSM), Parti Mauricien Social Démocrate (PMSD) and Muvman Liberater, secured all seats on the five municipal councils, including in the MMM stronghold of Beau Bassin-Rose Hill. The coalition, however, received less than 50% of the combined popular vote across the municipalities. The MMM garnered 31% but lost all its seats. The elections saw low voter turnout, with only 35% of the electorate participating, a decrease from 44% in 2012 and the lowest since 1991.

== Background ==
During the previous municipal elections, held on 9 December 2012, the then-opposition Remake 2000 alliance, comprising the MMM and MSM, won a majority of seats on the councils of Quatre Bornes and Port Louis, and secured all 18 seats in Beau Bassin-Rose Hill. The Labour-led alliance, which also included the PMSD, and controlled all five councils before the election, only maintained its majority in Vacoas-Phoenix. The two coalitions were tied in Curepipe; however, Labour retained control of this council after it struck a deal with Mouvement Mauricien Social Democrate (MMSD), which secured one seat. Voter turnout across the five municipalities reached 44%, a slight increase from 40% in 2005. The 2012 elections were the first municipal polls to be held since a female quota took effect earlier that year, which mandated that women make up no less than one-third of contestants in local elections.

The alliances later shifted, with the MMM entering a coalition with the Labour Party, and the MSM forming Alliance Lepep with the PMSD and Muvman Liberater. Alliance Lepep won the 2014 snap parliamentary election in an upset, defeating Prime Minister Navin Ramgoolam's Labour-led coalition. Shortly after assuming office, the Alliance Lepep government, led by Prime Minister Anerood Jugnauth, scheduled early municipal elections in 2015, seeking to capitalise on its parliamentary victory and the opposition being in a state of disarray.

== Electoral system ==
The elections were conducted using the plurality block voting system. Amendments to the Local Government Act, which Jugnauth's government introduced shortly before the elections, resulted in an increase in the number of seats on all five municipal councils from a combined 90 to 120. All council wards would thereafter return four members instead of three. As such, the membership of the Municipal City Council of Port Louis rose from 24 to 32, with the capital having eight wards. Seats on the Municipal Town Councils of Beau Bassin-Rose Hill and Vacoas-Phoenix each increased from 18 to 24, with both towns having six wards. The Municipal Town Councils of Curepipe and Quatre Bornes, on the other hand, each expanded from 15 to 20 members and had five wards. Alliances and groups that fielded more than two candidates were required to ensure that two-thirds of their contestant lineup was not of the same gender. If a group did not comply with the gender quota in a municipality, its candidates, while still allowed to contest the elections, could only run as independents.

The president of Mauritius, on the advice of the prime minister, sets the dates of the municipal elections. Eligible candidates had to be least 18 years old and residents of the municipality in which they run. Voters were also required to be at least 18 years old to register. A total of 395,961 individuals across the five municipalities were registered to vote in the elections. After the elections, each council elects a mayor and a deputy mayor. All electors were required to show a form of identification before voting.

== Groups and candidates ==
A total of 539 candidates, including 174 women, were registered to contest the elections across the five municipalities, an increase from 347 in 2012. Port Louis had the largest share of candidates, at 188. Curepipe was the only other municipality to have over 100 contestants, with 107, followed by 89 in Vacoas-Phoenix and 85 in Quatre Bornes. Beau Bassin-Rose Hill had 70 candidates, the fewest among the municipalities. Prime Minister Jugnauth's Alliance Lepep, comprising the MSM, ML, and the PMSD, fielded 120 candidates. The MMM, led by Paul Bérenger, participated in the elections despite the absence of its coalition partner, the Labour Party, and emerged as the other major bloc alongside Alliance Lepep. The Rezistans ek Alternative party, led by Ashok Subron, was the only bloc, aside from Alliance Lepep and the MMM, to contest all five municipalities.

The contestant lists of the Mauritius Independent Party and the People's Movement in Quatre Bornes, and the lineup of the Mauritian Solidarity Front in Vacoas-Phoenix, failed to meet the quota in these municipalities. As a result, their candidates in these areas had to run as independents. The Labour Party declined to contest the elections, with Ramgoolam citing the party's financial issues due to the state investigating his accounts. The Labour leader also claimed the elections would not be free and fair, and that voters risked facing repercussions for supporting his party. Unlike in previous elections, the political party affiliation of candidates contesting under the banner of an alliance was listed on the ballot.

Major blocs Group/alliance		Bloc leader
Militant Socialist Movement	Alliance Lepep	Anerood Jugnauth
Muvman Liberater	Alliance Lepep	Anerood Jugnauth
Parti Mauricien Social Démocrate	Alliance Lepep	Anerood Jugnauth
Mauritian Militant Movement	—N/a	Paul Bérenger

== Campaign ==
Many groups reportedly had a lower presence during the campaign period than in the 2014 parliamentary election. The two major blocs, Alliance Lepep and the MMM, frequently clashed during the campaign, and many of the contesting groups reportedly had similar platforms. Prime Minister Jugnauth did not actively campaign, delegating the task to other senior members of Alliance Lepep. Jugnauth expressed concern about potential low voter turnout and stated that municipal residents who refused to cast a ballot should be stripped of their voting rights. The MMM contested the elections at a time it was suffering from internal divisions, stemming from the party's defeat in the 2014 parliamentary election and some members expressing discontent at Bérenger's refusal to step down as party leader. Coupled with the Labour Party's absence, observers predicted that the elections would witness low voter turnout. Many dissatisfied MMM supporters reportedly preferred to abstain rather than vote for Alliance Lepep or other alternatives. The Rezistans ek Alternativ party presented itself as a "credible alternative" to the major blocs, with Subron stating it was the only left-wing group contesting all municipalities.

Alliance Lepep campaigned on increasing autonomy for each municipal council. Included in the bloc's manifesto were plans to implement a smart city model, with free Wi-Fi in designated areas, aimed at increasing internet access, especially in working-class neighbourhoods. The alliance also promised to construct pedestrian zones in each municipality, which would be utilised for cultural, commercial and artistic events, and to build hawker centres to accommodate street vendors. Jugnauth claimed the MMM was not campaigning as a single group and that it had maintained a tacit alliance with the Labour Party, which Bérenger denied.

Despite the MMM's internal turmoil, Bérenger expressed confidence in the party's chances and believed the elections would deliver a rebound for the MMM. The party highlighted its governing record on the councils, referring to the "innovative era" from 1977 onwards when the MMM came to power in many municipalities, and characterised the years before, when the PMSD was in the majority, as the "dark years". The party also criticised alleged corruption in the Alliance Lepep government, promising more accountability and transparency. Included in the MMM's platform were proposals to improve the waste collection system and restoring each council's financial independence.

== Conduct ==
President Kailash Purryag issued the election writs on 4 May. The nomination day for contestants to register their candidacies occurred on 23 May, and had until 26 May to withdraw if they intended to do so. Groups that failed to comply with the gender quota had two hours after nominations closed at 15:00 to implement the required changes or risk disqualification. Days before the election, MMM MP Reza Uteem and several MMM candidates, including Lord Mayor Jenito Seedoo, were reportedly assaulted by MSM members in the Tranquebar neighbourhood of Port Louis. One of alleged attackers implicated was Mahmad Jaunbaccus, the husband of Alliance Lepep MP Roubina Jaddoo. The group, which had gone to inquire about illegal posters claiming the MMM had received money from the British American Investment Company, subsequently filed a police report. Uteem denounced the violence and urged MMM supporters to remain calm. The MSM members also accused the present MMM lawmakers of assault. On election day, polling stations were open from 7:00 to 18:00. By midday, voter turnout had reached only an average of 11%, and Electoral Commissioner Irfan Rahman said many polling stations were virtually deserted. Vote counting began the day after the election. Citing an intention to increase transparency, Rahman announced that each polling station would display the results on a board as vote counting took place, a practice he said was inspired by the conduct of elections in Madagascar.

== Results ==
Alliance Lepep secured a landslide victory, winning all 120 seats on the municipal councils. The elections, however, saw an overall low voter turnout, with only 35% of eligible electors casting a ballot, a nine-point decrease from 44% in 2012, and the lowest since 1991. Despite achieving a clean sweep, the bloc garnered less than 50% of the vote across the five municipalities. The MMM placed second in most wards, behind Alliance Lepep, and received a combined 31%, but lost all its seats. Most MMM candidates were defeated by a margin of over 1,000 votes in numerous wards.

=== Port Louis ===
In Port Louis, Alliance Lepep won all 32 council seats, with the MSM winning 16, the PMSD receiving 10, while the other six went to Muvman Liberater. Lord Mayor Seedoo of the MMM was among the defeated councillors, while two of his predecessors, Mahmad Kodabaccus of the PMSD and Muvman Liberater's Gérard Grivon, won seats. Ten women were elected to the council.

Group or alliance		Votes	%	Seats
Alliance Lepep	Militant Socialist Movement	37,407	25.42	16
Alliance Lepep	Parti Mauricien Social Démocrate	22,817	15.51	10
Alliance Lepep	Muvman Liberater	13,404	9.11	6
Alliance Lepep	Total	73,628	50.04	32
Mauritian Militant Movement		47,920	32.57	0
Mauritian Solidarity Front		10,425	7.09	0
Rezistans ek Alternativ		4,519	3.07	0
Mouvement Authentique Mauricien		1,705	1.16	0
Muvman Travayis Militant		1,187	0.81	0
Front Liberation National		514	0.35	0
Forum des Citoyens Libres		513	0.35	0
Les Verts Fraternels		440	0.30	0
Parti Malin		422	0.29	0
Independents		5,858	3.98	0
Total		147,131	100.00	32
Valid votes		147,131	99.74	
Invalid/blank votes		385	0.26	
Total votes		38,159	–	
Registered voters/turnout		113,270	33.69	
Source: OEC

On 23 June, the newly inaugurated Port Louis councillors elected Mohammad Khooleegan of the MSM as lord mayor, and Chris Loïc Dick of the PMSD as deputy lord mayor.

=== Beau Bassin-Rose Hill ===
In Beau Bassin-Rose Hill, Alliance Lepep secured all 24 council seats, with the MSM winning nine, Muvman Liberater receiving eight, while seven went to the PMSD. The MMM failed to win any seats, suffering its worst defeat since 2005, in a municipality that was widely considered to be a stronghold of the party.

Group or alliance		Votes	%	Seats
Alliance Lepep	Militant Socialist Movement	21,274	19.87	9
Alliance Lepep	Muvman Liberater	19,459	18.18	8
Alliance Lepep	Parti Mauricien Social Démocrate	17,230	16.10	7
Alliance Lepep	Total	57,963	54.15	24
Mauritian Militant Movement		43,043	40.21	0
Rezistans ek Alternativ		3,213	3.00	0
Les Verts Fraternels		1,252	1.17	0
Four Cats Political Party		255	0.24	0
Mouvement Authentique Mauricien		237	0.22	0
Independents		1,080	1.01	0
Total		107,043	100.00	24
Valid votes		107,043	99.80	
Invalid/blank votes		212	0.20	
Total votes		27,570	–	
Registered voters/turnout		77,707	35.48	
Source: OEC

The Beau Bassin-Rose Hill councillors were sworn in on 22 June. That day, the council elected Ken Fong of Muvman Liberater as mayor, and Alain Cerveaux of the MSM as deputy mayor.

=== Curepipe ===
In Curepipe, Alliance Lepep toppled the MMM's control over the municipality, winning all 20 council seats. The MSM and PMSD each captured eight seats, while four went to Muvman Liberater. Éric Guimbeau, the sole MMSD councillor who emerged as kingmaker after the previous election, lost re-election to his seat in ward 4 by a margin of 17 votes.

Group or alliance		Votes	%	Seats
Alliance Lepep	Militant Socialist Movement	18,686	22.20	8
Alliance Lepep	Parti Mauricien Social Démocrate	17,965	21.34	8
Alliance Lepep	Muvman Liberater	8,605	10.22	4
Alliance Lepep	Total	45,256	53.76	20
Mauritian Militant Movement		18,638	22.14	0
Mouvement Mauricien Social Démocrate		12,668	15.05	0
Muvman Travayis Militant		2,924	3.47	0
Rezistans ek Alternativ		2,825	3.36	0
Parti Malin		936	1.11	0
Mauritian Solidarity Front		131	0.16	0
Mouvement Authentique Mauricien		124	0.15	0
Independents		679	0.81	0
Total		84,181	100.00	20
Valid votes		84,181	99.76	
Invalid/blank votes		200	0.24	
Total votes		21,671	–	
Registered voters/turnout		62,228	34.83	
Source: OEC

On 25 June, the Curepipe councillors were sworn in. That day, the council elected Nathalie Gopee of the PMSD as mayor, and Devindranath Bhurosah of the MSM as deputy mayor.

=== Quatre Bornes ===
In Quatre Bornes, Alliance Lepep captured all 20 council seats, with the MSM securing 10, the PMSD receiving seven, while three seats went to Muvman Liberater. The alliance ousted the MSM's former coalition partner, the MMM, from the council, with whom they had won a large majority in the municipality in 2012.

Group or alliance		Votes	%	Seats
Alliance Lepep	Militant Socialist Movement	24,244	29.10	10
Alliance Lepep	Parti Mauricien Social Démocrate	17,324	20.80	7
Alliance Lepep	Muvman Liberater	6,763	8.12	3
Alliance Lepep	Total	48,331	58.01	20
Mauritian Militant Movement		24,283	29.15	0
Voice of Hindu		3,250	3.90	0
Rezistans ek Alternativ		2,501	3.00	0
Forum des Citoyens Libres		1,327	1.59	0
Les Verts Fraternels		662	0.79	0
Front Liberation National		136	0.16	0
Independents		2,818	3.38	0
Total		83,308	100.00	20
Valid votes		83,308	99.78	
Invalid/blank votes		185	0.22	
Total votes		17,868	–	
Registered voters/turnout		48,464	36.87	
Source: OEC

On 26 June, the Quatre Bornes councillors were sworn in. That day, the council elected Atmaram Sonoo of the MSM as mayor, and Arline Koenig of the PMSD as deputy mayor.

=== Vacoas-Phoenix ===
In Vacoas-Phoenix, with Alliance Lepep securing all 24 council seats, a majority went to the MSM, which won 16, while Muvman Liberater and the PMSD each received four seats. The MMM candidates placed immediately behind the victorious Alliance Lepep contestants in all wards, except ward 1, where Menon Yetty, an independent former mayor and former Labour Party member, placed fifth. Yetty lost out on securing the ward's fourth seat by a margin of 113 votes.

Group or alliance		Votes	%	Seats
Alliance Lepep	Militant Socialist Movement	47,431	38.87	16
Alliance Lepep	Muvman Liberater	11,768	9.64	4
Alliance Lepep	Parti Mauricien Social Démocrate	10,603	8.69	4
Alliance Lepep	Total	69,802	57.20	24
Mauritian Militant Movement		36,679	30.06	0
Rezistans ek Alternativ		4,659	3.82	0
Parti Malin		1,231	1.01	0
Rassemblement Socialiste Mauricien		124	0.10	0
Independents		9,542	7.82	0
Total		122,037	100.00	24
Valid votes		122,037	99.78	
Invalid/blank votes		269	0.22	
Total votes		31,984	–	
Registered voters/turnout		83,389	38.36	
Source: OEC

The Vacoas-Phoenix councillors were sworn in on 23 June. That day, the council elected Navin Ramsoondur of the MSM as mayor, and Muvman Liberater's Rajen Kanaksabee as deputy mayor.

== Aftermath ==
The elections saw a voter abstention rate of 65%, a significant contrast to the 74% turnout at the 2014 parliamentary election. Many municipal residents reportedly declined to participate due to the diminished authority of the councils and the short timespan between the 2015 polls and the 2014 parliamentary and 2012 municipal elections. Prime Minister Jugnauth stated he was pleased with the election outcome and said a starkly different result would have been a "great personal discouragement" for him. Bérenger attributed the MMM's defeat to the post-parliamentary election scandals, infighting within the party and the MMM having allied with the Labour Party before the 2014 election. The MMM leader also said Alliance Lepep outspent his party by "millions of rupees" and highlighted how two-thirds of the electorate did not vote. Rezistans ek Alternativ, which received a combined 7% across the five municipalities, expressed satisfaction with the result. The party characterised the high abstention rate as a protest against traditional parties, and said the country was in a phase of political transition. Subron called on these parties to publicise their revenues.

The MMSD filed an electoral petition in July 2015, challenging the result in ward 4 of Curepipe. The group requested a recount and called on the Supreme Court to authorise the electoral commission to scrutinise all ballots in the ward, including those that were invalidated. The MMSD also demanded that the court declare the Alliance Lepep candidates' election in ward 4 null and void. Guimbeau claimed the printing of the ballots had caused confusion among voters. He stated that the ballots contained two blank spaces that were on both sides of the MMSD's election symbol, leading many electors to cross both boxes, or the wrong one, resulting in the invalidation of these votes. The Supreme Court rejected the MMSD's case in 2017, determining that it lacked evidence for irregularities that could have affected the election outcome.
