= 2015 supranational electoral calendar =

Calendar for supranational elections held in 2015

This supranational electoral calendar for 2015 lists the supranational elections held in 2015.

== October ==
- 15 October: United Nations Security Council, Security Council
- 25 October: Argentina, Parlasur election

== September ==
- 6 September: Guatemala, Elections for the Central American Parliament
- 15 September: United Nations Human Rights Council, Human Rights Council
