= Elections in Papua New Guinea =

Papua New Guinea elects on the national level a legislature. The National Parliament has 111 members, elected for a five-year term in single-seat constituencies. Papua New Guinea has a multi-party system, with numerous parties in which no one party often has a chance of gaining power alone, and parties must work with each other to form coalition governments. The first-past-the-post voting system was previously used, but in 2002 the limited instant-runoff voting system was enacted into law and first used during the 2007 national election and 2008 local elections.

== Electorates ==
Members of Parliament represent the 111 single-member electorates. The 20 provinces, the Autonomous Region of Bougainville and the National Capital District each elect a governor, who is also a representative in the parliament. Additionally there are 89 local ("Open") electorates, of which three are in the National Capital District and 86 are in the provinces, with boundaries of the latter corresponding directly to administrative districts.

The Electoral Boundaries Commission, reporting in February 2006, suggested an additional 26 Open electorates be created. Legally, electoral boundaries must be reviewed every ten years, but due to political instability, no review occurred for 30 years. The future of the provincial electorates is under debate.

Lady Carol Kidu, after being elected as the only female Member of Parliament in the 2007 general election, called for seats to be reserved for women to improve the representation of women in Parliament. She suggested that the 20 provincial seats could be reserved for women by the 2012 election.

== Electoral system ==
Candidates are elected using limited instant-runoff voting where the voter has to rank 3 candidates, known locally as Limited preferential voting. A candidate has to have the majority of votes to be elected. If no one has an absolute majority of first preference votes, the candidates with the fewest votes are eliminated, and the votes are transferred to the voters next preferred candidate until one candidate has at least half of the remaining votes. The current system was first used for a by-election in 2003, and subsequently for the 2007 Elections. Previously, first-past-the-post voting was used.

== See also ==
- Electoral calendar
- Electoral system
