= 2015 Bonaire status referendum =

- 18 December 2015
- Do you agree with the current status, which is a direct link to the Netherlands?

Results
Choice	Votes	%
Yes	2,649	34.45%
No	5,040	65.55%
Valid votes	7,689	98.60%
Invalid or blank votes	109	1.40%
Total votes	7,798	100.00%
Registered voters/turnout	12,661	61.59%

A non-binding status referendum was held in Bonaire on 18 December 2015. Voters were asked "Do you agree with the current status, which is a direct link to the Netherlands?" As a majority voted no, a second referendum on the preferred status will be held.

== Campaign ==
The "yes" campaign argued that for the vast majority, Bonaire was better off than ever before, and that a no vote would result in instability. The "no" campaign opposed the imposition of secularism by Dutch authorities, the legalisation of same-sex marriage and voluntary euthanasia, as well as claiming that there was a lack of respect for Bonaire culture.

== Results ==
Choice	Votes	%
For	2,649	34.45
Against	5,040	65.55
Total	7,689	100.00
Valid votes	7,689	98.60
Invalid/blank votes	109	1.40
Total votes	7,798	100.00
Registered voters/turnout	12,661	61.59
Source: Government of Bonaire
