= Mauritian Solidarity Front =

Political party in Mauritius

Mauritian Solidarity Front Front Solidarité Mauricien
- Leader: Cehl Meeah
- Founder: Cehl Meeah
- Founded: 30 April 1990
- Ideology: Conservatism; Islamism
- Political position: Right-wing to far-right
- Religion: Sunni Islam
- National Assembly of Mauritius: 0 / 66

Party flag

The Mauritian Solidarity Front (French: Front Solidarité Mauricien, FSM) is a political party in Mauritius seeking to represent the nation's Muslim minority. Until 2004, the party was known as Hizbullah (Party of God) (no relation to the Lebanese party Hezbollah). The theocratic party is centered around its leader Cehl M. Fakeemeeah. In 1992, Fakeemeeah announced the party's formation. FSM is also considered to be the successor of Comite Action Musulman (C.A.M.) once led by Sir Abdul Razakh Mohammed. Since the Elections of 2000, FSM was the only Muslim party in Mauritius. FSM became the second-largest Muslim party in Mauritius history.

== Cehl Meeah ==
Cehl Fakeemeeah, known as Cehl Meeah, was born in Mauritius in 1958. He began to teach the Qur'an to children in the local mosque at age 15. At 21, he won a scholarship to Umm Al-Qura University in Makkah, where he studied Islamic jurisprudence and returned to Mauritius in 1991.

When he decided to enter the political arena, his colleagues suggested the name Hizbullah (Party of God), as it could describe his convictions. He participated in some social activities, such as helping the poor and needy of Plaine-Verte, Vallée Pitot and others. He initiated free drug-detoxification programs in response to an increase in trafficking of street drugs in Muslim neighborhoods. He was accused on several occasions by the media of preying on the poor to ramp up his popularity.

== History ==
The Comité Action Musulman won 5 seats in the 1967 general elections. Cehl Meeah collaborated with PTr and Parti Mauricien Social Démocrate (PMSD) to defeat the Mauritian Militant Movement (MMM) after the 1976 general elections. In the 1982 general elections, he continued collaboration with PTr under the banner of National Alliance Party.

Although the Mauritian Islamic Party won 9,334 votes during the 1982 elections and Muslim People's Front won 8,233 votes during the 1995 general elections, after the year 2000, only Hizbullah explicitly represented Muslims in elections. Other small Muslim parties were formed with minimal votes but quickly disappeared. These included the Mauritius Muslim Democratic League and National Mauritian Muslim Rights (initially Mauritian Muslim Rights) in elections held in 1976 and 1983.

Meeah ran for election in 1992, but lost. He ran in the municipal elections in 1995 and was elected municipal counselor. In 1995 having formed Hizbullah, his party won its first seat in the parliament through Imaam Beehary due to "best loser system". Beehary was a preacher at the Noor-e-Islam mosque in Port Louis. Hizbullah failed subsequently to win any seats in the 2000 and 2005 general elections although having gathered many voters throughout the island.

In the 2010 general elections in Mauritius, FSM won 51,161 votes throughout the island and one seat through its leader, Cehl Meeah winning one parliamentary seat.

In the 2014 general elections, he won 41,815 votes.

Meah was defeated in the 2014 general election and in the 2015 municipal elections.

== Controversies ==
Meeah is known to have alleged links with a radical militia known as "l'Escadron de la Mort" which used to burn down whatever they considered disallowed by the Islamic faith in the capital. The militia was responsible for burning down a betting house there, killing 4 people who lived upstairs. In December 2000, Meeah was arrested and accused of involvement in the murders of three Mauritian Militant Movement (MMM) members just before the island's 1996 parliamentary elections. The UK based Islamic Human Rights Commission (IHRC) adopted his case, declaring him a "Prisoner of Faith" and considering his arrest a direct result of his political opposition. It also expressed concerns about his treatment in detention.

Its political views are commonly considered radical and theocratic. FSM wishes to shape politics and governing policy in accord with its religious views. He is known for his strong views on abortion, which he views as an abomination against God. He strongly opposes gay rights and is a strong supporter of proselytism.

On Monday, 5 March 2012, Cehl Meeah was cleared of all charges leveled against him regarding the hold-up at the Bijoulux jewellery shop and he was cleared of any accusations in the case of the room 216 at Victoria Hotel on Wednesday, 7 March 2012.
