= 2015 Chattogram City Corporation election =

Mayoral election in Bangladesh

- 30 April 2015
- Registered: 1,813,449 (▲7.39 pp)
- Turnout: 47.90% (▼6.61pp)
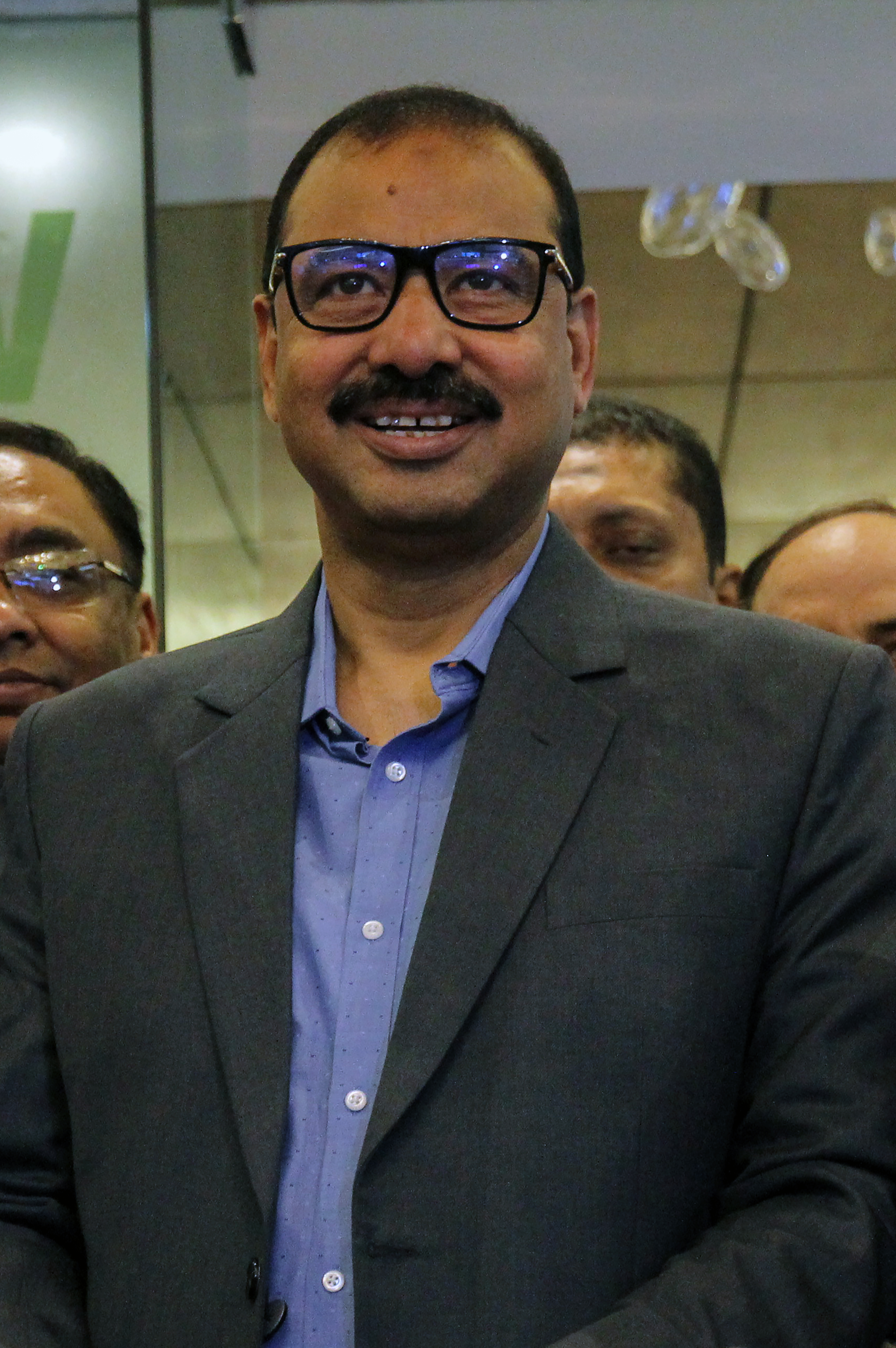

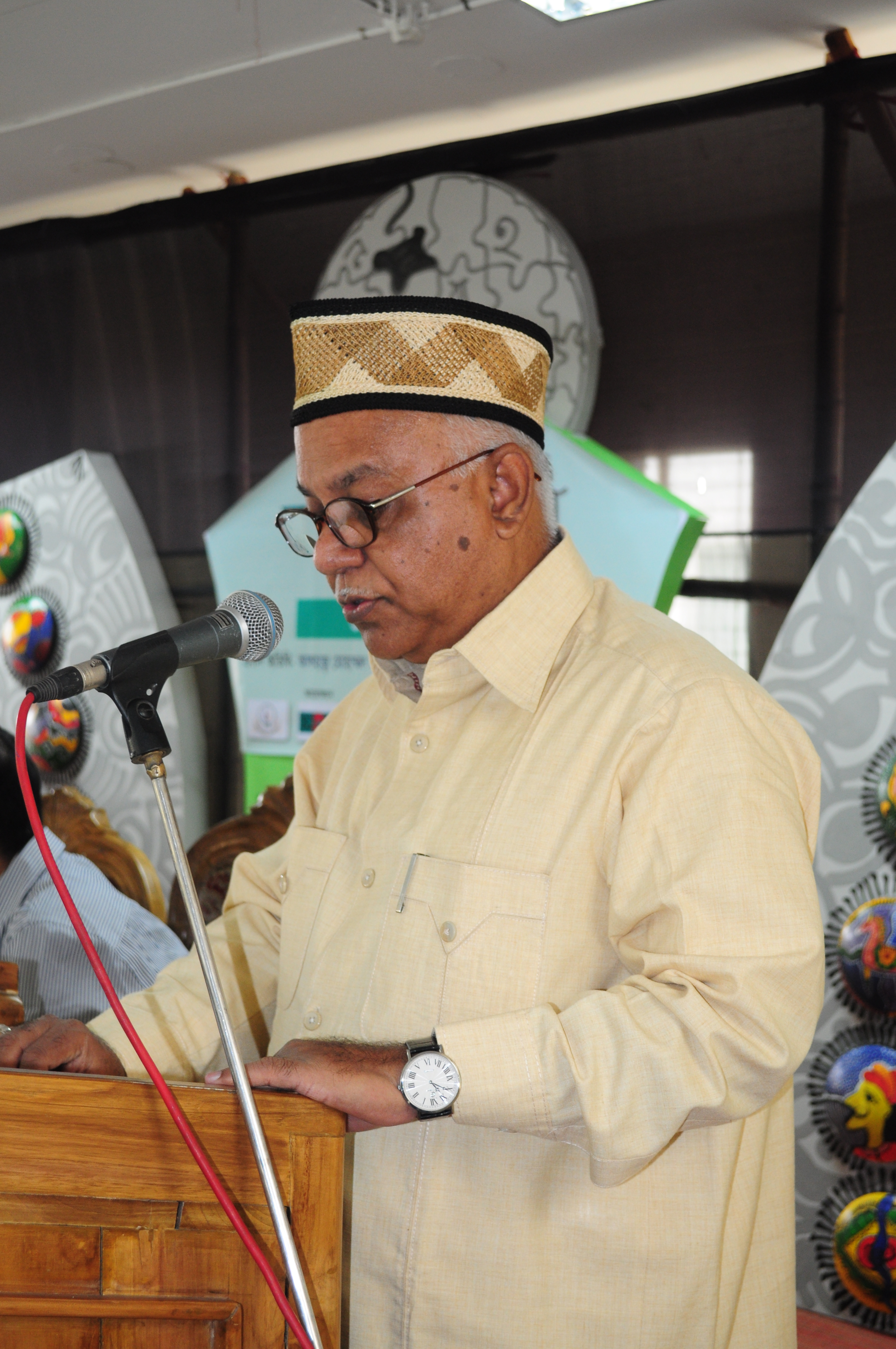
	First party	Second party
Candidate	A J M Nasir Uddin	M. Manjur Alam
Party	AL	BNP
Popular vote	475,361	304,837
Percentage	57.87%	37.11%
Swing	▲14.47pp	▼17.09pp
Mayor before election
M. Manjur Alam
BNP
Elected Mayor
A. J. M. Nasir Uddin
AL
- Council election
- 30 April 2015; 55 seats in the Chattogram City Corporation
Party	Leader	Seats	+/–
AL	A. J. M. Nasir Uddin	46	+14
BNP	M. Manjur Alam	7	−13
Jamaat	Didn't participate	2	0
BSD	Didn't participate	0	−1
Independent	—	0	−1
This lists parties that won seats. See the complete results below.

The 2015 Chattogram City Corporation election was a local government election in the city of Chattogram, Bangladesh, held on 30 April 2015 to elect the mayor of Chittagong and the city council. A total of 12 candidates contested the mayoral race. The election resulted in a victory for the Awami League candidate A J M Nasir Uddin. In the 55-member city council, the Awami League won 46 seats, while the Bangladesh Nationalist Party (BNP) and its allies won 9 seats. However, the results were rejected by the main opposition candidate, Mohammad Manjur Alam of the BNP. The candidates received neutral election symbols in this election.

== Mayoral election results ==
Candidate	Party	Votes	%
A. J. M. Nasir Uddin	Bangladesh Awami League	475,361	57.87
M. Manjur Alam	Bangladesh Nationalist Party	304,837	37.11
M A Matin	Bangladesh Islami Front	11,655	1.42
Wazez Hossain Bhuyia	Islami Andolan Bangladesh	9,668	1.18
Solaiman Alam Seth	Jatiya Party (Ershad)	6,131	0.75
Mohammed Mujibul Hoque	Independent	4,215	0.51
Saifuddin Ahmed	Independent	2,661	0.32
Alauddin Chowdhury	Independent	2,159	0.26
Arif Moinuddin	Independent	1,774	0.22
Abul Kalam Azad	Independent	1,385	0.17
Sazzad Zoha	Independent	845	0.10
Safiul Alam	Independent	680	0.08
Total		821,371	100.00
Valid votes		821,371	94.56
Invalid/blank votes		47,292	5.44
Total votes		868,663	100.00
Registered voters/turnout		1,813,449	47.90
Awami League gain from BNP			
Source: BD News 24

== Council election results ==
=== Party-wise ===
2015 CCC council election results (party-wise)
Party	Leader	Councilor contested seats	Councilor elected in Seats	Ward Councilors	Reserved Women Councilors
Bangladesh Awami League	A. J. M. Nasir Uddin	55	46 / 55	35	11
Bangladesh Nationalist Party	M. Manjur Alam	43	7 / 55	5	2
Bangladesh Jamaat-e-Islami	Didn't participate	12	2 / 55	1	1
Total			55	41	14
