= 2015 Kanagawa gubernatorial election =

Kanagawa gubernatorial election

- 12 April 2015
- Turnout: 40.71 ▼4.53
Nominee	Yūji Kuroiwa	Hajime Okamoto
Party	Independent	Independent
Popular vote	2,195,760	665,751
Percentage	76.70%	23.30%
Governor before election
Yūji Kuroiwa
Independent
Elected Governor
Yūji Kuroiwa
Independent

The 2015 Kanagawa gubernatorial election was held on 12 April 2015 in order to elect the Governor of Kanagawa. Incumbent Independent Governor Yūji Kuroiwa won re-election against Independent candidate Hajime Okamoto.

== General election ==
On election day, 12 April 2015, incumbent Independent Governor Yūji Kuroiwa won re-election by a margin of 1,530,009 votes against his opponent Independent candidate Hajime Okamoto, thereby retaining Independent control over the office of Governor. Kuroiwa was sworn in for his second term on 23 April 2015.

=== Results ===
Kanagawa gubernatorial election, 2015
Party	Candidate	Votes	%
Independent	Yūji Kuroiwa (incumbent)	2,195,760	76.70
Independent	Hajime Okamoto	665,751	23.30
Total votes		2,861,511	100.00
Independent hold			
