= 2015 Liechtenstein Health Insurance Act referendum =

- 13 December 2015
- Referendum on the Health Insurance Act

Results
| Choice | Votes | % |
|---|---|---|
| Yes | 6,764 | 53.22% |
| No | 5,946 | 46.78% |
| Valid votes | 12,710 | 99.05% |
| Invalid or blank votes | 122 | 0.95% |
| Total votes | 12,832 | 100.00% |
| Registered voters/turnout | 19,649 | 65.31% |
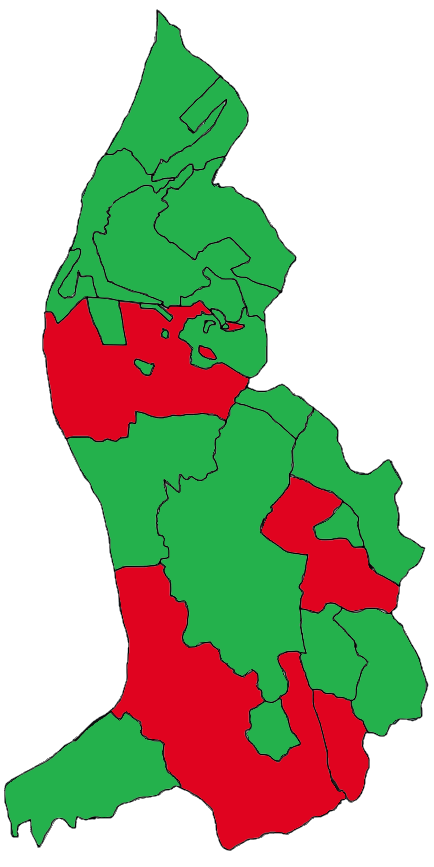
- Results by municipality

A referendum on the Health Insurance Act was held in Liechtenstein on 13 December 2015. It was approved by 53% of voters.

== Background ==
On 1 October 2015 the Landtag voted by 19–6 to amend the Health Insurance Act with the aim of lowering costs. The changes would increase cost sharing by the insured, introduce sanctions against bad service and introduce the Swiss TARMED medical tariff.

The changes were opposed by the "For Liechtenstein 21" group, who collected 2,648 signatures between 7 October and 5 November (Article 66 of the constitution required at least 1,000 signatures to force a referendum). After 2,636 signatures were declared valid, a referendum was announced.

== Results ==
| Choice | Votes | % |
|---|---|---|
| For | 6,764 | 53.22 |
| Against | 5,946 | 46.78 |
| Total | 12,710 | 100.00 |
| Valid votes | 12,710 | 99.05 |
| Invalid votes | 108 | 0.84 |
| Blank votes | 14 | 0.11 |
| Total votes | 12,832 | 100.00 |
| Registered voters/turnout | 19,649 | 65.31 |
Source: Government of Liechtenstein
