= 2015 Kansas City mayoral election =

- June 23, 2015
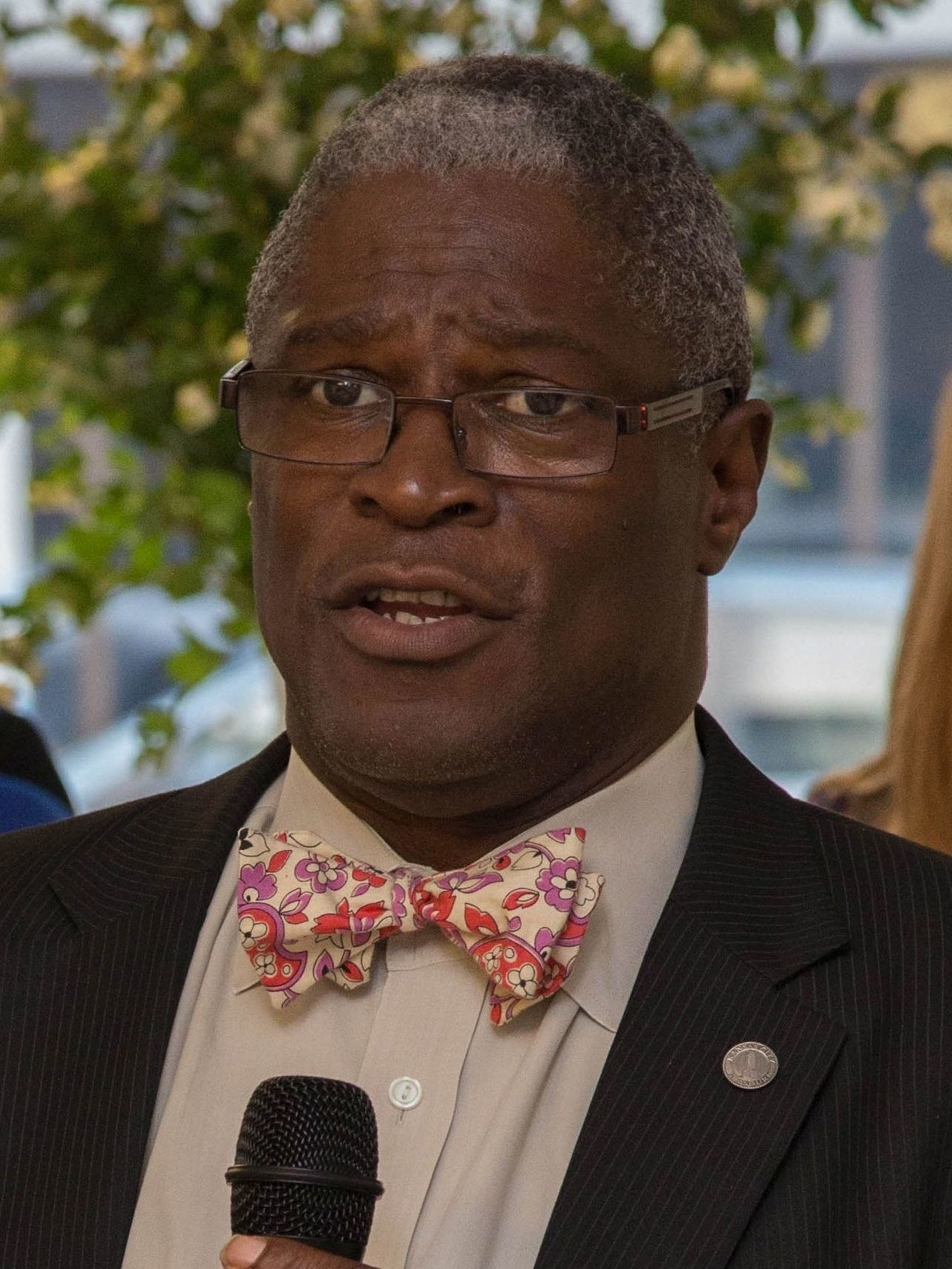

| Candidate | Sly James | Vincent Lee |
| Popular vote | 22,864 | 2,909 |
| Percentage | 88.7% | 11.3% |
Mayor before election
Sly James
Democratic
Elected mayor
Sly James
Democratic

The 2015 Kansas City mayoral election took place on June 23, 2015, to elect the Mayor of Kansas City, Missouri. The election will be held concurrently with various other local elections, and is officially nonpartisan.

Incumbent Mayor Sly James, an Independent in office since 2011, won re-election to a second term in office.

A primary election was held on April 7 to determine the two candidates that moved on to the general election.

== Candidates ==
- Clay Chastain, light rail activist residing in Bedford, Virginia
- Sly James, incumbent Mayor
- Vincent Lee, real estate broker

== Primary election ==
=== Results ===
Kansas City mayoral primary election, 2015
| Party | Candidate | Votes | % |
|---|---|---|---|
| Nonpartisan | Sly James (Incumbent) | 26,910 | 81.5 |
| Nonpartisan | Vincent Lee | 3,502 | 10.6 |
| Nonpartisan | Clay Chastain | 2,423 | 7.3 |
| Nonpartisan | Write-In | 195 | 0.6 |
| Total votes | | 33,030 | 100 |

== General election ==
=== Candidates ===
- Sly James, incumbent Mayor
- Vincent Lee, real estate broker

=== Results ===
Kansas City mayoral general election, 2015
| Party | Candidate | Votes | % |
|---|---|---|---|
| Nonpartisan | Sly James (incumbent) | 29,830 | 87.3 |
| Nonpartisan | Vincent Lee | 4,337 | 12.7 |
| Total votes | | 25,773 | 100 |
