= 2015 Swiss referendums =

Six national referendums were held in Switzerland during 2015, the first of which were held on 8 March.

== March referendums ==
Two referendums were held on 8 March. The family initiative proposal proposed that child and education allowances should be exempt from income tax, whilst second initiative called for the introduction of a tax on non-renewable energy, with the higher cost of energy consumption compensated by the abolition of VAT. The family initiative was initiated by the Christian Democratic People's Party and the energy initiative was initiated by the Green Liberal Party. The Swiss government recommended the rejection of both initiatives, and both were rejected by voters.

The failed energy initiative received worst vote result for an initiative since 1929.

=== Results ===
Question	For		Against		Invalid/ blank	Total votes	Registered voters	Turnout	Cantons for		Cantons against		Result
Question	Votes	%	Votes	%	Invalid/ blank	Total votes	Registered voters	Turnout	Full	Half	Full	Half	Result
Family initiative	537,795	24.6	1,650,109	75.4	22,987	2,210,891	5,254,965	42.07	0	0	20	6	Rejected
Non-renewable energy tax	175,405	8.0	2,010,326	92.0	24,390	2,210,121	5,254,965	41.06	0	0	20	6	Rejected
Source: Government of Switzerland

== June referendums ==
Four referendums were held on 14 June 2015, covering a constitutional amendment regarding reproductive medicine and human gene technology, popular initiatives on scholarships and inheritance tax and a modification of the federal law on radio and television reducing the annual licence fee from 462 to 400 Francs.

=== Results ===
Question	For		Against		Invalid/ blank	Total votes	Registered voters	Turnout	Cantons for		Cantons against		Result
Question	Votes	%	Votes	%	Invalid/ blank	Total votes	Registered voters	Turnout	Full	Half	Full	Half	Result
Reproductive medicine/gene technology	1,377,613	61.9	846,865	38.1	66,515	2,290,993	5,265,120	43.5	17	3	3	3	Accepted
Scholarships	610,284	27.5	1,611,911	72.5	65,360	2,287,555	5,265,120	43.4	0	0	20	6	Rejected
Inheritance tax	657,851	29.0	1,613,982	71.0	29,487	2,301,320	5,265,120	43.7	0	0	20	6	Rejected
Federal law on radio and television	1,128,522	50.1	1,124,873	49.9	44,568	2,297,963	5,265,120	43.6					Accepted
Source: Government of Switzerland 1, 2, 3, 4
