= Sly James =

American politician (born 1951)

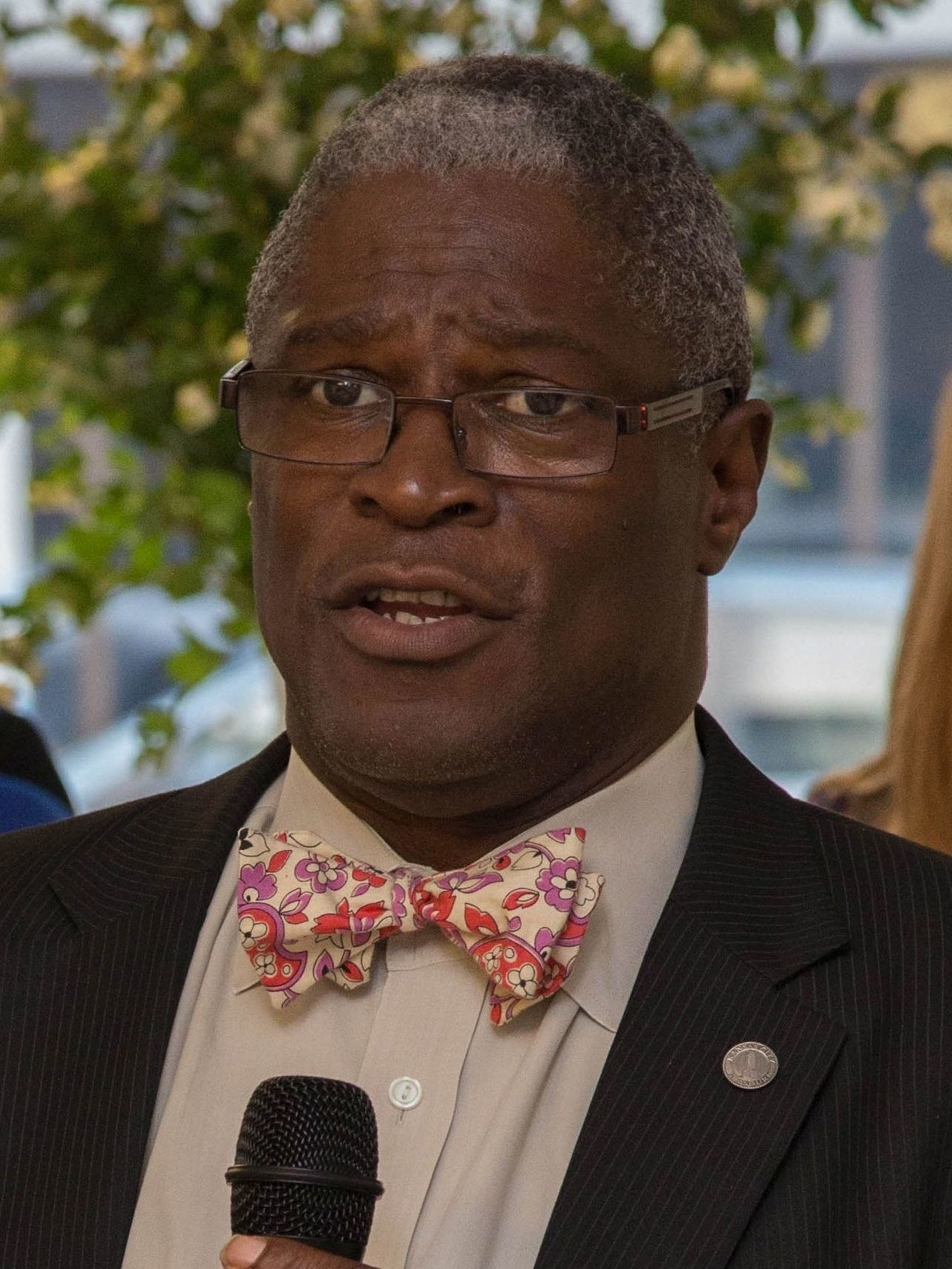

54th Mayor of Kansas City
- In office May 2, 2011 – August 1, 2019
- Preceded by: Mark Funkhouser
- Succeeded by: Quinton Lucas

Personal details
- Born: Sylvester James, Jr. December 9, 1951 (age 74) Kansas City, Missouri, U.S.
- Party: Democratic
- Spouse: Licia Clifton
- Children: 4
- Education: Rockhurst College (BA); Syracuse University; University of Minnesota (JD)
- Website: Official website

Sylvester "Sly" James Jr. (born December 9, 1951) is an American politician who served as the 54th mayor of Kansas City, Missouri from 2011 to 2019. James has lived in Kansas City's Union Hill neighborhood. As mayor, he was known for wearing bow ties.

== Early life, education, and career ==
James grew up on the East side of Kansas City, at 44th Street and Montgall Avenue. He graduated from Bishop Hogan High School in 1969. There, he was the lead singer of the Amelia Earhart Memorial Flying Band (later renamed Manchester Trafficway) from 1965 to 1970. The band was the opening act for Jefferson Airplane when it performed in Kansas City.

In 1971 James joined the Marines and served as a military policeman in California, Japan, and the Philippines; he was honorably discharged in 1975.

He received a Bachelor of Arts degree in English from Rockhurst College in 1980, graduating cum laude. In college, he joined the Tau Kappa Epsilon fraternity. Thereafter, he attended law school at the Syracuse University College of Law from 1980 to 1981, but then transferred to the University of Minnesota Law School, where he received a juris doctor degree in 1983, again graduating cum laude.

After law school, James returned to Kansas City and joined the law firm of Blackwell Sanders Matheny Weary & Lombardi as an associate; in 1990, he became the firm's first African-American partner. In 1993, he and Nancy Kenner left to form their own firm, Kenner & James, P.C., specializing in personal injury, medical malpractice, and nursing home negligence. In 2002 he left to start the Sly James Firm, where he continued to specialize in personal injury and other civil litigation, as well as mediation. Between 1992 and 2002, he served as a member, secretary, and later the president of the Missouri Board of Law of Examiners. In 2003 he served as president of the Kansas City Metropolitan Bar Association.

In 2012 Newsweek / The Daily Beast included James in its list of most innovative mayors for his work in turning Kansas City into the "Silicon Prairie," spurring its entrepreneurial development and for partnering with Google to bring their ultra-high speed broadband network to the city.

== 2011 mayoral election ==
In 2010, despite having held no previous public elected office, James announced his candidacy for mayor of Kansas City in the city's 2011 non-partisan election. In February 2011, he finished first in the primary with 27% of the vote; Kansas City attorney and Platte County resident Mike Burke finished second with 26%, and incumbent mayor Mark Funkhouser finished third, with 21%.

The race for the general runoff election on March 22, 2011, between James and Burke was described as low-key and cordial. Whereas James had been endorsed by the Kansas City Star, Burke had been endorsed by former mayors Charles B. Wheeler, Richard L. Berkley, and Kay Barnes. Ultimately, with only 21 percent of the city's registered voters voting, James defeated Burke by 54 percent to 46 percent. James celebrated his victory at the American Jazz Museum in Kansas City's 18th and Vine District.

James became the second African-American mayor in Kansas City's history, after Emanuel Cleaver.

Kansas City mayoral election, 2011
Party	Candidate	Votes	%
Nonpartisan	Sly James	31,794	62.92
Nonpartisan	Mike Burke	18,736	37.08

== 2011 Plaza shooting incident ==
On August 13, 2011, James and entourage were touring the Country Club Plaza to investigate a request from Highwoods Properties (which manages the buildings in the Plaza) about imposing a 9 p.m. curfew on the Plaza because of unruly teens gathering there at night. During the tour, at about 11:30 p.m., gunfire broke out near 47th Street and Wyandotte Avenue, about 50 yards from the mayor. Three people were shot—two boys, ages 13 and 16, who were shot in the legs; and a 15-year-old girl whose face was grazed by a bullet.

Less than a week after the shooting, the city council, in a 13‑0 vote, approved a curfew in the city. The curfew of 9 p.m. applies from late May through September in five Kansas City entertainment areas (and 10 p.m. elsewhere) for children 15 and under, 11 p.m. for 16- and 17-year-olds. There is a 10 p.m. curfew elsewhere for children 15 and under, and 11 p.m. for those 16 and 17. Other times of the year will have an 11 p.m. curfew on weeknights and midnight on weekends for everyone under age 18.

== 2015 mayoral election ==
James ran for re-election in the city's 2015 mayoral election. He won with 87.3% of the vote.

Kansas City mayoral election, 2015
Party	Candidate	Votes	%
Nonpartisan	Sly James	29,830	87.3
Nonpartisan	Vincent Lee	4,337	12.7

== 2016 White House visit ==
On January 21, 2016, James made an appearance during the White House daily briefing. Josh Earnest, the White House Press Secretary at the time, is a native of Kansas City. Although he is a non-partisan mayor, during his speaking time, James said that "Kansas City has done quite well under this administration". James also complimented Barack Obama's role in preserving race relations within Kansas City. Kansas City's role in startups, such as Google Fiber, was boasted, along with the 2015 World Series victory of the Kansas City Royals.

== 2018 city response to charity meals for the homeless ==
On November 4, 2018, Kansas City health officials seized chili, sandwiches, and soup being distributed to homeless people by the community organization Free Hot Soup. The meals were later soaked in bleach to prevent the homeless from consuming them. James defended the practice, arguing that the city had been unable to determine whether the meals were safe to eat.

== Mayoral term accomplishments ==
- In 2017, city voters approved an $800 million general obligation bond package for infrastructure repair investments, including streets, bridges, sidewalks, flood control, a new animal control shelter, and public building upgrades to meet ADA requirements.
- In 2017, city voters approved a plan for a single airport terminal design to replace the outdated KCI airport terminals.
- James said he is most proud of founding a nonprofit (Turn the Page KC) to help children improve their reading skills by the end of third grade.

== See also ==
- List of mayors of the largest 50 US cities

Political offices
Preceded by Mark Funkhouser	Mayor of Kansas City; 2011–2019	Succeeded by Quinton Lucas
