= Lofa-2 =

Electoral district in Liberia

- Constituency for the House of Representatives of Liberia
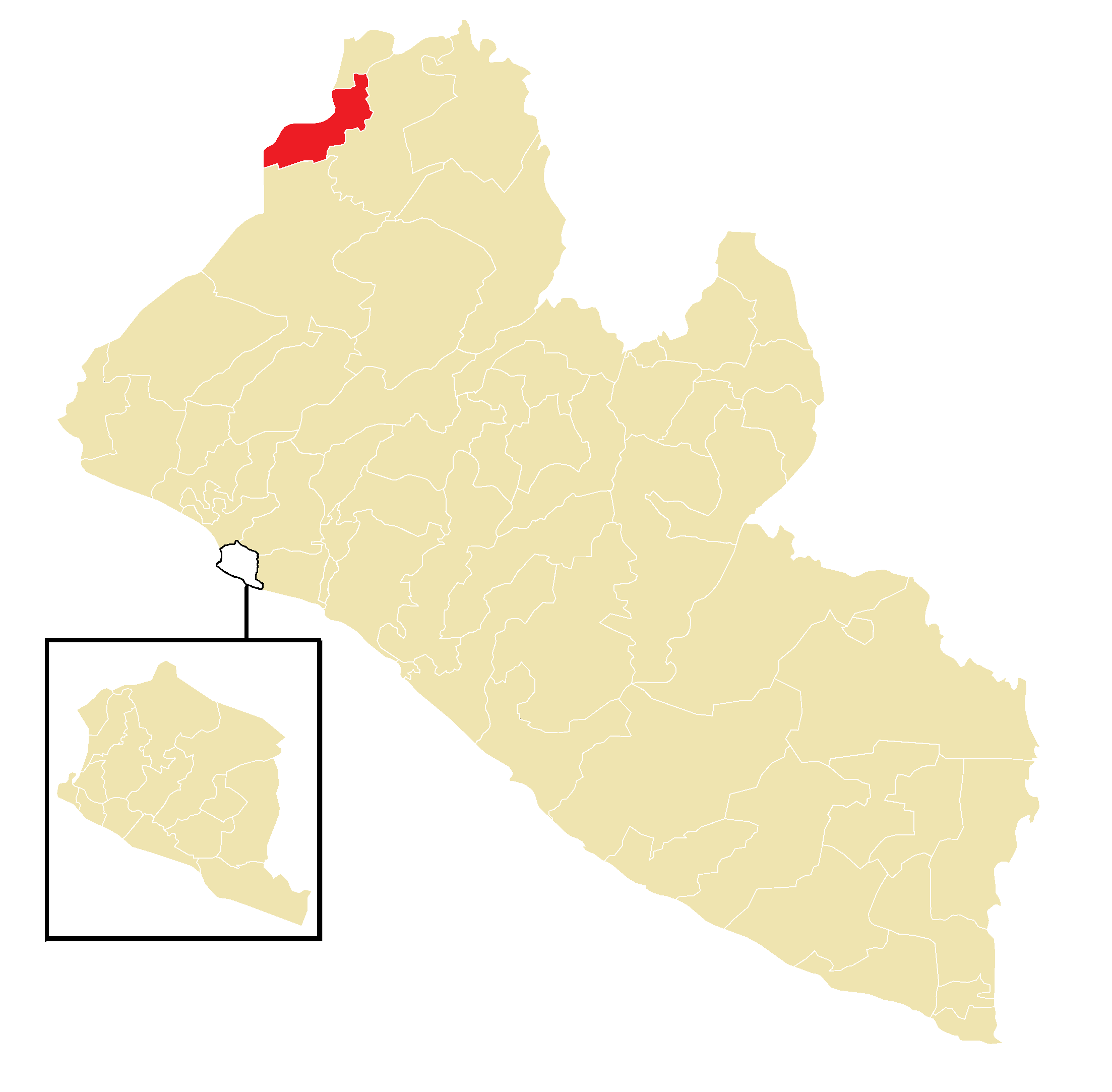
- Electorate: 26,710 (2023)

Current constituency
- Created: 2011
- Representative: Julie Fatorma Wiah

Lofa-2 is an electoral district for the elections to the House of Representatives of Liberia. The constituency covers Vahun District, three communities of Kolahun District (Kamatahun, Popalahun, Lehun) and four communities of Foya District (Foya Tengia, Kpagamai, Yassadu, Kimbaloe).

== Elected representatives ==
Year	Representative elected	Party	Notes
2005	Vaforay Alhaji Musa Kamara	ALCOP	
2011	Fofi S. Baimba	UP	Died in office.
2015	Julie Fatorma Wiah	Ind.	
2017	Julie Fatorma Wiah	Ind.	
2023	Julie Fatorma Wiah	CDC	

== Election results ==
2005 Lofa County's 2nd House District Election
Candidate	Party	Votes	%
Vaforay Alhaji Musa Kamara	All Liberia Coalition Party	2,572	26.06
Prince Sao Ngombu	Unity Party	2,115	21.43
Alphonso Boakai Armah	Liberty Party	1,322	13.39
Jackson Ngafua Morlue	Coalition for the Transformation of Liberia	1,135	11.50
Francis Yougbeson Kpadeh Sr.	Progressive Democratic Party	998	10.11
Stephen Ndorbor Kollie	National Patriotic Party	716	7.25
Jeremiah Duwana Sesay	Congress for Democratic Change	623	6.31
Gemiel A. Kamara	National Reformation Party	389	3.94
Total		9,870	100.00
Valid votes		9,870	94.42
Invalid/blank votes		583	5.58
Total votes		10,453	100.00

2011 Lofa County's 2nd House District Election
Candidate	Party	Votes	%
Fofi S. Baimba	Unity Party	5,237	34.88
Momo Siafa Kpoto	Liberty Party	2,746	18.29
Prince Sao Ngombu	Alliance for Peace and Democracy	2,109	14.05
Moisema Kamara	Congress for Democratic Change	1,965	13.09
Vaforay Alhaji Musa Kamara (Incumbent)	All Liberia Coalition Party	1,568	10.44
Vamba Mohammed Dukuly	National Democratic Coalition	1,389	9.25
Total		15,014	100.00
Valid votes		15,014	92.68
Invalid/blank votes		1,185	7.32
Total votes		16,199	100.00

2015 Lofa County's 2nd House District By-election
Candidate	Party	Votes	%
Julie Fatorma Wiah	Independent	1,974	20.11
Augustine Boakai Lansana	Unity Party	1,664	16.95
Molsema Mamara	Congress for Democratic Change	1,573	16.02
Vaforay A. M. Kamara	Independent	1,522	15.51
Jasper Tamba Saiiah Chowoe	Liberty Party	816	8.31
Julia F. Russell	All Liberian Party	670	6.83
Thomas N. Brima Jr.	Liberia National Union	475	4.84
Amara Kaifa Kanneh	Alliance for Peace and Democracy	433	4.41
Moses Armah Saah	Alternative National Congress	433	4.41
Fombah K. Kanneh	All Liberia Coalition Party	256	2.61
Total		9,816	100.00
Valid votes		9,816	96.17
Invalid/blank votes		391	3.83
Total votes		10,207	100.00

2017 Lofa County's 2nd House District Election
Candidate	Party	Votes	%
Julie Fatorma Wiah (Incumbent)	Independent	10,168	47.15
Vaforay A. Musa Kamara	Liberia National Union	4,403	20.42
Abraham B. Samukai	Movement for Economic Empowerment	2,831	13.13
Augustine Boakai Lansana	Grassroot Democratic Party of Liberia	2,276	10.55
Julia Famata Russell	Liberty Party	1,353	6.27
Mohamed A. Sheriff	Alternative National Congress	533	2.47
Total		21,564	100.00
Valid votes		21,564	95.18
Invalid/blank votes		1,093	4.82
Total votes		22,657	100.00
