= List of Karachi local election results =

Detailed results of Karachi, Pakistan, local government elections are tabulated below.

== 1987 Karachi local government elections ==
1987 November 30: Local bodies election held throughout the country. MQM won from all seats at Karachi & Hyderabad.

== 2005 Karachi local government elections ==
The 2005 local government elections individual results are based on claims made by various parties; the official result has not remained as a part of the Election Commission of Pakistan's record.

The following party results are only based on estimate and is not a definite result.

Karachi Local Government Elections, 2005
#	Parties	Panel Name	Seats claimed	Claim 1	Claim 2	Average	Percentage	
1	Muttahida Qaumi Movement	Haq Parast	105	1,362	1,400	1,381	59.0%	
2	Jamaat-e-Islami Pakistan	Al-Khidmat	38	299	500	400	16.4%	
3	Pakistan Peoples Party	Awam Dost	25	202	400	301	12.4%	
4	Awami National Party	Khidmatgar	3	40	100	70	3%	
5	Jamiat Ulema-e-Islam (F)	Insan Dost		31	100	65	2.7%	
6	Pakistan Muslim League (N)	Watan Nawaz		28	80	54	2.2%	
7	Jamiat Ulema Pakistan	Al-Khadim		10	80	45	1.8%	
8	Sunni Tehreek	Insan Dost		-	25	12	0.5%	
9	Pakistan Muslim League (Q)	Khushal Pakistan		-	-	-	-	-
10	Independents			100	100	100	4.1%	
Estimated total			171	2,072	2,785	2,428		
Actual total			178	2,314		5% error		
Turn out				30%	50%	40%		

In contrast to latest elections held in 2015, the mayors were elected in CDGK by direct voting of all elected counsellors and not just nazims or chairmen of a union council/committee. Each union council consisted of 13 members, which gave a total electorate of 2,314 members from 178 union councils.

== 2015 Karachi local government elections ==
There were 209 union committees and 38 union councils in Karachi. Both union councils and union committees are similar in that they are territorial units and composition; the main difference between them is that the union committee represents an urban area whereas the union council represents the rural or suburban areas. Each union council has a union council chairman and one member of the district council. The chairman of each district is selected by the chairmen of union councils and union committees.

The following is the result of union committees in local government election held on 5 December 2015.

Karachi Local Government Election for Union committees, 2015
#	Parties	KMC	Malir	East	West	Central	South	Korangi	Percentage
1	Muttahida Qaumi Movement	135	1	20	21	50	10	33	64.5%
2	Pakistan Peoples Party	24	5	4	4	1	10	-	11.5%
3	Pakistan Muslim League (N)	19	4	1	9	-	4	1	9.2%
4	Pakistan Tehreek-e-Insaf	10	-	2	4	-	2	2	4.8%
5	Jamaat-e-Islami Pakistan	7	1	2	3	-	1	-	3.5%
6	Jamiat Ulema-e-Islam (F)	1	1	-	-	-	-	-	0.5%
7	Awami National Party	1	-	-	1	-	-	-	0.5%
8	Jamiat Ulema-e-Islam	1	-	-	1	-	-	-	0.5%
9	Independents	11	1	2	3	-	4	1	5.2%
Total		209	13	31	46	51	31	37	100%
Polled votes		2,517,265							36%
Total votes		6,972,454							100%

There was a total of 99 seats reserved in four different categories for the union committees and all 308 members of the union committee select the mayor and deputy mayor of Karachi. The mayoral election was held on 24 August 2016. Waseem Akhtar was elected as the city's mayor by securing 196 out of 294 (305 total) votes in his favor. The Pakistan Peoples Party candidate secured second position with 98 votes.

The Pakistan Peoples Party won the majority of the seats in union councils. The following is the result of Karachi union councils in the local government election held on 5 December 2015.

Karachi Local Government Union council Election, 2015
#	Parties	Total	Malir	West	Percentage
1	Muttahida Qaumi Movement	0	-	-	0%
2	Pakistan Peoples Party	19	16	3	50%
3	Pakistan Muslim League (N)	1	1	-	2.63%
4	Pakistan Tehreek-e-Insaf	0	-	-	0%
5	Jamaat-e-Islami Pakistan	0	-	-	0%
6	Jamiat Ulema-e-Islam (F)	1	1	-	2.63%
7	Awami National Party	0	-	-	0%
8	Pak Mus Alliance	1	1	-	2.63%
9	Independents	16	13	3	42.1%
Total		38	32	4	100%

The election for the chairman of the District Council was held on 24 August 2016. In the district council elections, Abdullah Murad Baloch from the Pakistan Peoples Party received 35 votes out of 56 (57 total) and was elected as the District Council chairman.

== See also ==
- Mayor of Karachi
