= 2015 Liberian by-elections =

The 2015 Liberian by-elections were held on April 21 and December 29 in Rivercess-2 and Lofa-2 respectively. The Rivercess by-election was caused by the election of a member of the House of Representatives to the Senate. The Lofa by-election was caused by the death of a member of the House. The opposition Movement for Progressive Change candidate Byron Zahnwea was elected in Rivercess, and independent candidate Julie Fatorma Wiah was elected in Lofa.

== Background ==
=== Rivercess County ===
A Senate election was held on December 20, 2014. Francis Paye successfully ran on the National Democratic Coalition (NDC) ticket to represent Rivercess County in the Senate. Paye was a sitting member of the House, representing Rivercess County's 2nd district, and resigned to fill his Senate seat. On January 22, 2015, the speaker of the House sent a notification of the resultant vacancy in the chamber to the National Elections Commission (NEC). The election was scheduled to take place on April 21.

On March 10, the NEC released a provisional list of 10 candidates for the by-election. On March 25, all 10 candidates were certified. The candidates were as follows: Charles Bartee of the Congress for Democratic Change (CDC), G. Thomas Doue of the Alternative National Congress (ANC), Jerry Floh Greene of the ruling Unity Party (UP), Gabriel Paul of the National Patriotic Party (NPP), Jerome Garmonblo Reeves of the Union of Liberian Democrats (ULD), Matthew Wally of the Liberty Party (LP), Lucky T. K. Wesseh of the NDC, Kofi Bob Zah of the People's Unification Party (PUP), Byron Zahnwea of the Movement for Progressive Change (MPC), and independent candidate Hilary Flomo Mentoe.

From April 10 to 11, LP national leader Charles Brumskine, along with other notable LP leaders, held a notable, large campaign event for Wally in Cestos. FrontPage Africa reported that Wally seemed to be a forerunner for the Rivercess by-election, while also noting that Zanhwea had a notable following in the district. Official campaigning activities for the by-election ended on April 19.

On April 15, the NEC announced that ballots for the election had arrived on April 13. The NEC also reported that they had received no complaints of misbehavior by any of the candidates. There were 26 international observers accredited to observe the by-election.

=== Lofa County ===
Fofi Sahr Baimba, who represented Lofa County's 2nd House district, died on September 13, 2015. Baimba was a member of the ruling UP. The NEC was notified of the resultant vacancy in the House of Representatives on October 6. On October 19, the NEC announced the election was scheduled to be held on December 29.

The deadline to nominate candidates for the by-election was November 6. The NEC qualified ten candidates for the by-election, with a list being published on November 23. The list of candidates were as follows: Thomas N. Brima Jr. of the Liberia National Union (LINU), Jasper Tamba Saiiah Chowoe of the LP, Molsema Mamara of the CDC, Amara Kaifa Kanneh of the Alliance for Peace and Democracy (APD), Fombah K. Kanneh of the All Liberia Coalition Party (ALCOP), Augustine Boakai Lansana of the UP, Julia F. Russell of the All Liberian Party (ALP), Moses Armah Saah of the ANC, and independent candidates Vaforay A. M. Kamara and Julie Fatorma Wiah. The official campaign for the by-election started on November 23 and ended on December 27.

== Aftermath ==
=== Rivercess County ===
The by-election in Rivercess's 2nd House district was held on April 21 as planned. According to the United Nations Mission in Liberia, the by-election was "conducted peacefully". Tallied results were released on April 22, with final results to be released on April 24. On April 24, the MPC's Byron Zahnwea was declared the winner of the election by the NEC. LP nominee Matthew Wally was in second place. Zahnwea was certificated by the NEC on May 6.

=== Lofa County ===
The by-election in Lofa County's 2nd House district was held on December 29. The final results of the election were announced on December 31, with independent Julie Fatorma Wiah as the winner. She was certificated by the NEC on January 2, 2016.

== Results ==
The following results for the Rivercess by-election incorporate tallied results released by the NEC on April 22, 2015, as well reporting by FrontPage Africa of an event held by the NEC on April 24. The Lofa by-elections results are from the NEC.

In the Rivercess County by-election the voter turnout was about 42%, with a total 6,722 votes cast out of 16,003 registered voters. In the Lofa County by-election, there was a voter turnout of around 32.64%, with a total 10,207 votes cast out of 31,273 registered voters.

2015 Rivercess County's 2nd House District By-election
Candidate	Party	Votes	%
Byron Zahnwea	Movement for Progressive Change	1,583	24.65
Matthew Wally	Liberty Party	1,468	22.86
Hilary Flomo Mentoe	Independent	808	12.58
Kofi Bob Zah	People's Unification Party	790	12.30
Charles Bartee	Congress for Democratic Change	646	10.06
G. Thomas M. Doue	Alternative National Congress	543	8.46
Lucky T. K. Wesseh	National Democratic Coalition	315	4.91
Jerome Garmonblo Reeves	Union of Liberian Democrats	122	1.90
Jerry Floh Greene	Unity Party	99	1.54
Gabriel Paul	National Patriotic Party	48	0.75
Total		6,422	100.00
Valid votes		6,422	95.54
Invalid/blank votes		300	4.46
Total votes		6,722	100.00
MPC gain from NDC			

2015 Lofa County's 2nd House District By-election
Candidate	Party	Votes	%
Julie Fatorma Wiah	Independent	1,974	20.11
Augustine Boakai Lansana	Unity Party	1,664	16.95
Molsema Mamara	Congress for Democratic Change	1,573	16.02
Vaforay A. M. Kamara	Independent	1,522	15.51
Jasper Tamba Saiiah Chowoe	Liberty Party	816	8.31
Julia F. Russell	All Liberian Party	670	6.83
Thomas N. Brima Jr.	Liberia National Union	475	4.84
Amara Kaifa Kanneh	Alliance for Peace and Democracy	433	4.41
Moses Armah Saah	Alternative National Congress	433	4.41
Fombah K. Kanneh	All Liberia Coalition Party	256	2.61
Total		9,816	100.00
Valid votes		9,816	96.17
Invalid/blank votes		391	3.83
Total votes		10,207	100.00
Independent gain from UP			
