= Elections in Guatemala =

Elections in Guatemala include, on the national level, a head of state – the president – and a unicameral legislature. Guatemala's president and vice-president are elected on one ballot for a four-year term by the people.

The Congress of the Republic (Congreso de la República) has 158 members, elected for a four-year term, partially in multi-member departmental constituencies and partially by proportional representation both using the D'Hondt method.

Guatemala also elects deputies to the supranational Central American Parliament.

== Political culture ==
Political parties in Guatemala are generally numerous and unstable. No party has won the presidency more than once. In every election period the majority of the parties are small and newly formed.

== Schedule ==
=== Election ===
Position	2015	2016	2017	2018	2019
Type	Presidential (September); National Congress (September); Gubernatorial (September)	None			Presidential (June); National Congress (June); Gubernatorial (June)
President and vice president	President and vice president	None			President and vice president
National Congress	All seats	None			All seats
Provinces, cities and municipalities	All positions	None			All positions

=== Inauguration ===
Position	2016	2017	2018	2019	2020
Type	Presidential (January); National Congress (January); Gubernatorial (January)	None			Presidential (January); National Congress (January); Gubernatorial (January)
President and vice president	14 January	None			14 January
National Congress	14 January	None			14 January
Provinces, cities and municipalities	15 January	None			15 January

== See also ==
- Politics of Guatemala
