= List of new members of the 92nd United States Congress =

The 92nd United States Congress began on January 3, 1971. There were eight new senators (three Democrats, four Republicans, one Conservative) and 51 new representatives (31 Democrats, 20 Republicans) at the start of the first session. Additionally, five senators (four Democrats, one Republican) and 10 representatives (four Democrats, six Republicans), as well as one new delegate (a Democrat), took office on various dates in order to fill vacancies during the 92nd Congress before it ended on January 3, 1973.

Due to redistricting in New York, two representatives were elected from newly established congressional districts.

== Senate ==
=== Took office January 3, 1971 ===
State	Image	Senator	Seniority	Switched party	Prior background	Birth year	Ref
Connecticut		Lowell Weicker (R)	6th (98th overall)	Yes; Replaced Thomas J. Dodd (D), who was defeated in a primary (Note: Dodd ran in the general election as an independent and was subsequently defeated by Weicker.)	U.S. House of Representatives (Note: Elected to the 91st Congress, serving from 1969 to 1971 in Connecticut's 4th district.); Connecticut House of Representatives; First Selectman of Greenwich; U.S. Army Reserve	1931	
Florida		Lawton Chiles (D)	8th (100th overall)	No; Open seat; replaced Spessard Holland (D)	Florida Senate; Florida House of Representatives; U.S. Army Lieutenant	1930	
Maryland		J. Glenn Beall Jr. (R)	5th (97th overall)	Yes; Defeated Joseph Tydings (D)	U.S. House of Representatives (Note: Elected to the 91st Congress, serving from 1969 to 1971 in Maryland's 6th district.); Maryland House of Delegates; U.S. Navy	1927	
Minnesota		Hubert Humphrey (DFL)	1st (93rd overall)	No; Open seat; replaced Eugene McCarthy (DFL)	Vice President of the United States; U.S. Senate (Note: Previously elected to the 81st Congress, serving from 1949 to 1964.); Mayor of Minneapolis	1911	
New York		James L. Buckley (C)	7th (99th overall)	Yes (Note: Buckley joined the Republican Party in 1976, during the 94th Congress.); Defeated Charles Goodell (R)	Director of the Catawba Corp. U.S. Navy Lieutenant	1923	
Ohio		Robert Taft Jr. (R)	2nd (94th overall)	Yes; Open seat; replaced Stephen M. Young (D)	U.S. House of Representatives (Note: Elected to the 88th Congress, serving from 1963 to 1965 in Ohio's at-large district; elected again to the 90th United States Congress, serving from 1967 to 1971 in Ohio's 1st district.); Ohio House of Representatives	1917	
Tennessee		Bill Brock (R)	3rd (95th overall)	Yes; Defeated Albert Gore Sr. (D)	U.S. House of Representatives (Note: Elected to the 88th Congress, serving from 1963 to 1971 in Tennessee's 3rd district.); U.S. Navy	1930	
Texas		Lloyd Bentsen (D)	4th (96th overall)	No; Defeated Ralph Yarborough (D) in a primary	U.S. House of Representatives (Note: Elected to the 80th Congress, serving from 1948 to 1955 in Texas's 15th district.); Hidalgo County Judge; U.S. Air Force Colonel	1921	

=== Took office during the 92nd Congress ===
State	Image	Senator	Took office	Switched party	Prior background	Birth year	Ref
Georgia		David H. Gambrell (D)	February 1, 1971	No; Appointed; replaced Richard Russell Jr. (D)	Chair of the Democratic Party of Georgia; Director of the NLADA; U.S. Army Reserve	1929	
Vermont		Robert Stafford (R)	September 16, 1971	No; Appointed; replaced Winston L. Prouty (R)	U.S. House of Representatives (Note: Elected to the 87th Congress, serving from 1961 to 1971 in Vermont's at-large district.); Governor of Vermont; Lieutenant Governor of Vermont; Vermont Attorney General; U.S. Navy Reserve Captain	1913	
Louisiana		Elaine Edwards (D)	August 1, 1972	No; Appointed; replaced Allen J. Ellender (D)	First Lady of Louisiana	1929	
Georgia		Sam Nunn (D)	November 8, 1972	No; Defeated David H. Gambrell (D) in a primary	Georgia House of Representatives; U.S. Coast Guard Reserve	1938	
Louisiana		J. Bennett Johnston (D)	November 14, 1972	No; Open seat; replaced Elaine Edwards (D)	Louisiana State Senate; Louisiana House of Representatives; U.S. Army J.A.G. Corps	1932	

== House of Representatives ==
=== Took office January 3, 1971 ===
District	Representative	Switched party	Prior background	Birth year	Ref
Alaska at-large	Nick Begich Sr. (D)	Yes	State Senator	1932	
California 7	Ron Dellums (D)	No	City Councillor	1935	
California 29	George E. Danielson (D)	No	State Senator	1915	
California 38	Victor Veysey (R)	Yes	State Assemblyman	1915	
Colorado 1	Mike McKevitt (R)	Yes	District Attorney	1928	
Connecticut 1	William R. Cotter (D)	No	Insurance Commissioner	1926	
Connecticut 4	Stewart McKinney (R)	Yes	State Representative	1931	
Connecticut 6	Ella Grasso (D)	Yes	Secretary of the State of Connecticut	1919	
Delaware at-large	Pete du Pont (R)	No	State Representative	1935	
Florida 8	Bill Young (R)	No	State Senator	1930	
Georgia 2	Dawson Mathis (D)	No	News director	1940	
Illinois 1	Ralph Metcalfe (D)	No	City Councillor	1910	
Illinois 3	Morgan F. Murphy (D)	No	Lawyer	1932	
Indiana 4	J. Edward Roush (D)	Yes	U.S. Representative (Note: Previously elected to the 86th Congress, serving from 1959 to 1969 in the 5th district.)	1920	
Indiana 5	Elwood Hillis (R)	No	State Representative	1926	
Kansas 2	William R. Roy (D)	Yes	Physician	1926	
Kentucky 3	Romano Mazzoli (D)	Yes	State Senator	1932	
Maryland 4	Paul Sarbanes (D)	No	State Delegate	1933	
Maryland 6	Goodloe Byron (D)	Yes	State Senator	1929	
Maryland 7	Parren Mitchell (D)	No	Activist	1922	
Massachusetts 3	Robert Drinan (D)	No	Priest	1920	
Massachusetts 9	Louise Day Hicks (D)	No	City Councillor	1916	
Minnesota 3	Bill Frenzel (R)	No	State Representative	1928	
Minnesota 7	Robert Bergland (DFL)	Yes	USDA official	1928	
Montana 1	Richard G. Shoup (R)	Yes	Mayor of Missoula	1923	
Nebraska 1	Charles Thone (R)	No	State Party Chair	1924	
Nebraska 2	John Y. McCollister (R)	No	County Commissioner	1921	
New Mexico 2	Harold L. Runnels (D)	Yes	State Senator	1924	
New York 5	Norman F. Lent (R)	Yes	State Senator	1931	
New York 18	Charles Rangel (D)	No	State Assemblyman	1930	
New York 19	Bella Abzug (D)	No	Co-founder of WSP	1920	
New York 22	Herman Badillo (D)	New seat	Borough President of the Bronx	1929	
New York 25	Peter A. Peyser (R)	Yes	Mayor of Irvington	1921	
New York 27	John G. Dow (D)	Yes	U.S. Representative (Note: Previously elected to the 89th Congress, serving from 1965 to 1969.)	1905	
New York 34	John H. Terry (R)	New seat	State Assemblyman	1924	
New York 39	Jack Kemp (R)	Yes	Professional football player	1935	
North Dakota 2	Arthur A. Link (D–NPL)	Yes	State House Speaker	1914	
Ohio 1	William J. Keating (R)	No	City Councillor	1927	
Ohio 14	John F. Seiberling (D)	Yes	Lawyer	1918	
Ohio 20	James V. Stanton (D)	No	City Council President	1932	
Ohio 24	Walter E. Powell (R)	No	State Senator	1931	
South Carolina 2	Floyd Spence (R)	No	State Senator	1928	
South Dakota 1	Frank E. Denholm (D)	Yes	Corporate counsel	1923	
South Dakota 2	James Abourezk (D)	Yes	Lawyer	1931	
Tennessee 3	LaMar Baker (R)	No	State Senator	1915	
Texas 7	Bill Archer (R)	No	State Representative	1928	
Utah 1	K. Gunn McKay (D)	Yes	State Representative	1925	
Virginia 7	J. Kenneth Robinson (R)	Yes	State Senator	1916	
Washington 4	Mike McCormack (D)	Yes	State Senator	1921	
Wisconsin 1	Les Aspin (D)	Yes	Advisor to Secretary Robert McNamara	1938	
Wyoming at-large	Teno Roncalio (D)	Yes	U.S. Representative (Note: Previously elected to the 89th Congress, serving from 1965 to 1967.)	1916	

=== Took office during the 92nd Congress ===
District	Representative	Took office	Switched party	Prior background	Birth year	Ref
South Carolina 1	Mendel Jackson Davis (D)	April 27, 1971	No	Congressional staffer	1942	
Maryland 1	William Oswald Mills (R)	May 25, 1971	No	Congressional staffer	1924	
Pennsylvania 18	John Heinz (R)	November 2, 1971	No	Businessman	1938	
Kentucky 6	William P. Curlin Jr. (D)	December 4, 1971	No	State Representative	1933	
Vermont at-large	Richard W. Mallary (R)	January 7, 1972	No	State Senator	1929	
Alabama 3	Elizabeth B. Andrews (D)	April 4, 1972	No	Teacher	1911	
Illinois 15	Cliffard D. Carlson (R)	April 4, 1972	No	Manufacturer	1915	
Pennsylvania 27	William Sheldrick Conover (R)	April 25, 1972	No	Insurance broker	1928	
Louisiana 7	John Breaux (D)	September 30, 1972	No	Congressional staffer	1944	
Virginia 6	M. Caldwell Butler (R)	November 7, 1972	No	State Delegate	1925	

==== Non-voting members ====
District	Delegate	Took office	Switched party	Prior background	Birth year	Ref
District of Columbia at-large	Walter Fauntroy (D)	March 23, 1971	New seat	Civil rights leader	1933	

== See also ==
- List of United States representatives in the 92nd Congress
- List of United States senators in the 92nd Congress

== Notes ==
Preceded by New members of the 91st Congress	New members of the 92nd Congress; 1971–1973	Succeeded by New members of the 93rd Congress
