= 92nd United States Congress =

1971–1973 U.S. Congress

| ← | 91st | 93rd | → |
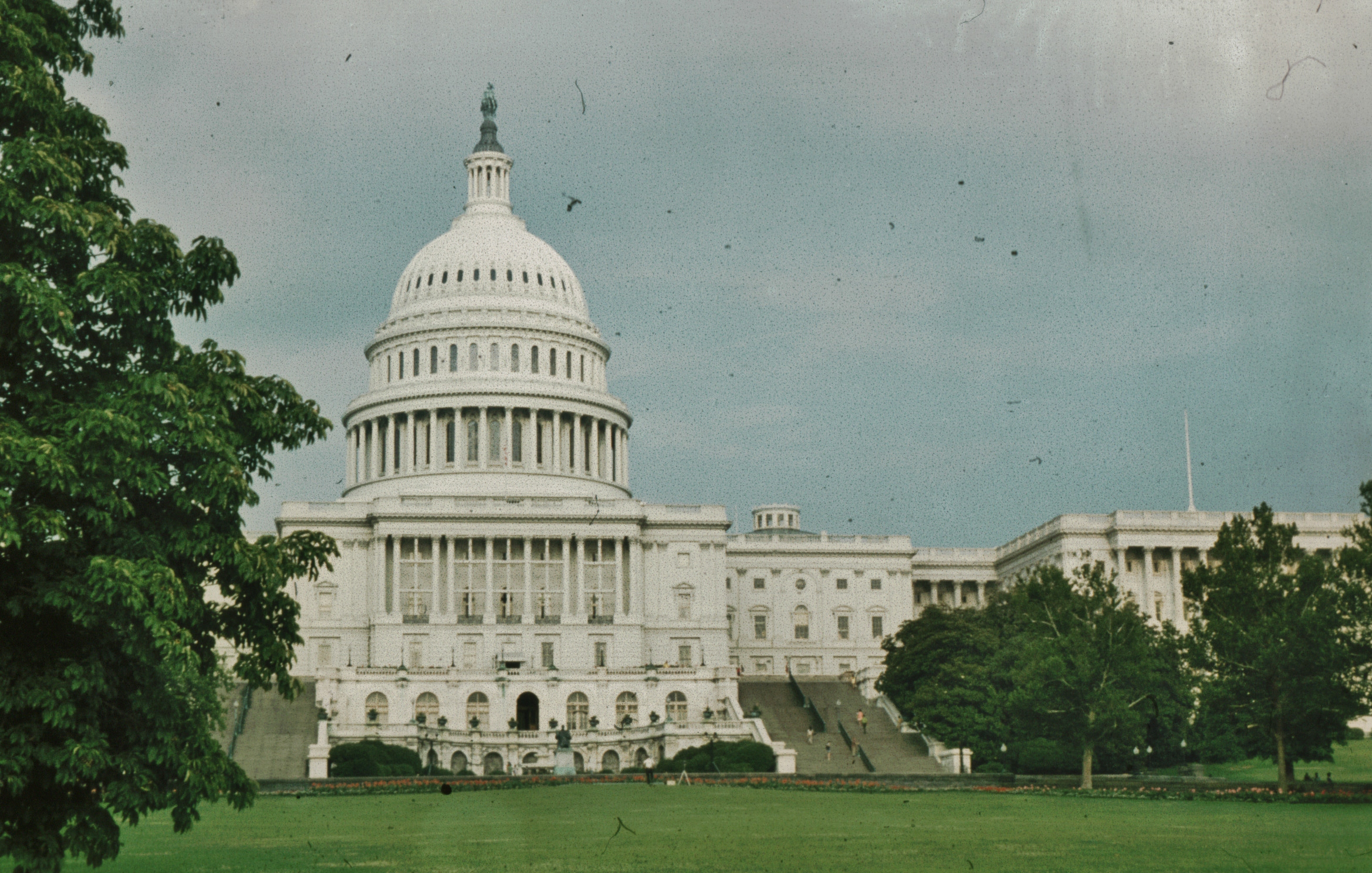
- United States Capitol (c. 1970)

Overview
- Legislative body: United States Congress
- Jurisdiction: United States
- Term: January 3, 1971 – January 3, 1973

Senate
- Members: 100
- President: Spiro Agnew (R)
- President pro tempore: Richard Russell Jr. (D) (until January 21, 1971); Allen J. Ellender (D) (Jan 21, 1971 – Jul 27, 1972); James Eastland (D) (from July 28, 1972)
- Party control: Democratic

House of Representatives
- Members: 435
- Speaker: Carl Albert (D)
- Party control: Democratic

Sessions
- 1st: January 21, 1971 – December 17, 1971
- 2nd: January 18, 1972 – October 18, 1972

The 92nd United States Congress was a meeting of the legislative branch of the United States federal government, composed of the United States Senate and the United States House of Representatives. It met in Washington, D.C., from January 3, 1971, to January 3, 1973, during the third and fourth years of Richard Nixon's presidency.

The apportionment of seats in this House of Representatives was based on the 1960 census. Both chambers maintained a Democratic majority.

== Major events ==
Passing legislation on revenue-sharing was a key event of the congress. President Richard Nixon had it listed on his list of top policies to cover for the year. Nixon signed the bill into law at Independence Hall in Philadelphia. The law gained support from many state and local officials including: San Francisco Mayor Joseph Alioto whose city received $27 million in revenue-sharing money in the first year. Alioto said that many projects that would not have been possible could now be done, "That will effectively enable us to meet those programs which up to now because of very tough budgeting we've had to trench."

== Major legislation ==
- December 18, 1971: Alaska Native Claims Settlement Act, Pub. L. 92–203, 85 Stat. 688
- December 23, 1971: National Cancer Act, Pub. L. 92–218, 85 Stat. 778
- February 7, 1972: Federal Election Campaign Act, Pub. L. 92–225, 86 Stat. 3
- March 24, 1972: Equal Employment Opportunity Act, Pub. L. 92–261, 86 Stat. 103
- June 23, 1972: Title IX Amendment of the Higher Education Act, Pub. L. 92–318, 86 Stat. 235
- October 6, 1972: Federal Advisory Committee Act, Pub. L. 92–463, 86 Stat. 770
- October 18, 1972: Federal Water Pollution Control Amendments of 1972, Pub. L. 92–500, 86 Stat. 816
- October 21, 1972: Marine Mammal Protection Act, Pub. L. 92–522, 86 Stat. 1027
- October 27, 1972: Consumer Product Safety Act, Pub. L. 92–573, 86 Stat. 1207
- October 27, 1972: Noise Control Act, Pub. L. 92–574, 86 Stat. 1234
- October 27, 1972: Coastal Zone Management Act, Pub. L. 92–583, 86 Stat. 1280

== Constitutional amendments ==
- March 23, 1971: Approved an amendment to the United States Constitution prohibiting the states and the federal government from using age as a reason for denying the right to vote to citizens of the United States who are at least eighteen years old, and submitted it to the state legislatures for ratification
  - July 1, 1971: The Twenty-sixth Amendment to the United States Constitution was ratified by the requisite number of states (38) to become part of the Constitution
- March 22, 1972: Approved an amendment to the Constitution designed to guarantee equal rights for women, and submitted it to the state legislatures for ratification
  - This amendment, commonly known as the Equal Rights Amendment, was later rendered inoperative, as it was not ratified within the seven–year time frame set by Congress (nor the later time extension granted)

== Party summary ==
The count below identifies party affiliations at the beginning of the first session of this Congress, and includes members from vacancies and newly admitted states, when they were first seated. Changes resulting from subsequent replacements are shown below in the Changes in membership section.

=== Senate ===
Party standings on the opening day of the 92nd Congress 54 Democratic senators 1 independent senator, caucusing with Democrats 44 Republican senators 1 Conservative senator, caucusing with Republicans

| | Party (shading shows control) | | | Total | Vacant |
| | Democratic (D) | Republican (R) | Other (O) | Total | Vacant |
|---|---|---|---|---|---|
| End of previous congress | 59 | 41 | 0 | 100 | 0 |
| Begin | 54 | 44 | 2 | 100 | 0 |
| End | 54 | 44 | 2 | 100 | 0 |
| Final voting share | 54.0% | 44.0% | 2.0% | | |
| Beginning of next congress | 56 | 42 | 2 (Note: Conservative Party of New York, Independent Democrat) | 100 | 0 |

=== House of Representatives ===
| | Party (shading shows control) | | Total | Vacant |
| | Democratic (D) | Republican (R) | Total | Vacant |
|---|---|---|---|---|
| End of previous congress | 242 | 189 | 431 | 4 |
| Begin | 254 | 180 | 434 | 1 |
| End | 252 | 178 | 430 | 5 |
| Final voting share | 58.6% | 41.4% | | |
| Beginning of next congress | 241 | 192 | 433 | 2 |

== Leadership ==
=== Senate ===
- President: Spiro Agnew (R)
- President pro tempore:
  - Richard Russell Jr. (D), until January 21, 1971
  - Allen J. Ellender (D), January 22, 1971 – July 27, 1972
  - James Eastland (D), from July 28, 1972
- Permanent Acting President pro tempore: Lee Metcalf (D)

==== Majority (Democratic) leadership ====
- Majority Leader: Mike Mansfield
- Majority Whip: Robert Byrd
- Caucus Secretary: Frank Moss

==== Minority (Republican) leadership ====
- Minority Leader: Hugh Scott
- Minority Whip: Robert P. Griffin
- Republican Conference Chairman: Margaret Chase Smith
- Republican Conference Secretary: Norris Cotton
- National Senatorial Committee Chair: Peter H. Dominick
- Policy Committee Chairman: Gordon Allott

=== House of Representatives ===
- Speaker: Carl Albert (D)

==== Majority (Democratic) leadership ====
- Majority Leader: Hale Boggs
- Majority Whip: Tip O'Neill
- Democratic Caucus Chairman: Olin E. Teague
- Democratic Caucus Secretary: Leonor Sullivan
- Democratic Campaign Committee Chairman: Tip O'Neill

==== Minority (Republican) leadership ====
- Minority Leader: Gerald Ford
- Minority Whip: Leslie C. Arends
- Republican Conference Chairman: John B. Anderson
- Republican Conference Vice-Chairman: Robert Stafford then Samuel L. Devine
- Republican Conference Secretary: Richard H. Poff then Jack Edwards
- Policy Committee Chairman: John Jacob Rhodes
- Republican Campaign Committee Chairman: Bob Wilson

== Caucuses ==
- Congressional Black Caucus
- House Democratic Caucus
- Senate Democratic Caucus

== Members ==
This list is arranged by chamber, then by state. Senators are listed in order of class, and representatives are listed by district.

=== Senate ===
Senators are popularly elected statewide every two years, with one-third beginning new six-year terms with each Congress. Preceding the names in the list below are Senate class numbers, which indicate the cycle of their election. In this Congress, Class 1 meant their term began with this Congress, requiring reelection in 1976; Class 2 meant their term ended with this Congress, requiring reelection in 1972; and Class 3 meant their term began in the last Congress, requiring reelection in 1974.

==== Alabama ====
▌2. John J. Sparkman (D)
▌3. James Allen (D)

==== Alaska ====
▌2. Ted Stevens (R)
▌3. Mike Gravel (D)

==== Arizona ====
▌1. Paul Fannin (R)
▌3. Barry Goldwater (R)

==== Arkansas ====
▌2. John L. McClellan (D)
▌3. J. William Fulbright (D)

==== California ====
▌1. John V. Tunney (D)
▌3. Alan Cranston (D)

==== Colorado ====
▌2. Gordon Allott (R)
▌3. Peter H. Dominick (R)

==== Connecticut ====
▌1. Lowell Weicker (R)
▌3. Abraham Ribicoff (D)

==== Delaware ====
▌1. William Roth (R)
▌2. J. Caleb Boggs (R)

==== Florida ====
▌1. Lawton Chiles (D)
▌3. Edward Gurney (R)

==== Georgia ====
▌2. Richard Russell Jr. (D), until January 21, 1971

▌David H. Gambrell (D), February 1, 1971 – November 7, 1972
▌Sam Nunn (D), from November 7, 1972

▌3. Herman Talmadge (D)

==== Hawaii ====
▌1. Hiram Fong (R)
▌3. Daniel Inouye (D)

==== Idaho ====
▌2. Len Jordan (R)
▌3. Frank Church (D)

==== Illinois ====
▌2. Charles H. Percy (R)
▌3. Adlai Stevenson III (D)

==== Indiana ====
▌1. Vance Hartke (D)
▌3. Birch Bayh (D)

==== Iowa ====
▌2. Jack Miller (R)
▌3. Harold Hughes (D)

==== Kansas ====
▌2. James B. Pearson (R)
▌3. Bob Dole (R)

==== Kentucky ====
▌2. John Sherman Cooper (R)
▌3. Marlow Cook (R)

==== Louisiana ====
▌2. Allen J. Ellender (D), until July 27, 1972

▌Elaine Edwards (D), August 1, 1972 – November 13, 1972
▌J. Bennett Johnston (D), from November 14, 1972

▌3. Russell B. Long (D)

==== Maine ====
▌1. Edmund Muskie (D)
▌2. Margaret Chase Smith (R)

==== Maryland ====
▌1. J. Glenn Beall Jr. (R)
▌3. Charles Mathias (R)

==== Massachusetts ====
▌1. Ted Kennedy (D)
▌2. Edward Brooke (R)

==== Michigan ====
▌1. Philip Hart (D)
▌2. Robert P. Griffin (R)

==== Minnesota ====
▌1. Hubert Humphrey (DFL) (Note: The Minnesota Democratic–Farmer–Labor Party (DFL) and the North Dakota Democratic-Nonpartisan League Party (D-NPL) are the Minnesota and North Dakota affiliates of the U.S. Democratic Party and are counted as Democrats.)
▌2. Walter Mondale (DFL)

==== Mississippi ====
▌1. John C. Stennis (D)
▌2. James Eastland (D)

==== Missouri ====
▌1. Stuart Symington (D)
▌3. Thomas Eagleton (D)

==== Montana ====
▌1. Mike Mansfield (D)
▌2. Lee Metcalf (D)

==== Nebraska ====
▌1. Roman Hruska (R)
▌2. Carl Curtis (R)

==== Nevada ====
▌1. Howard Cannon (D)
▌3. Alan Bible (D)

==== New Hampshire ====
▌2. Thomas J. McIntyre (D)
▌3. Norris Cotton (R)

==== New Jersey ====
▌1. Harrison A. Williams (D)
▌2. Clifford P. Case (R)

==== New Mexico ====
▌1. Joseph Montoya (D)
▌2. Clinton P. Anderson (D)

==== New York ====
▌1. James L. Buckley (C)
▌3. Jacob Javits (R)

==== North Carolina ====
▌2. B. Everett Jordan (D)
▌3. Sam Ervin (D)

==== North Dakota ====
▌1. Quentin Burdick (D-NPL)
▌3. Milton Young (R)

==== Ohio ====
▌1. Robert Taft Jr. (R)
▌3. William B. Saxbe (R)

==== Oklahoma ====
▌2. Fred R. Harris (D)
▌3. Henry Bellmon (R)

==== Oregon ====
▌2. Mark Hatfield (R)
▌3. Bob Packwood (R)

==== Pennsylvania ====
▌1. Hugh Scott (R)
▌3. Richard Schweiker (R)

==== Rhode Island ====
▌1. John Pastore (D)
▌2. Claiborne Pell (D)

==== South Carolina ====
▌2. Strom Thurmond (R)
▌3. Fritz Hollings (D)

==== South Dakota ====
▌2. Karl E. Mundt (R)
▌3. George McGovern (D)

==== Tennessee ====
▌1. Bill Brock (R)
▌2. Howard Baker (R)

==== Texas ====
▌1. Lloyd Bentsen (D)
▌2. John Tower (R)

==== Utah ====
▌1. Frank Moss (D)
▌3. Wallace F. Bennett (R)

==== Vermont ====
▌1. Winston L. Prouty (R), until September 10, 1971

▌Robert Stafford (R), from September 16, 1971

▌3. George Aiken (R)

==== Virginia ====
▌1. Harry F. Byrd Jr. (ID)
▌2. William B. Spong Jr. (D)

==== Washington ====
▌1. Henry M. Jackson (D)
▌3. Warren G. Magnuson (D)

==== West Virginia ====
▌1. Robert Byrd (D)
▌2. Jennings Randolph (D)

==== Wisconsin ====
▌1. William Proxmire (D)
▌3. Gaylord Nelson (D)

==== Wyoming ====
▌1. Gale W. McGee (D)
▌2. Clifford Hansen (R)

Makeup of the U.S. Senate at the start of this Congress, color-coded by party. Note: The orange stripes in New York and the green stripes in Virginia denote Conservative James Buckley and Independent Harry F. Byrd Jr., respectively.

Senate majority leadership

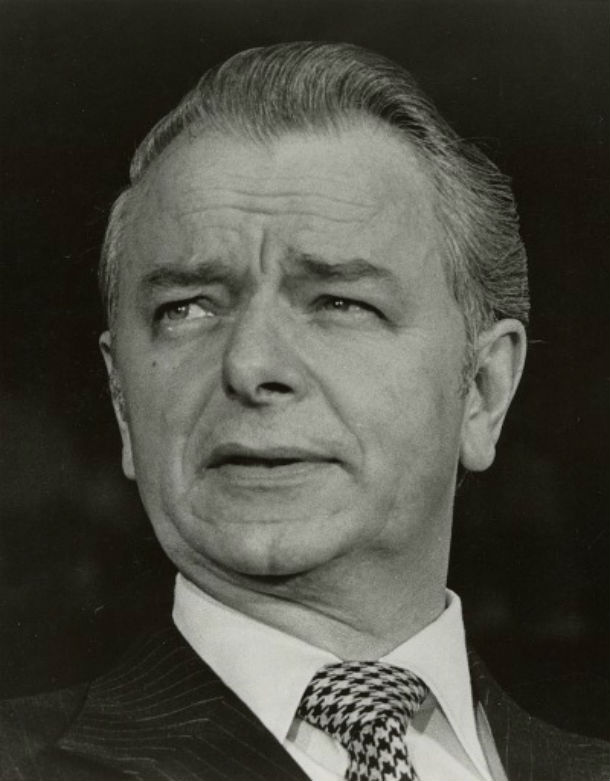
Democratic whip
Robert Byrd

Senate minority leadership

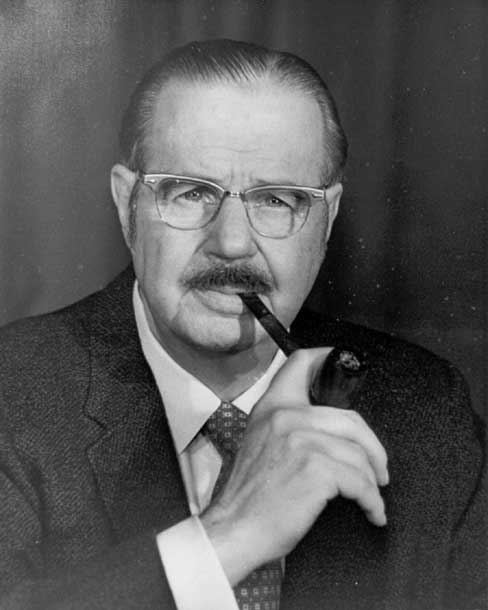
Republican leader
Hugh Scott

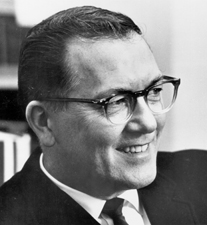
Republican whip
Robert P. Griffin

=== House of Representatives ===
The 92nd Congress was the first whose members were all required to be elected from single-member districts, by congressional statute. The names of representatives are preceded by their district numbers.

==== Alabama ====
(5–3 Democratic)

▌1. Jack Edwards (R)
▌2. William Louis Dickinson (R)
▌3. George W. Andrews (D), until December 25, 1971

▌Elizabeth B. Andrews (D), from April 4, 1972

▌4. Bill Nichols (D)
▌5. Walter Flowers (D)
▌6. John Hall Buchanan Jr. (R)
▌7. Tom Bevill (D)
▌8. Robert E. Jones Jr. (D)

==== Alaska ====
(1 Democrat)

▌At-large. Nick Begich (D), until December 29, 1972

==== Arizona ====
(2–1 Republican)

▌1. John Jacob Rhodes (R)
▌2. Mo Udall (D)
▌3. Sam Steiger (R)

==== Arkansas ====
(3–1 Democratic)

▌1. William Vollie Alexander Jr. (D)
▌2. Wilbur Mills (D)
▌3. John Paul Hammerschmidt (R)
▌4. David Pryor (D)

==== California ====
(20–18 Democratic)

▌1. Donald H. Clausen (R)
▌2. Harold T. Johnson (D)
▌3. John E. Moss (D)
▌4. Robert L. Leggett (D)
▌5. Phillip Burton (D)
▌6. William S. Mailliard (R)
▌7. Ron Dellums (D)
▌8. George P. Miller (D)
▌9. Don Edwards (D)
▌10. Charles Gubser (R)
▌11. Pete McCloskey (R)
▌12. Burt Talcott (R)
▌13. Charles M. Teague (R)
▌14. Jerome Waldie (D)
▌15. John J. McFall (D)
▌16. B. F. Sisk (D)
▌17. Glenn M. Anderson (D)
▌18. Bob Mathias (R)
▌19. Chester E. Holifield (D)
▌20. H. Allen Smith (R)
▌21. Augustus Hawkins (D)
▌22. James C. Corman (D)
▌23. Del M. Clawson (R)
▌24. John H. Rousselot (R)
▌25. Charles E. Wiggins (R)
▌26. Thomas M. Rees (D)
▌27. Barry Goldwater Jr. (R)
▌28. Alphonzo E. Bell Jr. (R)
▌29. George E. Danielson (D)
▌30. Edward R. Roybal (D)
▌31. Charles H. Wilson (D)
▌32. Craig Hosmer (R)
▌33. Jerry Pettis (R)
▌34. Richard T. Hanna (D)
▌35. John G. Schmitz (R)
▌36. Bob Wilson (R)
▌37. Lionel Van Deerlin (D)
▌38. Victor Veysey (R)

==== Colorado ====
(2–2 split)

▌1. Mike McKevitt (R)
▌2. Donald G. Brotzman (R)
▌3. Frank Evans (D)
▌4. Wayne N. Aspinall (D)

==== Connecticut ====
(4–2 Democratic)

▌1. William R. Cotter (D)
▌2. Robert H. Steele (R)
▌3. Robert Giaimo (D)
▌4. Stewart McKinney (R)
▌5. John S. Monagan (D)
▌6. Ella Grasso (D)

==== Delaware ====
(1 Republican)

▌At-large. Pete du Pont (R)

==== Florida ====
(9–3 Democratic)

▌1. Robert L. F. Sikes (D)
▌2. Don Fuqua (D)
▌3. Charles E. Bennett (D)
▌4. Bill Chappell (D)
▌5. Louis Frey Jr. (R)
▌6. Sam Gibbons (D)
▌7. James A. Haley (D)
▌8. Bill Young (R)
▌9. Paul Rogers (D)
▌10. J. Herbert Burke (R)
▌11. Claude Pepper (D)
▌12. Dante Fascell (D)

==== Georgia ====
(8–2 Democratic)

▌1. George Elliott Hagan (D)
▌2. Dawson Mathis (D)
▌3. Jack Brinkley (D)
▌4. Benjamin B. Blackburn (R)
▌5. Fletcher Thompson (R)
▌6. John Flynt (D)
▌7. John William Davis (D)
▌8. W. S. Stuckey Jr. (D)
▌9. Phillip M. Landrum (D)
▌10. Robert Grier Stephens Jr. (D)

==== Hawaii ====
(2 Democrats)

▌1. Spark Matsunaga (D)
▌2. Patsy Mink (D)

==== Idaho ====
(2 Republicans)

▌1. James A. McClure (R)
▌2. Orval H. Hansen (R)

==== Illinois ====
(12–12 split)

▌1. Ralph Metcalfe (D)
▌2. Abner J. Mikva (D)
▌3. Morgan F. Murphy (D)
▌4. Ed Derwinski (R)
▌5. John C. Kluczynski (D)
▌6. George W. Collins (D), until December 8, 1972
▌7. Frank Annunzio (D)
▌8. Dan Rostenkowski (D)
▌9. Sidney R. Yates (D)
▌10. Harold R. Collier (R)
▌11. Roman Pucinski (D)
▌12. Robert McClory (R)
▌13. Phil Crane (R)
▌14. John N. Erlenborn (R)
▌15. Charlotte Thompson Reid (R), until October 7, 1971

▌Cliffard D. Carlson (R), from April 4, 1972

▌16. John B. Anderson (R)
▌17. Leslie C. Arends (R)
▌18. Robert H. Michel (R)
▌19. Tom Railsback (R)
▌20. Paul Findley (R)
▌21. Kenneth J. Gray (D)
▌22. William L. Springer (R)
▌23. George E. Shipley (D)
▌24. Melvin Price (D)

==== Indiana ====
(6–5 Republican)

▌1. Ray Madden (D)
▌2. Earl Landgrebe (R)
▌3. John Brademas (D)
▌4. J. Edward Roush (D)
▌5. Elwood Hillis (R)
▌6. William G. Bray (R)
▌7. John T. Myers (R)
▌8. Roger H. Zion (R)
▌9. Lee H. Hamilton (D)
▌10. David W. Dennis (R)
▌11. Andrew Jacobs Jr. (D)

==== Iowa ====
(5–2 Republican)

▌1. Fred Schwengel (R)
▌2. John Culver (D)
▌3. H. R. Gross (R)
▌4. John Henry Kyl (R)
▌5. Neal Edward Smith (D)
▌6. Wiley Mayne (R)
▌7. William J. Scherle (R)

==== Kansas ====
(4–1 Republican)

▌1. Keith Sebelius (R)
▌2. William R. Roy (D)
▌3. Larry Winn (R)
▌4. Garner E. Shriver (R)
▌5. Joe Skubitz (R)

==== Kentucky ====
(5–2 Democratic)

▌1. Frank Stubblefield (D)
▌2. William Natcher (D)
▌3. Romano Mazzoli (D)
▌4. Gene Snyder (R)
▌5. Tim Lee Carter (R)
▌6. John C. Watts (D), until September 24, 1971

▌William P. Curlin Jr. (D), from December 4, 1971

▌7. Carl D. Perkins (D)

==== Louisiana ====
(8 Democrats)

▌1. F. Edward Hébert (D)
▌2. Hale Boggs (D), until December 29, 1972
▌3. Patrick T. Caffery (D)
▌4. Joe Waggonner (D)
▌5. Otto Passman (D)
▌6. John Rarick (D)
▌7. Edwin Edwards (D), until May 9, 1972

▌John Breaux (D), from September 30, 1972

▌8. Speedy Long (D)

==== Maine ====
(2 Democrats)

▌1. Peter Kyros (D)
▌2. William Hathaway (D)

==== Maryland ====
(5–3 Democratic)

▌1. Rogers Morton (R), until January 29, 1971

▌William Oswald Mills (R), from May 25, 1971

▌2. Clarence Long (D)
▌3. Edward Garmatz (D)
▌4. Paul Sarbanes (D)
▌5. Lawrence Hogan (R)
▌6. Goodloe Byron (D)
▌7. Parren Mitchell (D)
▌8. Gilbert Gude (R)

==== Massachusetts ====
(8–4 Democratic)

▌1. Silvio O. Conte (R)
▌2. Edward Boland (D)
▌3. Robert Drinan (D)
▌4. Harold Donohue (D)
▌5. F. Bradford Morse (R), until May 1, 1972
▌6. Michael J. Harrington (D)
▌7. Torbert Macdonald (D)
▌8. Tip O'Neill (D)
▌9. Louise Day Hicks (D)
▌10. Margaret Heckler (R)
▌11. James A. Burke (D)
▌12. Hastings Keith (R)

==== Michigan ====
(12–7 Republican)

▌1. John Conyers (D)
▌2. Marvin L. Esch (R)
▌3. Garry E. Brown (R)
▌4. J. Edward Hutchinson (R)
▌5. Gerald Ford (R)
▌6. Charles E. Chamberlain (R)
▌7. Donald Riegle (R)
▌8. R. James Harvey (R)
▌9. Guy Vander Jagt (R)
▌10. Elford Albin Cederberg (R)
▌11. Philip Ruppe (R)
▌12. James G. O'Hara (D)
▌13. Charles Diggs (D)
▌14. Lucien Nedzi (D)
▌15. William D. Ford (D)
▌16. John D. Dingell Jr. (D)
▌17. Martha Griffiths (D)
▌18. William Broomfield (R)
▌19. Jack H. McDonald (R)

==== Minnesota ====
(4–4 split)

▌1. Al Quie (R)
▌2. Ancher Nelsen (R)
▌3. Bill Frenzel (R)
▌4. Joseph Karth (DFL)
▌5. Donald M. Fraser (DFL)
▌6. John M. Zwach (R)
▌7. Robert Bergland (DFL)
▌8. John Blatnik (DFL)

==== Mississippi ====
(5 Democrats)

▌1. Thomas Abernethy (D)
▌2. Jamie L. Whitten (D)
▌3. Charles H. Griffin (D)
▌4. Sonny Montgomery (D)
▌5. William M. Colmer (D)

==== Missouri ====
(9–1 Democratic)

▌1. Bill Clay (D)
▌2. James W. Symington (D)
▌3. Leonor Sullivan (D)
▌4. William J. Randall (D)
▌5. Richard Walker Bolling (D)
▌6. William Raleigh Hull Jr. (D)
▌7. Durward Gorham Hall (R)
▌8. Richard Howard Ichord Jr. (D)
▌9. William L. Hungate (D)
▌10. Bill Burlison (D)

==== Montana ====
(1–1 split)

▌1. Richard G. Shoup (R)
▌2. John Melcher (D)

==== Nebraska ====
(3 Republicans)

▌1. Charles Thone (R)
▌2. John Y. McCollister (R)
▌3. David Martin (R)

==== Nevada ====
(1 Democrat)

▌At-large. Walter S. Baring Jr. (D)

==== New Hampshire ====
(2 Republicans)

▌1. Louis C. Wyman (R)
▌2. James Colgate Cleveland (R)

==== New Jersey ====
(9–6 Democratic)

▌1. John E. Hunt (R)
▌2. Charles W. Sandman Jr. (R)
▌3. James J. Howard (D)
▌4. Frank Thompson (D)
▌5. Peter Frelinghuysen Jr. (R)
▌6. Edwin B. Forsythe (R)
▌7. William B. Widnall (R)
▌8. Robert A. Roe (D)
▌9. Henry Helstoski (D)
▌10. Peter W. Rodino (D)
▌11. Joseph Minish (D)
▌12. Florence P. Dwyer (R)
▌13. Cornelius Gallagher (D)
▌14. Dominick V. Daniels (D)
▌15. Edward J. Patten (D)

==== New Mexico ====
(1–1 split)

▌1. Manuel Lujan Jr. (R)
▌2. Harold L. Runnels (D)

==== New York ====
(24–17 Democratic)

▌1. Otis G. Pike (D)
▌2. James R. Grover Jr. (R)
▌3. Lester L. Wolff (D)
▌4. John W. Wydler (R)
▌5. Norman F. Lent (R)
▌6. Seymour Halpern (R)
▌7. Joseph P. Addabbo (D)
▌8. Benjamin Stanley Rosenthal (D)
▌9. James J. Delaney (D)
▌10. Emanuel Celler (D)
▌11. Frank J. Brasco (D)
▌12. Shirley Chisholm (D)
▌13. Bertram L. Podell (D)
▌14. John J. Rooney (D)
▌15. Hugh Carey (D)
▌16. John M. Murphy (D)
▌17. Ed Koch (D)
▌18. Charles Rangel (D)
▌19. Bella Abzug (D)
▌20. William Fitts Ryan (D), until September 17, 1972
▌21. James H. Scheuer (D)
▌22. Herman Badillo (D)
▌23. Jonathan Brewster Bingham (D)
▌24. Mario Biaggi (D)
▌25. Peter A. Peyser (R)
▌▌26. Ogden Reid (R) to (D), March 22, 1972
▌27. John G. Dow (D)
▌28. Hamilton Fish IV (R)
▌29. Samuel S. Stratton (D)
▌30. Carleton J. King (R)
▌31. Robert C. McEwen (R)
▌32. Alexander Pirnie (R)
▌33. Howard W. Robison (R)
▌34. John H. Terry (R)
▌35. James M. Hanley (D)
▌36. Frank Horton (R)
▌37. Barber Conable (R)
▌38. James F. Hastings (R)
▌39. Jack Kemp (R)
▌40. Henry P. Smith III (R)
▌41. Thaddeus J. Dulski (D)

==== North Carolina ====
(7–4 Democratic)

▌1. Walter B. Jones Sr. (D)
▌2. Lawrence H. Fountain (D)
▌3. David N. Henderson (D)
▌4. Nick Galifianakis (D)
▌5. Wilmer Mizell (R)
▌6. L. Richardson Preyer (D)
▌7. Alton Lennon (D)
▌8. Earl B. Ruth (R)
▌9. Charles R. Jonas (R)
▌10. Jim Broyhill (R)
▌11. Roy A. Taylor (D)

==== North Dakota ====
(1–1 split)

▌1. Mark Andrews (R)
▌2. Arthur A. Link (D-NPL)

==== Ohio ====
(17–7 Republican)

▌1. William J. Keating (R)
▌2. Donald D. Clancy (R)
▌3. Charles W. Whalen Jr. (R)
▌4. William Moore McCulloch (R)
▌5. Del Latta (R)
▌6. Bill Harsha (R)
▌7. Bud Brown (R)
▌8. Jackson Edward Betts (R)
▌9. Thomas L. Ashley (D)
▌10. Clarence E. Miller (R)
▌11. J. William Stanton (R)
▌12. Samuel L. Devine (R)
▌13. Charles Adams Mosher (R)
▌14. John F. Seiberling (D)
▌15. Chalmers Wylie (R)
▌16. Frank T. Bow (R), until November 13, 1972
▌17. John M. Ashbrook (R)
▌18. Wayne Hays (D)
▌19. Charles J. Carney (D)
▌20. James V. Stanton (D)
▌21. Louis Stokes (D)
▌22. Charles Vanik (D)
▌23. William Edwin Minshall Jr. (R)
▌24. Walter E. Powell (R)

==== Oklahoma ====
(4–2 Democratic)

▌1. Page Belcher (R)
▌2. Ed Edmondson (D)
▌3. Carl Albert (D)
▌4. Tom Steed (D)
▌5. John Jarman (D)
▌6. John Newbold Camp (R)

==== Oregon ====
(2–2 split)

▌1. Wendell Wyatt (R)
▌2. Al Ullman (D)
▌3. Edith Green (D)
▌4. John R. Dellenback (R)

==== Pennsylvania ====
(14–13 Democratic)

▌1. William A. Barrett (D)
▌2. Robert N. C. Nix Sr. (D)
▌3. James A. Byrne (D)
▌4. Joshua Eilberg (D)
▌5. William J. Green III (D)
▌6. Gus Yatron (D)
▌7. Lawrence G. Williams (R)
▌8. Edward G. Biester Jr. (R)
▌9. John H. Ware III (R)
▌10. Joseph M. McDade (R)
▌11. Dan Flood (D)
▌12. J. Irving Whalley (R)
▌13. Lawrence Coughlin (R)
▌14. William S. Moorhead (D)
▌15. Fred B. Rooney (D)
▌16. Edwin Duing Eshleman (R)
▌17. Herman T. Schneebeli (R)
▌18. Robert J. Corbett (R), until April 25, 1971

▌John Heinz (R), from November 2, 1971

▌19. George Atlee Goodling (R)
▌20. Joseph M. Gaydos (D)
▌21. John Herman Dent (D)
▌22. John P. Saylor (R)
▌23. Albert W. Johnson (R)
▌24. Joseph P. Vigorito (D)
▌25. Frank M. Clark (D)
▌26. Thomas E. Morgan (D)
▌27. James G. Fulton (R), until October 6, 1971

▌William Sheldrick Conover (R), from April 25, 1972

==== Rhode Island ====
(2 Democrats)

▌1. Fernand St Germain (D)
▌2. Robert Tiernan (D)

==== South Carolina ====
(5–1 Democratic)

▌1. Mendel Jackson Davis (D), from April 27, 1971
▌2. Floyd Spence (R)
▌3. William Jennings Bryan Dorn (D)
▌4. James Mann (D)
▌5. Thomas S. Gettys (D)
▌6. John L. McMillan (D)

==== South Dakota ====
(2 Democrats)

▌1. Frank E. Denholm (D)
▌2. James Abourezk (D)

==== Tennessee ====
(5–4 Democratic)

▌1. Jimmy Quillen (R)
▌2. John Duncan Sr. (R)
▌3. LaMar Baker (R)
▌4. Joe L. Evins (D)
▌5. Richard Fulton (D)
▌6. William Anderson (D)
▌7. Ray Blanton (D)
▌8. Ed Jones (D)
▌9. Dan Kuykendall (R)

==== Texas ====
(20–3 Democratic)

▌1. Wright Patman (D)
▌2. John Dowdy (D)
▌3. James M. Collins (R)
▌4. Ray Roberts (D)
▌5. Earle Cabell (D)
▌6. Olin E. Teague (D)
▌7. Bill Archer (R)
▌8. Robert C. Eckhardt (D)
▌9. Jack Brooks (D)
▌10. J. J. Pickle (D)
▌11. William R. Poage (D)
▌12. Jim Wright (D)
▌13. Graham B. Purcell Jr. (D)
▌14. John Andrew Young (D)
▌15. Kika de la Garza (D)
▌16. Richard Crawford White (D)
▌17. Omar Burleson (D)
▌18. Bob Price (R)
▌19. George H. Mahon (D)
▌20. Henry B. González (D)
▌21. O. C. Fisher (D)
▌22. Robert R. Casey (D)
▌23. Abraham Kazen (D)

==== Utah ====
(1–1 split)

▌1. K. Gunn McKay (D)
▌2. Sherman P. Lloyd (R)

==== Vermont ====
(1 Republican)

▌At-large. Robert Stafford (R), until September 16, 1971

▌Richard W. Mallary (R), from January 7, 1972

==== Virginia ====
(6–4 Republican)

▌1. Thomas N. Downing (D)
▌2. G. William Whitehurst (R)
▌3. David E. Satterfield III (D)
▌4. Watkins Moorman Abbitt (D)
▌5. Dan Daniel (D)
▌6. Richard Harding Poff (R), until August 29, 1972

▌M. Caldwell Butler (R), from November 7, 1972

▌7. J. Kenneth Robinson (R)
▌8. William L. Scott (R)
▌9. William C. Wampler (R)
▌10. Joel Broyhill (R)

==== Washington ====
(6–1 Democratic)

▌1. Thomas Pelly (R)
▌2. Lloyd Meeds (D)
▌3. Julia Butler Hansen (D)
▌4. Mike McCormack (D)
▌5. Tom Foley (D)
▌6. Floyd Hicks (D)
▌7. Brock Adams (D)

==== West Virginia ====
(5 Democrats)

▌1. Bob Mollohan (D)
▌2. Harley Orrin Staggers (D)
▌3. John M. Slack Jr. (D)
▌4. Ken Hechler (D)
▌5. James Kee (D)

==== Wisconsin ====
(5–5 split)

▌1. Les Aspin (D)
▌2. Robert Kastenmeier (D)
▌3. Vernon Wallace Thomson (R)
▌4. Clement J. Zablocki (D)
▌5. Henry S. Reuss (D)
▌6. William A. Steiger (R)
▌7. Dave Obey (D)
▌8. John W. Byrnes (R)
▌9. Glenn Robert Davis (R)
▌10. Alvin O'Konski (R)

==== Wyoming ====
(1 Democrat)

▌At-large. Teno Roncalio (D)

==== Non-voting members ====
(2 Democrats)

▌District of Columbia. Walter Fauntroy (D), from March 23, 1971
▌Puerto Rico. Jorge Luis Córdova (Resident Commissioner) (PNP)

House majority leadership

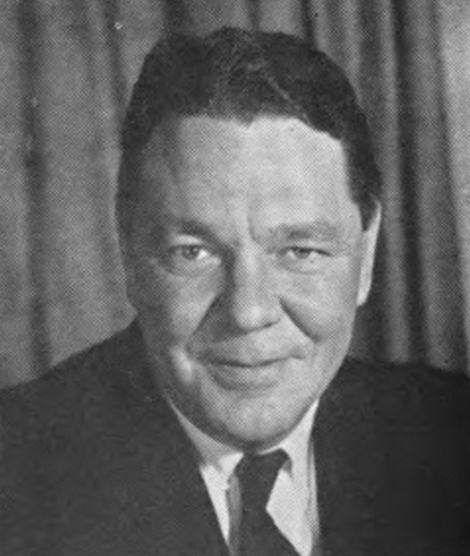
Democratic leader
Hale Boggs

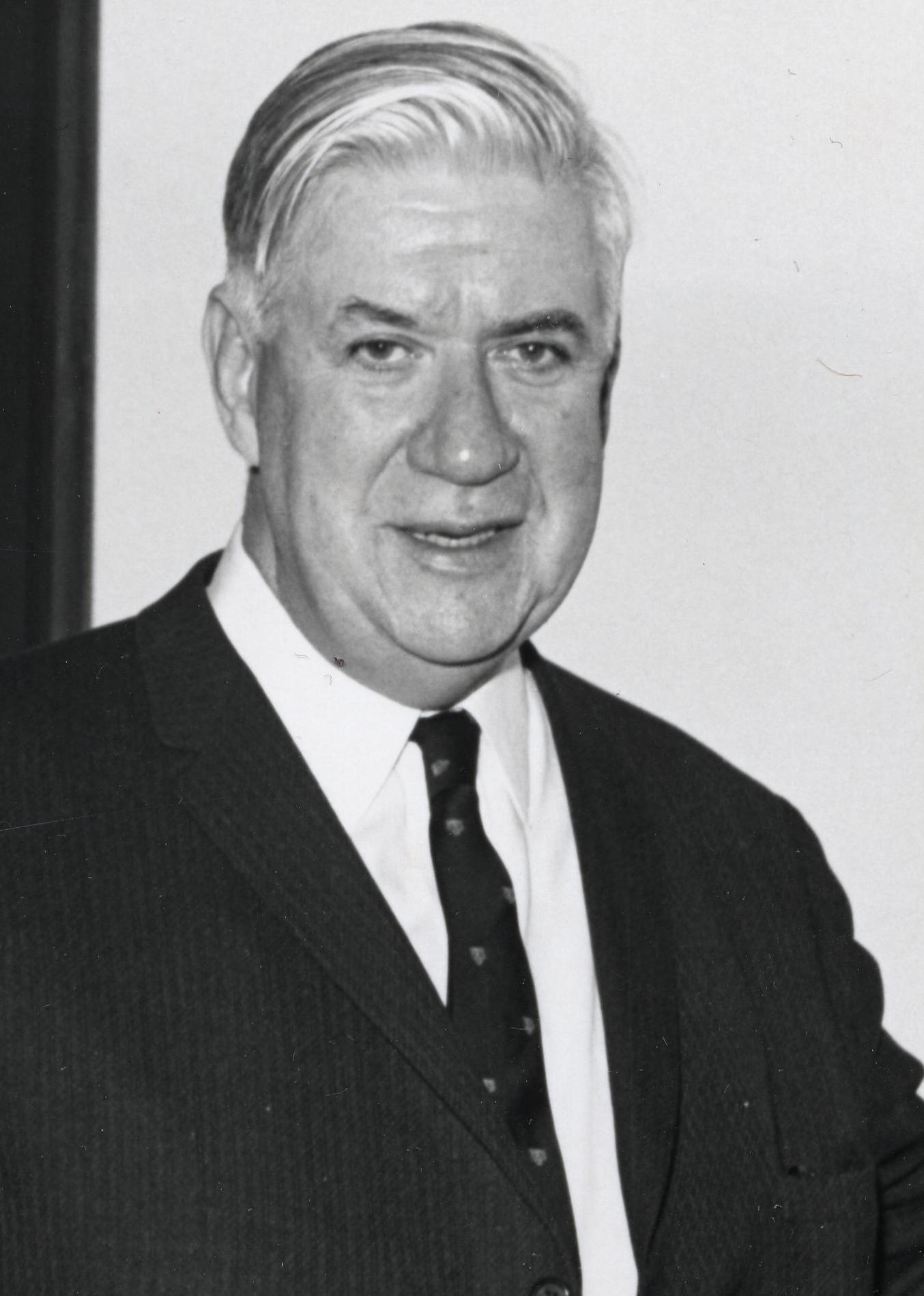
Democratic whip
Tip O'Neill

House minority leadership

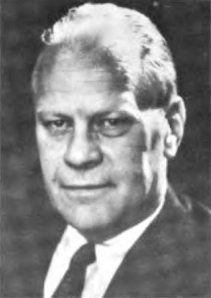
Republican leader
Gerald Ford

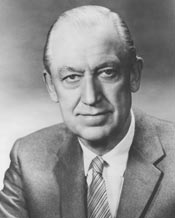
Republican whip
Leslie C. Arends

== Changes in membership ==
The count below reflects changes from the beginning of the first session of this Congress.

=== Senate ===
- Replacements: 5
  - Democratic: no net change
  - Republican: no net change
- Deaths: 3
- Resignations: 0
- Total seats with changes: 3

Senate changes
| State (class) | Vacated by | Reason for change | Successor | Date of successor's formal installation (Note: When seated or oath administered, not necessarily when service began.) |
|---|---|---|---|---|
| Georgia (2) | Richard Russell Jr. (D) | Died January 21, 1971 | David H. Gambrell (D) | February 1, 1971 |
| Vermont (1) | Winston L. Prouty (R) | Died September 10, 1971 | Robert Stafford (R) | September 16, 1971 |
| Louisiana (2) | Allen J. Ellender (D) | Died July 27, 1972 | Elaine S. Edwards (D) | August 1, 1972 |
| Georgia (2) | David H. Gambrell (D) | Successor elected November 7, 1972 | Sam Nunn (D) | November 8, 1972 |
| Louisiana (2) | Elaine S. Edwards (D) | Successor elected November 13, 1972 | J. Bennett Johnston (D) | November 14, 1972 |

=== House of Representatives ===
- Replacements: 10
  - Democratic: no net loss
  - Republican: no net gain
- Deaths: 8
- Resignations: 6
- Total seats with changes: 16

House changes
| District | Vacated by | Reason for change | Successor | Date of successor's formal installation |
|---|---|---|---|---|
| District of Columbia at-large | Vacant | District elected first delegate since the seat was re-established during previous congress | Walter Fauntroy (D) | March 23, 1971 |
| South Carolina 1st | Vacant | Rep. L. Mendel Rivers died during previous congress | Mendel Jackson Davis (D) | April 27, 1971 |
| Maryland 1st | Rogers Morton (R) | Resigned January 29, 1971, after being appointed United States Secretary of the Interior | William Oswald Mills (R) | May 25, 1971 |
| Pennsylvania 18th | Robert J. Corbett (R) | Died April 25, 1971 | John Heinz (R) | November 2, 1971 |
| Vermont at-large | Robert Stafford (R) | Resigned after being appointed to the US Senate September 16, 1971 | Richard W. Mallary (R) | January 7, 1972 |
| Kentucky 6th | John C. Watts (D) | Died September 24, 1971 | William P. Curlin Jr. (D) | December 4, 1971 |
| Pennsylvania 27th | James G. Fulton (R) | Died October 6, 1971 | William Sheldrick Conover (R) | April 25, 1972 |
| Illinois 15th | Charlotte Thompson Reid (R) | Resigned October 7, 1971, after being appointed to the Federal Communications Commission | Cliffard D. Carlson (R) | April 4, 1972 |
| Alabama 3rd | George W. Andrews (D) | Died December 25, 1971 | Elizabeth B. Andrews (D) | April 4, 1972 |
| Massachusetts 5th | F. Bradford Morse (R) | Resigned May 1, 1972, after being appointed Undersecretary General for Political and General Assembly Affairs at the United Nations | Vacant | Not filled this congress |
| Louisiana 7th | Edwin Edwards (D) | Resigned after being elected Governor of Louisiana May 9, 1972 | John Breaux (D) | September 30, 1972 |
| Virginia 6th | Richard Harding Poff (R) | Resigned after being appointed as a judge of the Supreme Court of Virginia | M. Caldwell Butler (R) | November 7, 1972 |
| New York 20th | William Fitts Ryan (D) | Died September 17, 1972. | Vacant | Not filled this congress |
| Ohio 16th | Frank T. Bow (R) | Died November 13, 1972. | Vacant | Not filled this congress |
| Illinois 6th | George W. Collins (D) | Died in a plane crash December 8, 1972. | Vacant | Not filled this congress |
| Alaska at-large | Nick Begich (D) | He and Hale Boggs were lost in a plane crash October 16, 1972. Presumptive death certificate for Rep. Begich was issued December 29, 1972. | Vacant | Not filled this congress |

== Committees ==
Lists of committees and their party leaders for members of the House and Senate committees can be found through the Official Congressional Directory at the bottom of this article. The directory after the pages of terms of service lists committees of the Senate, House (Standing with Subcommittees, Select and Special) and Joint and, after that, House/Senate committee assignments. On the committees section of the House and Senate in the Official Congressional Directory, the committee's members on the first row on the left side shows the chairman of the committee and on the right side shows the ranking member of the committee.

=== Senate ===
- Aeronautical and Space Sciences (Chair: Clinton P. Anderson; Ranking Member: Carl T. Curtis)
- Agriculture and Forestry (Chair: Herman E. Talmadge; Ranking Member: Jack Miller)
- Appropriations (Chair: Allen J. Ellender; Ranking Member: Milton R. Young)
- Armed Services (Chair: John C. Stennis; Ranking Member: Margaret Chase Smith)
- Banking, Housing and Currency (Chair: John J. Sparkman; Ranking Member: John G. Tower)
- Commerce (Chair: Warren G. Magnuson; Ranking Member: Norris Cotton)
- District of Columbia (Chair: Thomas F. Eagleton; Ranking Member: Charles Mathias)
- Equal Educational Opportunity (Select) (Chair: Walter Mondale)
- Finance (Chair: Russell B. Long; Ranking Member: Wallace F. Bennett)
- Foreign Relations (Chair: J. William Fulbright; Ranking Member: George D. Aiken)
- Government Operations (Chair: John Little McClellan; Ranking Member: Karl E. Mundt)
- Interior and Insular Affairs (Chair: Henry M. Jackson; Ranking Member: Gordon Allott)
- Judiciary (Chair: James O. Eastland; Ranking Member: Roman L. Hruska)
- Labor and Public Welfare (Chair: Harrison A. Williams; Ranking Member: Jacob K. Javits)
- Nutrition and Human Needs (Select) (Chair: George McGovern)
- Post Office and Civil Services (Chair: Gale W. McGee; Ranking Member: Hiram L. Fong)
- Public Works (Chair: Jennings Randolph; Ranking Member: John Sherman Cooper)
- Rules and Administration (Chair: B. Everett Jordan; Ranking Member: Winston L. Prouty)
- Secret and Confidential Government Documents (Special) (Chair: [data missing]; Ranking Member: [data missing])
- Small Business (Select) (Chair: Alan Bible)
- Standards and Conduct (Select) (Chair: John C. Stennis; Vice Chair: Wallace F. Bennett)
- Subcommittee on Veterans' Affairs (Chair: Vance Hartke; Ranking Member: Strom Thurmond)
- Whole

=== House of Representatives ===
- Agriculture (Chair: William R. Poage; Ranking Member: Page Belcher)
- Appropriations (Chair: George H. Mahon; Ranking Member: Frank T. Bow)
- Armed Services (Chair: F. Edward Hebert; Ranking Member: Leslie C. Arends)
- Banking and Currency (Chair: Wright Patman; Ranking Member: William B. Widnall)
- Crime (Select) (Chair: Claude Pepper)
- District of Columbia (Chair: John L. McMillan; Ranking Member: Ancher Nelsen)
- Education and Labor (Chair: Carl D. Perkins; Ranking Member: Al Quie)
- Foreign Affairs (Chair: Thomas E. Morgan; Ranking Member: William S. Mailliard)
- Government Operations (Chair: Chet Holifield; Ranking Member: Florence P. Dwyer)
- House Administration (Chair: Wayne L. Hays; Ranking Member: Samuel L. Devine)
- House Beauty Shop (Select) (Chair: Martha W. Griffiths)
- House Restaurant (Select) (Chair: John C. Kluczynski)
- Interior and Insular Affairs (Chair: Wayne N. Aspinall; Ranking Member: John P. Saylor)
- Internal Security (Chair: Richard H. Ichord; Ranking Member: John M. Ashbrook)
- Interstate and Foreign Commerce (Chair: Harley O. Staggers; Ranking Member: William L. Springer)
- Judiciary (Chair: Emanuel Celler; Ranking Member: William M. McCulloch)
- Merchant Marine and Fisheries (Chair: Emanuel Celler; Ranking Member: Thomas M. Pelly)
- Post Office and Civil Service (Chair: Edward A. Garmatz; Ranking Member: Robert J. Corbett)
- Public Works (Chair: John A. Blatnik; Ranking Member: Bill Harsha)
- Regulate Parking (Select) (Chair: B.F. Sisk)
- Rules (Chair: William M. Colmer; Ranking Member: H. Allen Smith)
- Science and Astronautics (Chair: George P. Miller; Ranking Member: James G. Fulton)
- Small Business (Select) (Chair: Joe L. Evins)
- Standards of Official Conduct (Chair: Charles Melvin Price; Ranking Member: Jackson E. Betts)
- Veterans' Affairs (Chair: Olin E. Teague; Ranking Member: Charles M. Teague)
- Ways and Means (Chair: Wilbur D. Mills; Ranking Member: John W. Byrnes)
- Whole

=== Joint committees ===
- Atomic Energy (Chair: Sen. John O. Pastore; Vice Chair: Rep. Charles Melvin Price)
- Congressional Operations (Chair: Rep. Jack Brooks; Vice Chair: Sen. Lee Metcalf)
- Defense Production (Chair: Rep. Wright Patman; Vice Chair: Sen. John J. Sparkman)
- Economic (Chair: Sen. William Proxmire; Vice Chair: Rep. Wright Patman)
- The Library (Chair: Rep. Wayne L. Hays; Vice Chair: Sen. B. Everett Jordan)
- Navajo-Hopi Indian Administration
- Printing (Chair: N/A)
- Reduction of Nonessential Federal Expenditures (Chair: Rep. George H. Mahon)
- Taxation (Chair: Rep. Wilbur D. Mills; Vice Chair: Sen. Russell B. Long)

== Employees ==
=== Legislative branch agency directors ===
- Architect of the Capitol: George Malcolm White, appointed January 27, 1971
- Attending Physician of the United States Congress: Rufus Pearson
- Comptroller General of the United States: Elmer B. Staats
- Librarian of Congress: Lawrence Quincy Mumford
- Public Printer of the United States: Adolphus N. Spence, until 1972

=== Senate ===
- Chaplain: Edward L.R. Elson (Presbyterian)
- Curator: James R. Ketchum
- Parliamentarian: Floyd Riddick
- Secretary: Francis R. Valeo
- Librarian: Richard D. Hupman
- Democratic Party Secretary: J. Stanley Kimmitt
- Republican Party Secretary: J. Mark Trice
- Sergeant at Arms: Robert G. Dunphy, until June 30, 1972 (resigned)
  - William H. Wannall, from July 1, 1972

=== House of Representatives ===
- Clerk: W. Pat Jennings
- Sergeant at Arms: Zeake W. Johnson Jr., January 21, 1971 – September 30, 1972 (resigned)
  - Kenneth R. Harding, from October 1, 1972
- Doorkeeper: William M. Miller
- Postmaster: H. H. Morris, January 21, 1971 – June 30, 1972 (resigned)
  - Robert V. Rota, from July 1, 1972
- Parliamentarian: Lewis Deschler
- Reading Clerks: Joe Bartlett (R) and Charles W. Hackney Jr. (D)
- Chaplain: Edward G. Latch (Methodist)

== Footnotes ==
- Martis, Kenneth C. (1989). The Historical Atlas of Political Parties in the United States Congress. New York: Macmillan Publishing Company.
- Martis, Kenneth C. (1982). The Historical Atlas of United States Congressional Districts. New York: Macmillan Publishing Company.

== See also ==
- List of new members of the 92nd United States Congress
- 1970 United States elections (elections leading to this Congress)
  - 1970 United States Senate elections
  - 1970 United States House of Representatives elections
- 1972 United States elections (elections during this Congress, leading to the next Congress)
  - 1972 United States presidential election
  - 1972 United States Senate elections
  - 1972 United States House of Representatives elections
