= 1972 United States Senate election in Louisiana =

- November 7, 1972
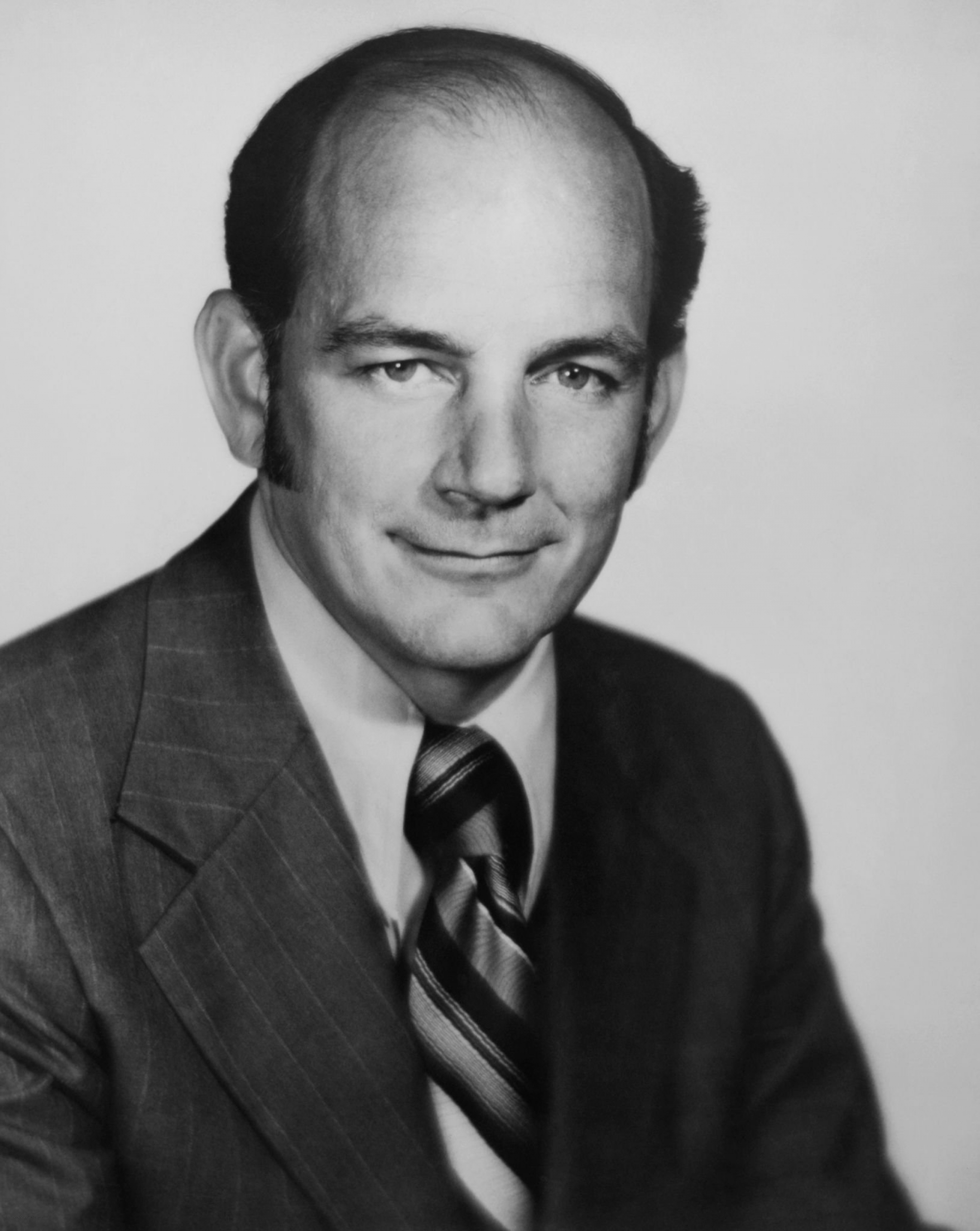

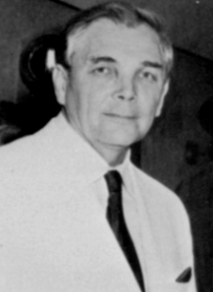

Nominee	J. Bennett Johnston	John McKeithen	Ben Toledano
Party	Democratic	Independent	Republican
Popular vote	598,987	250,161	206,846
Percentage	55.21%	23.06%	19.07%
- Parish results Johnston: 30–40% 40–50% 50–60% 60–70% McKeithen: 40–50% 50–60% 60–70%
U.S. senator before election
Elaine Edwards
Democratic
Elected U.S. Senator
J. Bennett Johnston
Democratic

The 1972 United States Senate election in Louisiana was held on November 9, 1972.

Former state representative J. Bennett Johnston was elected to the Senate to succeed First Lady of Louisiana Elaine Edwards, who had been appointed by her husband on an interim basis following the death of Senator Allen Ellender. Following Johnston's victory in the general election, Elaine Edwards resigned and Governor Edwin Edwards appointed Johnston, so that he could gain seniority in the Senate.

Louisiana was one of fifteen states, alongside Alabama, Arkansas, Colorado, Delaware, Georgia, Iowa, Maine, Minnesota, Mississippi, Montana, New Hampshire, Rhode Island, South Dakota and West Virginia, that were won by Republican President Richard Nixon in 1972 that elected Democrats to the United States Senate.

== Democratic primary ==
=== Candidates ===
==== Declared ====
- Frank Tunney Allen, resident of West Monroe
- J. Bennett Johnston, former state representative and candidate for governor in 1972

==== Deceased ====
- Allen Ellender, incumbent senator

Ellender died on July 27, a few weeks before the August 19 primary, but his name remained on the ballot.

=== Results ===
1972 Democratic U.S. Senate primary
Party	Candidate	Votes	%
Democratic	J. Bennett Johnston	623,078	79.44%
Democratic	Frank T. Allen	88,198	11.25%
Democratic	Allen Ellender (inc., deceased)	73,088	9.32%
Total votes		784,364	100.00%

== Republican primary ==
=== Candidates ===
- Ben Toledano, attorney and nominee for mayor of New Orleans in 1970

==== Withdrew ====
- Charles M. McLean

=== Results ===
Following Ellender's death, the Republican Party replaced presumptive nominee Charles McLean with attorney and New Orleans mayoral candidate Ben Toledano. Toledano was unopposed for the Republican nomination.

== Independents and third parties ==
=== American Independent ===
- Hall Lyons, Republican nominee for Louisiana's 3rd congressional district in 1966

=== Independent ===
- John J. McKeithen, former governor of Louisiana

Following Ellender's death, former governor John McKeithen joined the race as an independent candidate. He initially hoped to enter the race as a Democrat but was barred by party leaders from entering the primary. He campaigned against the Democratic Party's presidential nominee, George McGovern.

== General election ==
=== Campaign ===
The sudden death of Ellender and the independent candidacy of former governor McKeithen made this a rare competitive general election in Louisiana. The Republican Party had not seriously contested one of Louisiana's Senate seats since Reconstruction, and Republican leaders believed McKeithen's presence in the race could split the Democratic vote.

McKeithen ran a populist, agrarian campaign against Johnston, citing his own investment in the state's agriculture industry and attempting to portray Johnston as an urban elitist, similar to McKeithen's campaign against former New Orleans Mayor deLesseps Story Morrison in the 1963-64 governor's race. All three major candidates supported President Nixon's handling of the Vietnam War.

=== Results ===
General election results
Party	Candidate	Votes	%	±%
Democratic	J. Bennett Johnston	598,987	55.21%	▼44.79
Independent	John J. McKeithen	250,161	23.06%	N/A
Republican	Ben Toledano	206,846	19.07%	▲19.07
American Independent	Hall M. Lyons	28,910	2.67%	▲2.67
Total votes		1,084,904	100.00%	

== See also ==
- 1972 United States Senate elections
