= 1988 Senate Democratic Caucus leadership election =

- November 29, 1988

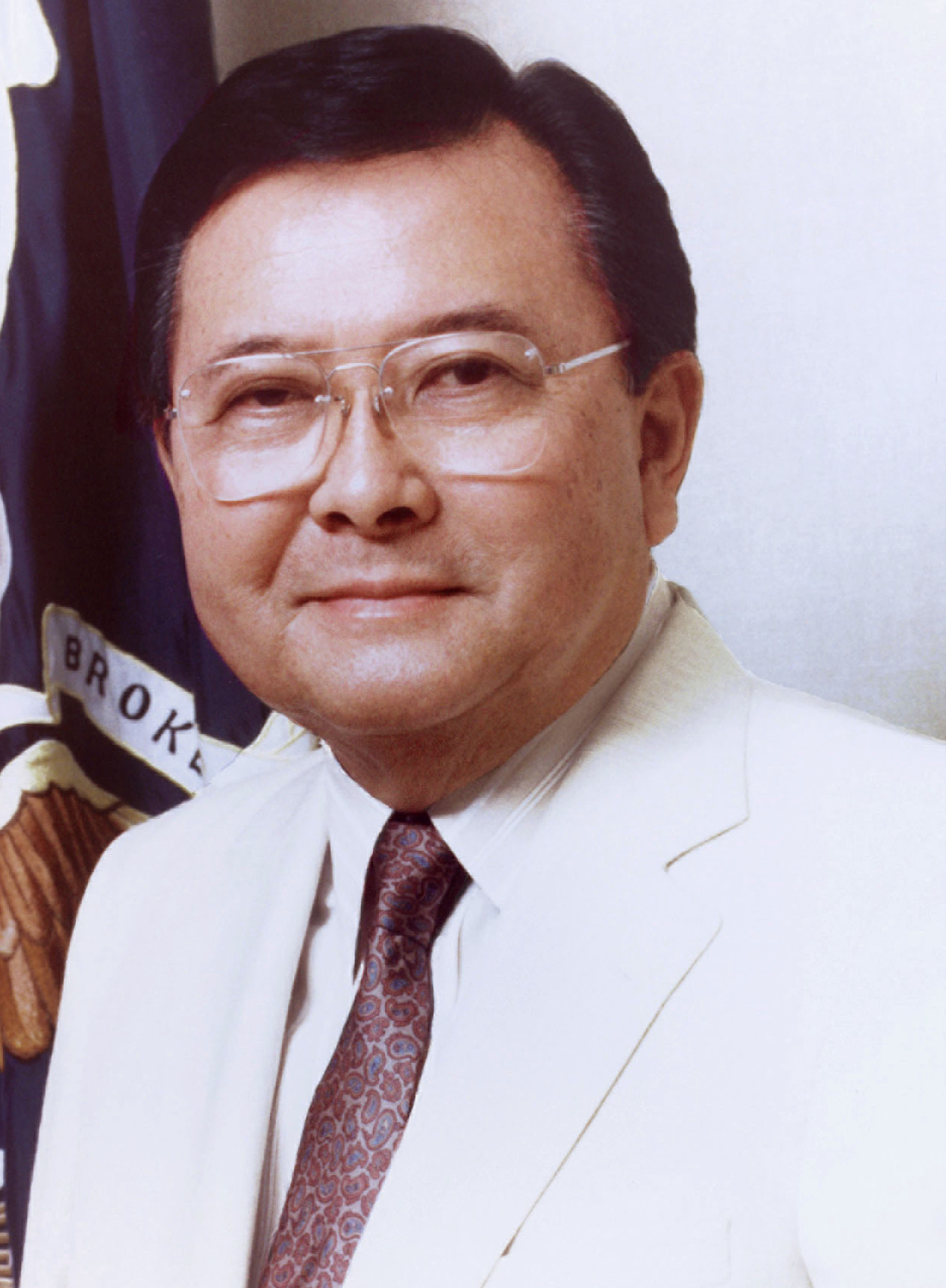

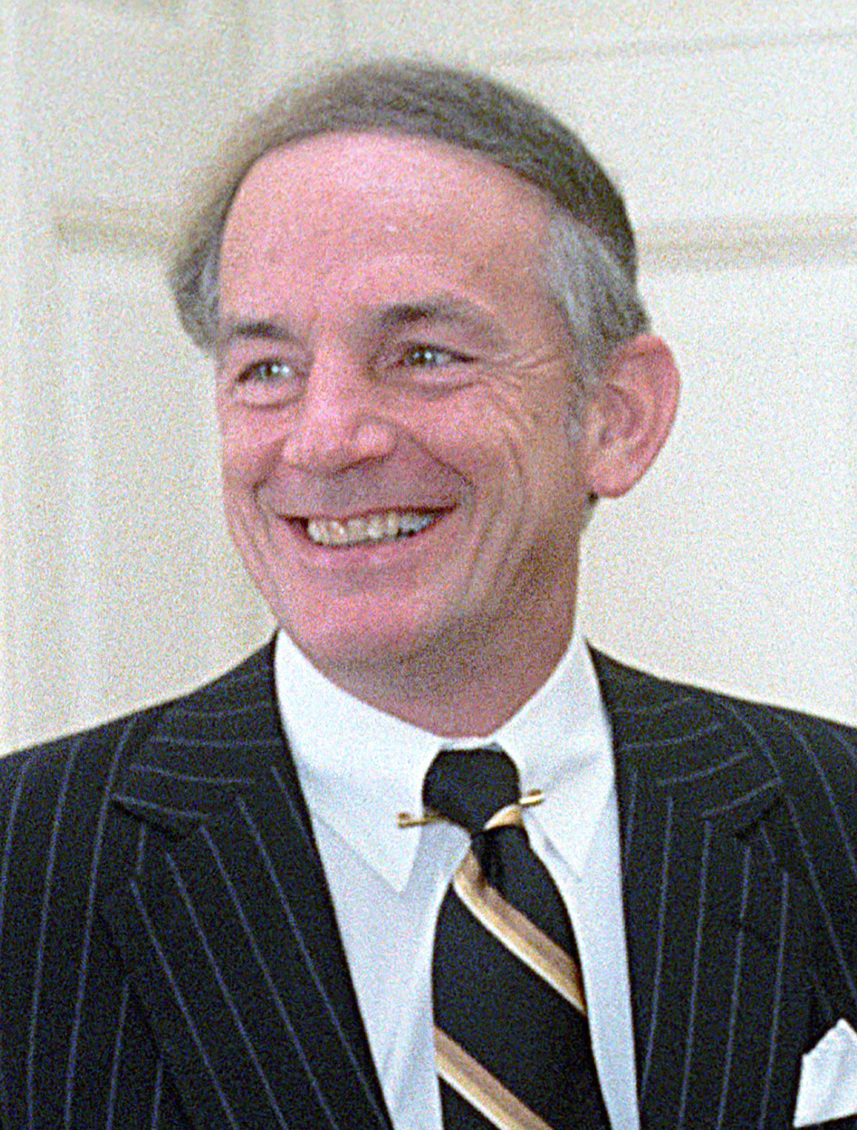
Candidate	George Mitchell	Daniel Inouye	J. Bennett Johnston
Home state	Maine	Hawaii	Louisiana
Members' vote	27	14	14
Percentage	49.09%	25.45%	25.45%
Leader before election
Robert Byrd
Elected Leader
George Mitchell

The 1988 Senate Democratic Caucus leadership election was held on November 29, 1988, to elect the leader of the Senate Democratic Caucus. Incumbent Robert Byrd chose to retire as caucus leader. Senator George Mitchell of Maine won a plurality of the votes in the first round against Secretary of the Senate Democratic Caucus Daniel Inouye of Hawaii and Senator J. Bennett Johnston of Louisiana who tied. Inouye and Johnston withdrew afterwards, allowing Mitchell to be elected by acclamation.

== Candidates ==
The following candidates declared their intent to run.

Candidate	State	Other Senate roles
George Mitchell	Maine (Served since 1980)	Deputy president pro tempore (Since 1987)
Daniel Inouye	Hawaii (Served since 1963)	Secretary of the Senate Democratic Caucus (Since 1977); Chair of the Senate Intelligence Committee (1976–1978)
J. Bennett Johnston	Louisiana (Served since 1972)	None

== Results ==
Candidate	Votes	Percent
George Mitchell	27	49%
Daniel Inouye	14	25%
J. Bennett Johnston	14	25%
Total:	55	100%
