= 1978 United States Senate election in Louisiana =

1978 Democratic Senate primary election in Louisiana
- September 16, 1978
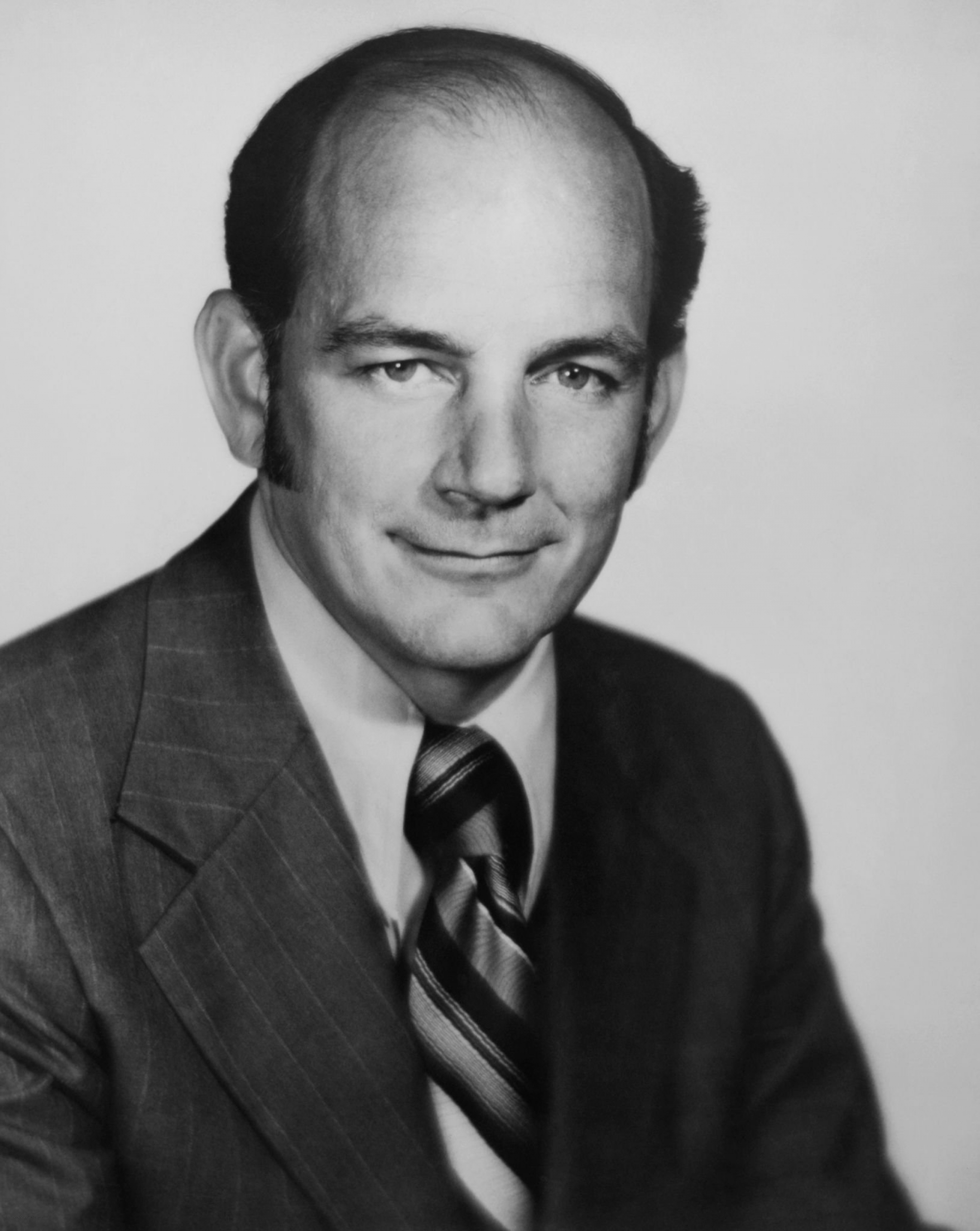

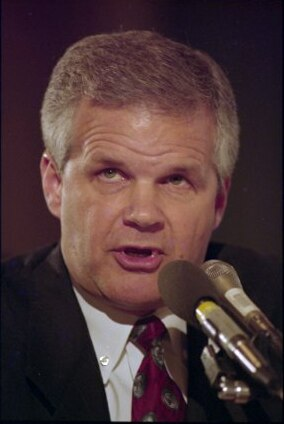
Nominee	J. Bennett Johnston	Woody Jenkins
Party	Democratic	Democratic
Popular vote	498,773	340,896
Percentage	59.40%	40.60%
- Parish results Johnston: 50–60% 60–70% 70–80% 80–90% Jenkins: 50–60%
U.S. senator before election
J. Bennett Johnston
Democratic
Elected U.S. Senator
J. Bennett Johnston
Democratic

The open primary election for the 1978 United States Senate election in Louisiana was held on September 16, 1978.

Incumbent Senator J. Bennett Johnston won the election with 59.40% of the vote and was declared elected by a majority, dispelling the need for a general election in November.

== Democratic Party ==
=== Candidates ===
==== Nominee ====
- J. Bennett Johnston, incumbent Senator

==== Lost in primary ====
- Woody Jenkins, state representative

== Results ==
=== Primary election ===
1978 U.S. Senate primary
Party	Candidate	Votes	%
Democratic	J. Bennett Johnston (incumbent)	498,773	59.4%
Democratic	Woody Jenkins	340,896	40.6%
Total votes		839,669	100%

=== General election ===
By virtue of Johnston's majority of the vote in the primary election, he was unopposed in the general election. Under Louisiana state law at the time, it was not required to tabulate votes for unopposed candidates.

== See also ==
- 1978 United States Senate elections
