= 1984 United States Senate election in Louisiana =

- September 29, 1984
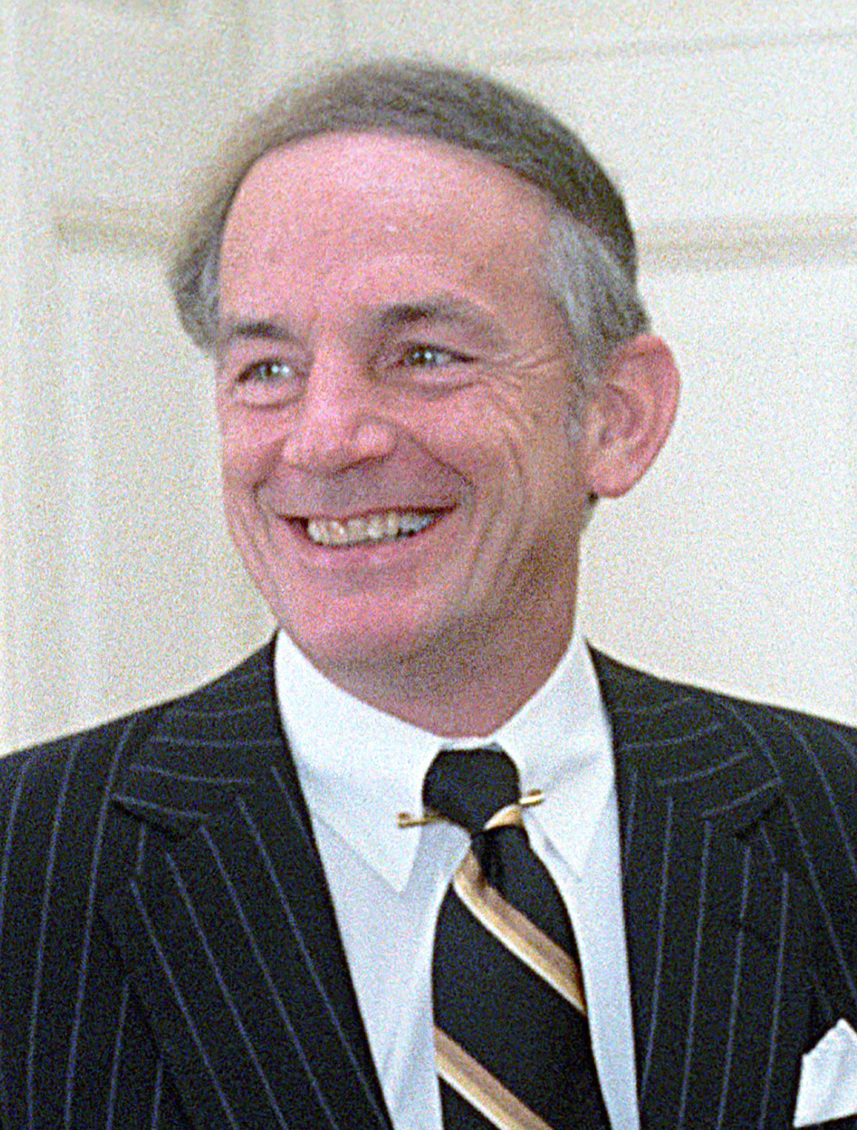

Nominee	J. Bennett Johnston	Robert M. Ross	Larry Napoleon Cooper
Party	Democratic	Republican	Republican
Popular vote	838,181	86,546	52,746
Percentage	85.75%	8.85%	5.40%
- Parish results Johnston: 70–80% 80–90% >90%
U.S. senator before election
J. Bennett Johnston
Democratic
Elected U.S. Senator
J. Bennett Johnston
Democratic

The primary election for the 1984 United States Senate election in Louisiana was held on September 29, 1984.

Incumbent Democratic Senator J. Bennett Johnston won the election with 85% of the vote and was declared elected by a majority, dispelling the need for a general election in November. This was despite Republican president Ronald Reagan carrying the state with more than 60% of the vote in the concurrent presidential election.

== Candidates ==
=== Democratic Party ===
- J. Bennett Johnston, incumbent Senator

=== Republican Party ===
- Larry Napoleon "Boogaloo" Cooper, former President of the NAACP Youth Council and candidate for Lt. Governor in 1983
- Robert M. Ross, perennial candidate

== Results ==
=== Primary election ===
1984 U.S. Senate primary
Party	Candidate	Votes	%
Democratic	J. Bennett Johnston (incumbent)	838,181	85.75%
Republican	Robert M. Ross	86,546	8.85%
Republican	Larry Napoleon "Boogaloo" Cooper	52,746	5.40%
Total votes		977,473	100%
Democratic hold			

=== General election ===
Under Section 511 of Title 18 of the Louisiana Revised Statutes, a candidate who received a majority of the votes in the Primary Election was declared elected. Johnston did not appear on the General Election ballot.

== See also ==
- 1984 United States Senate elections
