= William P. Curlin Jr. =

American politician (1933–2022)

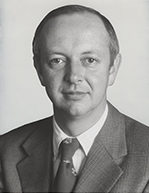

Member of the U.S. House of Representatives from Kentucky's 6th district
- In office December 4, 1971 – January 3, 1973
- Preceded by: John C. Watts
- Succeeded by: John B. Breckinridge

Member of the Kentucky House of Representatives from the 57th district
- In office January 1, 1968 – December 4, 1971
- Preceded by: Ralph Bates
- Succeeded by: Kenneth Wood

Personal details
- Born: William Prather Curlin Jr. November 30, 1933 Paducah, Kentucky, U.S.
- Died: December 12, 2022 (aged 89) Midway, Kentucky, U.S.
- Party: Democratic
- Education: University of Kentucky (AB, LLB)
- Profession: lawyer

Military service
- Allegiance: United States
- Branch/service: United States Army
- Years of service: 1955–1957

William Prather Curlin Jr. (November 30, 1933 – December 12, 2022) was an American politician and lawyer from Kentucky. He was a former member of the United States House of Representatives.

Born in Paducah, McCracken County, Kentucky, Curlin graduated from Frankfort High School. Curlin earned an A.B. and LL.B. from the University of Kentucky in 1958 and 1962, respectively. He served in the United States Army from 1955 to 1957.

As an attorney Curlin engaged in private practice and was an attorney and assistant commissioner with the Kentucky Department of Revenue from 1962 through 1964. He served as a member of the Kentucky General Assembly from 1968 to 1971 as a member of the Kentucky House of Representatives. In the House Curlin served as chairman of the Appropriations and Revenue Committee during the 1970 session.

Curlin was elected as a Democrat to the Ninety-second Congress by special election to fill the vacancy caused by the death of John C. Watts and served in Congress (from December 4, 1971, through January 3, 1973). He did not seek nomination to a full term in Congress in 1972 and returned to the private practice of law.

Curlin was a resident of Versailles, Kentucky, until his death in Midway, Kentucky on December 12, 2022. He was interred in the historic Frankfort Cemetery, Frankfort, Kentucky.

U.S. House of Representatives
Preceded by John C. Watts	Member of the U.S. House of Representatives from Kentucky's 6th congressional district December 4, 1971 – January 3, 1973	Succeeded by John B. Breckinridge
