= John C. Watts =

American politician (1902–1971)

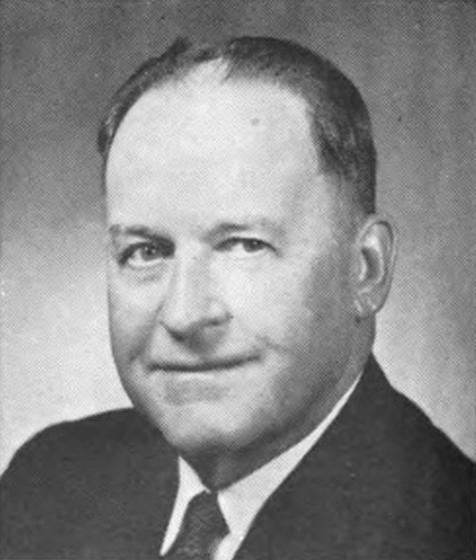

Member of the U.S. House of Representatives from Kentucky's 6th district
- In office April 4, 1951 – September 24, 1971
- Preceded by: Thomas R. Underwood
- Succeeded by: William P. Curlin Jr.

Member of the Kentucky House of Representatives from the 48th district
- In office January 1, 1948 – January 1, 1950
- Preceded by: Edgar Kitchen
- Succeeded by: Stanley Carter

Personal details
- Born: July 9, 1902 Nicholasville, Kentucky, U.S.
- Died: September 24, 1971 (aged 69) Lexington, Kentucky, U.S.
- Resting place: Maple Grove Cemetery; Nicholasville, Kentucky
- Party: Democratic
- Education: University of Kentucky

John Clarence Watts (July 9, 1902 – September 24, 1971) was a U.S. representative from Kentucky.

Born in Nicholasville, Kentucky, Watts attended the public schools. He graduated from the University of Kentucky in 1925 and from its law school in 1927. He was admitted to the bar in 1927 and commenced the practice of law in Nicholasville.

Watts also operated a farm, and served as police judge of Nicholasville from 1929 to 1933 and county attorney of Jessamine County, Kentucky from 1933 to 1945.

He served as a member of the State house of representatives from 1948 to 1950, and was floor leader. From 1948 to 1951 he served as commissioner of motor transportation for the Commonwealth of Kentucky.

Watts was elected as a Democrat to the Eighty-second Congress, by special election, April 4, 1951, to fill the vacancy caused by the resignation of Thomas R. Underwood. He was re-elected to the ten succeeding Congresses and served from April 4, 1951, until his death.

Watts did not sign the 1956 Southern Manifesto, and voted in favor of the Civil Rights Acts of 1960 and 1968, as well as the 24th Amendment to the U.S. Constitution and the Voting Rights Act of 1965. However, he voted against the Civil Rights Acts of 1957 and 1964. While serving as a congressman, Watts had a moderately liberal voting record.

He died from a stroke in Lexington, Kentucky on September 24, 1971, and was interred in Maple Grove Cemetery, Nicholasville, Kentucky.

== See also ==
- List of members of the United States Congress who died in office (1950–1999)

U.S. House of Representatives
Preceded by Thomas R. Underwood	U.S. Representative from Kentucky's 6th congressional district April 14, 1951-September 24, 1971	Succeeded by William P. Curlin, Jr.
