= Cliffard D. Carlson =

American politician

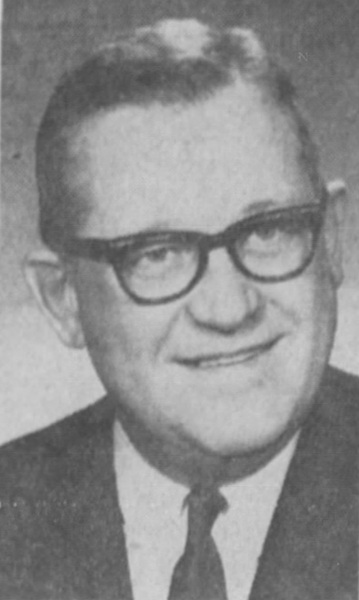
- Photo used in Carlson's congressional campaign in 1971 and 1972

Member of the U.S. House of Representatives from Illinois's 15th district
- In office April 4, 1972 – January 3, 1973
- Preceded by: Charlotte Thompson Reid
- Succeeded by: Leslie C. Arends

Personal details
- Born: December 30, 1915 Aurora, Illinois, U.S.
- Died: August 28, 1977 (aged 61) Dixon, Illinois, U.S.
- Party: Republican

Cliffard Dale Carlson (December 30, 1915 – August 28, 1977) was an American politician who was a U.S. representative from Illinois.

== Biography ==
Carlson was born and raised in Aurora, Illinois, and attended North Central College and received his B.A. from the University of New Mexico in 1939. After serving in the United States Naval Reserve, he entered business as a manufacturer. Carlson served as a delegate to the Republican National Conventions in 1960, 1964, and 1968, and was an Illinois Republican Central Committeeman.

In 1972, Carlson won a special election to fill the vacancy caused by the resignation of Charlotte Thompson Reid, and did not seek re-election. He took his seat on April 4, 1972, and served until January 3, 1973. He lost an election to rejoin the House in 1974.

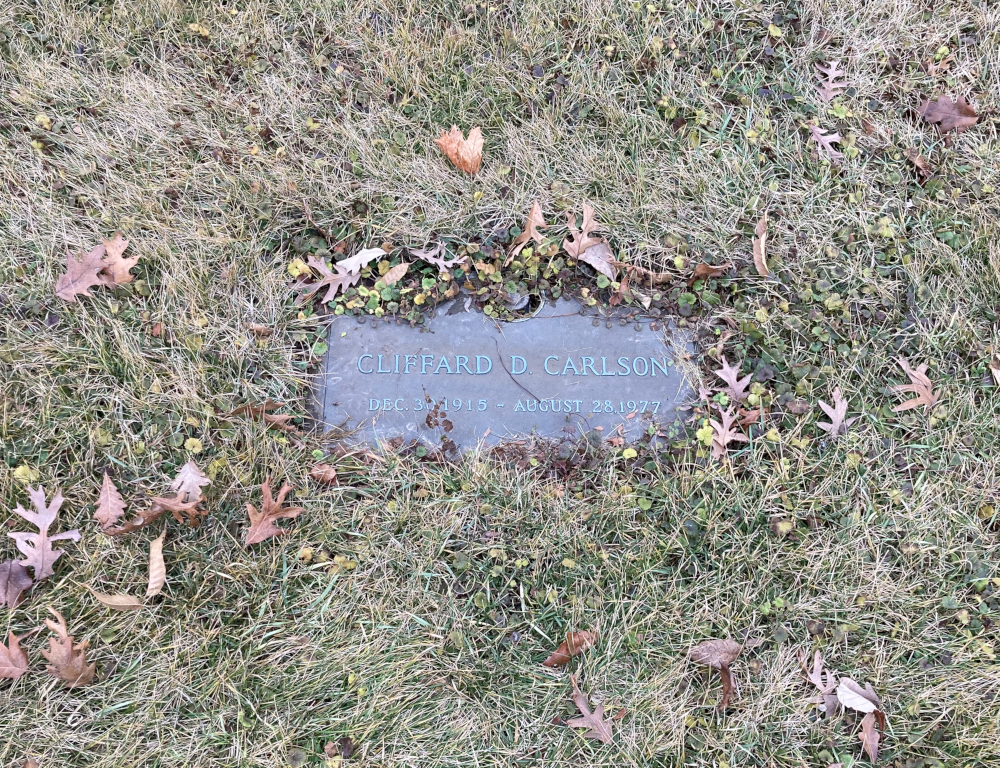
Carlson's grave at Oak Hill Cemetery

Carlson died in Dixon, Illinois on August 28, 1977, and is interred at Oak Hill Cemetery in Geneva, Illinois.

U.S. House of Representatives
Preceded by Charlotte Thompson Reid	Member of the U.S. House of Representatives from Illinois's 15th congressional district 1972–1973	Succeeded by Leslie C. Arends
