= LaMar Baker =

American politician (1915–2003)

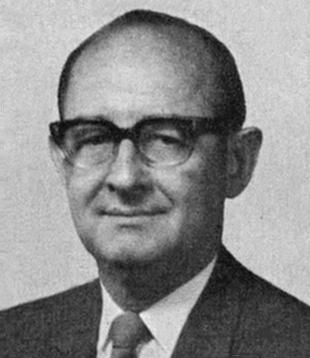

Member of the U.S. House of Representatives from Tennessee's 3rd district
- In office January 3, 1971 – January 3, 1975
- Preceded by: Bill Brock
- Succeeded by: Marilyn Lloyd

Personal details
- Born: December 29, 1915 Chattanooga, Tennessee, U.S.
- Died: June 20, 2003 (aged 87) Nashville, Tennessee, U.S.
- Party: Republican
- Education: Lipscomb University (attended); Harding University (BS)

Military service
- Branch/service: United States Army
- Unit: United States Army Air Forces
- Battles/wars: World War II

LaMar Baker (December 29, 1915 – June 20, 2003) was a Tennessee businessman and Republican political figure who served two terms in the United States House of Representatives from 1971 to 1975. Earlier, he had been a member of both houses of the Tennessee State Legislature.

== Biography ==
Born in Chattanooga, Tennessee, Baker attended public schools there and then David Lipscomb College, now Lipscomb University, in Nashville from 1936 to 1938. In 1940, he received a Bachelor of Science degree from Harding College in Searcy, Arkansas. Both Lipscomb and Harding are Churches of Christ institutions. During World War II, he served from 1942 to 1946 in the United States Army Air Forces, now the United States Air Force.

Baker was a successful Chattanooga-area businessman prior to his election in 1966 to the Tennessee House of Representatives. In 1968, he was elected to the Tennessee State Senate. In 1970, he received the Republican nomination for the Chattanooga-based Congressional District to replace Bill Brock, who was elected to the United States Senate. He won a very close race in November, undoubtedly aided by coattails of Brock and the Republican gubernatorial victor, Winfield Dunn.

Baker served two terms in Congress. He was reelected in the Republican landslide year of 1972, in which President Richard M. Nixon won all but five of Tennessee's ninety-five counties. Baker was a delegate to the 1972 Republican National Convention. In 1974, however, he was defeated for reelection by Democrat Marilyn Lloyd.

Two factors were involved in this defeat. One was the general unpopularity of Republicans in the wake of the Watergate scandal and Nixon's resignation earlier that year, which was played out in many usually competitive and marginally Republican districts throughout the country. The other was that Marilyn Lloyd was the widow of Mort Lloyd, an anchorman at CBS affiliate WDEF-TV, who had won the Democratic nomination to face Baker and who had then been killed in a light-airplane accident on his way to celebrate his primary victory; the Democratic Party then chose his wife to succeed him as the congressional nominee.

Baker lost badly in a rematch against Lloyd in 1976, when Jimmy Carter of Georgia won Tennessee's electoral votes. From 1981 to 1985, during the administration of U.S. President Ronald W. Reagan, Baker served as the regional representative to the United States Secretary of Transportation Drew Lewis. Baker lived his later years in Nashville and is interred in that city's Woodlawn Cemetery.

U.S. House of Representatives
Preceded by Bill Brock	Member of the U.S. House of Representatives from Tennessee's 3rd congressional district 1971–1975	Succeeded by Marilyn Lloyd
Party political offices
Preceded by Del Clawson	Chair of the Republican Study Committee; 1974–1975	Succeeded by Marjorie Holt
