= Elaine Edwards =

American politician (1929–2018)

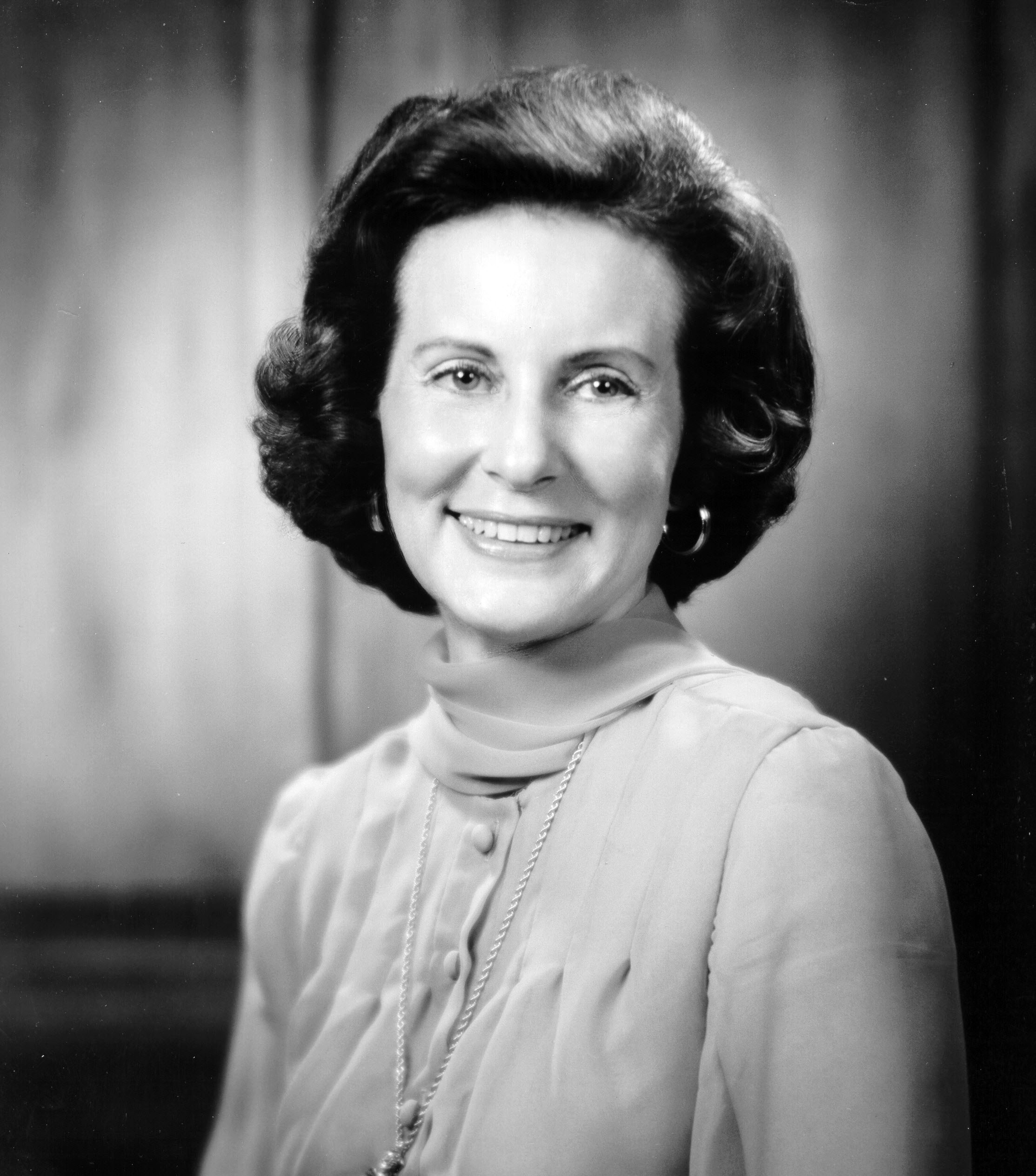

First Lady of Louisiana
- In role March 12, 1984 – March 14, 1988
- Governor: Edwin Edwards
- Preceded by: Dolores Treen
- Succeeded by: Patti Crocker Roemer
- In role May 9, 1972 – March 10, 1980
- Governor: Edwin Edwards
- Preceded by: Marjorie McKeithen
- Succeeded by: Dolores Treen

United States Senator from Louisiana
- In office August 1, 1972 – November 13, 1972
- Appointed by: Edwin Edwards
- Preceded by: Allen J. Ellender
- Succeeded by: J. Bennett Johnston

Personal details
- Born: Elaine Lucille Schwartzenburg; March 8, 1929 Marksville, Louisiana, U.S.
- Died: May 14, 2018 (aged 89) Denham Springs, Louisiana, U.S.
- Resting place: Resthaven Gardens of Memory and Mausoleum; Baton Rouge, Louisiana, U.S.
- Party: Democratic
- Spouse: Edwin Edwards (m. 1949; div. 1989)
- Children: 4

Elaine Lucille Edwards (née Schwartzenburg; March 8, 1929 – May 14, 2018) was an American politician from Louisiana. Edwards was a Democratic member of the United States Senate in 1972 appointed by her husband, Louisiana Governor Edwin Edwards, following the death of Allen J. Ellender.

She was the First Lady of Louisiana for twelve non-consecutive years from 1972 to 1980 and again from 1984 to 1988, making her the state's longest-serving First Lady. In her later years, she was a small fashion businesswoman and a low-profile soap opera actress based in New York City.

== Early life ==
Edwards was born in Marksville, the seat of Avoyelles Parish, to Errol Leo Schwartzenburg and Myrl Dupuy Schwartzenburg. Elaine was baptized Catholic, and had two brothers, Frank (1928–2013), and Ralph (born 1936).

She married Edwin Edwards in 1949. Her own Catholic belief was the impetus for Edwin's reversion to the Catholic faith. An observer noted that Elaine Edwards "wanted the opposite of what Edwin wanted. She hated the fishbowl of politics." Both graduated from Marksville High School. Discussing her marriage in 1984, Edwards said: "All I wanted to do was get married and have babies and keep house."

== Senate career ==
Edwards was the First Lady of Louisiana for twelve non-consecutive years from 1972 to 1980 and again from 1984 to 1988, making her the state's longest-serving First Lady. She did not live full-time at the Governor's mansion during her husband's third term, instead spending most of her time at the family's compound in southeastern Baton Rouge which they purchased during the term of Edwin's successor/predecessor, David C. Treen.

On August 1, 1972, after the death of Allen Ellender, Edwin Edwards appointed Elaine to the U.S. Senate to serve the remaining few months of Ellender's term.

In reaction to her Senate appointment, Edwards said: "This is a marvelous opportunity, and I accept it. But let's have no misgivings. I'm not a United States senator". Edwards did not seek election in November 1972. She resigned immediately upon certification of J. Bennett Johnston (whom her husband had defeated in the Democratic primary in the previous year's election for Governor) as the winner of the November 7, 1972 general election (in which Ellender had been a candidate until his death), allowing Johnston to gain seniority over other new senators elected on the same date.

During the 1976 presidential election campaign, Elaine endorsed Gerald Ford over Jimmy Carter, while her husband first endorsed California governor Jerry Brown, and later endorsed Carter after Brown failed to obtain the nomination.

In 1983, Edwin Edwards was re-elected as Governor thus making Elaine first lady again this time serving until 1988.

== Post-political career ==
After her senate tenure, Edwards owned a small business producing custom-made dresses and would continue this business even while serving as first lady during her husband's third term in the 1980s.

She moved to New York City in the 1990s to find occasional work as a soap opera actress.

== Personal life and death ==
Edwin and Elaine Edwards divorced in 1989 after forty years of marriage. The couple had four children, two daughters and two sons.

Elaine Edwards died on May 14, 2018, at her daughter's home in Denham Springs, Louisiana, while suffering from respiratory problems. Edwards was buried at Resthaven Gardens of Memory, Baton Rouge, East Baton Rouge Parish, Louisiana.

== See also ==
- Women in the United States Senate

U.S. Senate
Preceded by Allen J. Ellender	United States Senator (Class 3) from Louisiana; 1972; Served alongside: Russell B. Long	Succeeded by J. Bennett Johnston
