= J. Bennett Johnston =

American politician (1932–2025)

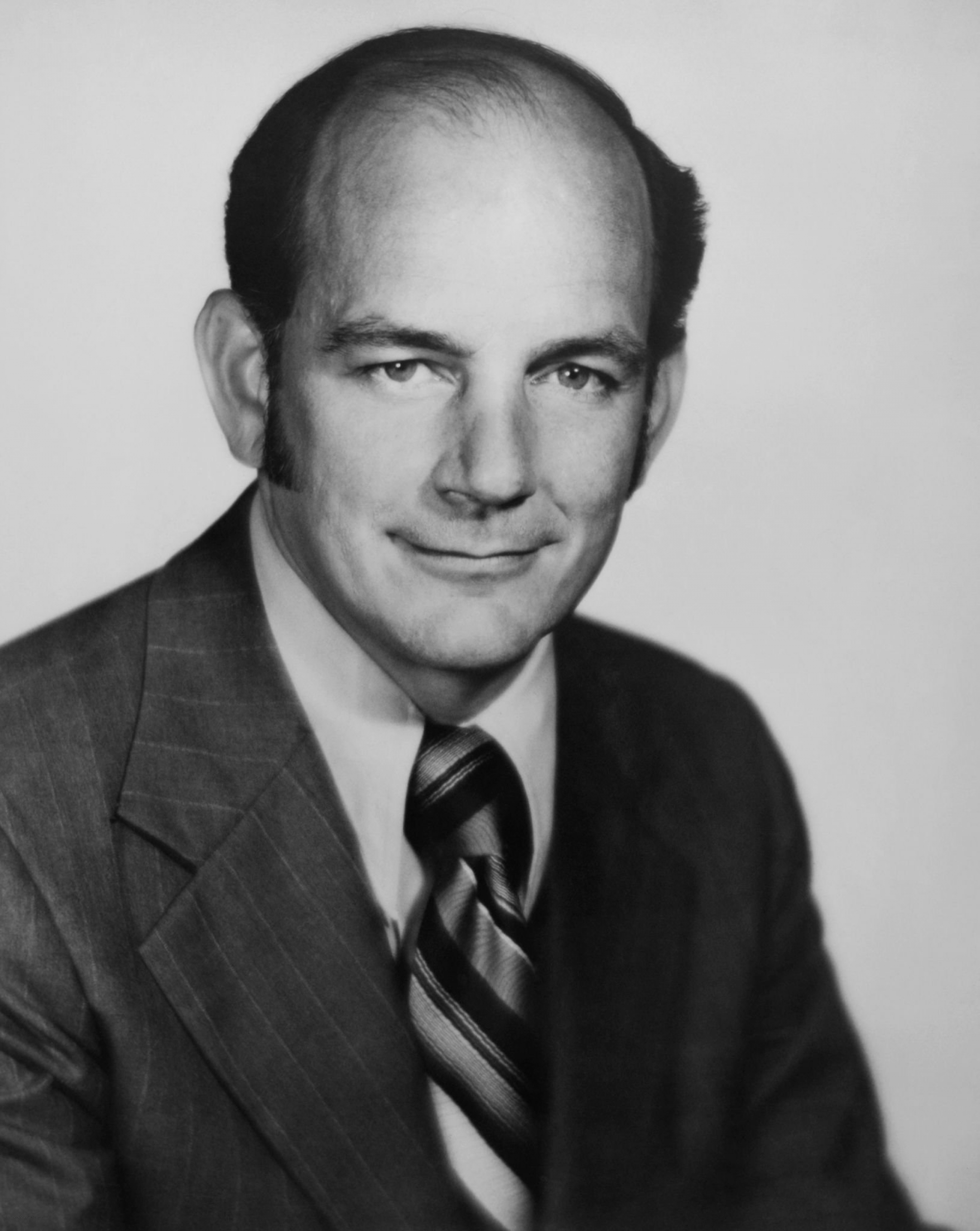
- Official portrait, 1980

United States Senator from Louisiana
- In office November 14, 1972 – January 3, 1997
- Preceded by: Elaine Edwards
- Succeeded by: Mary Landrieu

Member of the Louisiana Senate from the Caddo Parish at-large district
- In office 1968–1972
- Preceded by: Johnny Rogers (at-large); Jackson B. Davis
- Succeeded by: Constituency abolished

Member of the Louisiana House of Representatives from the Caddo Parish at-large district
- In office 1964–1968
- Preceded by: Wellborn Jack (at-large)
- Succeeded by: At-large delegation

Personal details
- Born: John Bennett Johnston Jr. June 10, 1932 Shreveport, Louisiana, U.S.
- Died: March 25, 2025 (aged 92) Arlington, Virginia, U.S.
- Resting place: Forest Park Cemetery, Shreveport, Louisiana
- Party: Democratic
- Spouse: Mary Hunter Gunn (m. 1956)
- Relations: Tim Roemer (son-in-law)
- Children: 4
- Education: Washington and Lee University; United States Military Academy; Louisiana State University (LLB)

Military service
- Allegiance: United States
- Branch: United States Army
- Service years: 1956–1959
- Unit: U.S. Army JAG Corps

John Bennett Johnston Jr. (June 10, 1932 – March 25, 2025) was an American attorney, politician, and later lobbyist from Louisiana who served as member of the United States Senate from 1972 to 1997. He had previously served in both houses of the Louisiana State Legislature representing Caddo Parish, Louisiana as a member of the Louisiana House of Representatives from 1964 to 1968 and as a member of the Louisiana State Senate from 1968 to 1972. He was a member of the Democratic Party.

Johnston was born in Shreveport, Louisiana, where he attended C. E. Byrd High School before enrolling in the United States Military Academy and Washington and Lee University. He received a law degree from Louisiana State University and served in the United States Army Judge Advocate General Corps from 1956 to 1959.

In 1964, Johnston was elected to represent Caddo Parish in the Louisiana House of Representatives. In 1968, he was elected to the Louisiana State Senate. As a state legislator, Johnston held moderate-to-conservative views and unsuccessfully pushed for a toll road connecting Shreveport with South Louisiana, which at the time had no interstate highway connection. In 1971, he unsuccessfully ran for Governor of Louisiana, narrowly losing the Democratic primary to Edwin Edwards.

Shortly after his unsuccessful 1971 campaign for governor, Johnston challenged incumbent U.S. Senate member Allen J. Ellender. When Ellender died before the primary election, Johnston was easily nominated and won the general election without opposition. He was re-elected to three terms; his final re-election campaign against former Grand Wizard of the Ku Klux Klan David Duke in 1990 was the closest and highest-profile of his four campaigns, and he won bipartisan support against Duke. From 1987 to 1995, Johnston was chair of the United States Senate Committee on Energy and Natural Resources and widely recognized as the preeminent American legislator on energy policy.

== Early life and education ==
Johnston was born on June 10, 1932, in Shreveport, Louisiana, to the attorney John Bennett Johnston Sr. and the former Wilma Lyon.

After Southfield, Johnston attended and graduated from C. E. Byrd High School in Shreveport. He attended the United States Military Academy in West Point, New York, and Washington and Lee University in Lexington, Virginia.

In 1956, Johnston graduated from Paul M. Hebert Law Center of Louisiana State University in Baton Rouge, Louisiana. He was then admitted to the bar that same year. Johnston attended The Judge Advocate General's Legal Center and School at the University of Virginia and entered United States Army Judge Advocate General's Corps. He served in the United States Army, Judge Advocate General Corps in Germany from 1956 to 1959.

== Marriage and family ==
Johnston married Mary Hunter Gunn, a native of Natchitoches, Louisiana, on August 11, 1956, in her hometown. Johnston was a member of the Baptist Church; and his wife is Roman Catholic. They had four children together: J. Bennett Johnston III, N. Hunter Johnston, Mary Norriss, and Sally Roemer, who were raised as Catholic.

Their daughter Sally married Tim Roemer, a native of Indiana in 1989, a Democratic Party politician who served as a member of the United States House of Representatives from 1991 to 2003 representing Indiana's 3rd congressional district.

They had a total of 10 grandchildren.

== Political life ==
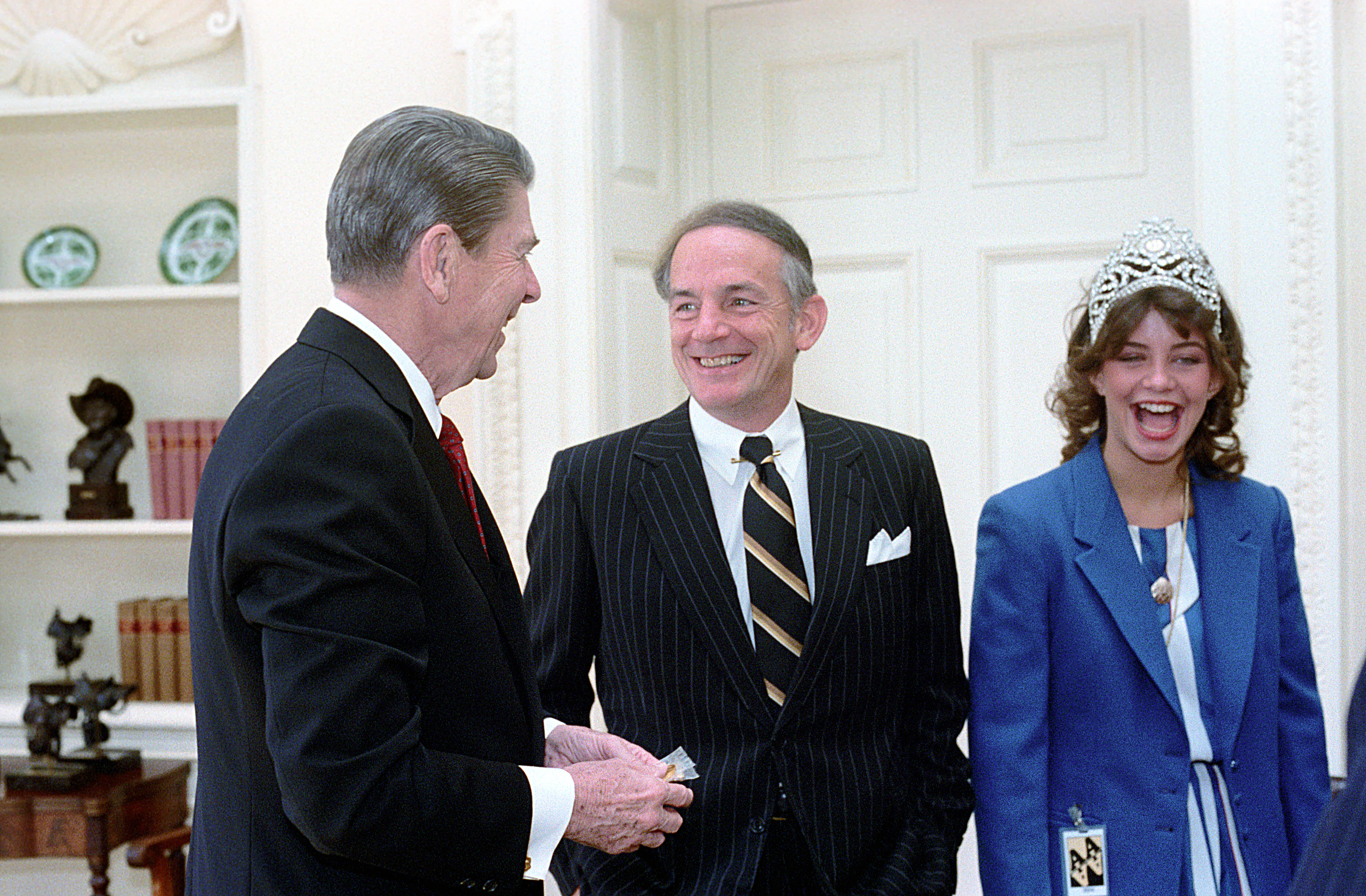
Johnston and his daughter Sally with President Ronald Reagan on January 21, 1983

Johnston had joined the Democratic Party and decided to run for office, beginning at the local level. In 1964, he was elected to the Louisiana House of Representatives.

In 1966, Johnston hired Ralph Perlman to the legislative staff; he was a business graduate of Columbia University in New York City. Soon Governor of Louisiana John McKeithen appointed Perlman as state budget director, where he served from 1967 to 1988.

In 1970, State Senator Johnston outlined his proposal for a toll road to connect Shreveport with South Louisiana, as there was no north–south interstate highway at the time. Johnston said the state gasoline tax was bringing in only 20 percent of what was needed to construct such a north–south highway. Therefore, he proposed using tolls to raise the necessary revenue, as they applied only to users. While his proposal was not approved, later the federally subsidized Interstate 49 was built, linking Shreveport with Lafayette, Louisiana. Most of the highway was opened in the early 1990s. Interstate connections were created from Lafayette to Baton Rouge and New Orleans.

He was known for holding moderate-to-conservative views.

=== Campaigns for governor ===
In 1971, Johnston ran for Governor of Louisiana. Harmon Drew Jr. headed the Johnston college campaign. Drew said that Johnston represented a "new outlook this state must have." Johnston narrowly lost this race by 4,488 votes to Edwin Edwards in the two-round election of the Democratic primary. This was the last Louisiana gubernatorial election to be held prior to the state's adoption of the nonpartisan primary in 1975. Edwards' margin was fewer than two votes per precinct. Drew later served as a judge of the Louisiana Circuit Courts of Appeal, for the second circuit.

Edwards defeated Republican Dave Treen in the general election for governor held on February 1, 1972. Treen was elected to the United States House of Representatives in November 1972. He was re-elected, serving until his election as governor in 1979.

== U.S. Senate campaigns ==
In 1972, Johnston challenged the long-term incumbent, Allen J. Ellender, for the Democratic nomination to the U.S. Senate. Ellender died during the campaign, and Johnston, with powerful name identification stemming from his gubernatorial bid months earlier, won the primary easily. In the primary, Johnston received 623,076 votes (79.4 percent); Frank T. Allen, 88,198 votes (11.2 percent), and the deceased Ellender, 73,088 votes (9.3 percent).

Johnston defeated Republican Ben C. Toledano, a New Orleans attorney and a former candidate for Mayor of New Orleans, and former Governor of Louisiana John McKeithen of Columbia, Louisiana, a fellow Democrat who ran as an Independent politician in the general election because the filing period was not reopened upon Ellender's death.

McKeithen, the first Louisiana governor to serve two consecutive terms, left office six months prior to the Senate election in order to conduct his campaign.

The creation of the interim position was done to swear in Johnston immediately upon certification of his election, allowing him to gain an edge in seniority over other senators who first took office during the 93rd United States Congress. Johnston's freshman classmates included Joe Biden (D-Delaware), who served seven terms before being elected as vice president and later President, Sam Nunn (D-Georgia), who served four terms, Jesse Helms (R-North Carolina), who served five terms, and Pete Domenici (R-New Mexico), who served six terms.

For a time, Johnston's director of special projects was James Arthur Reeder (1933–2012), a former Shreveport and Washington, D.C., attorney, and owner of a chain of radio stations. Like Johnston, Reeder was later inducted into the Louisiana Political Museum and Hall of Fame in the town of Winnfield, Louisiana. Later Reeder organized voter registration drives in Caddo Parish to empower minority voters. In 2009, Reeder narrated the inaugural parade of U.S. President Barack Obama.

In 1976, Johnston would serve as the chair for Jimmy Carter's presidential campaign in Louisiana. However, he would later turn against Carter after Carter would continuously block funding for water projects which Johnston regarded as important for Louisiana's economy; Carter deemed the projects to be pork barrel.

In 1978, Johnston defeated Democratic State Representative Woody Jenkins of Baton Rouge in the nonpartisan primary, 498,773 (59.4 percent) to 340,896 (40.6 percent). (Jenkins later shifted to the Republican Party.)

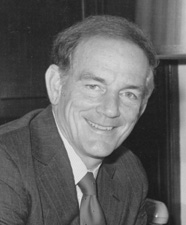
Johnston as U.S. senator

Johnston's closest re-election race was in 1990 against State Representative David Duke, a former Ku Klux Klan man and Republican candidate, who was not endorsed by his party's leadership. Louisiana State Senate member Ben Bagert of New Orleans dropped out of the primary race in a bid to try to prevent a runoff battle between Johnston and Duke. Eight Republican U.S. Senate members endorsed Johnston over Duke. These included Ted Stevens and Frank Murkowski of Alaska, David Durenberger and Rudy Boschwitz of Minnesota, John Danforth of Missouri, William Cohen of Maine, Warren Rudman of New Hampshire, and Nancy Kassebaum of Kansas. Former U.S. House of Representatives member Jack Kemp of New York, who served as United States Secretary of Housing and Urban Development from 1989 to 1993 during the Presidency of George H. W. Bush, also endorsed Johnston.

Johnston defeated Duke in the primary, 752,902 votes (53.9 percent), to 607,391 votes (43.5 percent), far less than expected. Other candidates took the remaining 35,820 votes (2.5 percent). Johnston retired after his fourth term ended in 1997; he was succeeded by his choice for the seat, fellow Democrat Mary Landrieu of New Orleans, daughter of former Mayor of New Orleans Moon Landrieu, who served as U.S. Secretary of Housing and Urban Development from 1979 to 1981 during the Presidency of Jimmy Carter.

He developed close friendships with Republican Presidents Richard Nixon, Ronald Reagan and George H. W. Bush, while also locking horns with Carter. However, he would also praise Bill Clinton, who he described as "extremely bright."

== Notable achievements ==
Johnston broke with his party in 1991 to authorize the use of military force in the Gulf War in Iraq. He also broke ranks to support the narrowly achieved confirmation of Clarence Thomas as associate justice of the U.S. Supreme Court. In 1987, Johnston had voted with his Democratic majority against President Ronald Reagan's choice of Robert Bork, former judge of the U.S. Court of Appeals for the District of Columbia Circuit Appeals, for elevation to the U.S. Supreme Court.

Johnston was one of the few Senate Democrats to vote against the Budget Act of 1993, which was strongly supported by President Bill Clinton. He repeatedly voted against the Balanced budget amendment and giving the President the line-item veto, both of which were measures strongly favored by fiscal conservatives in both parties. On foreign policy issues, he frequently voted with more liberal Democrats to terminate restrictions on travel to communist Cuba, and in support of the United Nations and foreign aid. Johnston was the only member of either chamber of Congress to vote against a 1995 resolution to allow President of the Republic of China Lee Teng-hui, a Taiwanese politician, to visit the United States.

During his tenure as Chairman of the Senate Energy and Natural Resources Committee, he was recognized as the nation's pre-eminent legislator on energy policy of the United States. One of his major concerns was the threat of anthropogenic climate change.

Johnston was a firm advocate of the Flag Desecration Amendment. He opposed abortion and most gun control measures.

In 1988, Johnston sought the position of Senate Majority Leader but lost to George J. Mitchell of Maine. From 1972 to 1987, Johnston served alongside fellow Democratic U.S. Senate member Russell B. Long, with whom he worked closely to deliver federal spending to Louisiana. Johnston and Long gained authorization of the Cane River National Heritage Area in Natchitoches Parish, Louisiana in 1994, which stimulated tourism in the region. Johnston delivered a eulogy at Long's funeral in 2003.

== Later life and death ==
After he left the Senate, Johnston formed Johnston & Associates LLC, a lobbying group. In 2008, Steptoe LLP, a major international law firm, formed a "strategic alliance" with Johnston. Steptoe added three members from Johnston & Associates to the firm.

Johnston and former U.S. Senate member Howard Baker of Tennessee co-chaired the National Parks Second Century Commission.

In 1997, Johnston was elected to the board of directors of Chevron Corporation. He had left the board by 2011.

Johnston was one of the advisory directors at Freeport-McMoRan Copper & Gold and Angeleno Group, an energy-based investment group.

Johnston lived in Sperryville, Virginia, and McLean, Virginia, in later years. He died from complications of COVID-19 and other unspecified conditions at a hospital in Arlington, Virginia, on March 25, 2025, age 92. His casket, which was draped with the American flag, was transferred to the Kilpatrick's Rose-Neath Funeral Home in Shreveport by April 1 after returning to Louisiana when it was received by Caddo Parish deputies at the Texas-Louisiana state line. On April 2, 2025, his funeral was held at Rose-Neath Funeral Home, and was then afterward escorted by Caddo Parish to the Forest Lake Cemetery in the St. Vincent area of Shreveport, Louisiana. Both his funeral visitation and graveside service were open to the public. He was interred at the Forest Lake Cemetery with full military honors.

== Legacy and honors ==
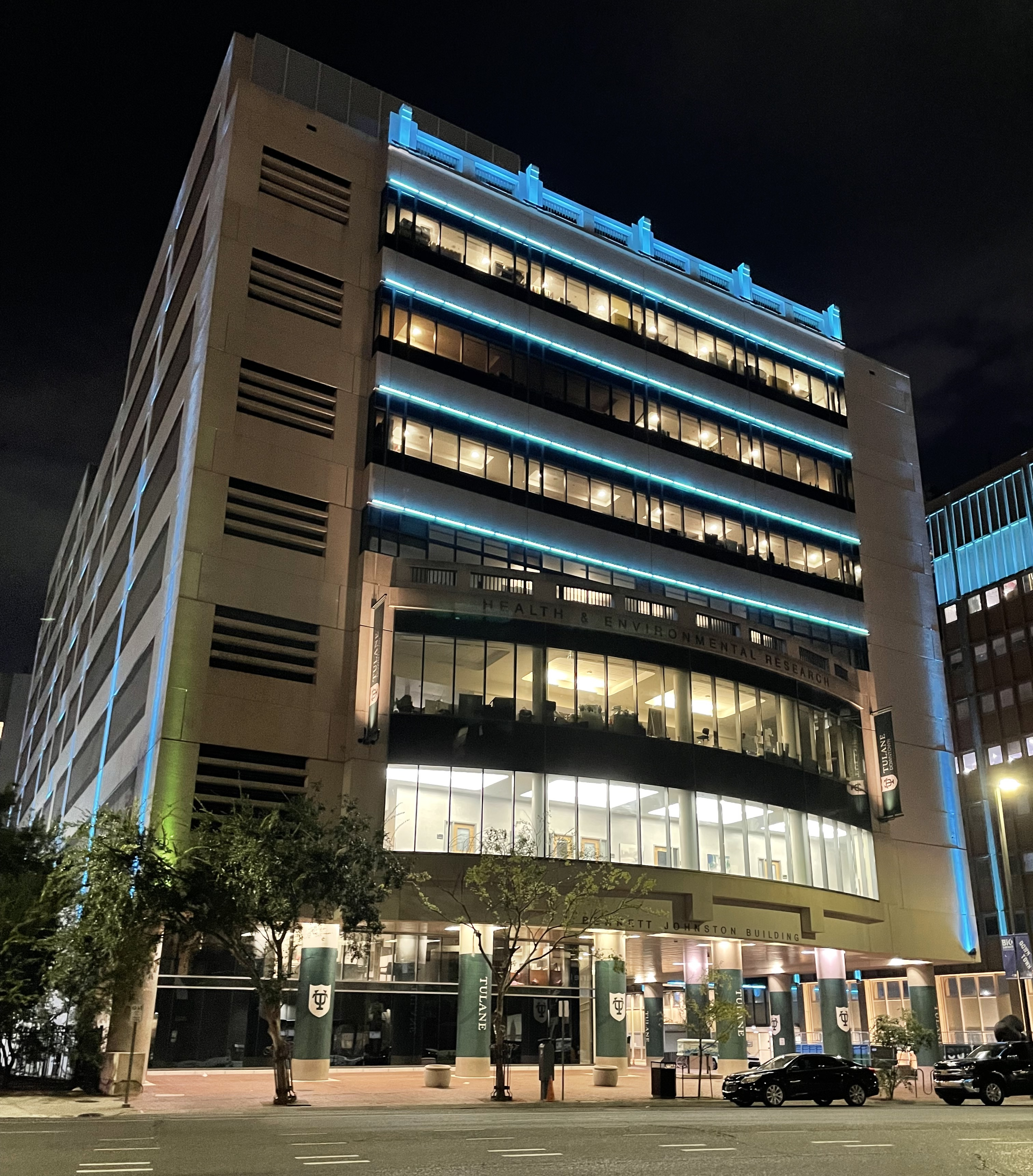
The J. Bennett Johnston Health and Environmental Research Building on the Downtown Campus of Tulane University.

- The J. Bennett Johnston Waterway, located in a section of the Red River of the South that is based in Shreveport, Louisiana, is named in his honor.
- Southern University at Shreveport named its video conferencing room in Johnston's honor. It is located inside Stone Hall, named for Jesse N. Stone, the late civil rights activist and former president of the Southern University System.
- In 2010, Johnston received the National Parks Conservation Association Centennial Leadership Award.
- A quadrangle on Tulane University's main campus is named “The J Bennett Johnston Quadrangle” in his honor. A building on Tulane University's downtown campus is named “The J. Bennett Johnston Health and Environmental Research Building" also in his honor.

== See also ==
- United States energy law

Party political offices
Preceded by Allen J. Ellender	Democratic nominee for U.S. Senator from Louisiana (Class 2); 1972, 1978, 1984, 1990	Succeeded by Mary Landrieu
Preceded by Lloyd Bentsen	Chair of the Democratic Senatorial Campaign Committee; 1976–1977	Succeeded by Wendell Ford
Vacant Title last held by Ted Stevens; John Rhodes	Response to the State of the Union address 1982; Served alongside: Robert Byrd, Alan Cranston, Al Gore, Gary Hart, Ted Kennedy, Tip O'Neill, Donald Riegle, Paul Sarbanes, Jim Sasser	Succeeded by Les AuCoin, Joe Biden, Bill Bradley, Robert Byrd, Tom Daschle, Bill Hefner, Barbara B. Kennelly, George Miller, Tip O'Neill, Paul Tsongas, Tim Wirth
U.S. Senate
Preceded by Elaine Edwards	U.S. Senator (Class 2) from Louisiana; 1972–1997; Served alongside: Russell B. Long, John Breaux	Succeeded by Mary Landrieu
Preceded by Henry M. Jackson	Ranking Member of the Senate Energy Committee; 1983–1987	Succeeded by Jim McClure
Preceded by Jim McClure	Chair of the Senate Energy Committee; 1987–1995	Succeeded by Frank Murkowski
Preceded by Jim McClure	Ranking Member of the Senate Energy Committee; 1995–1997	Succeeded by Dale Bumpers
