= Allen J. Ellender =

American politician (1890–1972)

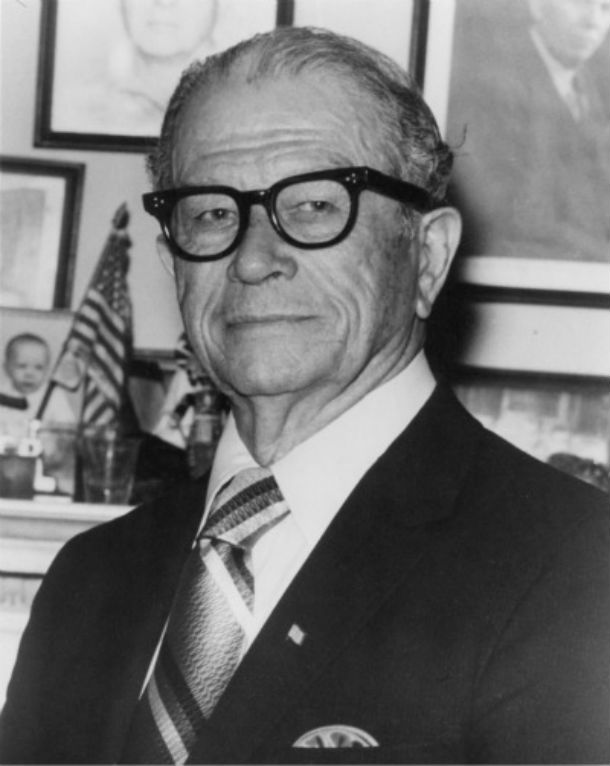
- Official portrait, c. 1970

President pro tempore of the United States Senate
- In office January 21, 1971 – July 27, 1972
- Preceded by: Richard Russell Jr.
- Succeeded by: James Eastland

United States Senator from Louisiana
- In office January 3, 1937 – July 27, 1972
- Preceded by: Rose McConnell Long
- Succeeded by: Elaine Edwards
Committee chairmanships
Chair of the Senate Appropriations Committee
In office January 21, 1971 – July 27, 1972
Preceded by	Richard Russell Jr.
Succeeded by	John McClellan
Chair of the Senate Agriculture Committee
In office January 3, 1955 – January 21, 1971
Preceded by	George Aiken
Succeeded by	Herman Talmadge
In office January 3, 1951 – January 3, 1953
Preceded by	Elmer Thomas
Succeeded by	George Aiken

54th Speaker of the Louisiana House of Representatives
- In office 1932–1936
- Governor: Alvin Olin King; Oscar K. Allen
- Preceded by: John B. Fournet
- Succeeded by: Lorris M. Wimberly

Personal details
- Born: September 24, 1890 Montegut, Louisiana, U.S.
- Died: July 27, 1972 (aged 81) Bethesda, Maryland, U.S.
- Party: Democratic
- Spouse: Helen Calhoun Donnelly (m. 1917; died 1949)
- Children: 1
- Education: Tulane University
- Profession: Lawyer

Military service
- Allegiance: United States
- Branch/service: United States Army
- Years of service: 1918
- Rank: Private
- Battles/wars: World War I

Allen Joseph Ellender (September 24, 1890 – July 27, 1972) was an American politician and lawyer who was a U.S. senator from Louisiana from 1937 until his death in 1972. He was a Democrat who was originally allied with Huey Long. As Senator he had a generally conservative record, voting 77% of the time with the Conservative Coalition on domestic issues. A staunch segregationist, he signed the Southern Manifesto in 1956, voted against the Voting Rights Act of 1965, and opposed anti-lynching legislation in 1938. Unlike many Democrats he was not a "hawk" in foreign policy and opposed the Vietnam War.

Ellender served as President Pro Tempore, and the chair of the Senate Appropriations Committee. He also served as the chair of the Senate Agriculture Committee for over 18 years.

== Early life ==
Ellender was born in the town of Montegut in Terrebonne Parish. He was the son of Victoria Marie (Javeaux) and Wallace Richard Ellender, Sr. He attended public and private schools, and in 1909 he graduated with a Bachelor of Arts degree from the Roman Catholic St. Aloysius College in New Orleans. (It has been reorganized as Brother Martin High School). He graduated from Tulane University Law School with an LL.B. in 1913, was admitted to the bar later that year, and launched his practice in Houma.

=== World War I ===
Though he received a draft deferment for World War I, Ellender volunteered for military service. Initially rejected on medical grounds after being diagnosed with a kidney stone, Ellender persisted in attempting to serve in uniform. After surgery and recovery, Ellender inquired through his Congressman about obtaining a commission in the Army's Judge Advocate General Corps, and was offered a commission as an interpreter and translator in the United States Marine Corps, which he declined over concerns that because he spoke Louisiana French, he might not be proficient enough in the formal French language.

While taking courses to improve his French, he also applied for a position in the Student Army Training Corps at Tulane University. He was accepted into the program in October 1918, and reported to Camp Martin on the Tulane University campus. The war ended in November, and the SATC program was disbanded, so Ellender was released from the service in December before completing his training. Despite attempts lasting into the late 1920s to secure an honorable discharge as proof of his military service, Ellender was unsuccessful in obtaining one. Instead, the commander of Camp Martin replied to an inquiry from Ellender's congressman that "Private Allen J. Ellender" had been released from military service in compliance with an army order prohibiting new enlistments in the SATC after the Armistice of November 11, 1918. As his career progressed, his biography often included the incorrect claim that Ellender had served as a sergeant in the United States Army Artillery Corps during the war.

=== State politics ===
Ellender was a delegate to the Louisiana constitutional convention in 1921. The constitution produced by that body was retired in 1974, two years after Ellender's death. He served in the Louisiana House of Representatives from 1924 to 1936. He was floor leader from 1928 to 1932, when in 1929 he worked successfully against the impeachment forces, led by Ralph Norman Bauer and Cecil Morgan, that attempted to remove Governor Huey Long for a litany of abuses of power. Ellender was the House Speaker from 1932 to 1936, when he was elected to the US Senate.

Ellender wrote positively about Long, once writing that “if dictatorship in Louisiana, such as was charged to Huey Long, will give to the people of our nation what it gave to the people of my native state, then I am for such a dictatorship.”

== U.S. Senator ==
In 1937 he took his Senate seat, formerly held by the fallen Huey Long and slated for the Democratic nominee Oscar Kelly Allen, Sr., of Winnfield, the seat of Long's home parish of Winn. Allen had won the Democratic nomination by a plurality exceeding 200,000 votes, but he died shortly thereafter. His passing enabled Ellender's election. The Democrats had so dominated state politics since the disfranchisement of most blacks at the turn of the century, that the primary was the decisive election for offices.

Ellender was one of twenty liberal Democratic senators in July 1937 who voted against killing the Judicial Procedures Reform Bill of 1937, which was introduced by President Franklin D. Roosevelt in an effort to pack the United States Supreme Court following several anti-New Deal decisions from the Court.

Ellender was repeatedly re-elected to the Senate and served until his death in 1972. He gained seniority and great influence. He was the leading sponsor of the federal free lunch program, which was enacted in 1945 and continues; it was a welfare program that helped poor students.

In 1946, Ellender defended fellow Southern demagogue Theodore Bilbo, who incited violence against blacks in his re-election campaign. When a petition was filed to the Senate, a committee chaired by Ellender investigated the voter suppression. Ellender defended the violent attacks on blacks trying to vote as the result of "tradition and custom" rather than Bilbo's incitements. The committee voted on party lines to clear Bilbo, with the three Democrats siding with the Mississippi demagogue while the two conservative Republicans, Bourke Hickenlooper of Iowa and Styles Bridges of New Hampshire, dissented from the verdict. Bilbo, however, ultimately did not take his Senate seat due to medical issues and died a short time later.

Ellender served as the powerful chairman of the Senate Agriculture Committee from 1951 to 1953 and 1955 to 1971, through which capacity he was a strong defender of sugar cane interests. He chaired the even more powerful Senate Appropriations Committee from 1971 until his death. Denoting his seniority as a Democrat in the Senate, Ellender was President pro tempore of the U.S. Senate from 1971 to 1972, an honorific position.

Ellender was an opponent of Republican Senator Joseph McCarthy of Wisconsin, who had achieved national prominence through a series of well-publicized speeches and investigations attacking supposed communist infiltration in the US government, army and educational institutions during the 1950s.

In March 1952, Ellender stated the possibility of the House of Representatives electing the president in that year's general election and added that the possibility could arise from the entry of Georgia Senator Richard Russell, Jr. into the general election as a third-party candidate and thereby see neither President Truman or Republican Senator Robert A. Taft able to secure enough votes from the Electoral College.

Ellender strongly opposed the federal civil rights legislation, voting against the Civil Rights Acts of 1957, the Civil Rights Acts of 1960, the Civil Rights Acts of 1964, and the Civil Rights Acts of 1968 as well as the 24th Amendment to the U.S. Constitution. Ellender opposed the Voting Rights Act of 1965 to enforce blacks' constitutional rights in voting. Many, particularly in the Deep South, had been disfranchised since 1900. In the aftermath of the Duck Hill lynchings, he also helped block a proposed anti-lynching bill which had previously been passed in the House, proclaiming, "We shall at all cost preserve the white supremacy of America." He did support some Louisiana state legislation sought by civil rights groups, such as repeal of the state poll tax (a disfranchisement mechanism).

In late 1962 he underwent a tour of East Africa. In Southern Rhodesia he spoke to the media and was reported by a newspaper to have said he did not believe African territories were ready for self-governance and "incapable of leadership" without the assistance of white people. He was further reported to have said apartheid in South Africa was a proper policy choice and should have been instituted sooner. Ellender later denied making these remarks, but Uganda and Tanganyika responded to the allegations by barring him from entering their countries.

On August 31, 1964, during President Johnson's signing of the Food Stamp Act of 1964, the president noted Ellender as one of the members of Congress he wanted to compliment for playing "a role in the passage of this legislation".

== Last campaign, death, and aftermath ==
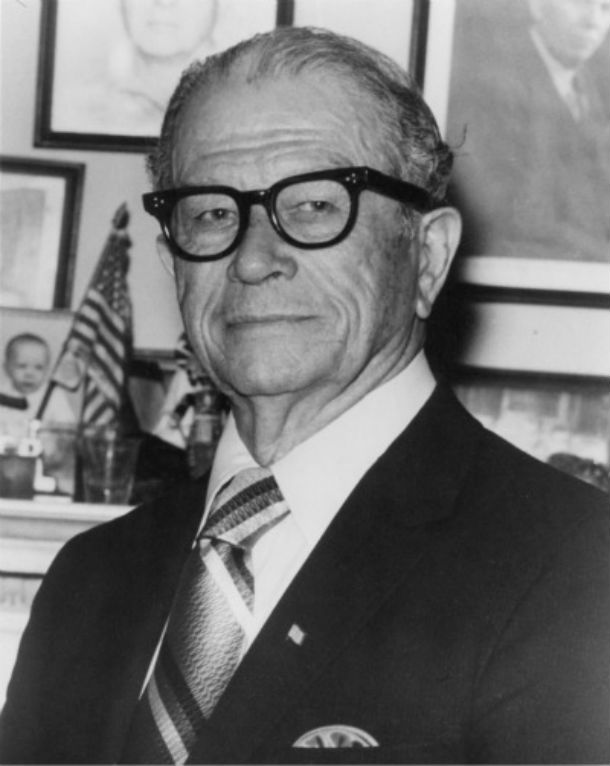
Ellender late in his career

In 1972, the Democratic gubernatorial runner-up from December 1971, former state senator J. Bennett Johnston, Jr., of Shreveport, challenged Ellender for renomination. Ellender was expected to defeat Johnston, but he died from a heart attack on July 27, aged 81, at Bethesda Naval Hospital. Nearly 10 percent of Democratic voters, however, still voted for the deceased Ellender.

The Ellender family endorsed McKeithen in the 1972 general election because of resentment over Johnston's entry into the race against Ellender. Ellender's immediate successor was not Johnston but Elaine S. Edwards, first wife of Governor Edwin Edwards, who was appointed to fill his seat from August 1, 1972, to November 13, 1972. Six days after the election, Johnston was appointed to finish Ellender's remaining term to gain a seniority advantage over other freshman senators.

== See also ==
- List of members of the United States Congress who died in office (1950–1999)

Party political offices
Preceded by Rose McConnell Long	Democratic nominee for U.S. Senator from Louisiana (Class 2); 1936, 1942, 1948, 1954, 1960, 1966	Succeeded by J. Bennett Johnston
Political offices
Preceded by Reuben Chauvin; Dr. N. V. Marmande	Louisiana State Representative from Terrebonne Parish; 1924-1936	Succeeded by Morris Lottinger Sr.
Preceded by John B. Fournet	Speaker of the Louisiana House of Representatives; 1932–1936	Succeeded by Lorris M. Wimberly
Preceded by Richard Russell Jr.	President pro tempore of the U.S. Senate; 1971–1972	Succeeded by James Eastland
U.S. Senate
Preceded by Rose McConnell Long	U.S. senator (Class 2) from Louisiana; 1937–1972; Served alongside: John H. Overton, William C. Feazel, Russell B. Long	Succeeded by Elaine Edwards
Preceded by Elmer Thomas	Chair of the Senate Agriculture Committee; 1951–1953	Succeeded by George Aiken
Preceded by George Aiken	Ranking Member of the Senate Agriculture Committee; 1953–1955	Succeeded by George Aiken
Preceded by George Aiken	Chair of the Senate Agriculture Committee; 1955–1971	Succeeded by Herman Talmadge
Preceded by Richard Russell Jr.	Chair of the Senate Appropriations Committee; 1971–1972	Succeeded by John L. McClellan
Honorary titles
Preceded by Richard Russell Jr.	Dean of the U.S. Senate; 1971–1972	Succeeded by George Aiken
Preceded by Richard Russell Jr.	Most senior Democrat in the U.S. Senate; 1971–1972	Succeeded by James Eastland; John L. McClellan
