= United States Senate Appropriations Subcommittee on Transportation, Housing and Urban Development, and Related Agencies =

The U.S. Senate Appropriations Subcommittee on Transportation, Housing and Urban Development, and Related Agencies (THUD, informally) is one of twelve subcommittees of the U.S. Senate Committee on Appropriations. It was formerly known as the Subcommittee on Transportation, Treasury, the Judiciary, Housing and Urban Development, and Related Agencies, but responsibility for Treasury and Judiciary funding was transferred to the Subcommittee on Financial Services and General Government in 2007. The United States Senate Committee on Appropriations has joint jurisdiction with the United States House Committee on Appropriations over all appropriations bills in the United States Congress. Each committee has 12 matching subcommittees, each of which is tasked with working on one of the twelve annual regular appropriations bills. This subcommittee has jurisdiction over the budget for the United States Department of Transportation and the United States Department of Housing and Urban Development.

== Appropriations process ==
Traditionally, after a federal budget for the upcoming fiscal year has been passed, the appropriations subcommittees receive information about what the budget sets as their spending ceilings. This is called "302(b) allocations" after section 302(b) of the Congressional Budget Act of 1974. That amount is separated into smaller amounts for each of the twelve Subcommittees. The federal budget does not become law and is not signed by the President. Instead, it is guide for the House and the Senate in making appropriations and tax decisions. However, no budget is required and each chamber has procedures in place for what to do without one. The House and Senate now consider appropriations bills simultaneously, although originally the House went first. The House Committee on Appropriations usually reports the appropriations bills in May and June and the Senate in June. Any differences between appropriations bills passed by the House and the Senate are resolved in the fall.

== Appropriations bills ==
An appropriations bill is a bill that appropriates (gives to, sets aside for) money to specific federal government departments, agencies, and programs. The money provides funding for operations, personnel, equipment, and activities. Regular appropriations bills are passed annually, with the funding they provide covering one fiscal year. The fiscal year is the accounting period of the federal government, which runs from October 1 to September 30 of the following year.

There are three types of appropriations bills: regular appropriations bills, continuing resolutions, and supplemental appropriations bills. Regular appropriations bills are the twelve standard bills that cover the funding for the federal government for one fiscal year and that are supposed to be enacted into law by October 1. If Congress has not enacted the regular appropriations bills by the time, it can pass a continuing resolution, which continues the pre-existing appropriations at the same levels as the previous fiscal year (or with minor modifications) for a set amount of time. The third type of appropriations bills are supplemental appropriations bills, which add additional funding above and beyond what was originally appropriated at the beginning of the fiscal year. Supplemental appropriations bills can be used for things like disaster relief.

Appropriations bills are one part of a larger United States budget and spending process. They are preceded in that process by the president's budget proposal, congressional budget resolutions, and the 302(b) allocation. Article One of the United States Constitution, section 9, clause 7, states that "No money shall be drawn from the Treasury, but in Consequence of Appropriations made by Law..." This is what gives Congress the power to make these appropriations. The President, however, still has the power to veto appropriations bills.

== Jurisdiction ==
This subcommittee has jurisdiction funding for the Department of Housing and Urban Development and the Department of Transportation. It also oversees funding for the Federal Housing Administration and economic and community development programs, such as Community Development Block Grants. Specific agencies under its jurisdiction are the Federal Aviation Administration, the National Transportation Safety Board, the Surface Transportation Board, and the Washington Metropolitan Area Transit Authority.

== Members, 119th Congress ==
Majority	Minority
Cindy Hyde-Smith, Mississippi, Chair; Susan Collins, Maine; John Boozman, Arkansas; Shelley Moore Capito, West Virginia; Lindsey Graham, South Carolina (until July 11, 2026); John Hoeven, North Dakota; John Kennedy, Louisiana; Jerry Moran, Kansas; Katie Britt, Alabama; Darline Graham, South Carolina (from July 22, 2026)	Kirsten Gillibrand, New York, Ranking Member; Patty Murray, Washington; Dick Durbin, Illinois; Jack Reed, Rhode Island; Brian Schatz, Hawaii; Chris Coons, Delaware; Chris Murphy, Connecticut; Chris Van Hollen, Maryland
Ex officio

== Historical subcommittee rosters ==
=== 116th Congress ===
Majority	Minority
Susan Collins, Maine, Chairwoman; Richard Shelby, Alabama; Lamar Alexander, Tennessee; Roy Blunt, Missouri; John Boozman, Arkansas; Shelley Moore Capito, West Virginia; Lindsey Graham, South Carolina; John Hoeven, North Dakota; Steve Daines, Montana	Jack Reed, Rhode Island, Ranking Member; Patty Murray, Washington; Dick Durbin, Illinois; Dianne Feinstein, California; Chris Coons, Delaware; Brian Schatz, Hawaii; Chris Murphy, Connecticut; Joe Manchin, West Virginia
Ex officio
	Patrick Leahy, Vermont

=== 117th Congress ===
Majority	Minority
Brian Schatz, Hawaii, Chair; Jack Reed, Rhode Island; Patty Murray, Washington; Dick Durbin, Illinois; Dianne Feinstein, California; Chris Coons, Delaware; Chris Murphy, Connecticut; Joe Manchin, West Virginia; Chris Van Hollen, Maryland	Susan Collins, Maine, Ranking Member; Richard Shelby, Alabama; Roy Blunt, Missouri; John Boozman, Arkansas; Shelley Moore Capito, West Virginia; Lindsey Graham, South Carolina; John Hoeven, North Dakota; John Kennedy, Louisiana; Mike Braun, Indiana
Ex officio
Patrick Leahy, Vermont	

=== 118th Congress ===
Majority	Minority
Brian Schatz, Hawaii, Chair; Jack Reed, Rhode Island; Patty Murray, Washington; Dick Durbin, Illinois; Dianne Feinstein, California (until September 29, 2023); Chris Coons, Delaware; Chris Murphy, Connecticut; Joe Manchin, West Virginia; Chris Van Hollen, Maryland; Kyrsten Sinema, Arizona (from October 17, 2023)	Cindy Hyde-Smith, Mississippi, Ranking Member; John Boozman, Arkansas; Shelley Moore Capito, West Virginia; Lindsey Graham, South Carolina; John Hoeven, North Dakota; John Kennedy, Louisiana; Jerry Moran, Kansas; Susan Collins, Maine
Ex officio

== See also ==
- United States House Appropriations Subcommittee on Transportation, Housing and Urban Development, and Related Agencies
