= John Kennedy (Louisiana politician) =

American politician and attorney (born 1951)

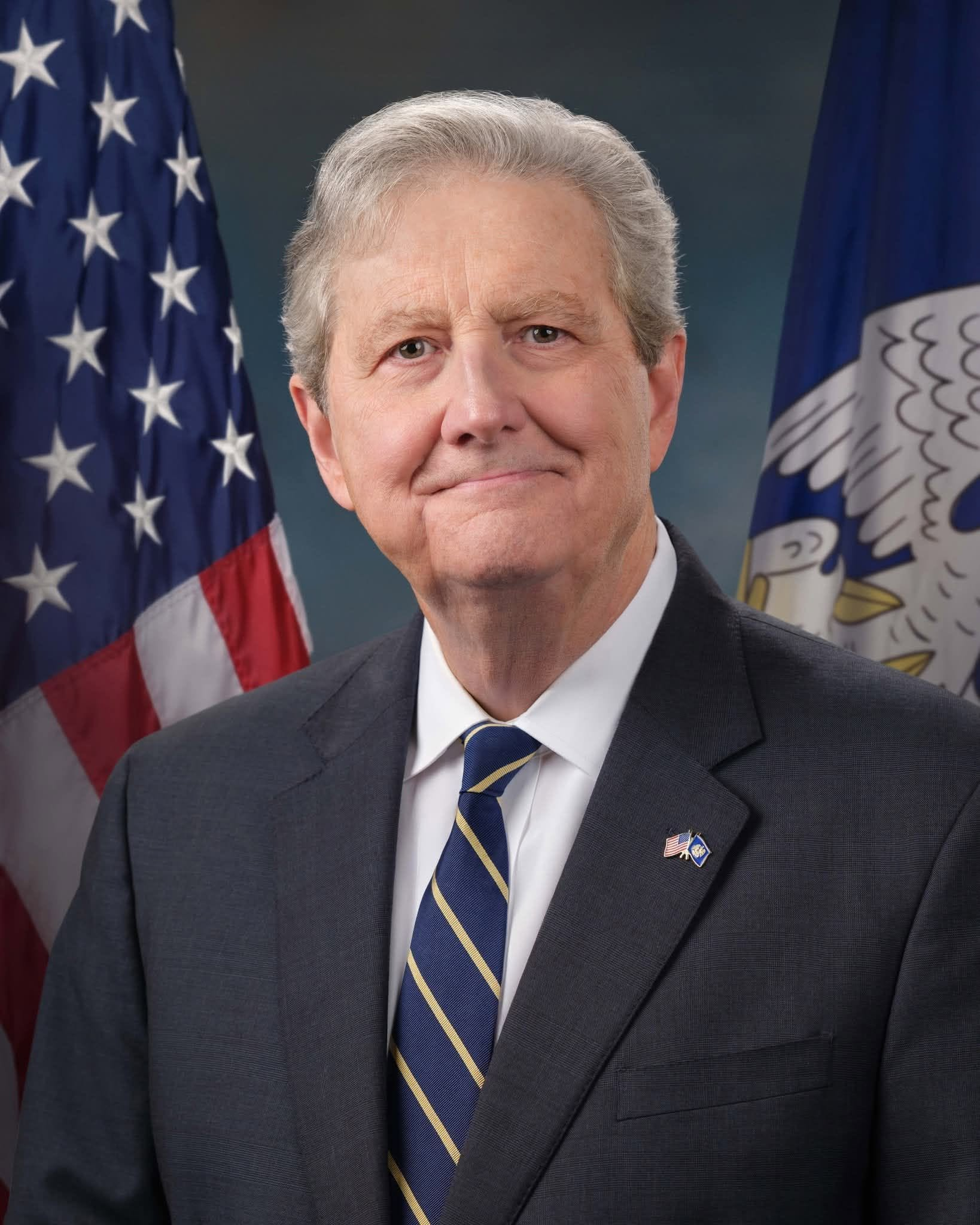
- Official portrait, 2025

United States Senator from Louisiana
- Incumbent
- Assumed office January 3, 2017 Serving with Bill Cassidy
- Preceded by: David Vitter

Treasurer of Louisiana
- In office January 10, 2000 – January 3, 2017
- Governor: Mike Foster; Kathleen Blanco; Bobby Jindal; John Bel Edwards
- Preceded by: Ken Duncan
- Succeeded by: John Schroder

Louisiana Secretary of Revenue
- In office January 8, 1996 – April 30, 1999
- Governor: Mike Foster
- Preceded by: Leon Tarver
- Succeeded by: Brett Crawford

Personal details
- Born: John Neely Kennedy; November 21, 1951 (age 75) Centreville, Mississippi, U.S.
- Party: Republican (2007–present)
- Other political affiliations: Democratic (before 2007)
- Spouse: Rebecca Stulb (m. 1990)
- Children: 1
- Education: Vanderbilt University (BA); University of Virginia (JD); Magdalen College, Oxford (BCL)
- Website: Senate website Campaign website
- Kennedy's voice Kennedy explaining his vote against the 2022 $1.7 trillion omnibus package. Recorded December 22, 2022

John Neely Kennedy (born November 21, 1951) is an American politician and attorney who has served as the junior United States senator from Louisiana since 2017. A member of the Republican Party, he served as the Louisiana State Treasurer from 2000 to 2017, as Secretary of the Louisiana Department of Revenue from 1996 to 1999, and as special counsel and then cabinet member to Governor Buddy Roemer from 1988 to 1992.

Born in Centreville, Mississippi, Kennedy graduated from Vanderbilt University and the University of Virginia School of Law, and earned an additional law degree from the University of Oxford. In 1988, Governor Buddy Roemer selected Kennedy to serve as special legal counsel and later appointed him Secretary of the Cabinet. He left Roemer's staff in 1991 to run for state attorney general as a Democrat. In 1999, he was elected state treasurer; he was reelected in 2003, 2007, 2011, and 2015. Kennedy ran for U.S. Senate in 2004 and 2008. In August 2007, he became a Republican.

In 2016, when U.S. senator David Vitter opted not to seek reelection, Kennedy ran for Senate again. He finished first in the November nonpartisan blanket primary and defeated State Public Service Commissioner Foster Campbell in the December runoff. He was sworn in on January 3, 2017. Kennedy was one of six Republican senators to object to the certification of Arizona's electors in the 2020 presidential election. In 2022, he was reelected to the Senate.

Kennedy is set to be Louisiana's senior senator when Bill Cassidy leaves office in 2027.

== Early life and career ==
Kennedy was born in Centreville, Mississippi, and raised in Zachary, Louisiana. He graduated from Zachary High School as co-valedictorian in 1969. He then attended Vanderbilt University, where he majored in philosophy, political science, and economics. He graduated in 1973 with a Bachelor of Arts, magna cum laude, and was elected president of his class and to Phi Beta Kappa.

Kennedy earned a Juris Doctor degree in 1977 from the University of Virginia School of Law. There, he was an executive editor of the Virginia Law Review and, graduating in the top ten percent of his class, was elected to the Order of the Coif. In 1979, he earned a Bachelor of Civil Law, an advanced law degree, with first class honours from Oxford University, where he was a member of Magdalen College and studied under Rupert Cross and J. H. C. Morris.

Kennedy was a partner in the New Orleans and Baton Rouge law firm Chaffe McCall from 1985 to 1987 and 1992 to 1996. He also served as an adjunct professor at Louisiana State University's Paul M. Hebert Law Center in Baton Rouge from 2002 to 2016.

== Early political career ==
=== Special Counsel to Buddy Roemer ===
In 1988, Kennedy became special counsel to Governor Buddy Roemer. In 1991, he was also appointed secretary to the governor's cabinet and served in both posts until 1992. Roemer tasked Kennedy with helping him pass two key priorities: tort and campaign finance reforms.

Roemer instructed Kennedy to draft the Louisiana Products Liability Act, a bill that aimed to set forth four clear legal theories by which manufacturers could be held liable for damage their products caused. The new code also clarified what counted as "unreasonably dangerous" to help make potential sources of liability more predictable to both businesses and buyers with claims. Roemer then tasked Kennedy with building support for passing the legislation.

As part of his advocacy, Kennedy published a law review article titled "A Primer on the Louisiana Products Liability Act". He argued that the Products Liability Act would "bring added clarity, precision and certainty to Louisiana's products liability doctrine" and "strike an equitable balance between the right of a claimant who is injured in a product-related accident to just compensation and the right of the product's manufacturer to be judged fairly." Kennedy also delivered public testimony before the Louisiana House Committee on Civil Law and Procedure in support of the bill, saying that the bill "provides for a state-of-the-art defense for manufacturers." The Louisiana legislature enacted the Louisiana Products Liability Act in 1988.

Before Roemer's time in office, Louisiana had no limits on individual campaign contributions, which allowed donors to cut massive checks to campaigns without reporting the contributions. Roemer placed Kennedy in charge of his quest to toughen campaign finance laws, including placing a $5,000 cap on individual contributions to statewide candidates.

In addition to ushering in the passage of campaign finance and product liability reforms for Roemer's administration, Kennedy led the effort to consolidate Louisiana's four boards of higher education into one. He said the policy would be "fundamental" to improving Louisiana universities' "quality and desegregation". That effort eventually came one vote short of passage.

Roemer lost his reelection bid in 1991, but ran again in 1995 with Kennedy as his campaign manager. Roemer later endorsed Kennedy's bids for Senate. Kennedy remained close to Roemer until his death in 2021 and credited the former governor for getting him involved in public service.

=== 1991 state attorney general race ===
In 1991, Kennedy ran for Louisiana attorney general to succeed the retiring William J. Guste. At 39, he was the youngest candidate in the race. In the state's jungle primary he received 288,382 votes (20%), placing third behind Ben Bagert, who received 313,143 (22%), and Richard Ieyoub, who received 447,457 (31%).

== Louisiana Secretary of Revenue (1996–1999) ==
Following his first stint in state government, Kennedy returned to private law practice until 1996. That year, he was appointed secretary of the state Department of Revenue in the cabinet of Governor Mike Foster. Despite having political differences with Kennedy during his time in Roemer's administration, Foster selected Kennedy for the position and later endorsed him for the U.S. Senate. Kennedy stepped down as secretary in April 1999 and was replaced by Brett Crawford.

=== Unclaimed Property Program ===
As secretary of revenue, Kennedy started an initiative to return unclaimed property to the people of Louisiana. At the time, nearly 500,000 people had valuable unclaimed property, such as old bank accounts, stocks, bonds, utility deposits and other lost or forgotten money that had been turned over to the state. Louisiana was one of 39 states to join an effort to return unclaimed property. Kennedy's Louisiana team hosted "Unclaimed Property Awareness Day" at the Lakeside Mall in Metairie, where shoppers claimed more than $365,000 in unclaimed property from the state. Kennedy also launched a website for Louisiana residents to collect unclaimed property online and continued to hold events throughout the state to help people find their unclaimed money. He continued the unclaimed property effort after being elected treasurer.

=== Taxpayer Bill of Rights ===
In 1998, Kennedy advocated for the passage of Act 136, a bill that established a Taxpayer's Bill of Rights. The bill guaranteed that taxpayers would be treated with respect, have access to instructions "written in plain English", receive quick responses to questions from the Department of Revenue, and receive notice if they were in violation of the tax policy, among other things.

Kennedy used the Taxpayer's Bill of Rights as a foundation to advocate for more tax code changes. In 1999, he proposed tax code changes that would protect people from prosecution for tax crimes that their spouses committed without their knowledge. He also proposed "Fair Interest" policies that halted the accrual of interest on tax liabilities held by people whom the Department of Revenue did not notify were in violation of state tax policy. Kennedy said the efforts helped ensure Louisiana residents had a tax system that was as "fair, easy, and convenient as possible", adding, "We look upon taxpayers as our customers...not our enemies."

=== Telefile ===
In 1998, Kennedy aimed to streamline the process of paying taxes by allowing Louisiana taxpayers to file returns by phone via the TeleFile program. The Department of Revenue sent 593,000 taxpayers information on how to file by calling a toll-free number. In the first year, 61,000 taxpayers filed via TeleFile in a process that took an average of eight minutes to complete. Kennedy also worked to expand electronic filing in the state by allowing professional filers to submit forms online.

=== Gaming Control Board ===
While secretary of revenue, Kennedy was also appointed to the Louisiana Gaming Control Board, which is responsible for regulating legalized gambling. He criticized riverboat casino operators for failing to enforce the 21-year age restriction.

== Treasurer of Louisiana (2000–2017) ==
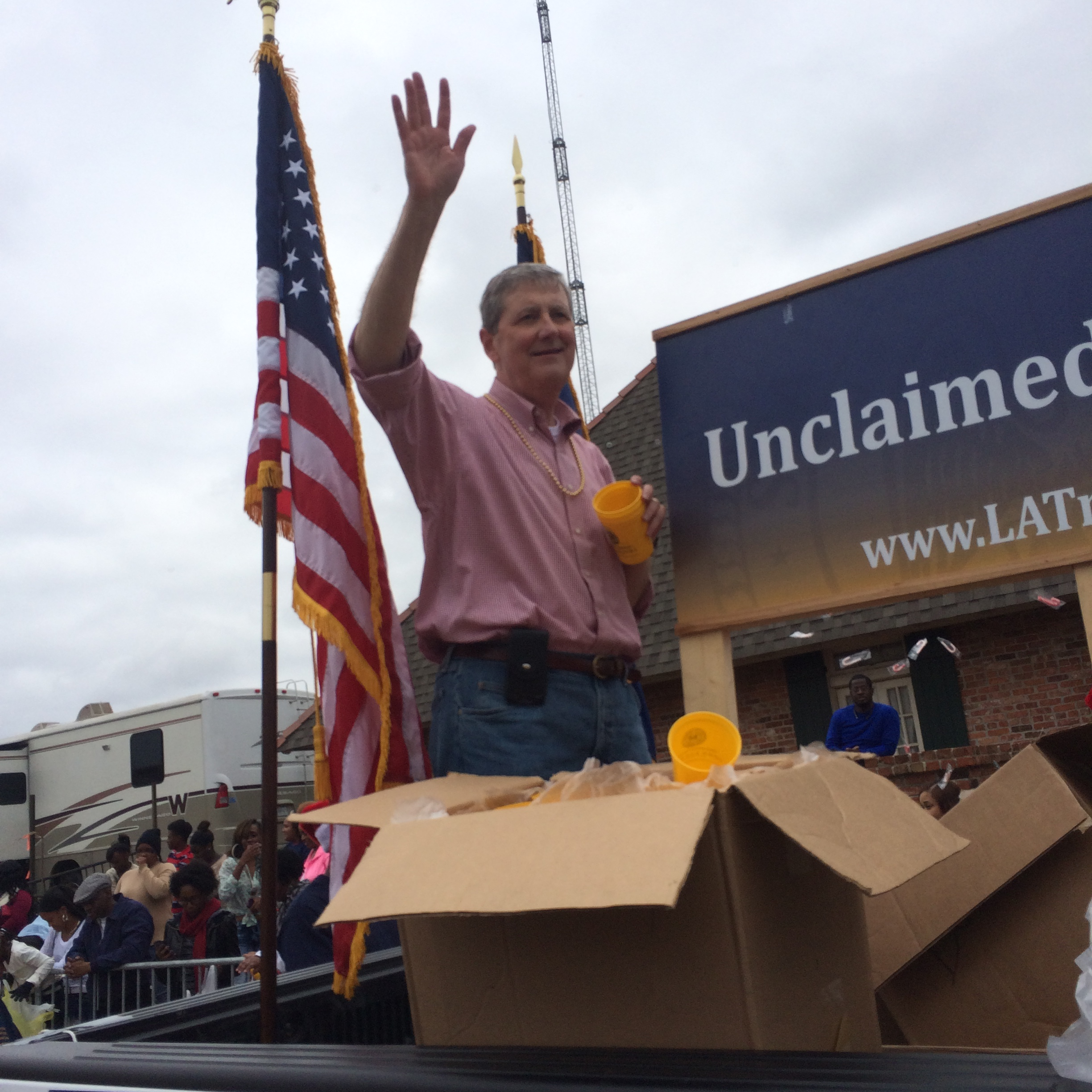
Kennedy at the Natchitoches Christmas Parade in 2014

Kennedy left the Foster administration when he was elected Louisiana State Treasurer in 1999, having unseated incumbent Ken Duncan with 55.6% of the vote, or 621,796 votes, to Duncan's 44.4%, or 497,319 votes. Kennedy was reelected treasurer without opposition in 2003, 2007 and 2011. In 2015, he defeated his sole challenger with 80% of the vote.

=== Commission on Streamlining Government ===
Kennedy served as a member of the Commission on Streamlining Government, which worked to reduce bureaucracy in Louisiana. In 2009, he urged the commission to consolidate the state's four boards of higher education into one. Kennedy argued that the state needed to cut spending, rather than raise taxes, because it already had the nation's fifth-highest business taxes. He urged the commission to cut the number of state government employees, which he said could save $800,000 per year. Kennedy also recommended that the commission review all state consulting contracts to ensure the state was getting a good deal.

Kennedy suggested limiting Medicaid patients to two nonemergency room visits per year as a cost-saving measure. He also called for the state to require that all prisoners receive a high school diploma to reduce recidivism. Kennedy often criticized the commission as "way too tentative" in its policy proposals.

=== Unclaimed property ===
After being elected treasurer, Kennedy drafted a bill to move the work of managing unclaimed property from the Department of Revenue to the state treasurer's office to allow him to continue the work he had started as secretary of revenue under Governor Foster. Kennedy led regular events to raise awareness about unclaimed property at malls and other public spaces, returning $400 million to 600,000 Louisianians. He told reporters that the state had returned money to many prominent Louisianians, including Foster, Archie Manning, and John Goodman. Under Kennedy's leadership, the treasury uncovered $45 million in unclaimed death benefits alone.

With the money that remained unclaimed, Kennedy convinced the state legislature to establish a $200 million fund to repay construction bonds that were used to build I-49. He worked with Moody's and Standard & Poor's to maintain the state's favorable bond rating throughout the project.

=== Debt refinance ===
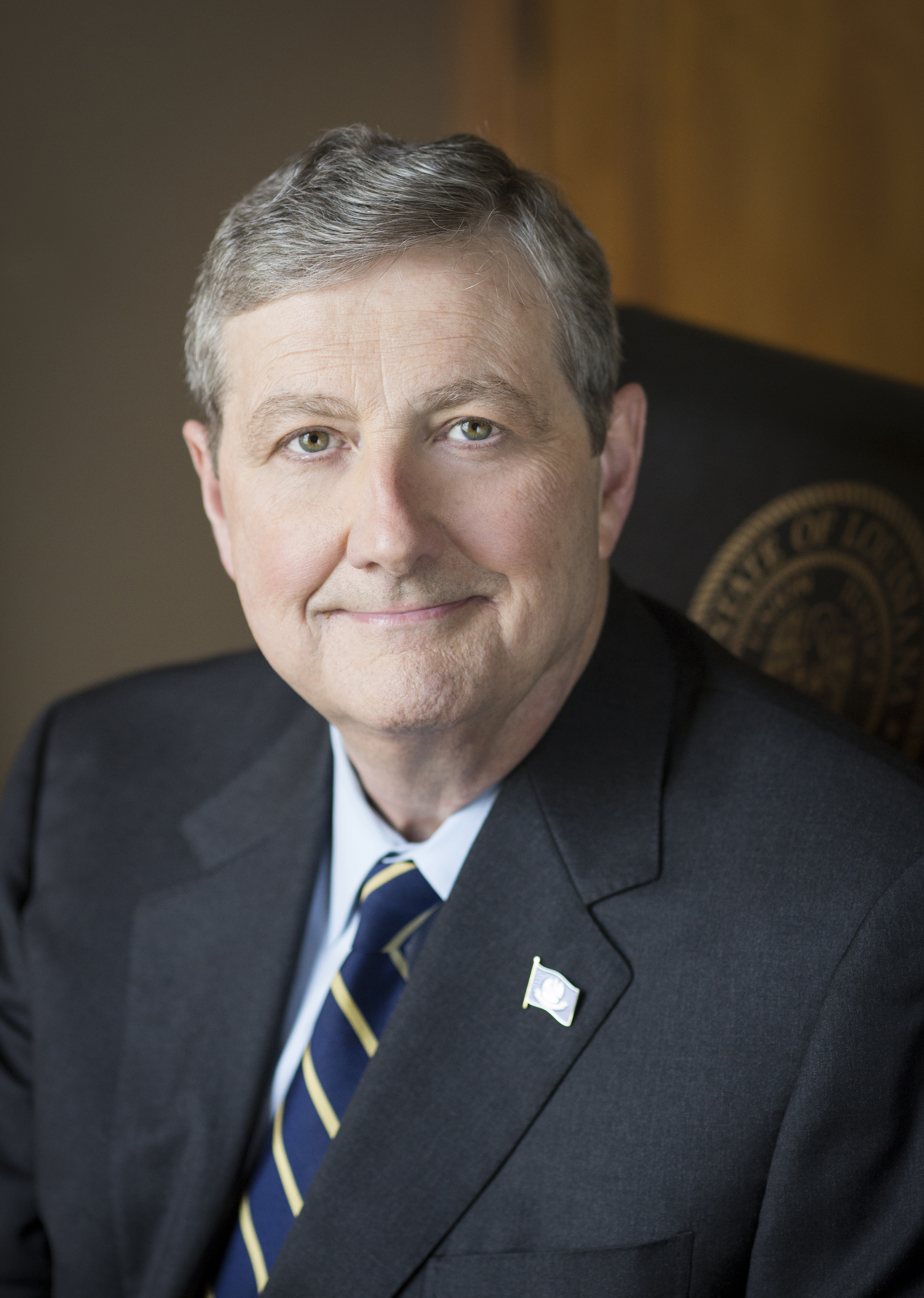
Kennedy's 2013 portrait

As treasurer, Kennedy sought to refinance portions of Louisiana's debt from Hurricanes Katrina and Rita as interest rates decreased. He worked with the state legislature and several governors' offices to negotiate each refinancing.

In 2004, Kennedy told the state legislature that he could save more than $1.4 billion by refinancing the state's debt. He noted that he had sent Governor Kathleen Blanco several letters about refinancing that went unanswered. In 2011, Kennedy announced that Lafayette and Livingston Parishes had saved $11 million by refinancing. By 2013, Kennedy said he had "refinanced virtually all of the state's debt".

In 2014, Kennedy worked to refinance $229 million in bond debt. The project faced delays because of a disagreement with Governor Bobby Jindal's office over accounting practices. Jindal's team claimed Kennedy was "unnecessarily holding up" progress on many construction projects, but Kennedy maintained that Jindal's accounting practices potentially violated federal anti-fraud laws. The two sides eventually compromised and the deal moved ahead, saving Louisiana $12 million. By the end of 2014, Kennedy had saved Louisiana a total of more than $600 million by refinancing debt.

In 2015, Kennedy saved Louisiana $109 million over 26 years by refinancing a $649 million loan that funded a highway project.

=== Anti-corruption efforts ===
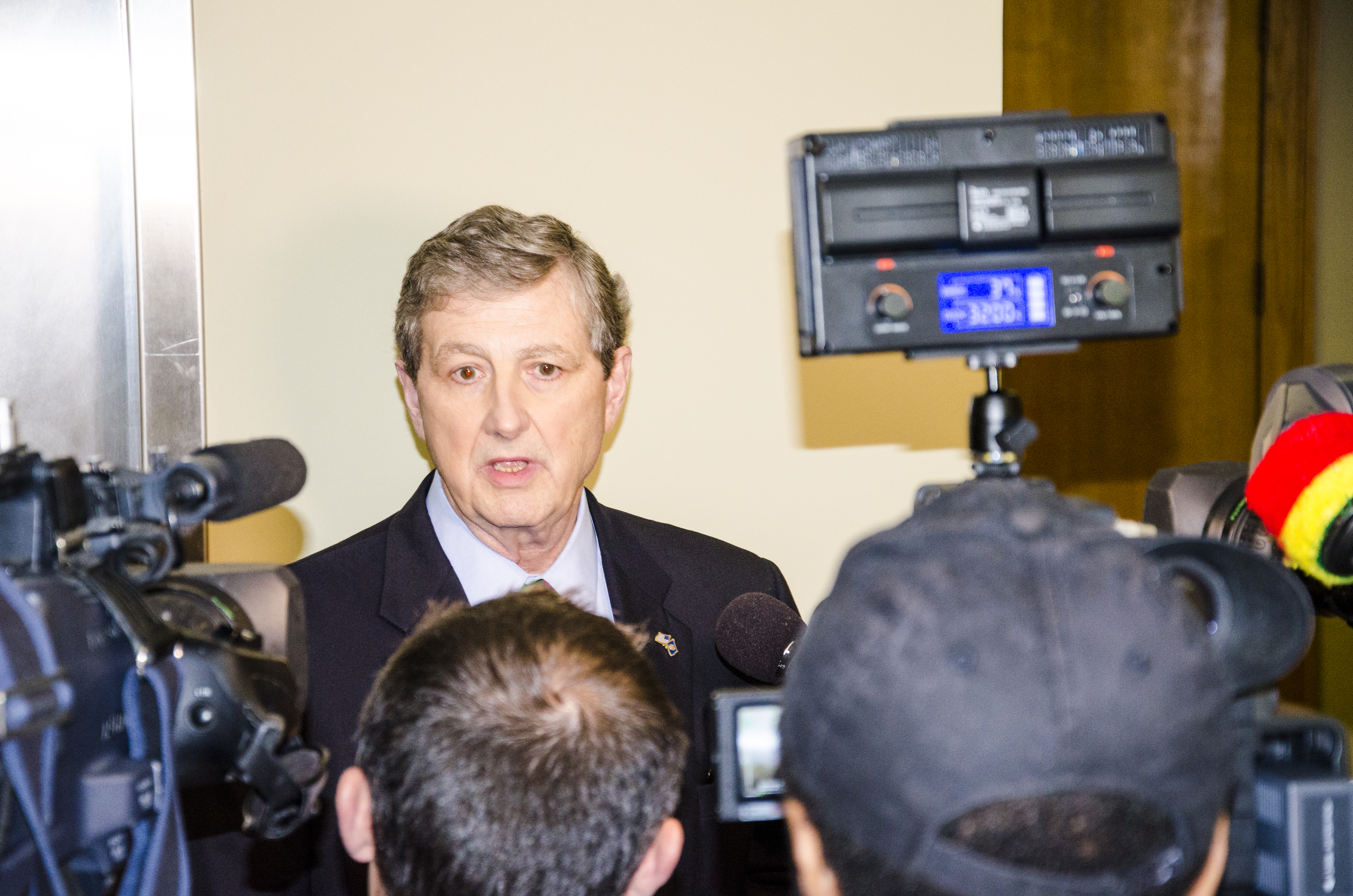
Kennedy speaking to the media, September 2014

As treasurer, Kennedy pushed for tougher ethical standards in state contracting reform. In 2007, he called for a full investigation into all contracts signed in the wake of Hurricane Katrina after media investigations revealed that one FEMA contractor allegedly engaged in profiteering by misrepresenting timesheets and hourly rates. Kennedy also urged Governor Blanco to ban family members of state officials from securing construction contracts during the rebuilding effort.

In 2013, Kennedy reported 30 Louisiana nonprofits to the legislative auditor's office after they failed to file financial reports. In 2014, he launched an investigation into Act 859, an unconstitutional state retirement bill that benefited state police chief Mike Edmonson and one other state trooper. Kennedy said he received hundreds of emails from state employees who found the legislation unfair and claimed that the state's police officer retirement fund was underwater because "for years the legislature passed special interest legislation like this to help a select few".

In 2014, Kennedy urged state prosecutors to start pressing charges against people who committed food stamp fraud. Kennedy noted that more than $1.1 million in food stamp debit cards were sent to people in jails, $107,000 was sent to ineligible felons, and $2 million was spent outside the state—implying that the funds were likely sent to nonresidents.

=== Tobacco settlement ===
In 1988, Louisiana was one of 46 states to enter into a settlement with tobacco companies over smoking-related illnesses whereby each state could choose between annual payments or a smaller lump sum. Louisiana took the annual payments. As treasurer, Kennedy structured a deal to auction off part of the annual payments in exchange for a lump sum to hedge against the possibility that the tobacco companies could go bankrupt. At the time, Kennedy said, "If your rich uncle died and left you $4.4 billion, all of it in Philip Morris stock, what would you do? I would diversify." The proceeds from that sale were invested in trust funds earmarked for education, health care, and TOPS—a higher-education scholarship program.

Kennedy opposed future sales of the debt. He argued that his early sale was only a hedge against a potential bankruptcy of the tobacco companies and should not be used as a short term fund to address immediate spending. In 2007, the Louisiana State Bond Commission voted to sell more of the settlement and Kennedy was the lone opposition vote.

In 2015, Governor Jindal announced a plan to sell the remainder of the tobacco settlement in one lump sum of $751 million to help him address budget shortfalls rather than accepting the remaining $1.2 billion in annual payments. Kennedy opposed the plan, saying that taking the lump sum would be a "bonehead move" that the legislature would not support and adding: "I've talked to a number of legislators. I think most of them would rather drink weed killer than do this." He argued that the sale would stop a one-time budget problem without addressing spending, leaving a debt bomb for future generations. The legislature sided with Kennedy, and Jindal's plan dissolved.

=== START college savings plan ===
In 1997, Louisiana launched its Student Tuition Assistance and Revenue Trust Savings Program to allow people to start a 529 plan to save for their children's education. As treasurer, Kennedy expanded five new investment options to give parents the choice of investing in the stock market in addition to the fixed returned securities options. He also put these investment options online to make it easier for parents to watch and manage their investments. During Kennedy's tenure, Louisiana's START program was ranked fifth-best in the nation.

=== Switching political parties ===
In the 2004 election, Kennedy endorsed Democratic presidential nominee John Kerry over George W. Bush.

After being courted by the Republican Party for months, Kennedy declared in a letter to his constituents that he was leaving the Democratic Party and joining the Republicans, effective August 27, 2007. In his letter, he stated that he would run again for state treasurer later that year.

=== Working with governors ===
As treasurer, Kennedy often clashed with governors and state legislators from both political parties, especially over spending and tax increases. He advocated for reducing state bureaucracy by cutting unnecessary state government jobs.

In 2006, Kennedy criticized Governor Kathleen Blanco for including more than $9 million in spending he deemed "pork". He sent Blanco a six-page document of suggested cuts she could make as line-item vetoes. Kennedy said his list was "based upon the fact that many of the entities do not appear to be government entities, the lack of information about many of the items or entities, and that many of the items should have been considered through the entire process and/or included in other appropriate places in the budget to ensure proper public scrutiny, input and accountability."

During his third term as treasurer, Kennedy devised a 24-point plan by which the state could save money. Governor Bobby Jindal said Kennedy could "streamline" his own department. Many of Kennedy's ideas were derived from the Louisiana Commission for Streamlining Government, on which he served in his official capacity as treasurer. Kennedy later accused Jindal's administration of check kiting, a controversial accounting practice whereby the governor took money from the 2014-2015 budget to cover debts from the 2013-2014 budget.

== Campaigns for U.S. Senate ==
=== 2004 ===
On February 3, 2004, Kennedy launched his first bid for the U.S. Senate to replace incumbent John Breaux, who was retiring. He ran as a Democrat in the state's jungle primary, losing to Republican David Vitter and Democrat Chris John. Vitter won the election outright.

=== 2008 ===
Kennedy ran for the Senate again in 2008, this time as a Republican. He lost to incumbent Democratic Senator Mary Landrieu, 52.1% to 45.7%.

=== 2016 ===
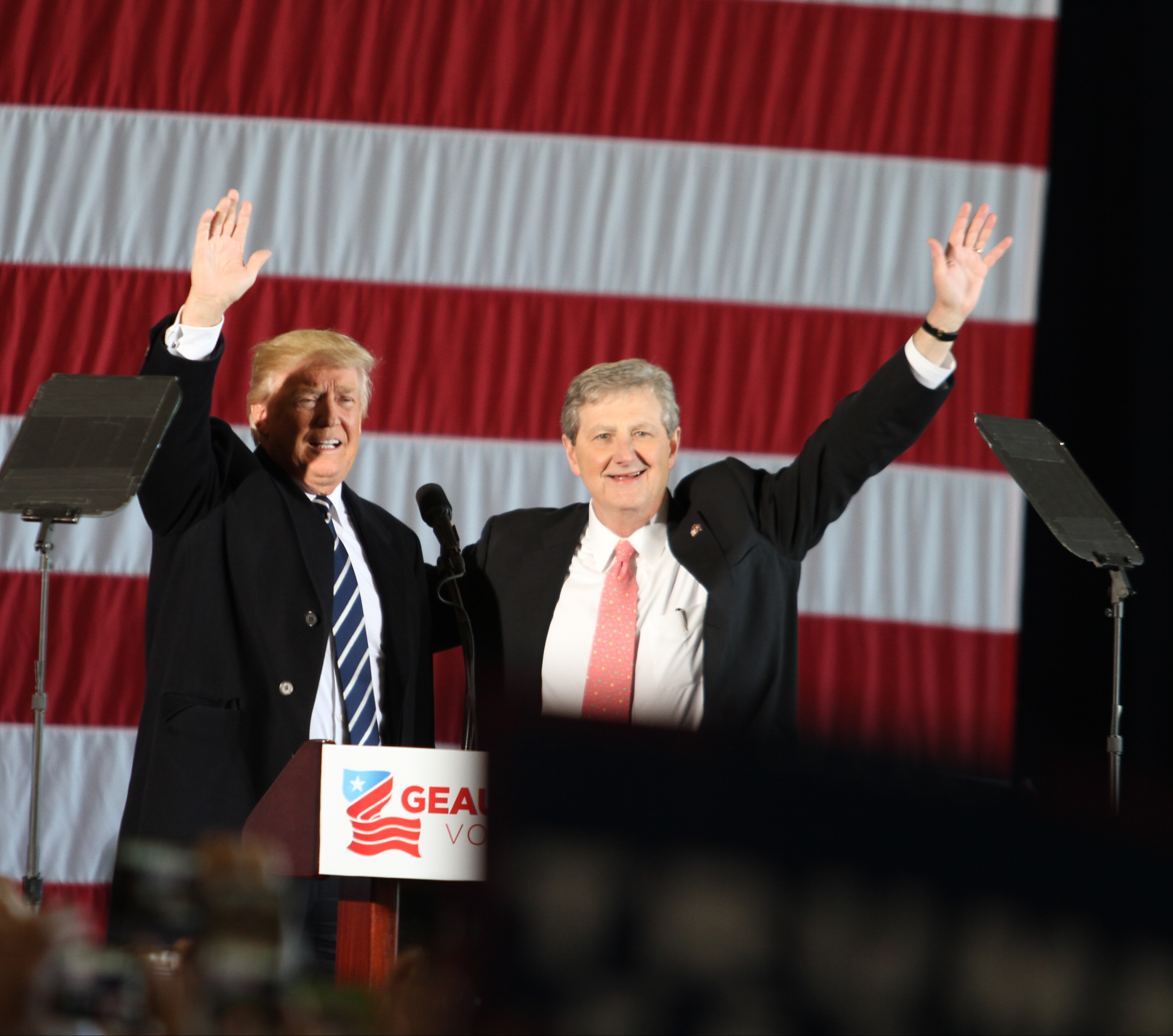
President-elect Donald Trump and Kennedy campaigning in Baton Rouge, 2016

On January 26, 2016, Kennedy launched a third bid for a Senate seat. In seeking to succeed the retiring Vitter, he faced more than 20 opponents. Vitter had announced his forthcoming retirement from the Senate in 2015 after losing a bid for governor to John Bel Edwards.

Kennedy's senatorial campaign was endorsed by the U.S. Chamber of Commerce, the National Federation of Independent Business, the NRA Political Victory Fund, the National Right to Life Committee, the American Conservative Union, Vice President-elect Mike Pence and President-elect Donald Trump. Kennedy, who had supported Vitter for governor the previous year, won the jungle primary and faced Democrat Foster Campbell in a December 10 runoff election. President-elect Donald Trump—who had received Kennedy's support in the 2016 presidential election—campaigned for Kennedy the day before the runoff. Kennedy defeated Campbell by 536,204 votes (61%) to 347,813 (39%). He lost the most-populated parishes of Orleans and East Baton Rouge, in which he had been reared, but was a runaway winner in Campbell's home parish of Bossier.

=== 2022 ===
Kennedy was reelected in 2022, defeating 12 opponents in an open primary with 62% of the vote, thus avoiding a runoff. Kennedy received the most votes in every parish except Orleans Parish.

=== 2028 ===
Kennedy has been floated as a possible presidential candidate for the Republican Party in 2028. When asked about a possible 2028 presidential run during a Politics and Eggs event for New Hampshire Institute of Politics at Saint Anselm College, Kennedy said: "I'm happy as a United States senator, plan to run for reelection. You never say never."

== U.S. Senate (2017–present) ==
=== 115th Congress (2017–2019) ===
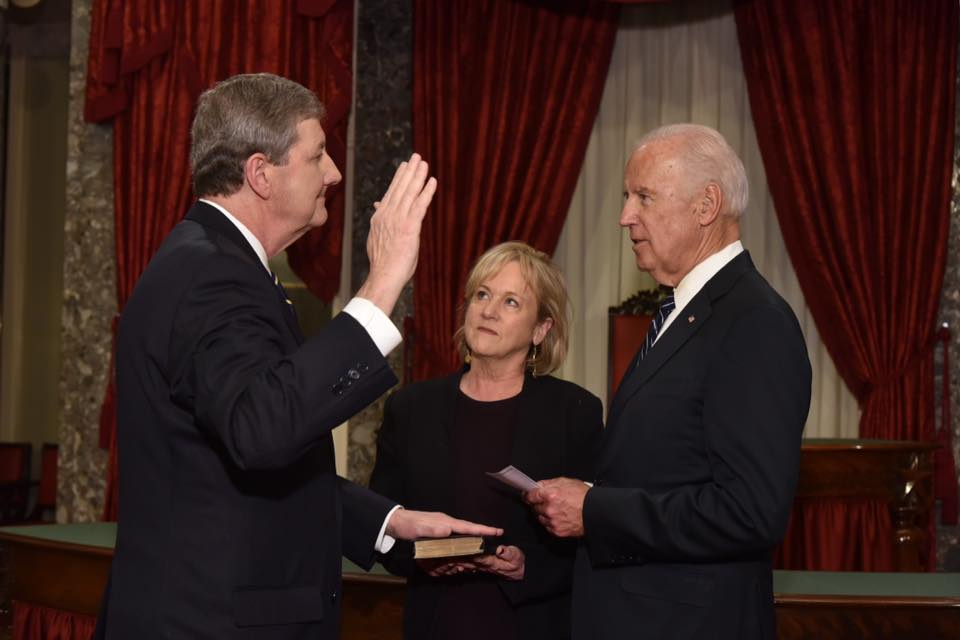
Kennedy being sworn in as Louisiana's junior U.S. senator by outgoing Vice President Joe Biden in the U.S. Capitol's Old Senate Chamber on January 3, 2017

Kennedy was sworn in as Louisiana's junior U.S. Senator on January 3, 2017. He had resigned his position as state treasurer earlier that day.

In June 2017, Kennedy "grilled" Education Secretary Betsy DeVos in a hearing before the Appropriations subcommittee on Labor, Health and Human Service, Education and Related Agencies. In the exchange, he contrasted the lack of school choice available to younger pupils in many rural areas of the country with the numerous brands of mayonnaise available at grocery stores: "Now I can go down to my overpriced Capitol Hill grocery this afternoon and choose among about six different types of mayonnaise. How come I can't do that for my kid?" Kennedy asked. The remark attracted national attention. DeVos replied that the Trump administration budget proposal would give parents and students more power and opportunity so that American education could again become "the envy of the world". Kennedy served as a volunteer substitute teacher for more than a decade in Louisiana public schools to better understand issues in the education system. He attracted comment for his manner in the Senate. A January 2018 Huffington Post article reported: "Since being elected to the Senate a year ago, Kennedy ... has made a name for himself on Capitol Hill with his wit, humor and penchant for folksy expressions―a notable feat in a place where jargon and arcane procedure tend to reign supreme".

Kennedy received widespread media attention after he crossed party lines to oppose the appointment of three of Trump's U.S. District Court judicial nominees who Kennedy believed were not qualified: Jeff Mateer, Brett Talley, and Matthew S. Petersen. The White House withdrew all three nominations. On December 13, 2017, during Petersen's confirmation hearing before the Senate Judiciary Committee, Kennedy asked Petersen about basic legal procedure, whether he knew what the Daubert standard was and what a motion in limine was. Petersen struggled to answer. Kennedy also voted against the nomination of Gregory G. Katsas to the D.C. Circuit, but Katsas was confirmed.

On April 7, 2017, Kennedy voted to confirm Neil Gorsuch to the United States Supreme Court. Kennedy participated in Gorsuch's confirmation as a member of the Judiciary Committee. During the confirmation process, Kennedy said, "Neil Gorsuch is obviously very well-qualified based on his education and background, but I want to know what's in his heart. I want to know what he thinks about past Supreme Court decisions and how the justices reached those decisions. I want to know whether he thinks personal preferences have a role in the judicial decision-making. I want to know if he knows the name of the person who cleans his office. Also, I'm rather fond of the U.S. Constitution, and I want to make sure he is, too."

On October 6, 2018, Kennedy voted to confirm Brett Kavanaugh to the Supreme Court. As a member of the Judiciary Committee, Kennedy participated in Kavanaugh's contentious nomination hearing after Christine Blasey Ford accused Kavanaugh of sexual assault. Kennedy criticized the hearing, saying, "No fair-minded American can believe that he's not qualified—he went to Yale Law School; he didn't get his law degree from Costco. He has a total command of Supreme Court precedent. I think he's a legal rock star." Kennedy broke from Republicans during the hearing to call for the FBI's investigation into Ford's allegations to be made public.

In March 2018, after a dog died in an overhead bin while flying United Airlines, Kennedy said he would file a bill to "prohibit airlines from putting animals in overhead bins" and added that officials "would face significant fines" if they did not comply. That month, he introduced the Welfare Of Our Furry Friends (WOOFF) Act, but the bill died in committee.

In July 2018, Kennedy and several other Republican members of Congress met with Russian government officials in Moscow. During the meetings, the two sides discussed election interference, upholding nuclear arms treaties, maintaining peace in Syria, and respecting Ukrainian sovereignty. The delegation was criticized for visiting the country during Fourth of July celebrations and for holding the talks just days after an incident in the United Kingdom in which a couple were poisoned by a suspected Russian nerve agent.

On October 12, 2018, the Senate voted to pass Kennedy's Rural Business Investment Program Advisers Relief Act of 2018. The bill removes compliance costs on a venture capital program aimed at stimulating business in rural America. It became law in 2019.

On December 18, 2018, Kennedy voted against the First Step Act, a criminal justice reform bill that reduced the prison sentences of some federal inmates. He said, "I voted against this bill because the most important goal of the criminal justice system for American families is justice. This bill is backwards. It favors criminals over victims. It forgets that the ultimate goal is justice. We've seen what's happened with so-called criminal justice reform in Louisiana. People are literally getting killed."

On October 5, 2018, Kennedy introduced a Small Business Administration Disaster Loan bill to stop the agency from dropping SBA loan limits from $25,000 to $14,000 to ensure businesses have funds to rebuild following natural disasters. The bill passed the Senate with unanimous consent. President Trump signed it into law on November 29, 2018.

On November 15, 2018, Kennedy introduced the National Flood Insurance Program Extension Act, a bill that amended the National Flood Insurance Act of 1968 to reauthorize the National Flood Insurance Program until June 1, 2019, to avoid a lapse in the program. The bill passed the Senate with unanimous consent and passed the House with a vote of 315–48. Trump signed the bill into law on December 21, 2018.

In 2018, Kennedy worked with Senator Joe Manchin on the Justice Against Corruption on K Street (JACK) Act. The bill was named after Jack Abramoff, a lobbyist who was convicted of fraud, corruption, and conspiracy. Kennedy said, "This idea is simple: If you have been convicted of a felony like bribery, extortion, embezzlement or tax evasion, you should have to disclose that when registering to become a lobbyist. Political leaders and businesses need to know the backgrounds of those who are trying to influence public policy." The bill passed the Senate on December 20, 2018, and was signed into law in 2019. In February 2020, JACK Act disclosures revealed that lobbyists with criminal histories collected $3.1 million.

Leading up to the 2019 election, Kennedy was mentioned as a prospective candidate for governor in the jungle primary against incumbent John Bel Edwards, but on December 3, 2018, he said he preferred to remain in the Senate and would not run for governor.

=== 116th Congress (2019–2021) ===
In March 2019, Kennedy introduced the Holding Foreign Companies Accountable Act, which Trump signed into law on December 18, 2020. The law prohibits any company from listing on an American stock exchange if it refuses to allow the Public Company Accounting Oversight Board to audit its annual private audit for three consecutive years. It also requires companies to disclose whether they are owned by a foreign government.

In 2019, Kennedy again introduced a bill to extend the National Flood Insurance Program. It extended the program through June 14, 2019, rather than lapsing on May 31. The bill passed the Senate on May 23, 2019, and was signed into law.

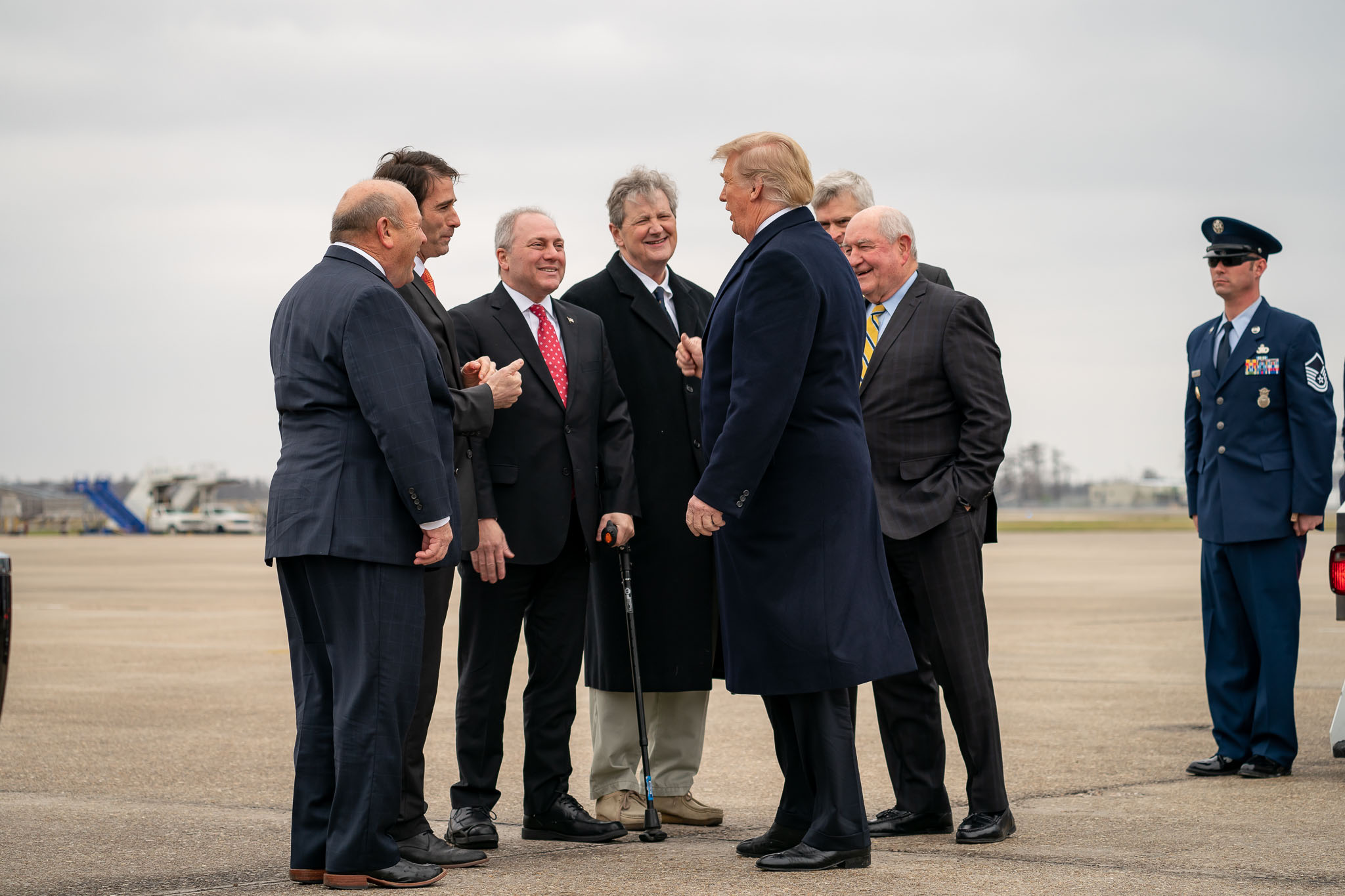
Kennedy and other congressional Republicans greeting president Trump at Louis Armstrong New Orleans International Airport, January 2019

In 2019, Kennedy called on the Treasury Department to establish a website where citizens could find out whether they had unclaimed Treasury savings bonds. He established a similar website for the state of Louisiana when he was treasurer. On October 22, 2019, the Treasury Department announced that it would launch a website for unclaimed bonds. Kennedy said, "The bond might be lost, the physical bond in the days when we used paper bonds, and the people who loaned the money to the federal government might have forgotten about the bonds. But you know who knows about the bonds? The United States Department of Treasury, because they've got the names and the addresses, and right now they've got the money—$26 billion that they are holding that belongs to the American people, and they won't give it back."

On November 25, 2019, Trump signed Kennedy's Recovery for Small Businesses After Disaster Act, a bill allowing small business disaster loans to remain at a limit of $25,000, rather than dropping to $14,000.

After Justice Ruth Bader Ginsburg's death in 2020, Kennedy supported Trump's nomination of Amy Coney Barrett to fill the Supreme Court vacancy. Kennedy voted to confirm Barrett, and said in an interview on Tucker Carlson Tonight, "you would have to be barking mad to think that she is not qualified". After her confirmation on October 26, he applauded it as a "victory for our founders".

On February 4, 2020, Kennedy voted against Trump's first impeachment.

On March 26, 2020, Kennedy voted for the first COVID-19 stimulus package, the CARES Act, saying, "This virus poses a unique health risk, and we know that poverty can also threaten lives. Understanding that, I voted today to protect the well-being of Louisianans now and into the future by investing in medical services, families, workers and businesses."

In July 2020, Kennedy voted for the second COVID-19 relief package, saying, "I'm very conservative fiscally, as I think most of you know, but people are in pain and the size of the American economy is just extraordinary. This is the largest economy in all of human history, and government just shut down, just shut it down, and a lot of people have gotten hurt, through no fault of their own, and we need to help them without wasting any money."

Kennedy helped draft the Water Resources Development Act of 2020, a bill that determines which projects the Army Corps of Engineers will build. With few options, Louisiana agreed to let the Corps build a flood protection system for the New Orleans region that meets the standards for national flood insurance. He added a provision that allowed Louisiana to renegotiate a loan agreement with the Corps for a flood protection system that saved Louisiana taxpayers $1.3 billion.

In 2020, Kennedy helped secure natural disaster aid for Louisiana after Hurricane Laura hit the state. He toured the damaged coastline near Lake Charles, Louisiana, with President Trump, and Trump later issued a major disaster declaration for the state.

In the aftermath of Hurricane Laura and Hurricane Delta, Kennedy introduced a bill to recognize the linemen who worked to help the state recover from the storms. The bill would revise the Department of Homeland Security's definition of "emergency response providers" to add utility line technicians.

After Hurricane Zeta hit Louisiana, Kennedy led the effort to get the internet restored in Louisiana after prolonged outages. He sent letters to Cox and AT&T urging them to put "more elbow grease" into restoring internet to the state and to be transparent with customers about the estimated timelines for getting service back.

On March 10, 2021, the Center for Effective Lawmaking ranked Kennedy as one of the ten most effective Republican senators of the 116th Congress, and the most effective Republican senator in the areas of commerce, education, and trade.

=== 117th Congress (2021–2023) ===
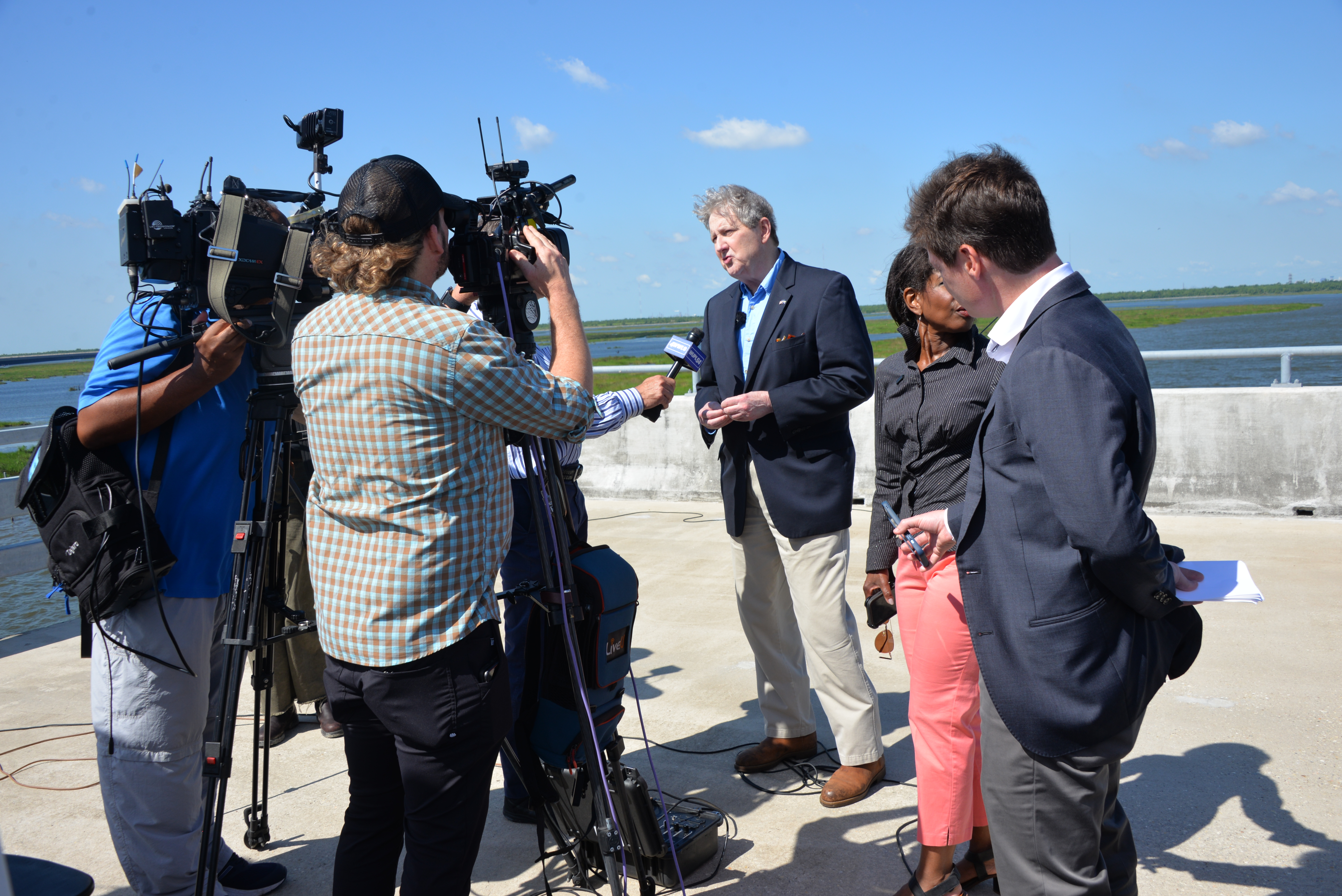
Kennedy speaking at a press conference in 2022

After the 2020 presidential election, Kennedy and 11 other Republican senators said they would object to certain states' electoral votes in the 2021 United States Electoral College vote count on January 6, 2021, unless the vote was audited. He was participating in the certification when Trump supporters stormed the United States Capitol. Kennedy called the attack "despicable and shameful" and called for the rioters "to go to jail and pay for the destruction they caused." When the Capitol was secured and Congress returned to complete the certification, he objected to the certification of Arizona's electoral votes.

On February 9, 2021, Kennedy voted against Trump's second impeachment. Kennedy said the impeachment effort was unconstitutional because Trump was no longer president. He called the impeachment process "a thinly veiled effort by the uber-elites in our country, who look down on most Americans, to denigrate further those people who chose to vote for President Trump and not vote for President Biden."

On March 6, 2021, Kennedy voted against the American Rescue Plan Act of 2021, a COVID-19 recovery package. He said he voted against it because it was "an orgy of pork", adding, "This is not a coronavirus bill, not the way it's been portrayed".

On May 28, 2021, Kennedy voted against the January 6 commission House Speaker Nancy Pelosi proposed to investigate the January 6 attack. The commission failed to gain traction, but the House later successfully established the January 6 committee as an alternative.

On June 22, 2021, the Senate passed the Accelerating Holding Foreign Companies Accountable Act, a bill by Kennedy that moves up the deadline for a bill passed in 2019 that required U.S. markets to delist any foreign company that refused to allow the Public Company Accounting Oversight Board to inspect its audits. Kennedy said, "When foreign companies flout America's security laws, they put Americans' retirement plans and savings at risk. China is bent on exploiting American investors, so we need more accountability for foreign companies using American capital, and we need it now."

On July 29, 2021, President Joe Biden signed into law the DUMP Opioids Act, Kennedy's eighth piece of legislation to become law in his first term as a U.S. senator. Kennedy has authored more bills signed into law than any first-term senator from Louisiana except Newton Blanchard.

On August 8, 2021, Kennedy voted against the Infrastructure Investment and Jobs Act, saying, "I realized pretty quickly that if you look up 'stupid stuff' in the dictionary, there's a picture of this bill. They told us it was a real infrastructure bill. It's not; only 23% of the bill is real infrastructure. The rest is Green New Deal and welfare. They told us the bill was paid for; it isn't. We're gonna have to borrow maybe up to $400 billion to pay for it. They told us there were no tax increases. There are; my state's gonna have to pay $1.3 billion in new taxes on our petrochemical industry. They told us ... the Democrats were really wary of this bill and that if we passed this bill, it would make it harder for them to pass their $5 trillion tax and spending binge reconciliation bill. Well, if that's true, how come every Democrat voted for this infrastructure bill? And finally, they told us that it's not going to add to inflation, but it will."

On September 27, 2021, Kennedy introduced the Unclaimed Savings Bond Act of 2021 to require the Treasury Department to speed the process of returning unclaimed savings bonds to the American people, continuing work he had done as state treasurer. He said the Treasury was sitting on more than $26 billion in unclaimed bonds. President Biden signed an executive order based on Kennedy's efforts.

In November 2021, while questioning Saule Omarova, the nominee for Comptroller of the Currency, Kennedy mockingly said: "I don't mean any disrespect. I don't know whether to call you professor or comrade". This came after an exchange between Omarova and Kennedy about her upbringing in the USSR and her former connections to communist groups. Senator Sherrod Brown interrupted Kennedy's line of questioning, accused him of engaging in character assassination.

On April 7, 2022, Kennedy voted against Ketanji Brown Jackson's nomination to the Supreme Court to succeed Stephen Breyer, who was retiring. At the hearing, he said that he "found Judge Jackson to be smart, well-versed in the law, and extraordinarily deft and artful in her ability to speak at length without saying anything of substance on critical questions—especially the limits of judicial power and the importance of judicial restraint", adding, "I don't agree with the judge on where, based on her opinions, she draws the limits of judicial power, and I don't think she places as great an importance as I do on judicial restraint in a Madisonian system of checks and balances and separation of powers, and, for that reason, I will be voting no."

On July 27, 2022, Kennedy voted against the Chips and Science Act, a bill regarding semiconductor production. He called the bill "a subsidy to Big Tech", adding, "These are extraordinary American companies that Congress just helped, but they're very profitable, and the supply of chips is growing now. My concern is the amount of money. For that amount, we could have doubled the R&D tax credit for every company in America."

On August 7, 2022, Kennedy voted against the Inflation Reduction Act, calling it a "massive tax-and-spending bill". While the bill was being amended, Kennedy attempted to include an amendment he drafted with Senator Raphael Warnock to cap the price of insulin at $35 per month; the amendment did not receive the 60 votes needed to be included.

In 2021, Kennedy opposed FEMA's effort to restructure its NFIP flood insurance program after changes the agency made caused insurance rates to skyrocket in Louisiana, prompting 8.5% of families to drop federal coverage. Kennedy said FEMA's Risk Rating 2.0 was "robbing Louisiana families of the flood protection they need for their homes". He has asked FEMA officials to disclose the algorithm used in Risk Rating 2.0 so it can demonstrate why rates increased 128% in Louisiana, but Millman, the firm that developed Risk Rating 2.0, and FEMA have refused to disclose the algorithm as of 2024. Kennedy introduced the Flood Insurance Pricing Transparency Act to try to force FEMA to disclose the information.

=== 118th Congress (2023–2025) ===
By late 2022, there was again speculation that Kennedy might run for governor in the 2023 election, when Edwards would be term limited, but he ended the rumors on the second day of the 118th Congress by announcing he again would prefer to stay in the Senate.

On January 25, 2023, Kennedy quizzed Biden's judicial nominee Charnelle Bjelkengren on basic questions about the Constitution of the United States, whether she could state the functions of Articles V and II, and whether she could define purposivism and the independent state legislature theory. Bjelkengren failed to answer all four questions. After the hearing, Kennedy told a local reporter at NBC News, "Some of these nominees that have been forced in the last two years have no business being anywhere near a federal bench—they don't have any business being anywhere near a park bench." Bjelkengren later withdrew her nomination.

In May 2023, Kennedy sparked a diplomatic row with Mexico after he said, "Without the people of America, Mexico, figuratively speaking, would be eating cat food out of a can and living in a tent", while asking DEA Administrator Anne Milgram why the U.S. was not asking Mexico to partner more effectively with the U.S. to stop the flow of fentanyl over the border. Kennedy introduced a bill to classify drug cartels as terrorist organizations because they traffic fentanyl, a drug that killed more than 70,000 Americans in 2022. He also introduced a bill in 2023 to increase the prison sentences for fentanyl dealers, saying, "You have to have 400 grams... to face a mandatory 10-year sentence. Four hundred grams will kill 200,000 people dead as a doornail. Shreveport, Louisiana, is home to 184,000 people. So, a dealer could [have] 400 grams—an amount that could kill every man, woman, and child in Shreveport—in order to get a mandatory 10-year sentence." Senate Democrats blocked the bill, citing concerns over incarceration rates.

In 2023, Kennedy and Senator Kyrsten Sinema introduced a bill to install a special inspector general to track the money the U.S. sends Ukraine to fight its war with Russia, like the inspector general tasked with tracking money in Afghanistan. Kennedy and Sinema said of the bill, "One of the best ways we can avoid escalation (and bring this conflict to a close) is by ensuring that the investments America has already made pay off instead of being wasted, lost or diverted." A vote to add the bill to the National Defense Authorization Act failed.

Kennedy was among the 31 Senate Republicans who voted against final passage of the Fiscal Responsibility Act of 2023.

In September 2023, Kennedy read explicit passages from All Boys Aren't Blue and Gender Queer during a Senate judiciary hearing on book banning. When he asked whether the books should be available to children, Senator Dick Durbin replied, "No one is advocating for sexually explicit content to be available in an elementary school library or a children's section of a library."

In October 2023, Kennedy negotiated the passage of a bill that protected the rights of veterans who have the Department of Veterans Affairs help them manage their financial benefits to own guns. Before the bill, the VA reported veterans who needed financial assistance to the FBI's National Instant Criminal Background Check System without due process. The bill passed as an amendment to a larger Veterans Affairs package.

Kennedy introduced a Congressional Review Act resolution of disapproval against a rule promulgated by the Consumer Financial Protection Bureau that would have required extensive disclosures of personal information by small business owners who sought loans, including information about their sexuality. The House and Senate passed the resolution, but President Biden vetoed it.

In March 2024, Kennedy had a viral exchange with professional cross-country skier Gus Schumacher. Schumacher was on a panel of experts to discuss climate change during a hearing before the Senate Budget Committee. He advocated for policies to reduce carbon dioxide emissions, but when Kennedy asked Schumacher how much carbon was in the atmosphere, he did not know.

In an April 2024 Morning Consult poll, Kennedy was rated among the top ten most popular senators.

In May 2024, Kennedy quashed the judicial nomination of U.S. Magistrate Judge Sarah Netburn by questioning her about the sexual harassment that resulted from her decision to allow an inmate who claimed to be transgender to transfer to a women's prison. Kennedy's derailment of Netburn's nomination was the first time the Democratic-led Senate Judiciary Committee rejected one of President Biden's nominees.

Kennedy introduced a bill to extend the statute of limitations for victims of sexual harassment who worked for the FDIC after an independent investigation found that the agency had a culture where harassment was commonplace.

As a member of the Senate Appropriations Committee, Kennedy has secured millions in federal funding for Louisiana, including several million-dollar FEMA grants to fund hurricane recovery efforts after Hurricane Laura in 2020. In the 2024 appropriations package, Kennedy also secured millions to improve the Boggs Lock and Dam on the J. Bennett Johnston Waterway.

On September 17, 2024, in a hearing on rising racially motivated hate crimes in the United States, Kennedy claimed that pro-Palestinian figures promoted antisemitism. He asked Maya Berry, the incumbent executive director of the Arab American Institute, about her stance on Hamas, Hezbollah, and the Iranian regime. He also asked Berry whether she still supported the UNRWA amid claims that the organization "participated" in the October 7 massacres. Berry said: "I think it's exceptionally disappointing you're looking at an Arab American witness before you and saying you support Hamas. I do not support Hamas." Kennedy repeated the same questions, and Berry responded, "The introduction of foreign policy is not how we keep Arab Americans or Jewish Americans or Muslim Americans or Black people or Asian Americans—anybody—safe. This has been regrettably a real disappointment but very much an indication of the danger to our democratic institutions that we're in now." Kennedy's concluding remark to Berry was "You should hide your head in a bag." Kennedy's words drew backlash from political figures, including Dick Durbin.

In September, Kennedy helped secure an extension of the National Flood Insurance Program before Hurricanes Helene and Milton. Without the extension, funding for the flood insurance program would have lapsed on September 30.

=== 119th Congress (2025–2027) ===
Kennedy announcing two bills preventing lawmakers from getting paid during the 2025 United States federal government shutdown on November 6, 2025

In October 2025, Kennedy published a book, How to Test Negative for Stupid: And Why Washington Never Will, which held the top spot on The New York Times Best Seller list for three weeks and remained in the top 10 for 13 weeks. The book sold nearly half a million copies by January 2026.

On November 6, 2025, Kennedy introduced two bills that would prevent members of Congress from getting paid during a government shutdown. His proposals came as the then current shutdown was on track to become the longest in U.S. history, leading to federal workers missing paychecks. On May 14, 2026, the Senate unanimously passed Kennedy's resolution to withhold pay from senators during government shutdowns. The resolution took effect after the November 2026 elections.

On August 1, 2025, Kennedy and Senator Elizabeth Warren introduced the Build Now Act, which would incentivize local governments to build more homes by requiring the Department of Housing and Urban Development to remove 10 percent of Community Development Block Grant funding from cities that fail to improve their rate of homebuilding above the national median and reallocate that money to cities whose rate of home building exceeds the national median. Kennedy said he got the idea for the legislation from Canadian politician Pierre Poilievre. The Build Now Act became part of the 21st Century ROAD to Housing Act, which became law on July 11.

Kennedy and Senator Cindy Hyde-Smith passed a Congressional Review Act resolution of disapproval to eliminate a Biden-era Bureau of Ocean Energy Management rule that required oil companies to conduct archaeological reviews of the ocean floor to identify objects, such as shipwrecks or other cultural remains. President Trump signed the resolution in March 2025, formally voiding the rule. In May 2025, Kennedy used the Congressional Review Act to eliminate a Biden-era federal rule that prohibited expedited bank mergers through the Office of the Comptroller of the Currency.

Kennedy and Senator Gary Peters introduced the Ending Improper Payments to Deceased People Act, a bill that expanded the Treasury Department's access to the Social Security Administration's full Death Master File to ensure that dead people would not continue to receive payments from the federal government. This bill made permanent the trial program established under the Stopping Improper Payments to Deceased People Act, which passed in 2020. The legislation, which became law in February 2026, is credited with preventing $99 million in payments to dead people.

=== Committee assignments ===
- Committee on Appropriations
  - Subcommittee on Agriculture, Rural Development, Food and Drug Administration, and Related Agencies
  - Subcommittee on Commerce, Justice, Science, and Related Agencies
  - Subcommittee on Energy and Water Development
  - Subcommittee on Financial Services and General Government
- Committee on Banking, Housing, and Urban Affairs
  - Subcommittee on Economic Policy
  - Subcommittee on Financial Institutions and Consumer Protection
  - Subcommittee on Housing, Transportation, and Community Development
- Committee on the Budget
- Committee on the Judiciary
  - Subcommittee on Border Security and Immigration
  - Subcommittee on Crime and Terrorism
  - Subcommittee on Privacy, Technology and the Law
  - Subcommittee on Intellectual Property
- Committee on Small Business and Entrepreneurship

=== Caucuses ===
- Senate Republican Conference
- Congressional Coalition on Adoption
- Rare Disease Caucus

== Political positions ==
A former Democrat, Kennedy has been noted for his populist anti-establishmentarian views and folksy political persona, being often categorized as a member of the Republican Party's right-wing who is simultaneously "one of the most conservative members of the Senate" but also "known to vote against expectations".

=== Judiciary ===
Kennedy is a member of the Senate Judiciary Committee. As a member, he voted to confirm Justices Neil Gorsuch, Brett Kavanaugh, and Amy Coney Barrett. He voted against the nomination of Justice Ketanji Brown Jackson.

Kennedy has defended the blue slip process for district court judges, saying that it "encourages bipartisan cooperation ... The blue slip process makes our court system fairer and stronger. And that's good for our democracy." He often asks judicial nominees basic questions about the Constitution during their confirmation process, occasionally stumping them.

Kennedy has opposed the effort to add more justices to the Supreme Court, claiming it would "delegitimize" the Court. He has said he supports judges and justices who believe in "judicial restraint", adding, "Federal judges don't make law. They don't tell us what the law ought to be. They tell us what the law is." Kennedy opposed Congress establishing ethics standards for justices. He claimed such a move would violate the Constitution and called it "a crusade to undermine the United States' Supreme Court's legitimacy and the credibility of the federal judiciary."

Kennedy's sharp questioning in the Judiciary Committee led to the eventual firing of former Department of Homeland Security Secretary Kristi Noem after he asked her why she had spent hundreds of millions of dollars on advertisements in which she prominently featured herself. Kennedy said he had spoken to President Trump about Noem's spending and that Trump was "mad as a mama wasp" when Noem claimed Trump had approved the spending.

=== Natural disasters and conservation ===
Kennedy has advocated for natural disaster aid for Louisiana to address hurricane damage as a member of the Appropriations Committee. He worked to reform the National Flood Insurance Program because he believes flood insurance is too expensive for coastal communities, including those in Louisiana. In 2023, Kennedy called on FEMA to disclose the algorithm it uses to determine flood insurance prices after premiums increased rapidly under FEMA's Risk Rating 2.0, saying, "Since millions of Louisianians depend on the NFIP to protect their homes from natural disasters, FEMA must come clean about why premiums are skyrocketing under Risk Rating 2.0. In the meantime, my bills would ensure fairer rates for the people of Louisiana."

As treasurer, Kennedy believed in investing in coastal restoration and conservation. He worked to ensure that settlement money from the BP oil spill was used for coastal protection and restoration. Kennedy also fought to protect tobacco settlement money that had been allocated toward coastal restoration after the governor proposed using the money to cover other state debts.

=== Health care ===
Kennedy supported the "skinny repeal" of the Affordable Care Act in 2017, a vote that failed. He said, "It's not a loss for the Republican Party—it's a loss for the American people. But I intend to keep my promise to the people of Louisiana, to get rid of Obamacare." Kennedy has supported capping the price of insulin. He and Senator Raphael Warnock introduced a bill to cap the price at $35.

As treasurer, Kennedy fought to keep investing tobacco settlement money in health care rather than reallocating it toward other budget shortfalls.

=== Education ===
Kennedy opposed President Biden's student loan forgiveness plan, saying, "Americans who already paid off their debt, worked through college, went to a trade school, or chose to not go to school will pay off the loans that other people incurred. On what planet is that fair?" He celebrated the Supreme Court's ruling against loan forgiveness, writing, "Biden's attempt to cancel student debt was a woke injustice: Forcing Americans who paid their debt or chose not to go to school to foot bills for [people] who haven't paid back their personal loans. SCOTUS made the right call. Hardworking Americans will be better off for it."

Kennedy supports school choice and has argued that parents should get to pick the school their child attends, especially if their district is providing a poor education. He said, "We can't seem to teach our kids how to read and write and do basic math when we've got 18 years to do it. I don't understand that... I don't care what the political cost is. I'm willing to try just about anything to improve public elementary and secondary education, including vouchers, including school choice, including charter schools."

In 2023, Kennedy encouraged the Louisiana legislature to pass HB 12, a bill that requires schools to give extra tutoring to students who cannot read at grade level by third grade. He has served as a volunteer substitute teacher in Louisiana schools for more than a decade. He told CNBC he volunteered at the schools because "It occurred to me that not many of the folks in that room really knew what public schools were like today".

=== Banking ===
Kennedy has warned against allowing Chinese investors into American markets without safeguards to prevent insider trading. He passed two bills, the Holding Foreign Companies Accountable Act and the Accelerating Holding Foreign Companies Accountable Act, to require American markets to delist foreign companies that do not allow reviews of their audits.

Kennedy criticized regulators for failing to spot the failure of Silicon Valley Bank, saying, "Where were the regulators? You couldn't have found them with a search party."

Kennedy opposed disclosure requirements from the CFPB in 2024 that would have required small business owners to disclose personal information about their sexuality, gender, and racial identity.

Kennedy called for reforms at the FDIC following reports of widespread sexual harassment at the agency. He also introduced a bill to extend the statute of limitations for victims of the abuse to come forward with their accusations.

=== Immigration and border security ===
Kennedy opposes illegal immigration and has called for stronger border security. In 2008, while serving as Louisiana treasurer, he criticized Senator Mary Landrieu for opposing legislation that would have prevented illegal immigrants from receiving Social Security benefits. In 2019, Kennedy supported Trump's effort to build a border wall and said he believed it could save taxpayers money by reducing the number of migrants on government benefits. He also called for illegal immigrants to pay fines for breaking immigration laws, saying, "If you cross the border illegally or overstay your visit to this country, then you should pay a stiff penalty." Kennedy said weak border policies have allowed fentanyl to flow into the United States, leading to thousands of overdose deaths annually. He introduced a bill to extend the prison sentences of those caught dealing fentanyl. Kennedy also introduced a bill to classify cartels south of the border as terrorist organizations.

Kennedy supports legal immigration, saying, "Legal immigration makes the country better. We are, after all, a nation of immigrants."

=== Abortion ===
Kennedy is "strongly opposed" to abortion. He supported the 2022 overturning of Roe v. Wade, saying, "today's decision to return the issue of abortion to the American people and the states corrects a legal and moral error."

=== Greenhouse emissions ===
In 2019, Kennedy introduced the American Innovation and Manufacturing Act, co-sponsored by Senator Tom Carper as an amendment to the American Energy Innovation Act. It would direct the Environmental Protection Agency to phase down production and consumption of hydrofluorocarbons over the next 15 years. Hydrofluorocarbons are potent greenhouse gases used primarily as coolants in refrigerators and air conditioning systems. The American Innovation and Manufacturing Act became law in December 2020 as part of the annual government funding bill.

=== Guns ===
Kennedy had an "A" rating in 2016 and "A+" rating in 2022 from the NRA Political Victory Fund (NRA), which endorsed him during both elections. Kennedy opposed a rule from the Bureau of Alcohol, Tobacco, and Firearms that effectively reclassified guns equipped with pistol stabilizing braces as short-barreled rifles, which would require gun owners to register the weapons with the federal government. He argued the rule harmed gun owners with disabilities who needed the braces to use handguns. He tried to pass a joint resolution of disapproval under the Congressional Review Act to block the rule, but the resolution failed by a vote of 50–49. Kennedy supports gun ownership for self-defense and often says, "I believe love is the answer. I do. But I also own a handgun, just in case."

Kennedy supports protecting due process rights for veterans who seek assistance from Veterans Affairs. He introduced a bill to prevent the VA from reporting veterans to the FBI's National Instant Criminal Background Check System without due process if they seek financial support.

=== Criminal justice ===
Kennedy opposed the First Step Act, a bipartisan criminal justice reform bill. The bill passed 87–12 on December 18, 2018. Kennedy said the bill did not do enough to protect victims of crime, saying, "This is not a criminal justice bill. It is a prisoner release bill. We should be protecting victims of crimes and not the offenders who committed the crimes." In 2023, he introduced a bill that would lower the amount of fentanyl a dealer must possess to face the mandatory minimum prison sentence.

Kennedy has criticized prosecutors for declining to prosecute some offenders. In 2023, he introduced the Prosecutors Need to Prosecute Act, which requires prosecutors to disclose when they decline to prosecute cases. It would also remove funding for prosecutors who fail to report such cases.

=== Net neutrality ===
On March 7, 2018, Kennedy introduced a bill that would "prohibit companies like Comcast and Verizon from blocking or throttling web content." He was one of three Republican senators, with Susan Collins and Lisa Murkowski, to vote with the entirety of the Democratic caucus on May 16, 2018, to overturn the FCC's repeal of net neutrality.

=== Foreign policy ===
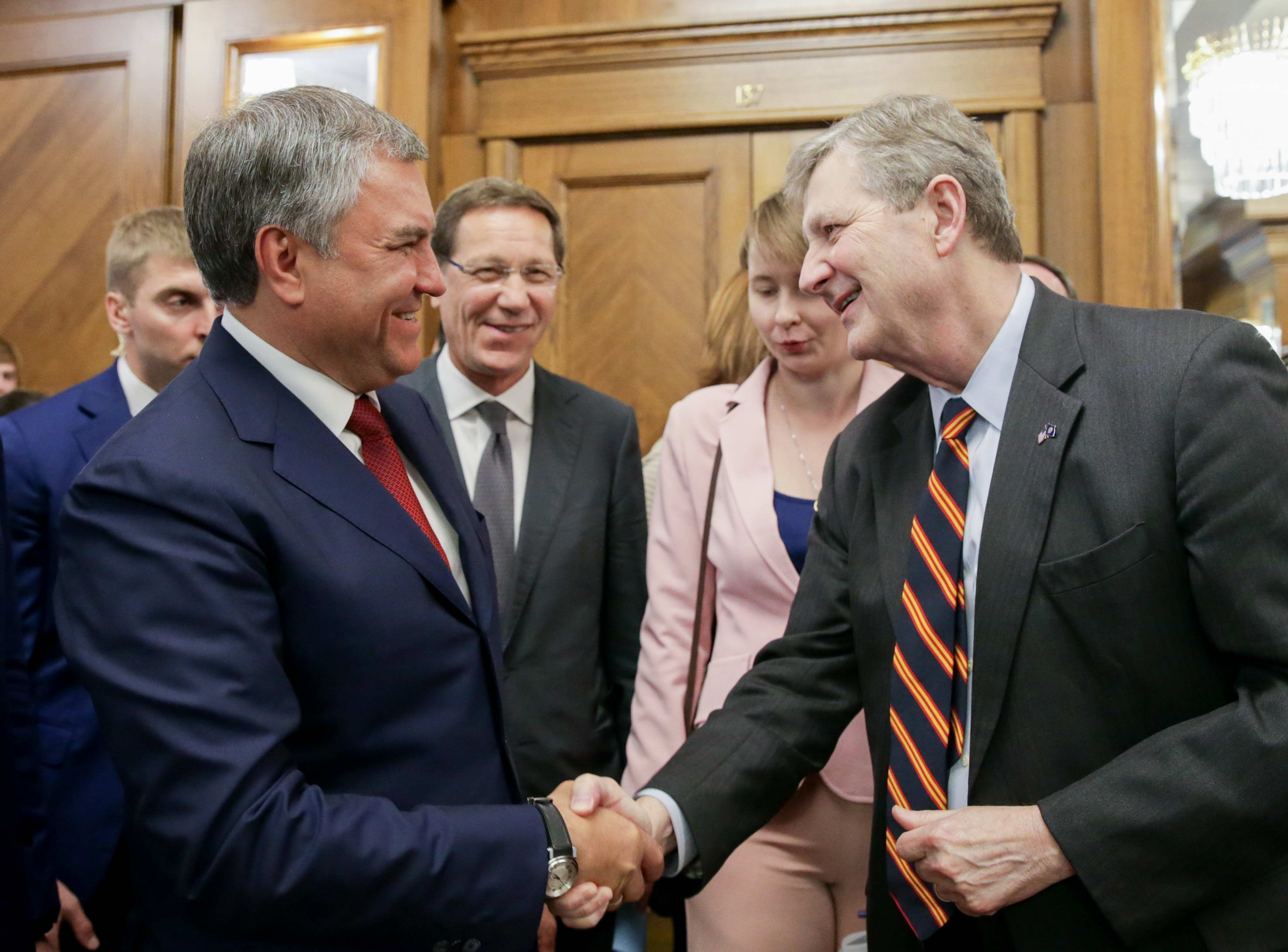
Kennedy greeting Vyacheslav Volodin in July 2018

In April 2018, Kennedy was one of eight Republican senators to sign a letter to United States Secretary of the Treasury Steve Mnuchin and acting Secretary of State John Sullivan expressing "deep concern" over a United Nations report exposing "North Korean sanctions evasion involving Russia and China" and asserting that the findings "demonstrate an elaborate and alarming military-venture between rogue, tyrannical states to avoid United States and international sanctions and inflict terror and death upon thousands of innocent people" while calling it "imperative that the United States provides a swift and appropriate response to the continued use of chemical weapons used by Syrian President Bashar al-Assad and his forces, and works to address the shortcomings in sanctions enforcement."

In January 2019, Kennedy was one of 11 Republican senators to vote to advance legislation intended to block Trump's intent to lift sanctions against three Russian companies.

Kennedy criticized Biden for his conduct of the withdrawal from Afghanistan, saying, "President Biden chose to withdraw from Afghanistan, but there's no reason it had to be so chaotic. We all saw it: The panic, the fear, the chaos, the abandonment of equipment, the scrambling to destroy unclassified documents and classified documents, thousands of Americans and our allies trapped behind Taliban lines, no plan for the refugees... I am so sorry that all of our American soldiers who fought so valiantly had to witness what we all saw, and what we saw was stunning incompetence."

Kennedy has been hawkish on China, especially when it comes to stopping Chinese companies from breaking American stock market rules. He passed two bills, the Holding Foreign Companies Accountable Act and the Accelerating Holding Foreign Companies Accountable Act, to delist any company that refuses to have its audits inspected by the Public Company Accounting Oversight Board. In October 2023, Kennedy visited China as part of a bipartisan congressional delegation led by Senate Majority Leader Chuck Schumer and met with General Secretary of the Chinese Communist Party Xi Jinping. The delegation also met Director of the Office of the Central Foreign Affairs Commission Wang Yi, Chairman of the Standing Committee of the National People's Congress Zhao Leji, and Shanghai Communist Party Secretary Chen Jining.

As Louisiana treasurer, Kennedy defended his choice to invest state money in Israeli bonds, writing, "Here's how the U.S. Secretary of State's Office sums up our nation's relationship with Israel: 'The United States was the first country to recognize Israel as a state in 1948. Since then, Israel has become, and remains, America's most reliable partner in the Middle East. Israel and the United States are bound closely by historic and cultural ties as well as by mutual interests.' That—along with Israel Bonds' solid track record—is good enough for me."

Kennedy supported sending aid to Ukraine, saying, "This is not just the fight for the people of Ukraine. It's a fight for the people of the United States of America. It's a fight for our national security." He advocated for a special inspector general to monitor the aid given to Ukraine following Russia's invasion. Kennedy expressed concern that money was being misspent, saying, "Ukraine is not without flaws. We've heard several unsettling reports of bad actors exploiting our generosity... We trust that our friends in Ukraine take corruption seriously. We must verify, too."

== Public image ==
Kennedy is known for his pronounced Southern drawl and folksy manner of speaking. He is also known for making quips during speeches and Senate hearings. However, some colleagues who knew Kennedy during his Louisiana politics days say that his speaking style is just a persona. Columnist Ed Felien wrote that Kennedy "has all the charm of a Southern gentleman and the venom of a rattlesnake."

Politico named Kennedy one of the "biggest social media stars in Congress", alongside Representative Alexandria Ocasio-Cortez, Senator Bernie Sanders, Senator Rand Paul, and Representative Brandon Gill.

He has been speculated as a potential candidate in the 2028 United States presidential election.

== Personal life ==
Kennedy and his wife, Becky, are founding members of their local Methodist church in Madisonville.

Despite sharing the first and last name of the 35th president of the United States, John F. Kennedy, he is not related to the Kennedy family of Massachusetts.

Members of Kennedy's family were slaveowners before the Civil War, and have been political and economic elites in Louisiana since the 19th century. Kennedy's great-great-great-grandfather enslaved 120 people in Catahoula and Concordia Parishes. After the Civil War, Kennedy's great-grandfather Leonidas Calhoun Kennedy inherited hundreds of acres of land in Catahoula when his mother died and turned to sharecropping to work the land.

== Electoral history ==
2004 United States Senate election in Louisiana
Party	Candidate	Votes	%	±%
Republican	David Vitter	943,014	51.03%	
Democratic	Chris John	542,150	29.34%	
Democratic	John Kennedy	275,821	14.92%	
Democratic	Arthur A. Morrell	47,222	2.56%	
Independent	Richard M. Fontanesi	15,097	0.82%	
Independent	R. A. "Skip" Galan	12,463	0.67%	
Democratic	Sam Houston Melton, Jr.	12,289	0.66%	
Majority		400,864	21.69%	
Turnout		1,848,056		
Republican gain from Democratic				

2008 United States Senate election in Louisiana
Party	Candidate	Votes	%	±%
Democratic	Mary Landrieu (incumbent)	988,298	52.11%	+0.41%
Republican	John Kennedy	867,177	45.72%	−2.58%
Libertarian	Richard Fontanesi	18,590	0.98%	n/a
Independent	Jay Patel	13,729	0.72%	n/a
Independent	Robert Stewart	8,780	0.46%	n/a
Majority		121,121	6.39%	+2.99
Turnout		1,896,574	100	
Democratic hold				

2016 Louisiana US Senate blanket primary
Party	Candidate	Votes	%
Republican	John Kennedy	482,591	25.0%
Democratic	Foster Campbell	337,833	17.5%
Republican	Charles Boustany	298,008	15.4%
Democratic	Caroline Fayard	240,917	12.5%
Republican	John Fleming	204,026	10.6%
Republican	Rob Maness	90,856	4.7%
Republican	David Duke	58,606	3.0%
Democratic	Derrick Edwards	51,774	2.7%
Democratic	Gary Landrieu	45,587	2.4%
Republican	Donald "Crawdaddy" Crawford	25,523	1.3%
Republican	Joseph Cao	21,019	1.1%
No party	Beryl Billiot	19,352	1.0%
Libertarian	Thomas Clements	11,370	0.6%
No party	Troy Hebert	9,503	0.5%
Democratic	Josh Pellerin	7,395	0.4%
Democratic	Peter Williams	6,855	0.4%
Democratic	Vinny Mendoza	4,927	0.3%
No party	Kaitlin Marone	4,108	0.2%
Libertarian	Le Roy Gillam	4,067	0.2%
Republican	Charles Eugene Marsala	3,684	0.2%
Republican	Abhay Patel	1,576	0.1%
No party	Arden Wells	1,483	0.1%
Other	Bob Lang	1,424	0.1%
Other	Gregory Taylor	1,151	0.1%
Total		1,933,635	100

2016 United States Senate election in Louisiana
Party	Candidate	Votes	%	±%
Republican	John Kennedy	536,191	60.65%	+4.09%
Democratic	Foster Campbell	347,816	39.35%	+1.68%
Total votes		884,007	100	N/A
Republican hold				

2022 United States Senate election in Louisiana
Party	Candidate	Votes	%
Republican	John Kennedy (incumbent)	851,527	61.6
Democratic	Gary Chambers	246,928	17.9
Democratic	Luke Mixon	182,877	13.2
Democratic	Syrita Steib	31,567	2.3
Republican	Devin Lance Graham	25,275	1.8
Democratic	MV "Vinny" Mendoza	11,910	0.9
Independent	Beryl Billiot	9,378	0.7
Democratic	Salvador P. Rodriguez	7,766	0.6
Independent	Bradley McMorris	5,388	0.4
Libertarian	Aaron C. Sigler	4,863	0.4
Independent	Alexander "Xan" John	2,752	0.2
Independent	W. Thomas La Fontaine Olson	1,676	0.1
Independent	Thomas Wenn	1,322	0.1
Total votes		1,383,229	100
Republican hold			

== Selected publications ==
Kennedy has written and published the following books and articles:

- "The Federal Power Commission, Job Bias, and NAACP v. FPC." Akron Law Review, vol. 10, no. 556 (January 1, 1977).
- "Assumption of the Risk, Comparative Fault and Strict Liability After Rozell." (47 Louisiana Law Review, vol. 57, no. 791 (January 1, 1987).
- "A Primer on the Louisiana Products Liability Act." Louisiana Law Review, vol. 49, no. 565 (January 1, 1989).
- The Dimension of Time in the Louisiana Products Liability Act (42 Louisiana Bar Journal (January 1, 1994)
- "Role of the Consumer Expectation Test Under Louisiana's Products Liability Tort Doctrine." Tulane Law Review, vol. 69, no. 1 (1994-1995), pp. 117–164.
- Louisiana State Constitutional Law. LSU Publications Institute (January 1, 2012)
- Kennedy, John (October 7, 2025). How to Test Negative for Stupid: And Why Washington Never Will. Broadside Books. ISBN 978-0063428164.

== See also ==
- List of American politicians who switched parties in office

Political offices
Preceded by Ken Duncan	Treasurer of Louisiana; 2000–2017	Succeeded by Ron Henson
Party political offices
Vacant Title last held by Mary Landrieu; 1991	Democratic nominee for Treasurer of Louisiana; 2003	Vacant Title next held by Derrick Edwards; 2017
Vacant Title last held by Allison Kolb; 1968	Republican nominee for Treasurer of Louisiana; 2007, 2011, 2015	Succeeded by John Schroder
Preceded by Suzanne Terrell	Republican nominee for U.S. Senator from Louisiana (Class 2); 2008	Succeeded by Bill Cassidy
Preceded by David Vitter	Republican nominee for U.S. Senator from Louisiana (Class 3); 2016, 2022	Most recent
U.S. Senate
Preceded by David Vitter	United States Senator (Class 3) from Louisiana; 2017–present Served alongside: Bill Cassidy, Julia Letlow (elect)	Incumbent
U.S. order of precedence (ceremonial)
Preceded by Maggie Hassan	Order of precedence of the United States as United States Senator	Succeeded by Todd Young
Preceded by Maggie Hassan	United States senators by seniority 60th	Succeeded by Catherine Cortez Masto
