= 1991 Louisiana gubernatorial election =

- October 19, 1991 (first round); November 16, 1991 (runoff)
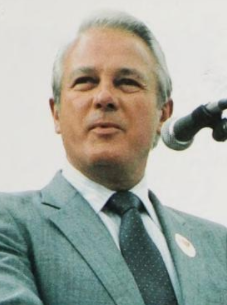

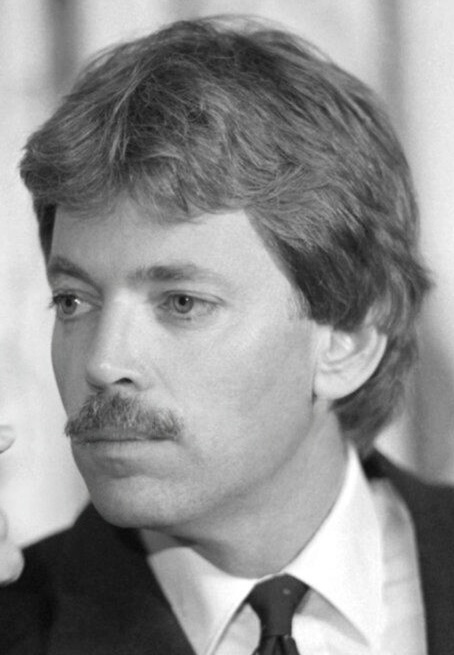

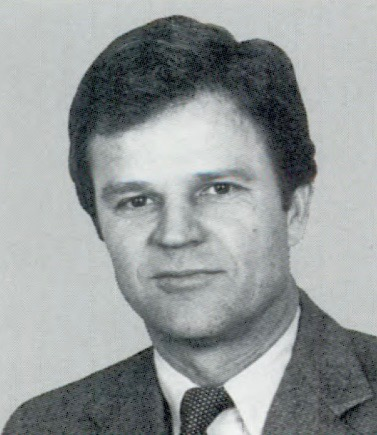

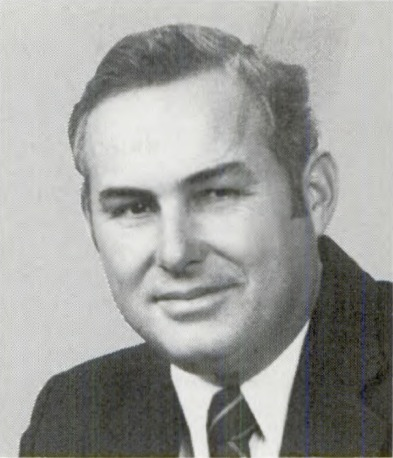
Candidate	Edwin Edwards	David Duke
Party	Democratic	Republican
First round	523,096; 33.76%	491,342; 31.71%
Runoff	1,057,031; 61.17%	671,009; 38.83%
Candidate	Buddy Roemer	Clyde C. Holloway
Party	Republican	Republican
First round	410,690; 26.51%	82,683; 5.34%
Runoff	Eliminated	Eliminated
- Edwards: 30–40% 40–50% 50–60% 60–70% 80–90% Duke: 30–40% 40–50% 50–60% 60–70% Roemer: 30–40% 40–50%
Governor before election
Buddy Roemer
Republican
Elected Governor
Edwin Edwards
Democratic

The 1991 Louisiana gubernatorial election was held in the US state on October 19 and November 16, 1991. Republican incumbent Buddy Roemer ran for re-election to a second term, but he was eliminated in the first round, finishing behind Democratic former governor Edwin Edwards and Republican state representative David Duke. The election received national and international attention for Duke's prior tenure as leader of the Ku Klux Klan and other ties to white supremacist and neo-Nazi groups.

== Background ==
=== Election procedure ===
In 1991, Louisiana elections (except for U.S. presidential elections) were conducted under a variation of the open primary system called the "jungle primary," in which candidates of all parties were listed on one ballot. Unless one candidate received a majority in the first round, a run-off election would be held between the top two candidates, who may be members of the same party.

In this election, the first round of voting was held on October 19, 1991, and the runoff was held on November 16.

=== 1987 election ===
U.S. representative Buddy Roemer was elected governor of Louisiana in 1987 as a member of the Democratic Party. He defeated Democratic incumbent Edwin Edwards. Roemer received a plurality of the vote over Edwards in the first round, and Edwards withdrew from the race prior to the run-off election. Roemer initially trailed the field in polling, but he ran a fiery anti-Edwards campaign on a populist reform platform and received strategic support from many Republicans and conservatives who considered him a stronger alternative to Edwards than Republican challenger Bob Livingston.

=== David Duke 1990 campaign ===
In the 1990 election for United States Senate, former Ku Klux Klan (KKK) leader David Duke ran an unexpectedly strong campaign, despite repudiation by leaders of the national Republican Party, who endorsed Democratic incumbent J. Bennett Johnston. Leading Republicans repudiated Duke's candidacy, citing his history as a white supremacist, and Republican candidate Ben Bagert withdrew in favor of Johnston after polls showed that his candidacy would lead to a run-off, putting Duke on the November general election ballot and harming the national Republican campaign in the 1990 elections.

On October 6, 1990, Bennett received a majority of the vote in the first round, avoiding a run-off with Duke.

== Primary election ==
=== Candidates ===
- Jim Crowley (Democratic)
- Fred Dent (Democratic)
- David Duke, state representative from Metairie and 1990 candidate for U.S. Senate (Republican)
- Edwin Edwards, former governor of Louisiana (Democratic)
- Clyde C. Holloway, U.S. representative from Forest Hill (Republican)
- Ronnie Johnson (Independent)
- Sam S. Jones (Democratic)
- Ed Karst (Independent)
- Cousin Ken Lewis (Democratic)
- Albert Powell (Democratic)
- Buddy Roemer, incumbent governor of Louisiana since 1988 (Republican) (switched from Democratic in March 1991)
- Anne Thompson (Republican)

==== Withdrew ====
- Kathleen Blanco, member of the Louisiana Public Service Commission (Democratic) (ran for re-election)

==== Declined ====
- W. Fox McKeithen, Louisiana secretary of state and son of John McKeithen (Republican) (ran for re-election)

=== Campaign ===
In March 1991, Roemer switched to the Republican Party just months before the state elections, at the apparent urging of White House chief of staff John H. Sununu. Roemer's late-term party switch dismayed both Democratic and Republican politicians and activists, scrambling the field for the 1991 gubernatorial election. Seeking the unified support of his new party, Roemer attempted to get the Louisiana Republican Party to cancel its scheduled convention to endorse a candidate for governor. When he failed, he skipped the event entirely. As expected, the convention endorsed U.S. representative Clyde C. Holloway, who had the support of anti-abortion activists.

In May 1991, Kathleen Blanco announced her candidacy, making her the first woman in forty years to launch a serious campaign for governor. Because Blanco was from Acadiana, her candidacy was expected to complicate Edward Edwards's bid for a fourth term. However, she withdrew from the race after 100 days to run for re-election. Blanco would later be elected governor in her own right in 2003.

With Blanco out and secretary of state W. Fox McKeithen declining to campaign, the field settled on Duke, Edwards, Holloway, and Roemer. Roemer was wounded by mistakes during his term as governor, while Edwards and Duke each had a passionate base of support. Roemer was also hurt by a last-minute advertising barrage by Jack Kent, the owner of Marine Shale. Marine Shale had been targeted by Roemer for environmental pollution, and Kent spent $500,000 (approximately $1,182,000 in 2025) of his own money in the closing days of the campaign to purchase anti-Roemer commercials.

James Meredith, the first black student accepted to the University of Mississippi, campaigned in support of David Duke.

=== Results ===
1991 Louisiana gubernatorial election
Party	Candidate	Votes	%
Democratic	Edwin Edwards	523,096	33.76%
Republican	David Duke	491,342	31.71%
Republican	Buddy Roemer (incumbent)	410,690	26.51%
Republican	Clyde C. Holloway	82,683	5.34%
Democratic	Sam S. Jones	11,847	0.76%
Independent	Ed Karst	9,663	0.62%
Democratic	Fred Dent	7,385	0.48%
Republican	Anne Thompson	4,118	0.27%
Democratic	Jim Crowley	4,000	0.26%
Democratic	Albert Powell	2,053	0.13%
Independent	Ronnie Johnson	1,372	0.09%
Democratic	Cousin Ken Lewis	1,006	0.06%
Total votes		1,549,255	100

== Runoff election ==
=== Candidates ===
- David Duke, state representative and 1990 candidate for U.S. Senate (Republican)
- Edwin Edwards, former governor of Louisiana (Democratic)

=== Predictions ===
Source	Rating	As of
The Cook Political Report	Toss Up	October 29, 1991

=== Campaign ===
Faced with a choice between Duke and Edwards, many Louisianans who had otherwise been critical of Edwards now looked favorably on him as an alternative. This included incumbent governor Roemer, who had run on an "Anyone but Edwards" platform in 1987. Roemer ultimately endorsed Edwards over Duke, the putative Republican candidate in the race.

The resulting runoff campaign was widely seen as one of the dirtiest and most negative campaigns in recent history. Edwards and his supporters seized on Duke's record as a white supremacist; Duke responded by claiming to be a born-again Christian who had renounced racism and antisemitism after his conversion.

As they had in 1990, nearly all national Republican Party leaders rejected Duke's candidacy. In a news conference, President George H. W. Bush condemned Duke as unfit for public office, stating:

When someone has a long record, an ugly record, of racism and bigotry, that record simply cannot be erased by the glib rhetoric of a political campaign. So I believe David Duke is an insincere charlatan. I believe he's attempting to hoodwink the voters of Louisiana. I believe he should be rejected for what he is and what he stands for.

Humorous unofficial bumper stickers were created to support Edwards over Duke, despite Edwards's negative reputation for corruption. One bumper sticker read, "Vote for the Lizard, not the Wizard", and another read, "Vote For The Crook: It's Important."

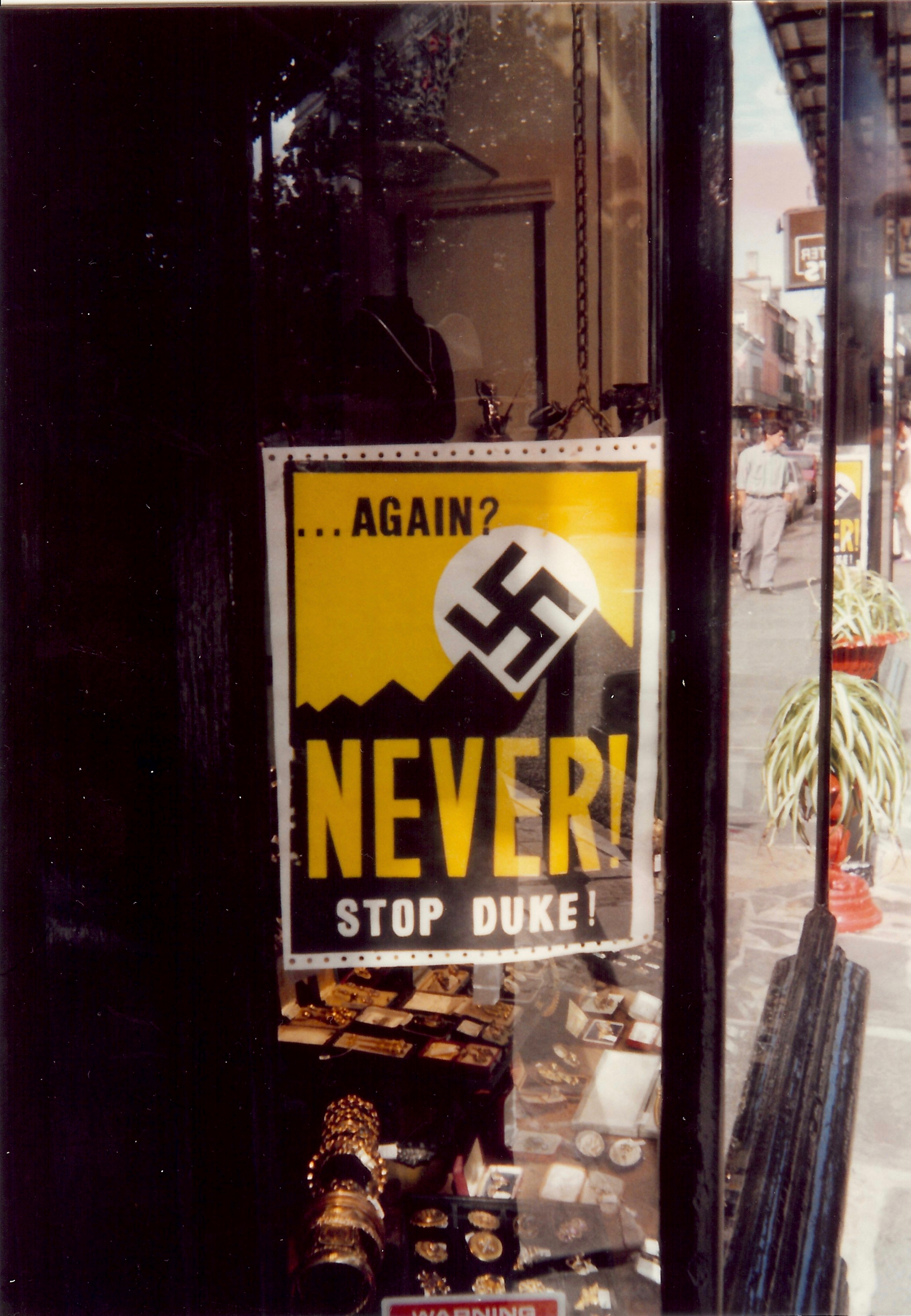
Anti-Duke poster in New Orleans.

=== Debate ===
One debate was held between the candidates, on November 6. During the debate, Norman Robinson, an African American journalist, told Duke that he was "scared" at the prospect of Duke becoming governor because of his history of "diabolical, evil, vile" comments, some of which he read to Duke, and he pressed Duke for an apology. When Duke protested that Robinson was not being fair to him, Robinson replied that he did not think Duke was being honest. The exchange received national media attention, and Jason Berry of the Los Angeles Times later called it "startling TV" and the "catalyst" for overwhelming turnout among African American voters in the run-off.

=== Results ===
1991 Louisiana gubernatorial election
Party	Candidate	Votes	%	±%
Democratic	Edwin Edwards	1,057,031	61.17%	▲27.41
Republican	David Duke	671,009	38.83	▲7.12
Total votes		1,728,040	100.00%	
Democratic gain from Republican		Swing	N/A	

==== Results by parish ====
Runoff results by parish
Parish	Edwards		Duke		Margin		Total votes cast
Parish	#	%	#	%	#	%	Total votes cast
Acadia	14,928	60.44%	9,772	39.56%	5,156	20.88%	24,700
Allen	6,171	60.46%	4,036	39.54%	2,135	20.92%	10,207
Ascension	14,792	53.48%	12,867	46.52%	1,925	6.96%	27,659
Assumption	6,488	59.67%	4,385	40.33%	2,103	19.34%	10,873
Avoyelles	9,044	53.72%	7,792	46.28%	1,252	7.44%	16,836
Beauregard	5,565	46.70%	6,351	53.30%	786	6.60%	11,916
Bienville	4,685	59.30%	3,216	40.70%	1,469	18.60%	7,901
Bossier	14,536	50.14%	14,457	49.86%	79	0.28%	28,993
Caddo	59,933	64.08%	33,591	35.92%	26,342	28.16%	93,524
Calcasieu	40,617	65.71%	21,193	34.29%	19,424	31.42%	61,810
Caldwell	2,112	37.04%	3,590	62.96%	1,478	15.92%	5,702
Cameron	2,669	64.75%	1,453	35.25%	1,216	19.50%	4,122
Catahoula	2,815	44.79%	3,470	55.21%	655	10.42%	6,285
Claiborne	4,329	57.70%	3,174	42.30%	1,155	15.40%	7,503
Concordia	4,544	47.41%	5,040	52.59%	496	5.18%	9,584
De Soto	6,607	59.11%	4,571	40.89%	2,036	18.22%	11,178
East Baton Rouge	100,138	66.41%	50,656	33.59%	49,482	32.82%	150,794
East Carroll	3,017	68.98%	1,357	31.02%	1,660	37.96%	4,374
East Feliciana	4,949	59.55%	3,362	40.45%	1,587	19.10%	8,311
Evangeline	8,947	54.50%	7,470	45.50%	1,477	9.00%	16,417
Franklin	4,410	41.65%	6,179	58.35%	1,769	16.70%	10,589
Grant	3,516	43.86%	4,500	56.14%	984	12.28%	8,016
Iberia	16,594	56.43%	12,814	43.57%	3,780	12.86%	29,408
Iberville	10,693	64.56%	5,870	35.44%	4,823	29.12%	16,563
Jackson	3,345	44.49%	4,173	55.51%	828	11.02%	7,518
Jefferson	102,261	59.30%	70,183	40.70%	32,078	18.60%	172,444
Jefferson Davis	8,581	63.79%	4,870	36.21%	3,711	27.58%	13,451
Lafayette	40,816	64.63%	22,336	35.37%	18,480	29.26%	63,152
Lafourche	21,346	59.29%	14,655	40.71%	6,691	18.58%	36,001
LaSalle	2,432	33.12%	4,910	66.88%	2,478	33.76%	7,342
Lincoln	9,382	61.22%	5,943	38.78%	3,439	22.44%	15,325
Livingston	12,152	39.58%	18,554	60.42%	6,402	20.84%	30,706
Madison	3,582	61.04%	2,286	38.96%	1,296	22.08%	5,868
Morehouse	6,517	47.30%	7,261	52.70%	744	5.60%	13,778
Natchitoches	8,870	58.24%	6,360	41.76%	2,510	16.48%	15,230
Orleans	173,744	87.02%	25,921	12.98%	147,823	74.04%	199,665
Ouachita	26,137	49.45%	26,722	50.55%	585	1.10%	52,859
Plaquemines	6,689	55.79%	5,301	44.21%	1,388	11.58%	11,990
Pointe Coupee	7,430	61.32%	4,687	38.68%	2,743	22.64%	12,117
Rapides	27,638	55.95%	21,762	44.05%	5,876	11.90%	49,400
Red River	2,674	53.34%	2,339	46.66%	335	6.68%	5,013
Richland	3,970	43.39%	5,179	56.61%	1,209	13.22%	9,149
Sabine	4,635	46.88%	5,251	53.12%	616	6.24%	9,886
St. Bernard	14,394	44.23%	18,153	55.77%	3,759	11.54%	32,547
St. Charles	12,680	61.66%	7,885	38.34%	4,795	23.32%	20,565
St. Helena	3,700	60.18%	2,448	39.82%	1,252	20.36%	6,148
St. James	8,028	66.34%	4,074	33.66%	3,954	32.68%	12,102
St. John the Baptist	11,993	64.21%	6,685	35.79%	5,308	28.42%	18,678
St. Landry	23,362	61.34%	14,725	38.66%	8,637	22.68%	38,087
St. Martin	12,726	64.20%	7,095	35.80%	5,631	28.40%	19,821
St. Mary	15,039	61.42%	9,447	38.58%	5,592	22.84%	24,486
St. Tammany	32,678	55.88%	25,800	44.12%	6,878	11.76%	58,478
Tangipahoa	18,779	53.28%	16,469	46.72%	2,310	6.56%	35,248
Tensas	1,993	58.84%	1,394	41.16%	599	17.68%	3,387
Terrebonne	19,799	59.17%	13,662	40.83%	6,137	18.34%	33,461
Union	4,029	40.09%	6,020	59.91%	1,991	19.82%	10,049
Vermillion	14,477	64.75%	7,882	35.25%	6,595	29.50%	22,359
Vernon	6,676	49.33%	6,856	50.67%	180	1.31%	13,532
Washington	9,157	46.40%	10,577	53.60%	1,420	7.20%	19,734
Webster	9,024	51.77%	8,406	48.23%	618	3.54%	17,430
West Baton Rouge	6,016	59.52%	4,092	40.48%	1,024	19.04%	10,108
West Carroll	1,625	31.12%	3,596	68.88%	1,971	37.76%	5,221
West Feliciana	2,896	64.47%	1,596	35.53%	1,300	28.94%	4,492
Winn	3,660	46.05%	4,288	53.95%	628	7.90%	7,948
Totals	1,057,031	61.17%	671,009	38.83%	386,022	22.34%	1,728,040

== Analysis ==
Edwards's landslide victory was attributed to the almost-unanimous support he received from African American voters, who also turned out at a rate of 80 percent. He also won 75 percent of voters who had voted for Roemer in the first round, 63 percent of female voters, 59 percent of male voters, and 66 percent of voters with annual incomes above $75,000. By contrast, Duke received support primarily from lower and lower-middle income white households, including 56 percent of white voters with family incomes under $15,000, 63 percent of those with incomes between $15,000 and $29,999, and 60 percent of those with incomes between $30,000 and $49,999.

== See also ==
- 2002 French presidential election, where opponents of white nationalist candidate Jean-Marie Le Pen used the slogan "Vote for the Crook, not the Fascist"
- 2016 Peruvian presidential election, where opponents of Fujimorism united behind Keiko Fujimori's centre-right adversary in the second round
- 2026 Portuguese presidential election, where opponents of right-wing populist André Ventura united behind his socialist adversary

== Sources ==
- First gubernatorial debate
- Second gubernatorial debate
- Third gubernatorial debate
- Louisiana Secretary of State Elections Division. Official Election Results Database
- Statewide primary results, October 19, 1991
- Primary results by parish: Governor, October 19, 1991
- Statewide runoff results, November 16, 1991
- Runoff results by parish: Governor, November 16, 1991
- WWL-TV (New Orleans) coverage of runoff results
- WDSU-TV (New Orleans) Coverage of Runoff Results (Via C-SPAN)
