= 1991 Louisiana Attorney General election =

- October 19, 1991 (first round); November 16, 1991 (runoff)

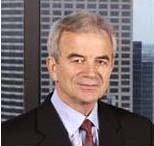

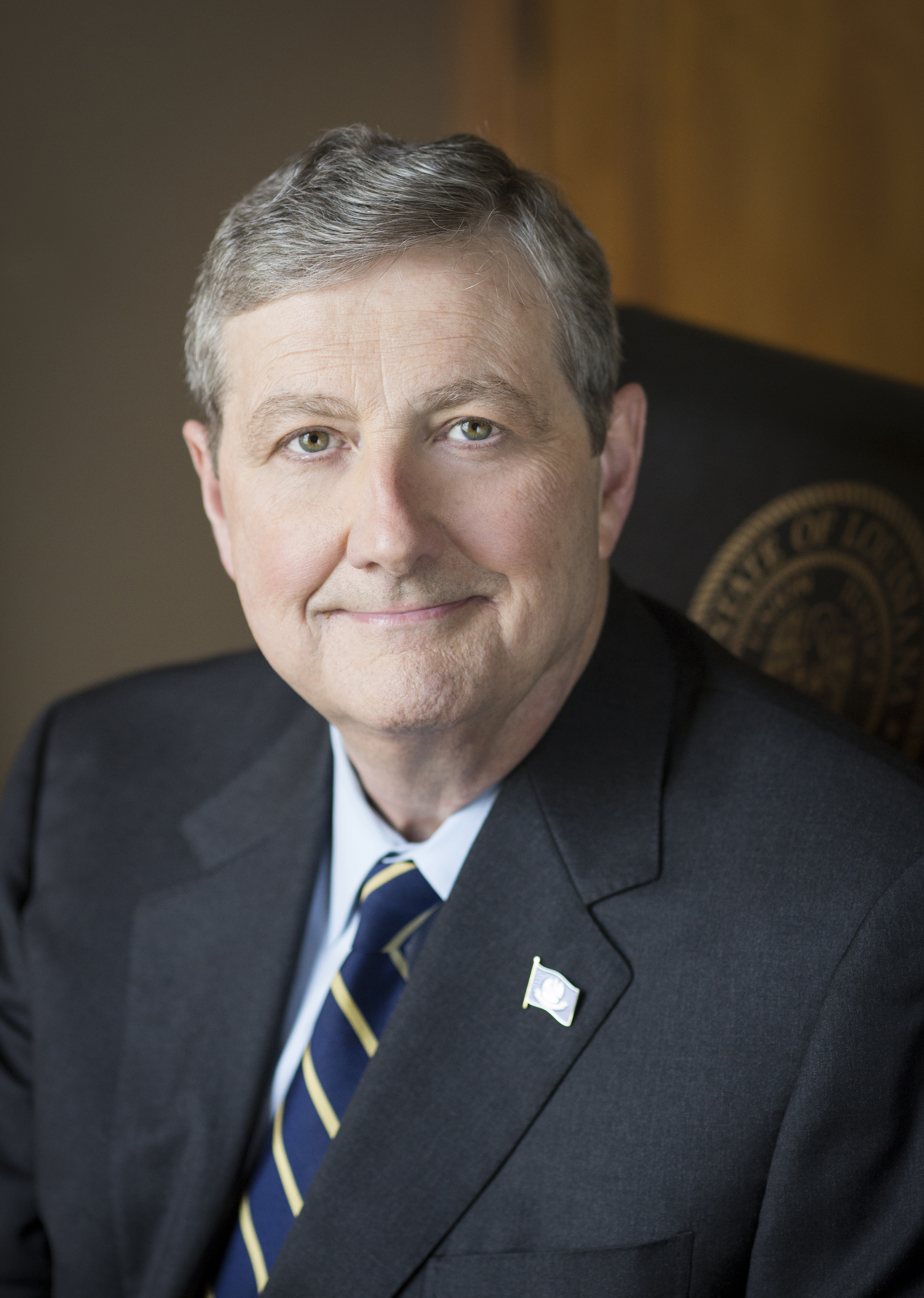

Nominee	Richard Ieyoub	Ben Bagert	John Kennedy
Party	Democratic	Republican	Democratic
First round	447,423; 31.48%	312,968; 22.02%	288,104; 20.27%
Runoff	1,147,592; 68.91%	517,660; 31.09%	Eliminated
Nominee	Winston Riddick	James A. McPherson
Party	Democratic	Republican
First round	224,200; 15.78%	124,341; 8.75%
Runoff	Eliminated	Eliminated
- Ieyoub: 20–30% 30–40% 40–50% 50–60% 60–70% 70–80% 80–90% Bagert: 20–30% 30–40% Kennedy: 20–30% 30–40%
Attorney General before election
William J. Guste
Democratic
Elected Attorney General
Richard Ieyoub
Democratic

The 1991 Louisiana Attorney General election was held on November 16, 1991, to elect the Louisiana Attorney General. The jungle primary was held on October 19, 1991.

Democratic incumbent William J. Guste chose to retire rather than seek a sixth term. Democratic attorney Richard Ieyoub and Republican Louisiana State Senator Ben Bagert were the top two vote getters in the jungle primary, defeating a variety of candidates, including future Senator John Kennedy, and advancing to a runoff.

Ieyoub easily won the runoff election, defeating Bagert with 68.91% of the vote and winning every single parish in the state.

== Jungle primary ==
=== Candidates ===
- Ben Bagert, Louisiana State Senator (1984–1992)
- Richard Ieyoub, attorney
- John Kennedy, Special Counsel to the Governor of Louisiana (1988–1992), and Secretary to the Governor's cabinet (1991–1992)
- James A. McPherson, Chairman of the David Duke for Governor 1991 campaign
- Kai David Midboe, attorney
- Winston Riddick, attorney

=== Results ===
1991 Louisiana Attorney General jungle primary election results
Party	Candidate	Votes	%
Democratic	Richard Ieyoub	447,423	31.48%
Republican	Ben Bagert	312,968	22.02%
Democratic	John Kennedy	288,104	20.27%
Democratic	Winston Riddick	224,200	15.78%
Republican	James A. McPherson	124,341	8.75%
Republican	Kai David Midboe	24,118	1.70%
Total votes		1,291,869	100.00%

== Runoff ==
=== Candidates ===
- Ben Bagert, Louisiana State Senator (1984–1992) (Republican)
- Richard Ieyoub, attorney (Democratic)

=== Results ===
1991 Louisiana Attorney General election results
Party	Candidate	Votes	%
Democratic	Richard Ieyoub	1,147,592	68.91%
Republican	Ben Bagert	517,660	31.09%
Total votes		1,665,252	100.00%
Democratic hold			
