= 1990 United States Senate election in Louisiana =

- October 6, 1990
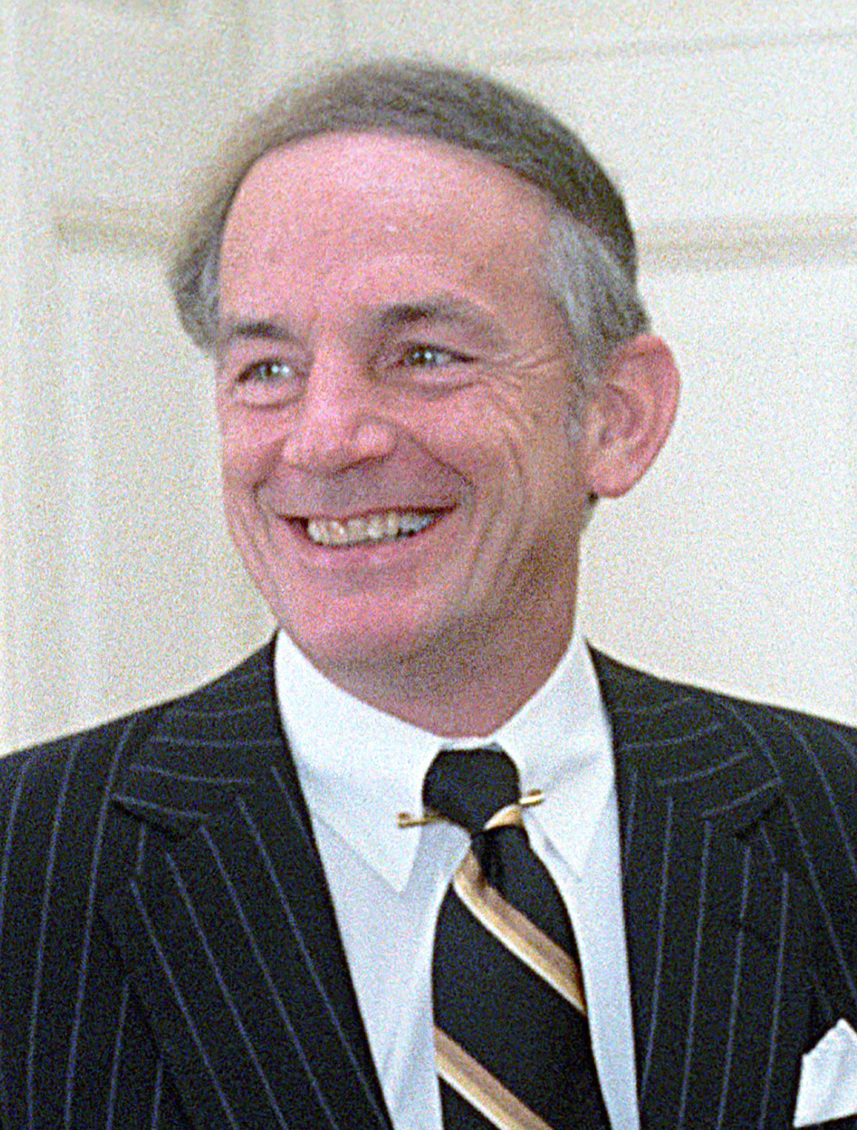

Nominee	J. Bennett Johnston	David Duke
Party	Democratic	Republican
Popular vote	753,198	607,051
Percentage	53.95%	43.48%
- Parish results Johnston: 40–50% 50–60% 60–70% 70–80% Duke: 40–50% 50–60% 60–70%
U.S. senator before election
J. Bennett Johnston
Democratic
Elected U.S. Senator
J. Bennett Johnston
Democratic

The 1990 United States Senate election in Louisiana was held on October 6, 1990. In a nonpartisan blanket primary, incumbent Democrat J. Bennett Johnston won reelection to a fourth term, avoiding a runoff on November 6, 1990, by receiving 54% of the vote. Former Ku Klux Klan leader David Duke placed second, as the leading Republican challenger.

The involvement of Duke introduced unusual party dynamics to the race. Weeks before the election, several nationally prominent Republicans endorsed Johnston, and trailing Republican challenger Ben Bagert dropped out, saying that he would "reluctantly" vote for the leading Democratic candidate, hoping to avoid a run-off with Duke as the sole Republican.

== Candidates ==
=== Democratic ===
- J. Bennett Johnston, incumbent U.S. Senator
- Nick Joseph Accardo
- Larry Crowe

=== Republican ===
==== Declared ====
- David Duke, State Representative and former Grand Wizard of the Ku Klux Klan

==== Withdrew ====
- Ben Bagert, State Senator

== Campaign ==
This election was viewed at the onset as potentially competitive, as incumbent U.S. Senator Johnston was viewed as vulnerable in light of Louisiana's economic troubles at the time and Johnston's voting record viewed by Republicans as too liberal. The Republican Party leadership endorsed the candidacy of State Senator Ben Bagert, who was picked over Secretary of State W. Fox McKeithen, State Representative Quentin Dastugue and State Representative David Duke. David Duke, however, continued his candidacy and slowly overtook Bagert in attention and in the polls. Duke attracted national attention to the race due to his involvement with white supremacist groups and his appeals to white resentment over affirmative-action programs. With Bagert failing to gain traction, the National Republican Senatorial Committee tried to recruit former Governor David Treen to enter the race. When Treen passed, the effort turned from supporting Bagert to stopping Duke.

As the election drew near, polls showed Johnston firmly in first place, with Duke in second place and Bagert trailing far behind at third. National Republicans grew fearful that Bagert's candidacy would only serve to force a runoff and that a potential runoff election with Duke being the de facto Republican nominee would hurt the national brand. On October 4, eight Republican U.S. Senators instead endorsed Johnston, with U.S. Senator John Danforth saying at the press conference that "all of us would be embarrassed and mortified to have to serve in the United States Senate with David Duke masquerading as a Republican." Bagert dropped out of the race the next day, announcing that "it became more and more apparent, that instead of forcing a runoff between myself and Bennett Johnston, I might very well be forcing a runoff between somebody else and Bennett Johnston." He announced he would "reluctantly" vote for Johnston. Bagert's name remained on the ballot, but under state law his votes could not be counted as part of the official tally. After Bagert dropped out, HUD Secretary Jack Kemp endorsed Johnston, saying "there's no place in the Republican Party for someone who has practiced and practices racism, bigotry and anti-Semitism."

=== Endorsements ===
J. Bennett Johnston

Republicans

- Jack Kemp, United States Secretary of Housing and Urban Development
- Rudy Boschwitz, United States Senator (R-MN)
- William Cohen, United States Senator (R-ME)
- John Danforth, United States Senator (R-MO)
- David Durenberger, United States Senator (R-MN)
- Nancy Landon Kassebaum, United States Senator (R-KS)
- Frank Murkowski, United States Senator (R-AK)
- Warren Rudman, United States Senator (R-NH)
- Ted Stevens, United States Senator (R-AK)
- Ben Bagert, Louisiana State Senator (R) (only tactically, to keep David Duke out of office)

== Results ==
United States Senate election, 1990
Party	Candidate	Votes	%
Democratic	J. Bennett Johnston (incumbent)	753,198	53.95%
Republican	David Duke	607,091	43.48%
Democratic	Nick Joseph Accardo	21,578	1.55%
Democratic	Larry Crowe	14,345	1.03%
Majority		146,107	10.47%
Total votes		1,396,212	100%
Democratic hold			

== Aftermath ==
Johnston would retire at the end of this term, succeeded by fellow Democrat Mary Landrieu. Duke would run in that election as well, but would not make the runoff.

Duke would mount a campaign for governor in 1991. He again became the most-supported Republican on the primary ballot, eliminating incumbent Republican governor Buddy Roemer and Republican congressman Clyde C. Holloway. Duke would be defeated in the runoff by former governor Edwin Edwards, a Democrat. As in the Senate election, Duke was denounced by mainstream Republicans, including President Bush.

== See also ==
- 1990 United States Senate elections
