= 1999 Louisiana State Treasurer election =

- October 23, 1999
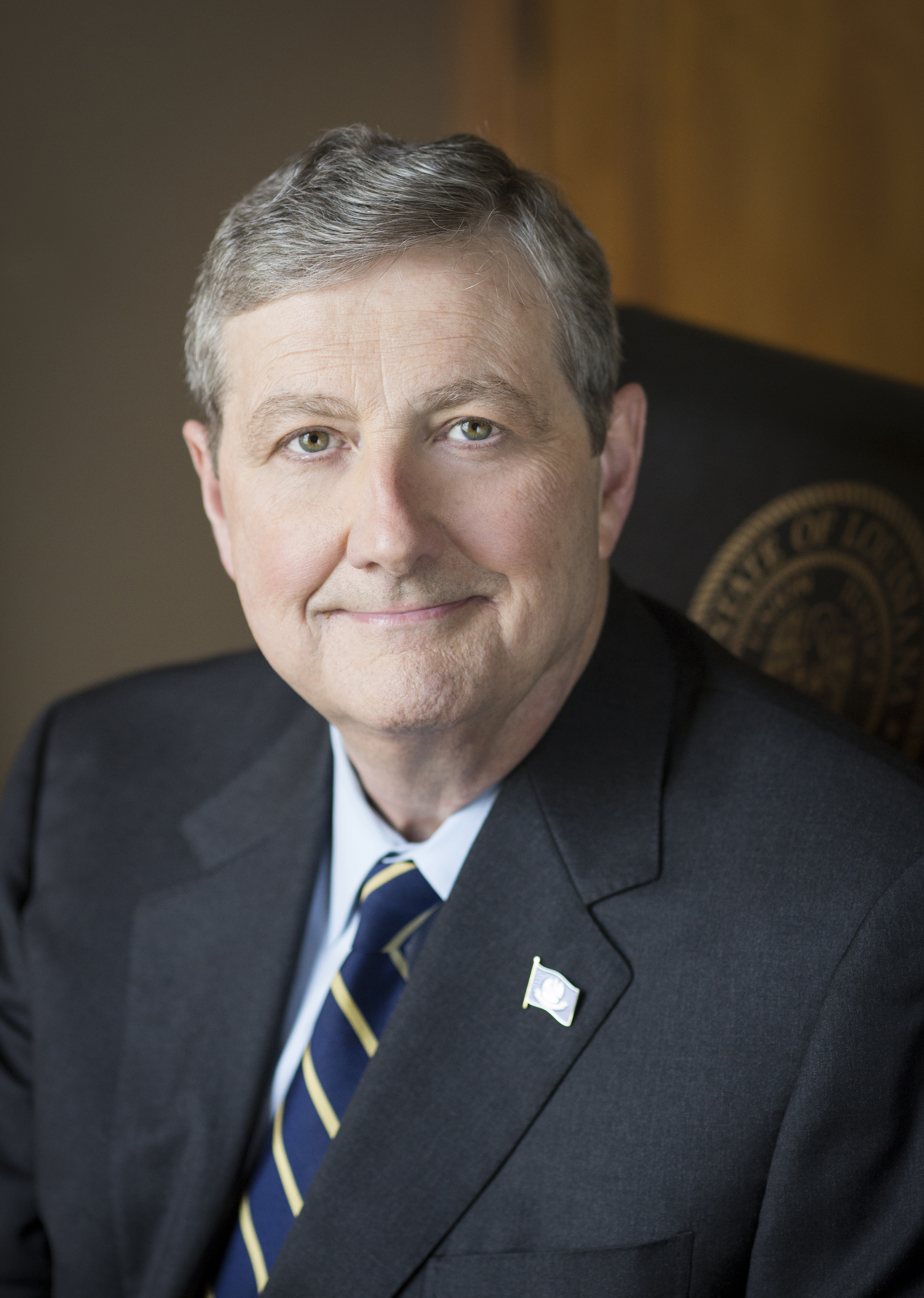

Nominee	John Kennedy	Ken Duncan
Party	Democratic	Democratic
Popular vote	621,796	497,319
Percentage	55.56%	44.44%
- Parish results Kennedy: 50–60% 60–70% Duncan: 50–60%
State Treasurer before election
Ken Duncan
Democratic
Elected State Treasurer
John Kennedy
Democratic

The 1999 Louisiana State Treasurer election was held on October 23, 1999, to elect the Louisiana State Treasurer. Democratic incumbent Ken Duncan ran for a second term but lost to fellow Democrat secretary of the Louisiana Department of Revenue and future senator John Kennedy. Kennedy won the election with a majority of the vote, so no runoff election was held.

== General election ==
=== Candidates ===
- Ken Duncan, incumbent Louisiana State Treasurer (1996–2000)
- John Kennedy, Secretary of the Louisiana Department of Revenue (1996–1999)

=== Results ===
1999 Louisiana State Treasurer election results
Party	Candidate	Votes	%
Democratic	John Kennedy	621,796	55.56%
Democratic	Ken Duncan (incumbent)	497,319	44.44%
Total votes		1,119,115	100.00%
Democratic hold			
