= TeleFile =

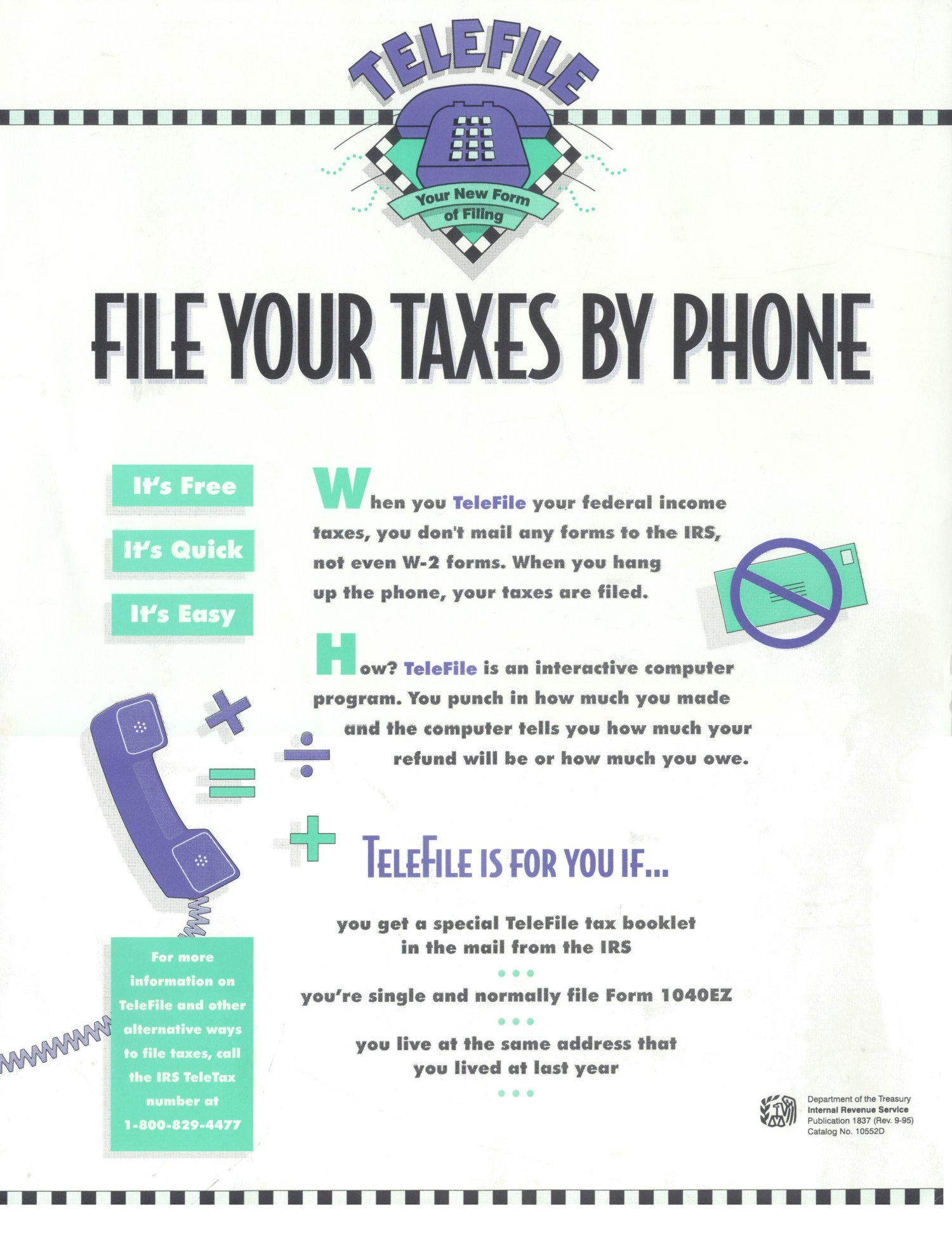

TeleFile was the U.S. Internal Revenue Service's automated voice-response system in place from 1992 through 2005.

The initial 1992 test involved 125,983 returns from Ohio residents. In 1997 TeleFile for employment taxes was introduced. In 2001 TeleFile was expanded to include the ability to file automatic extensions. The system allowed a user to have a refund directly deposited to a bank account, or a payment electronically extracted, by entering the routing number and account number.

In 2003, four million taxpayers used TeleFile, rather than complete the traditional 1040EZ form. However, on August 16, 2005, this method of filing was discontinued in favor of electronic filing. The IRS cited a decline in the number of TeleFile users, coupled with the costs involved in keeping the system operating.
