= United States Senate Appropriations Subcommittee on Financial Services and General Government =

U.S. Senate Appropriations Subcommittee on Financial Services and General Government is one of twelve subcommittees of the U.S. Senate Committee on Appropriations. It was renamed from the Subcommittee on District of Columbia in 2007 in order to align the operations of the House and Senate Appropriations Committees. The United States Senate Committee on Appropriations has joint jurisdiction with the United States House Committee on Appropriations over all appropriations bills in the United States Congress. Each committee has 12 matching subcommittees, each of which is tasked with working on one of the twelve annual regular appropriations bills. This subcommittee has jurisdiction over the budget for the United States Department of the Treasury and General Government (includes United States federal courts, the Executive Office of the President of the United States, and Washington, D.C. appropriations).

== Appropriations process ==
Traditionally, after a federal budget for the upcoming fiscal year has been passed, the appropriations subcommittees receive information about what the budget sets as their spending ceilings. This is called "302(b) allocations" after section 302(b) of the Congressional Budget Act of 1974. That amount is separated into smaller amounts for each of the twelve Subcommittees. The federal budget does not become law and is not signed by the President. Instead, it is guide for the House and the Senate in making appropriations and tax decisions. However, no budget is required and each chamber has procedures in place for what to do without one. The House and Senate now consider appropriations bills simultaneously, although originally the House went first. The House Committee on Appropriations usually reports the appropriations bills in May and June and the Senate in June. Any differences between appropriations bills passed by the House and the Senate are resolved in the fall.

== Appropriations bills ==
An appropriations bill is a bill that appropriates (gives to, sets aside for) money to specific federal government departments, agencies, and programs. The money provides funding for operations, personnel, equipment, and activities. Regular appropriations bills are passed annually, with the funding they provide covering one fiscal year. The fiscal year is the accounting period of the federal government, which runs from October 1 to September 30 of the following year.

There are three types of appropriations bills: regular appropriations bills, continuing resolutions, and supplemental appropriations bills. Regular appropriations bills are the twelve standard bills that cover the funding for the federal government for one fiscal year and that are supposed to be enacted into law by October 1. If Congress has not enacted the regular appropriations bills by the time, it can pass a continuing resolution, which continues the pre-existing appropriations at the same levels as the previous fiscal year (or with minor modifications) for a set amount of time. The third type of appropriations bills are supplemental appropriations bills, which add additional funding above and beyond what was originally appropriated at the beginning of the fiscal year. Supplemental appropriations bills can be used for things like disaster relief.

Appropriations bills are one part of a larger United States budget and spending process. They are preceded in that process by the president's budget proposal, congressional budget resolutions, and the 302(b) allocation. Article One of the United States Constitution, section 9, clause 7, states that "No money shall be drawn from the Treasury, but in Consequence of Appropriations made by Law..." This is what gives Congress the power to make these appropriations. The President, however, still has the power to veto appropriations bills.

== Jurisdiction ==
This subcommittee continues to have jurisdiction over the budget of the District of Columbia, and was given jurisdiction over agency funding handled by the Subcommittee on Transportation, Treasury, the Judiciary and Housing and Urban Development. The new subcommittee is responsible for funding general provisions of the federal government, with primary jurisdiction over discretionary spending of the Treasury Department, the United States federal judiciary, and the District of Columbia. The most diverse subcommittee, it also oversees funding for the Executive Office of the President and the Office of Management and Budget as well as various independent federal agencies, including the Federal Deposit Insurance Corporation, the Federal Communications Commission, the Federal Election Commission, the National Archives and Records Administration, and Office of National Drug Control Policy.

== Members, 119th Congress ==
Majority	Minority
Bill Hagerty, Tennessee, Chair; John Boozman, Arkansas; Susan Collins, Maine (until July 22, 2026); Markwayne Mullin, Oklahoma (until March 23, 2026); Deb Fischer, Nebraska; Jon Husted, Ohio (from March 27, 2026); Darline Graham, South Carolina (from July 22, 2026)	Jack Reed, Rhode Island, Ranking Member; Dick Durbin, Illinois; Chris Coons, Delaware; Chris Van Hollen, Maryland
Ex officio
Susan Collins, Maine (from July 22, 2026)	Patty Murray, Washington

== Historical subcommittee rosters ==
=== 116th Congress ===
Majority	Minority
John Kennedy, Louisiana, Chairman; Jerry Moran, Kansas; John Boozman, Arkansas; Steve Daines, Montana; James Lankford, Oklahoma	Chris Coons, Delaware, Ranking Member; Dick Durbin, Illinois; Joe Manchin, West Virginia; Chris Van Hollen, Maryland
Ex officio
Richard Shelby, Alabama	Patrick Leahy, Vermont

=== 117th Congress ===
Majority	Minority
Chris Van Hollen, Maryland, Chair; Chris Coons, Delaware; Dick Durbin, Illinois; Joe Manchin, West Virginia	Cindy Hyde-Smith, Mississippi, Ranking Member; Jerry Moran, Kansas; John Boozman, Arkansas; John Kennedy, Louisiana
Ex officio
Patrick Leahy, Vermont	Richard Shelby, Alabama

=== 118th Congress ===
Majority	Minority
Chris Van Hollen, Maryland, Chair; Chris Coons, Delaware; Dick Durbin, Illinois; Joe Manchin, West Virginia; Martin Heinrich, New Mexico	Bill Hagerty, Tennessee, Ranking Member; Marco Rubio, Florida; John Boozman, Arkansas; John Kennedy, Louisiana
Ex officio
Patty Murray, Washington	Susan Collins, Maine

== See also ==
- United States House Appropriations Subcommittee on Financial Services and General Government
