= Ben Bagert =

American attorney and politician (born 1944)

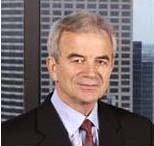

Member of the Louisiana Senate from the 4th district
- In office 1984–1992
- Preceded by: Michael O'Keefe
- Succeeded by: Marc Morial

Member of the Louisiana House of Representatives from the 98th district
- In office 1976–1984
- Succeeded by: Garey Forster

Member of the Louisiana House of Representatives from the 24th district
- In office 1970–1976
- Preceded by: Thomas A. Early Jr.

Personal details
- Born: Bernard John Bagert Jr. January 10, 1944 (age 82)
- Party: Democratic (before 1990); Republican (1990–present)
- Education: Loyola University, New Orleans (BA, JD)

Bernard John Bagert Jr. (born 1944) is an American attorney and politician. He served in the Louisiana State House from 1970 to 1984 and the Louisiana State Senate from 1984 to 1992, representing Orleans Parish as a Democrat.

He was a Republican candidate in the 1990 United States Senate election in Louisiana. He withdrew from the race to prevent David Duke from reaching a runoff election. He was also a candidate for attorney general in 1991, losing to Richard Ieyoub.

Party political offices
Vacant Title last held by Tom Stagg	Republican nominee for Attorney General of Louisiana; 1991	Vacant Title next held by Suzanne Haik Terrell
