= 1987 United States gubernatorial elections =

- October 24 and November 3, 1987

4 governorships 3 states; 1 territory
	Majority party	Minority party
Party	Democratic	Republican
Seats before	26	24
Seats after	26	24
Seat change	Steady	Steady
Seats up	3	0
Seats won	3	0
- Democratic hold

United States gubernatorial elections were held on November 3, 1987, in three states and one territory. Democrats retained all three seats up for election; although three new people were elected governor.

As of 2026, this is the last time where Louisiana, Kentucky, and Mississippi all elected governors from the same party simultaneously.

== Election results ==
State	Incumbent	Party	First elected	Result	Candidates
Kentucky	Martha Layne Collins	Democratic	1983	Incumbent term-limited. New governor elected. Democratic hold.	✓ Wallace Wilkinson (Democratic) 64.5%; John Harper (Republican) 34.9%
Louisiana	Edwin Edwards	Democratic	1972; 1979 (term-limited); 1983	Incumbent lost re-election and withdrew from advanced runoff. New governor elected. Democratic hold.	✓ Buddy Roemer (Democratic) 33.2%; Edwin Edwards (Democratic) 27.9%; Bob Livingston (Republican) 18.5%; Billy Tauzin (Democratic) 9.9%; Jim Brown (Democratic) 8.9%; Speedy Long (Democratic) 1.2%
Mississippi	William Allain	Democratic	1983	Incumbent term-limited. New governor elected. Democratic hold.	✓ Ray Mabus (Democratic) 53.4%; Jack Reed (Republican) 46.6%

== Close states ==
States where the margin of victory was under 10%:

1. Louisiana, 5.3%
2. Mississippi, 6.8%

== Kentucky ==
1987 Kentucky gubernatorial election
- November 3, 1987
- Turnout: 39.9% ▼15.8 pp
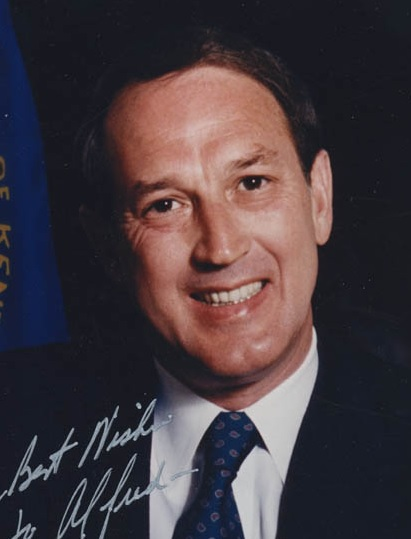

Nominee	Wallace Wilkinson	John Harper
Party	Democratic	Republican
Popular vote	504,674	273,141
Percentage	64.50%	34.91%
- Wilkinson: 50–60% 60–70% 70–80% 80–90% Harper: 50–60% 60–70%
Governor before election
Martha Layne Collins
Democratic
Elected Governor
Wallace Wilkinson
Democratic

The 1987 Kentucky gubernatorial election was held on November 3, 1987. Democratic nominee Wallace Wilkinson defeated Republican nominee John Harper with 64.50% of the vote.

== Louisiana ==
1987 Louisiana gubernatorial election
- October 24, 1987 (first round)
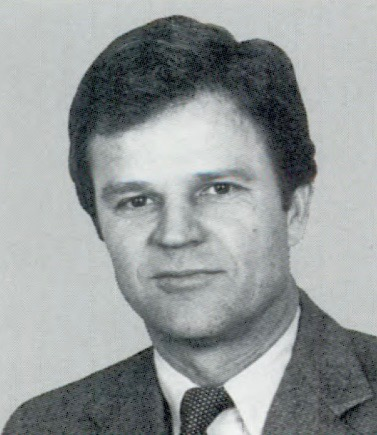

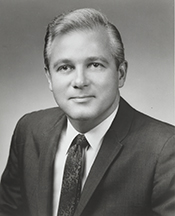

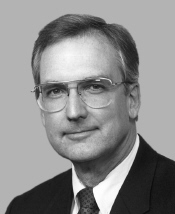

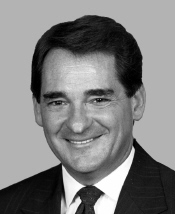
Candidate	Buddy Roemer	Edwin Edwards	Bob Livingston
Party	Democratic	Democratic	Republican
First round	516,078; 33.11%	437,801; 28.09%	287,780; 18.46%
Runoff	Winner by default	Withdrew	Eliminated
Candidate	Billy Tauzin	James H. "Jim" Brown
Party	Democratic	Democratic
First round	154,079; 9.88%	138,223; 8.87%
Runoff	Eliminated	Eliminated
- Roemer: 20–30% 30–40% 40–50% 50–60% 60–70% 70–80% Edwards: 20–30% 30–40% 40–50% Livingston: 30–40% 40–50% Tauzin: 20–30% 30–40% 50–60%
Governor before election
Edwin Edwards
Democratic
Elected Governor
Buddy Roemer
Democratic

The 1987 Louisiana gubernatorial election was held to elect the governor of Louisiana. Three-term incumbent Democratic governor Edwin Edwards lost re-election to a fourth term, defeated by Democratic congressman Buddy Roemer.

Edwin Edwards defeated Governor Dave Treen in the 1983 election. Edwards was prosecuted as governor by U.S. District Attorney John Volz for selling hospital certificates, but the first trial results in a hung jury before Edwards was acquitted.

Under Louisiana's jungle primary system, all candidates appear on the same ballot, regardless of party, and voters may vote for any candidate, regardless of their party affiliation. On October 24, 1987, Roemer and Edwards took the two highest popular vote counts. As neither took over 50% a runoff was scheduled, but Edwards withdrew, causing the runoff's cancellation.

== Mississippi ==
1987 Mississippi gubernatorial election
- November 3, 1987
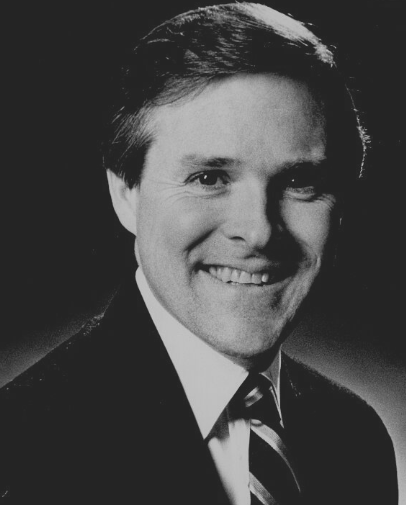

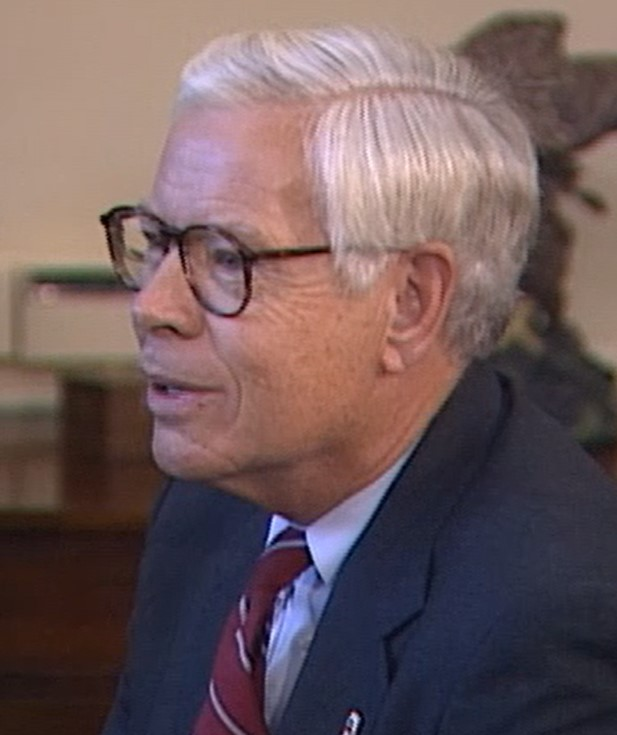
Nominee	Ray Mabus	Jack Reed
Party	Democratic	Republican
Popular vote	385,689	336,006
Percentage	53.44%	46.56%
- County results Mabus: 50-60% 60-70% 70-80% 80-90% Reed: 50-60% 60-70%
Governor before election
William Allain
Democratic
Elected Governor
Ray Mabus
Democratic

The 1987 Mississippi gubernatorial election took place on November 3, 1987 to elect the governor of Mississippi.

== Sources ==
- Moreland, Laurence; Steed, Robert; Baker, Tod, eds. (1991). The 1988 Presidential Election in the South: Continuity Amidst Change in Southern Party Politics. Praeger Publishers. ISBN 0275931455.
