= Electoral history of David Duke =

Elections featuring American politician

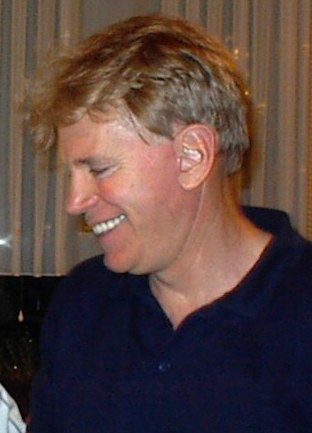
Duke in 2002

David Duke is an American neo-Nazi, antisemitic conspiracy theorist, far-right politician, convicted felon, and former grand wizard of the Knights of the Ku Klux Klan. From 1989 to 1992, he was a member of the Louisiana House of Representatives. He has been a perennial candidate for various offices throughout his life.

== Elections in Louisiana ==
=== 1975 ===
1975 Louisiana State Senate District 16 Election
Party	Candidate	Votes	%
Democratic	Kenneth Osterberger	22,287	66.80%
Democratic	David Duke	11,079	33.20%

=== 1979 ===
1979 Louisiana State Senate District 10 Election
Party	Candidate	Votes	%
Democratic	Joseph Tiemann	21,329	56.60%
Democratic	David Duke	9,897	26.60%
	Others	6,459	17.14%

=== 1990 ===
1990 United States Senate election in Louisiana
Party	Candidate	Votes	%
Democratic	J. Bennett Johnston (incumbent)	753,198	53.95%
Republican	David Duke	607,091	43.48%
Democratic	Nick Joseph Accardo	21,578	1.55%
Democratic	Larry Crowe	14,345	1.03%
Majority		146,107	10.47%
Total votes		1,396,212	100.00%
Democratic hold			

Support for Duke by parish in red:

=== 1991 ===
1991 Louisiana gubernatorial election jungle primary
Party	Candidate	Votes	%
Democratic	Edwin Edwards	523,096	33.76
Republican	David Duke	491,342	31.71
Republican	Buddy Roemer (incumbent)	410,690	26.51
Republican	Clyde C. Holloway	82,683	5.34
Democratic	Sam S. Jones	11,847	0.76
Other	Ed Karst	9,663	0.62
Democratic	Fred Dent	7,385	0.48
Republican	Anne Thompson	4,118	0.27
Democratic	Jim Crowley	4,000	0.26
Democratic	Albert Powell	2,053	0.13
Other	Ronnie Johnson	1,372	0.09
Democratic	Cousin Ken Lewis	1,006	0.06
Total		1,549,255	100

1991 Louisiana gubernatorial election runoff
Party	Candidate	Votes	%
Democratic	Edwin Edwards	1,057,031	61.17%
Republican	David Duke	671,009	38.83%
Majority		386,022	22.34%
Total		1,728,040	100
Democratic gain from Republican			

Support for Duke by parish in red:

=== 1996 ===
1996 United States Senate election in Louisiana jungle primary
Party	Candidate	Votes	%
Republican	'Woody Jenkins'	322,244	26.23%
Democratic	'Mary Landrieu'	'264,268'	'21.51%'
Democratic	Richard Ieyoub	250,682	20.41%
Republican	David Duke	141,489	11.52%
Republican	Jimmy Hayes	71,699	5.84%
Republican	Bill Linder	58,243	4.74%
Republican	Chuck McMains	45,164	3.68%
Republican	Peggy Wilson	31,877	2.60%
Democratic	Troyce Guice	15,277	1.24%
Independent	Nicholas J. Accardo	10,035	0.82%
Independent	Arthur D. "Jim" Nichols	7,894	0.64%
Democratic	Sadie Roberts-Joseph	4,660	0.38%
Independent	Tom Kirk	1,987	0.16%
Independent	Darryl Paul Ward	1,770	0.14%
Independent	Sam Houston Melton, Jr.	1,270	0.10%
Turnout		1,228,559	100.00%

=== 1999 ===
1999 Louisiana's 1st congressional district special election jungle primary
Party	Candidate	Votes	%
Republican	'David Treen'	'36,719'	'25.06%'
Republican	'David Vitter'	'31,741'	'21.67%'
Republican	David Duke	28,059	19.15%
Republican	Monica Monica	22,928	15.65%
Democratic	R.H. "Bill" Strain	16,446	11.23%
Republican	Rob Couhig	9,295	6.34%
Democratic	Darryl Ward	720	0.49%
Republican	Patrick Landry	344	0.23%
Republican	S. J. LoCoco	246	0.17%
Total votes		146,498	100%

=== 2016 ===
2016 United States Senate election in Louisiana jungle primary
Party	Candidate	Votes	%
Republican	'John Kennedy'	'482,591'	'25.0'
Democratic	'Foster Campbell'	'337,833'	'17.5'
Republican	Charles Boustany	298,008	15.4
Democratic	Caroline Fayard	240,917	12.5
Republican	John Fleming	204,026	10.6
Republican	Rob Maness	90,856	4.7
Republican	David Duke	58,606	3.0
Democratic	Derrick Edwards	51,774	2.7
Democratic	Gary Landrieu	45,587	2.4
Republican	Donald "Crawdaddy" Crawford	25,523	1.3
Republican	Joseph Cao	21,019	1.1
Independent	Beryl Billiot	19,352	1.0
Libertarian	Thomas Clements	11,370	0.6
Independent	Troy Hebert	9,503	0.5
Democratic	Josh Pellerin	7,395	0.4
Democratic	Peter Williams	6,855	0.4
Democratic	Vinny Mendoza	4,927	0.3
Independent	Kaitlin Marone	4,108	0.2
Libertarian	Le Roy Gillam	4,067	0.2
Republican	Charles Marsala	3,684	0.2
Republican	Abhay Patel	1,576	0.1
Independent	Arden Wells	1,483	0.1
Independent	Bob Lang	1,424	0.1
Independent	Gregory Taylor	1,151	0.1
Total votes		1,933,635	100.0

Support for Duke by parish:
>8%
7–8%
6–7%
5–6%
4–5%
3–4%
2–3%
1–2%
<1%

== Federal elections ==
=== 1988 ===
1988 Democratic Party presidential primaries
Party	Candidate	Votes	%
Democratic	Michael Dukakis	9,898,750	42.46%
Democratic	Jesse Jackson	6,788,991	29.12%
Democratic	Al Gore	3,185,806	13.67%
Democratic	Dick Gephardt	1,399,041	6.00%
Democratic	Paul M. Simon	1,082,960	4.65%
Democratic	Gary Hart	415,716	1.78%
Democratic	Unpledged delegates	250,307	1.07%
Democratic	Bruce Babbitt	77,780	0.33%
Democratic	Lyndon LaRouche	70,938	0.30%
Democratic	David Duke	45,289	0.19%
Democratic	James Traficant	30,879	0.13%

Duke received 47,047 votes from twenty states with his best results coming from the southern states. He came third in place in states like Arkansas, Kentucky, Louisiana, and Mississippi.

1988 Democratic presidential primaries
State	Vote percentage	Votes	Result	Reference
Arkansas	0.97 / 100	4,805	Lost	
Louisiana	3.74 / 100	23,391	Lost	
Missouri	0.33 / 100	1,760	Lost	
New Hampshire	0.21 / 100	264	Lost	
New Jersey	0.38 / 100	2,491	Lost	
Oklahoma	0.61 / 100	2,388	Lost	
Texas	0.50 / 100	8,808	Lost	
West Virginia	0.41 / 100	1,383	Lost	
Total		45,290	Lost	

1988 United States presidential election
State	Vote percentage	Votes	Result	Reference
Arizona	0.01 / 100	113	Lost	
Arkansas	0.62 / 100	5,146	Lost	
California	0.00 / 100	483	Lost	
Colorado	0.01 / 100	139	Lost	
Florida	0.01 / 100	249	Lost	
Iowa	0.06 / 100	755	Lost	
Kentucky	0.34 / 100	4,494	Lost	
Louisiana	1.14 / 100	18,612	Lost	
Michigan	0.00 / 100	60	Lost	
Minnesota	0.07 / 100	1,529	Lost	
Mississippi	0.45 / 100	4,232	Lost	
Missouri	0.00 / 100	44	Lost	
New Jersey	0.08 / 100	2,446	Lost	
Oregon	0.01 / 100	90	Lost	
Pennsylvania	0.08 / 100	3,444	Lost	
Rhode Island	0.04 / 100	159	Lost	
Tennessee	0.11 / 100	1,807	Lost	
Vermont	0.08 / 100	189	Lost	
Wisconsin	0.14 / 100	3,056	Lost	
Total	0.05 / 100	47,047	Lost	

=== 1992 ===
1992 Republican Party presidential primaries
Party	Candidate	Votes	%
Republican	George H. W. Bush (incumbent)	9,199,463	72.84%
Republican	Pat Buchanan	2,899,488	22.96%
Republican	Uncommitted	287,383	2.28%
Republican	David Duke	119,115	0.94%
Republican	Ross Perot	56,136	0.44%
Republican	Pat Paulsen	10,984	0.09%
Republican	Maurice Horton	9,637	0.08%
Republican	Harold Stassen	8,099	0.06%
Total votes		3,390,842	100.00%

Vote percentage received by David Duke in the 1992 Republican primary by state or territory

1992 Republican presidential primaries
State	Vote percentage	Votes	Result	Reference
Oklahoma	2.61 / 100	5,672	Lost	
Connecticut	2.30 / 100	2,294	Lost	
Kansas	1.80 / 100	3,837	Lost	
Louisiana	8.85 / 100	11,956	Lost	
Massachusetts	2.01 / 100	5,557	Lost	
Michigan	2.38 / 100	10,688	Lost	
Mississippi	10.62 / 100	16,426	Lost	
Nebraska	1.46 / 100	2,808	Lost	
Oklahoma	2.60 / 100	5,672	Lost	
Oregon	2.19 / 100	6,667	Lost	
Puerto Rico	0.31 / 100	827	Lost	
Rhode Island	2.08 / 100	326	Lost	
South Carolina	7.09 / 100	10,553	Lost	
Tennessee	3.14 / 100	7,709	Lost	
Texas	2.54 / 100	20,255	Lost	
Washington	1.16 / 100	1,501	Lost	
Wisconsin	2.67 / 100	12,867	Lost	
