= 1992 United States presidential election in Louisiana =

- November 3, 1992

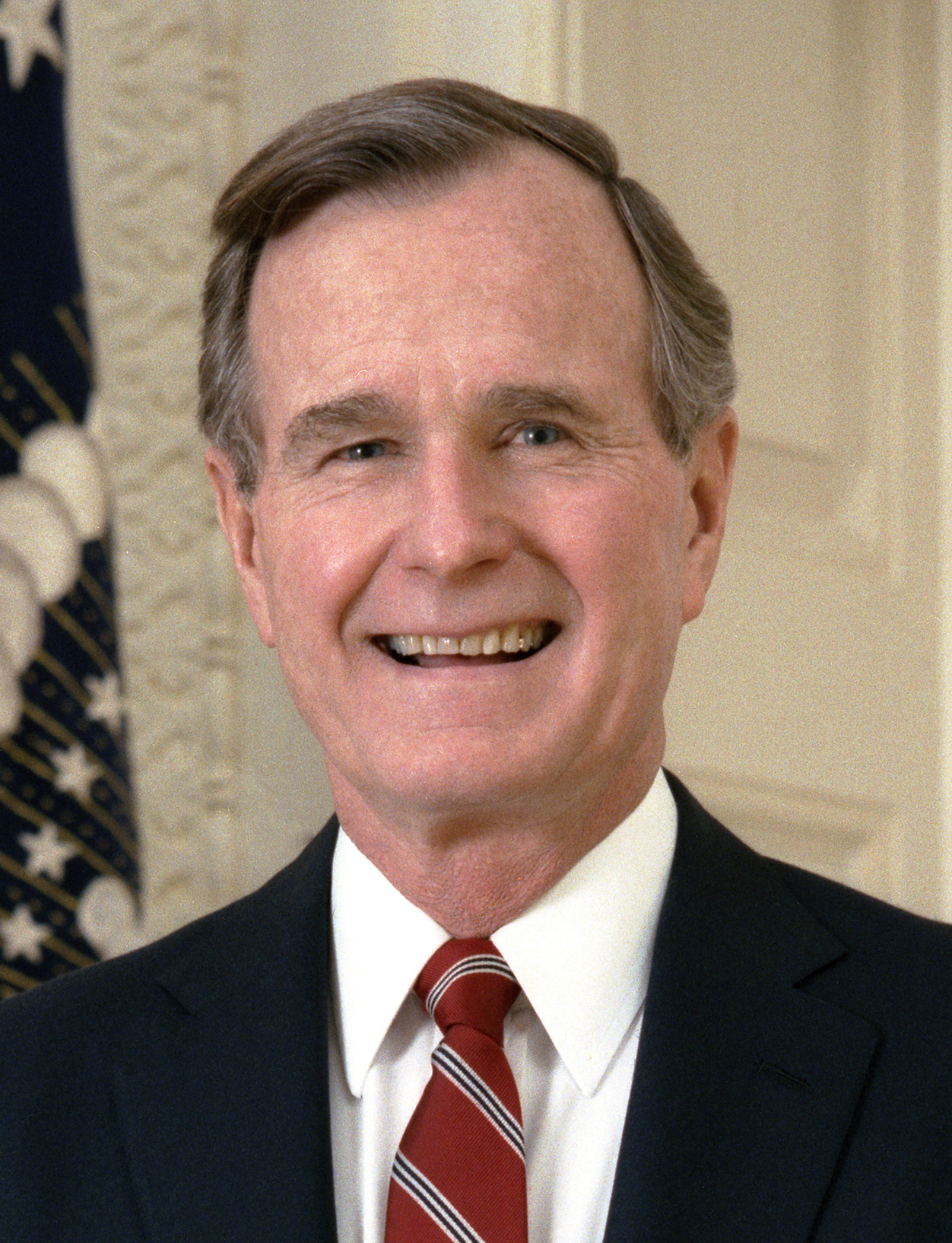

Nominee	Bill Clinton	George H. W. Bush	Ross Perot
Party	Democratic	Republican	Prudence, Action, Results
Alliance			Independent
Home state	Arkansas	Texas	Texas
Running mate	Al Gore	Dan Quayle	James Stockdale
Electoral vote	9	0	0
Popular vote	815,971	733,386	211,478
Percentage	45.58%	40.97%	11.81%
Parish results
Clinton
40–50%
50–60%
60–70%
Bush
40–50%
50–60%
President before election
George H. W. Bush
Republican
Elected President
Bill Clinton
Democratic

The 1992 United States presidential election in Louisiana took place on November 3, 1992, as part of the 1992 United States presidential election. Voters chose nine representatives, or electors, to the Electoral College, who voted for president and vice president.

Louisiana was won by Governor Bill Clinton, a major swing from the statewide results in 1988 when Republican nominee George H. W. Bush carried the state with 54% of the vote and with a double-digit margin of victory. Clinton performed strongly in both urban and rural areas of Louisiana and carried a majority of the state's parishes. Independent Ross Perot gathered 11.81% of the vote, a strong showing for a third-party candidate, but still his sixth-weakest state. Perot did best in the southwestern Acadian bayou parishes, reaching almost 23 percent in Cameron Parish.

== Background ==
Louisiana lost one congressional district as a result of the 1990 Census.

The percentage of registered voters in Louisiana who were Republicans rose from 16.4% in 1988 to 19.1% in 1992, while the Democratic figure fell from 75.2% to 71.3%.

== Primary ==
=== Democratic ===
Bill Clinton won 59 delegates, while Paul Tsongas won one delegate.

Bill Clinton

Statewide officials

- Edwin Edwards, 50th governor of Louisiana (1972-1980; 1984-1988; 1992-1996)
- Mary Landrieu, Louisiana state treasurer (1988-1996)
- Melinda Schwegmann, 49th lieutenant governor of Louisiana (1992-1996)

Local officials

- Sidney Barthelemy, 58th mayor of New Orleans (1986–1994)

=== Republican ===
Billy Nungesser, the chair of the Republican Party of Louisiana, endorsed Pat Buchanan. He was the only state chair to not endorse George H. W. Bush, and Nungesser survived an attempt to remove him as chair for endorsing Buchanan. Richard Baker, Jack Kemp, W. Fox McKeithen, Henson Moore, and Dave Treen campaigned for Bush.

Bush won Louisiana and all of its delegates, but it was his worst performance on Super Tuesday. David Duke, who ran in the Democratic presidential primary in 1988, received fewer votes than in his previous presidential campaign.

Pat Buchanan

Party officials

- Billy Nungesser, chair of the Republican Party of Louisiana

== General ==
Clinton hosted an event in the Louisiana Superdome, where the 1988 Republican National Convention was held, on July 29. He was the first presidential candidate to campaign in Lake Charles, Louisiana since John F. Kennedy in 1960. Treasurer Mary Landrieu was the co-chair of Clinton's campaign in the state.

Ross Perot's campaign in the state started with a meeting of 50 volunteers in Alexandria, Louisiana. He had 150 full-time and 1,000 party-time volunteers. His campaign collected over 70,000 signatures, far greater than the 5,000 required to appear on the ballot. He appeared on the ballot as the nominee of the Prudence, Action, Results Party.

78.5% of registered voters and 60.1% of the voting age population participated in the election. 81.5% of white voters and 71% of black voters participated.

== Results ==
1992 United States presidential election in Louisiana
Party	Candidate	Votes	Percentage	Electoral votes
Democratic	Bill Clinton	815,971	45.58%	9
Republican	George H. W. Bush (incumbent)	733,386	40.97%	0
Prudence, Action, Results	Ross Perot	211,478	11.81%	0
America First	James "Bo" Gritz	18,545	1.04%	0
Libertarian	Andre Marrou	3,155	0.18%	0
Equal Justice and Opportunity	Ron Daniels	1,663	0.09%	0
Taxpayers’	Howard Phillips	1,663	0.09%	0
More Perfect Democracy	Lenora Fulani	1,434	0.08%	0
Justice, Industry, Agriculture	Lyndon LaRouche	1,136	0.06%	0
Natural Law	Dr. John Hagelin	889	0.05%	0
Independent	John Yiamouyiannis	808	0.05%	0
Totals		1,790,017	100.00%	9
Voter turnout (voting age population)				

=== Results by congressional district ===
Clinton won four of seven congressional districts.

District	Bush	Clinton	Perot	Representative
1st	56%	32%	12%	Bob Livingston
2nd	24%	69%	6%	William J. Jefferson
3rd	40%	44%	14%	Billy Tauzin
4th	24%	67%	7%	Cleo Fields
5th	48%	36%	14%	Jim McCrery
6th	50%	34%	13%	Richard H. Baker
7th	47%	37%	14%	Jimmy Hayes

=== Results by parish ===
Parish	Bill Clinton Democratic		George H.W. Bush Republican		Ross Perot Independent		Bo Gritz America First		Various candidates Other parties		Margin		Total votes cast
Parish	#	%	#	%	#	%	#	%	#	%	#	%	Total votes cast
Acadia	12,276	49.97%	9,017	36.70%	3,145	12.80%	41	0.17%	89	0.36%	3,259	13.27%	24,568
Allen	5,626	56.16%	3,069	30.64%	1,245	12.43%	37	0.37%	40	0.40%	2,557	25.52%	10,017
Ascension	13,036	46.98%	10,275	37.03%	4,295	15.48%	38	0.14%	104	0.37%	2,761	9.95%	27,748
Assumption	5,639	53.95%	2,928	28.01%	1,358	12.99%	408	3.90%	120	1.15%	2,711	25.94%	10,453
Avoyelles	8,696	52.55%	4,851	29.31%	2,139	12.93%	652	3.94%	211	1.28%	3,845	23.24%	16,549
Beauregard	5,037	40.13%	5,119	40.79%	2,103	16.76%	216	1.72%	76	0.61%	-82	-0.66%	12,551
Bienville	3,899	52.46%	2,412	32.45%	832	11.19%	221	2.97%	68	0.91%	1,487	20.01%	7,432
Bossier	11,313	34.49%	15,628	47.64%	4,863	14.83%	859	2.62%	138	0.42%	-4,315	-13.15%	32,801
Caddo	47,733	46.49%	42,665	41.55%	11,830	11.52%	128	0.12%	322	0.31%	5,068	4.94%	102,678
Calcasieu	33,570	48.05%	24,847	35.57%	10,980	15.72%	151	0.22%	314	0.45%	8,723	12.48%	69,862
Caldwell	2,061	44.00%	1,752	37.40%	653	13.94%	164	3.50%	54	1.15%	309	6.60%	4,684
Cameron	1,985	45.76%	1,329	30.64%	995	22.94%	13	0.30%	16	0.37%	656	15.12%	4,338
Catahoula	2,570	46.97%	1,976	36.12%	773	14.13%	99	1.81%	53	0.97%	594	10.85%	5,471
Claiborne	3,263	46.64%	2,599	37.15%	926	13.24%	156	2.23%	52	0.74%	664	9.49%	6,996
Concordia	4,283	46.82%	3,223	35.23%	1,317	14.40%	242	2.65%	83	0.91%	1,060	11.59%	9,148
DeSoto	5,671	51.46%	3,643	33.06%	1,358	12.32%	239	2.17%	110	1.00%	2,028	18.40%	11,021
East Baton Rouge	68,622	41.17%	81,072	48.64%	16,102	9.66%	183	0.11%	712	0.43%	-12,450	-7.47%	166,691
East Carroll	1,835	54.37%	1,142	33.84%	283	8.39%	59	1.75%	56	1.66%	693	20.53%	3,375
East Feliciana	4,093	51.84%	2,813	35.63%	932	11.80%	14	0.18%	43	0.54%	1,280	16.21%	7,895
Evangeline	8,564	52.30%	5,147	31.43%	2,124	12.97%	336	2.05%	205	1.25%	3,417	20.87%	16,376
Franklin	4,127	42.75%	3,889	40.29%	1,311	13.58%	226	2.34%	100	1.04%	238	2.46%	9,653
Grant	3,122	39.63%	3,214	40.80%	1,174	14.90%	286	3.63%	82	1.04%	-92	-1.17%	7,878
Iberia	13,040	42.71%	11,905	38.99%	4,337	14.21%	1,011	3.31%	237	0.78%	1,135	3.72%	30,530
Iberville	8,218	52.70%	5,211	33.42%	1,543	9.89%	326	2.09%	296	1.90%	3,007	19.28%	15,594
Jackson	3,370	44.54%	3,072	40.60%	882	11.66%	169	2.23%	73	0.96%	298	3.94%	7,566
Jefferson	64,302	34.38%	100,493	53.73%	21,278	11.38%	253	0.14%	712	0.38%	-36,191	-19.35%	187,038
Jefferson Davis	7,022	50.74%	4,513	32.61%	2,221	16.05%	34	0.25%	48	0.35%	2,509	18.13%	13,838
Lafayette	28,583	39.83%	32,406	45.16%	9,124	12.71%	1,217	1.70%	432	0.60%	-3,823	-5.33%	71,762
Lafourche	16,182	45.40%	12,744	35.75%	5,077	14.24%	1,372	3.85%	270	0.76%	3,438	9.65%	35,645
LaSalle	2,389	35.53%	3,068	45.63%	993	14.77%	221	3.29%	52	0.77%	-679	-10.10%	6,723
Lincoln	7,205	43.51%	7,220	43.60%	1,751	10.57%	282	1.70%	103	0.62%	-15	-0.09%	16,561
Livingston	11,499	36.60%	14,808	47.13%	4,971	15.82%	54	0.17%	89	0.28%	-3,309	-10.53%	31,421
Madison	2,773	54.31%	1,702	33.33%	469	9.19%	105	2.06%	57	1.12%	1,071	20.98%	5,106
Morehouse	6,013	44.66%	5,364	39.84%	1,727	12.83%	255	1.89%	104	0.77%	649	4.82%	13,463
Natchitoches	6,974	47.19%	5,694	38.53%	1,606	10.87%	369	2.50%	136	0.92%	1,280	8.66%	14,779
Orleans	133,261	67.53%	52,019	26.36%	10,889	5.52%	211	0.11%	969	0.49%	81,242	41.17%	197,349
Ouachita	20,835	36.87%	27,600	48.85%	6,612	11.70%	1,117	1.98%	338	0.60%	-6,765	-11.98%	56,502
Plaquemines	4,467	39.68%	5,018	44.58%	1,729	15.36%	16	0.14%	27	0.24%	-551	-4.90%	11,257
Pointe Coupee	6,512	57.52%	3,563	31.47%	1,157	10.22%	34	0.30%	56	0.49%	2,949	26.05%	11,322
Rapides	20,873	40.23%	22,783	43.91%	6,599	12.72%	1,169	2.25%	458	0.88%	-1,910	-3.68%	51,882
Red River	2,360	50.43%	1,649	35.24%	566	12.09%	67	1.43%	38	0.81%	711	15.19%	4,680
Richland	3,706	41.63%	3,808	42.77%	1,054	11.84%	247	2.77%	88	0.99%	-102	-1.14%	8,903
Sabine	4,173	44.64%	3,586	38.36%	1,219	13.04%	283	3.03%	87	0.93%	587	6.28%	9,348
St. Bernard	12,305	37.36%	16,131	48.97%	4,308	13.08%	55	0.17%	139	0.42%	-3,826	-11.61%	32,938
St. Charles	8,810	42.20%	9,158	43.87%	2,593	12.42%	118	0.57%	198	0.95%	-348	-1.67%	20,877
St. Helena	3,416	60.80%	1,515	26.97%	589	10.48%	36	0.64%	62	1.10%	1,901	33.83%	5,618
St. James	6,609	59.08%	3,339	29.85%	993	8.88%	73	0.65%	172	1.54%	3,270	29.23%	11,186
St. John the Baptist	8,977	50.29%	6,730	37.70%	1,922	10.77%	83	0.46%	139	0.78%	2,247	12.59%	17,851
St. Landry	20,383	55.37%	11,882	32.27%	4,266	11.59%	67	0.18%	217	0.59%	8,501	23.10%	36,815
St. Martin	11,252	55.09%	5,909	28.93%	2,573	12.60%	453	2.22%	239	1.17%	5,343	26.16%	20,426
St. Mary	10,648	45.43%	8,792	37.51%	3,257	13.90%	501	2.14%	242	1.03%	1,856	7.92%	23,440
St. Tammany	19,735	29.49%	37,839	56.54%	9,005	13.46%	96	0.14%	246	0.37%	-18,104	-27.05%	66,921
Tangipahoa	15,194	44.37%	14,128	41.26%	4,612	13.47%	73	0.21%	238	0.69%	1,066	3.11%	34,245
Tensas	1,666	51.01%	1,153	35.30%	353	10.81%	47	1.44%	47	1.44%	513	15.71%	3,266
Terrebonne	13,325	38.44%	14,662	42.30%	5,505	15.88%	951	2.74%	221	0.64%	-1,337	-3.86%	34,664
Union	4,005	39.78%	4,434	44.04%	1,209	12.01%	348	3.46%	73	0.72%	-429	-4.26%	10,069
Vermilion	12,324	52.57%	7,062	30.12%	3,127	13.34%	786	3.35%	145	0.62%	5,262	22.45%	23,444
Vernon	6,005	40.66%	5,912	40.04%	2,313	15.66%	413	2.80%	124	0.84%	93	0.62%	14,767
Washington	9,095	48.50%	7,227	38.54%	2,303	12.28%	43	0.23%	85	0.45%	1,868	9.96%	18,753
Webster	8,380	45.88%	6,640	36.36%	2,629	14.39%	478	2.62%	137	0.75%	1,740	9.52%	18,264
West Baton Rouge	5,131	51.43%	3,522	35.30%	1,249	12.52%	15	0.15%	59	0.59%	1,609	16.13%	9,976
West Carroll	2,068	40.39%	2,082	40.66%	771	15.06%	145	2.83%	54	1.05%	-14	-0.27%	5,120
West Feliciana	2,328	53.22%	1,501	34.32%	516	11.80%	11	0.25%	18	0.41%	827	18.90%	4,374
Winn	3,537	46.85%	2,932	38.84%	843	11.17%	173	2.29%	64	0.85%	605	8.01%	7,549
Totals	815,971	45.58%	733,386	40.97%	211,478	11.81%	18,545	1.04%	10,637	0.59%	82,585	4.61%	1,790,017

==== Parishes that flipped from Republican to Democratic ====
- Avoyelles
- Caddo
- Caldwell
- Catahoula
- Claiborne
- Concordia
- Franklin
- Iberia
- Jackson
- Lafourche
- Morehouse
- Natchitoches
- Red River
- Sabine
- St. Mary
- Tangipahoa
- Tensas
- Vernon
- Washington
- Webster
- Winn

== See also ==
- United States presidential elections in Louisiana
- Presidency of Bill Clinton

== Works cited ==
- Steed, Robert; Moreland, Laurence; Baker, Tod, eds. (1994). The 1992 Presidential Election in the South: Current Patterns of Southern Party and Electoral Politics. Praeger Publishers. ISBN 0275945340.
