= 1988 United States presidential election in Louisiana =

- November 8, 1988

| Nominee | George H. W. Bush | Michael Dukakis |
| Party | Republican | Democratic |
| Home state | Texas | Massachusetts |
| Running mate | Dan Quayle | Lloyd Bentsen |
| Electoral vote | 10 | 0 |
| Popular vote | 883,702 | 717,460 |
| Percentage | 54.27% | 44.06% |
Parish results
Bush
40–50%
50–60%
60–70%
70–80%
Dukakis
40–50%
50–60%
60–70%
President before election
Ronald Reagan
Republican
Elected President
George H. W. Bush
Republican

The 1988 United States presidential election in Louisiana took place on November 8, 1988, as part of the 1988 United States presidential election. State voters chose ten representatives, or electors to the Electoral College, who voted for president and vice president.

Louisiana strongly voted for the Republican nominee, Vice President George H. W. Bush, over the Democratic nominee, Massachusetts governor Michael Dukakis. The margin was 10%, which was nonetheless the best showing for Dukakis in a former Confederate state. This result made Louisiana 2.4% more Republican than the nation-at-large.

== Background ==
The percentage of registered voters in Louisiana who were Republicans rose from 11.3% in 1984 to 16.4% in 1988 while the Democratic figure fell from 80.6% to 75.2%.

== Campaign ==
=== Republican primary ===
The Southern Republican Leadership Conference had all of the presidential candidates committed to attend its February meeting in New Orleans, but none of them came as they were instead focused on the New Hampshire primary.

The Republicans conducted a voter registration campaign that increased the amount of registered Republicans by 25,063 between the 1987 gubernatorial primary and Super Tuesday and an additional 36,100 were registered before the presidential election. Turnout in the Republican primary rose to 19% from 5% in 1984, and 10% in 1980. In the Republican primary George H. W. Bush earned all of the delegates by placing first in every congressional district; 27% of white voters participated in the Republican primary.

Seven uncommitted delegates were selected by the central committee Republican Party of Louisiana on March 19. Supporters of Pat Robertson and Jack Kemp, who totaled 58 of the 140 committee members, formed a coalition to take over the party. The coalition failed to gain the position of chair, but won the position of secretary, national committeeman, and three of the seven alternate delegates.

1988 Louisiana Republican presidential primary
| Candidate | Votes | % | Delegates |
|---|---|---|---|
| George H. W. Bush | 83,684 | 57.80 | 34 (Note: 24 delegates allocated through congressional districts and 10 delegates allocated statewide) (Note: Final delegate total of 41 after addition of at-large delegates at state convention) |
| Pat Robertson | 26,294 | 18.16 | 0 |
| Bob Dole | 25,624 | 17.70 | 0 |
| Jack Kemp | 7,722 | 5.33 | 0 |
| Pete du Pont (withdrawn) | 851 | 0.59 | 0 |
| Alexander Haig (withdrawn) | 598 | 0.41 | 0 |
| Total | 144,773 | 100% | 34 |

=== Democratic primary ===
The Louisiana Democratic Party planned a Summit on Super Tuesday event in January, which all of the presidential candidates agreed to attend, but only Al Gore came.

Turnout in the Democratic primary rose to 24% from 14% in 1984, and 11% in 1980. Jesse Jackson and Gore were the only Democratic candidates to receive more than 15% in the primary and received 21 and 15 delegates respectively. Michael Dukakis and Dick Gephardt both won two delegates. The racial composition of the primary was 62% white and 38% black.

The central committee of the Louisiana Democratic Party allocated an additional 10 at-large delegates to Jackson, 8 to Gore, and four to Dukakis on June 4, 1988. The state's delegation also included 14 uncommitted superdelegates. Endorsements resulted in the delegation being divided between 41 delegates for Jackson, 33 for Dukakis, and one for Gephardt. John Breaux was selected as the delegation's chair while negotiations with the Jackson delegation produced William Jefferson as co-chair and Sidney Barthelemy as a member of the Democratic National Committee.

Governor Buddy Roemer stated that he would vote for Dukakis, but not support him and stated that he had "never seen a more unfocused, unorganized, non-issue campaign" in his life.

1988 Louisiana Democratic presidential primary
| Candidate | Votes | % | Delegates |
|---|---|---|---|
| Jesse Jackson | 221,522 | 35.44 | 21 (Note: Final delegate total of 31 after addition of at-large delegates at state convention) |
| Al Gore | 174,971 | 27.99 | 15 (Note: Final delegate total of 31 after addition of at-large delegates at state convention) |
| Michael Dukakis | 95,661 | 15.31 | 2 (Note: Final delegate total of 6 after addition of at-large delegates at state convention) |
| Dick Gephardt | 67,029 | 10.72 | 2 |
| Gary Hart | 26,437 | 4.23 | 0 |
| David Duke | 23,391 | 3.74 | 0 |
| Paul Simon | 5,153 | 0.82 | 0 |
| Frank Ahern | 3,702 | 0.59 | 0 |
| Bruce Babbitt (withdrawn) | 3,076 | 0.49 | 0 |
| Lyndon LaRouche | 1,681 | 0.27 | 0 |
| Norbert G. Dennerll Jr. | 1,574 | 0.25 | 0 |
| Richard B. Kay | 822 | 0.13 | 0 |
| Total | 625,019 | 100% | 40 |

=== General ===
Among white voters, 68% supported Bush while 30% supported Dukakis.

The Democrats maintained their control over the Louisiana House of Representatives, with 90 seats to the Republicans' 17 seats, and Louisiana State Senate, with 37 seats to the Republicans' 2 seats, despite Bush's victory in the presidential race.

== Results ==
1988 United States presidential election in Louisiana
| Party | Candidate | Votes | Percentage | Electoral votes |
|---|---|---|---|---|
| Republican | George H. W. Bush | 883,702 | 54.27% | 10 |
| Democratic | Michael Dukakis | 717,460 | 44.06% | 0 |
| Independent Populist | David Duke | 18,612 | 1.14% | 0 |
| Libertarian | Ron Paul | 4,115 | 0.25% | 0 |
| New Alliance | Lenora Fulani | 2,355 | 0.14% | 0 |
| Democrats for Economic Recovery | Lyndon LaRouche | 1,958 | 0.12% | 0 |
| Invalid or blank votes | | | | — |
| Totals | | 1,628,202 | 100.00% | 10 |
| Voter turnout | | | | — |

=== Results by parish ===
| Parish | George H.W. Bush Republican | | Michael Dukakis Democratic | | David Duke Independent Populist | | Various candidates Other parties | | Margin | | Total votes cast |
| Parish | # | % | # | % | # | % | # | % | # | % | Total votes cast |
|---|---|---|---|---|---|---|---|---|---|---|---|
| Acadia | 11,279 | 49.21% | 11,359 | 49.56% | 183 | 0.80% | 98 | 0.43% | -80 | -0.35% | 22,919 |
| Allen | 3,674 | 40.87% | 5,204 | 57.89% | 64 | 0.71% | 47 | 0.52% | -1,530 | -17.02% | 8,989 |
| Ascension | 10,726 | 46.15% | 12,147 | 52.27% | 219 | 0.94% | 148 | 0.64% | -1,421 | -6.12% | 23,240 |
| Assumption | 4,017 | 40.19% | 5,610 | 56.13% | 300 | 3.00% | 68 | 0.68% | -1,593 | -15.94% | 9,995 |
| Avoyelles | 7,659 | 49.08% | 7,353 | 47.12% | 466 | 2.99% | 128 | 0.82% | 306 | 1.96% | 15,606 |
| Beauregard | 6,466 | 57.30% | 4,704 | 41.68% | 59 | 0.52% | 56 | 0.50% | 1,762 | 15.62% | 11,285 |
| Bienville | 3,680 | 48.83% | 3,705 | 49.16% | 90 | 1.19% | 62 | 0.82% | -25 | -0.33% | 7,537 |
| Bossier | 20,807 | 69.16% | 9,035 | 30.03% | 135 | 0.45% | 108 | 0.36% | 11,772 | 39.13% | 30,085 |
| Caddo | 54,498 | 57.73% | 39,204 | 41.53% | 363 | 0.38% | 337 | 0.36% | 15,294 | 16.20% | 94,402 |
| Calcasieu | 29,649 | 46.25% | 33,932 | 52.94% | 302 | 0.47% | 217 | 0.34% | -4,283 | -6.69% | 64,100 |
| Caldwell | 2,997 | 65.74% | 1,423 | 31.21% | 118 | 2.59% | 21 | 0.46% | 1,574 | 34.53% | 4,559 |
| Cameron | 1,775 | 43.61% | 2,257 | 55.45% | 18 | 0.44% | 20 | 0.49% | -482 | -11.84% | 4,070 |
| Catahoula | 2,862 | 57.82% | 1,916 | 38.71% | 137 | 2.77% | 35 | 0.71% | 946 | 19.11% | 4,950 |
| Claiborne | 3,756 | 53.60% | 3,158 | 45.07% | 60 | 0.86% | 33 | 0.47% | 598 | 8.53% | 7,007 |
| Concordia | 5,037 | 57.49% | 3,461 | 39.50% | 201 | 2.29% | 62 | 0.71% | 1,576 | 17.99% | 8,761 |
| DeSoto | 5,022 | 47.76% | 5,366 | 51.03% | 82 | 0.78% | 46 | 0.44% | -344 | -3.27% | 10,516 |
| East Baton Rouge | 86,791 | 58.81% | 59,270 | 40.16% | 628 | 0.43% | 895 | 0.61% | 27,521 | 18.65% | 147,584 |
| East Carroll | 1,536 | 44.39% | 1,809 | 52.28% | 88 | 2.54% | 27 | 0.78% | -273 | -7.89% | 3,460 |
| East Feliciana | 3,537 | 48.06% | 3,659 | 49.72% | 99 | 1.35% | 64 | 0.87% | -122 | -1.66% | 7,359 |
| Evangeline | 7,437 | 48.29% | 7,693 | 49.95% | 186 | 1.21% | 84 | 0.55% | -256 | -1.66% | 15,400 |
| Franklin | 5,520 | 62.20% | 3,043 | 34.29% | 262 | 2.95% | 50 | 0.56% | 2,477 | 27.91% | 8,875 |
| Grant | 4,402 | 60.76% | 2,628 | 36.27% | 172 | 2.37% | 43 | 0.59% | 1,774 | 24.49% | 7,245 |
| Iberia | 15,438 | 54.49% | 12,166 | 42.94% | 598 | 2.11% | 129 | 0.46% | 3,272 | 11.55% | 28,331 |
| Iberville | 5,855 | 39.46% | 8,678 | 58.49% | 200 | 1.35% | 103 | 0.69% | -2,823 | -19.03% | 14,836 |
| Jackson | 4,251 | 58.64% | 2,842 | 39.21% | 102 | 1.41% | 54 | 0.74% | 1,409 | 19.43% | 7,249 |
| Jefferson | 110,942 | 66.68% | 53,035 | 31.88% | 1,783 | 1.07% | 612 | 0.37% | 57,907 | 34.80% | 166,372 |
| Jefferson Davis | 5,851 | 45.74% | 6,799 | 53.15% | 80 | 0.63% | 61 | 0.48% | -948 | -7.41% | 12,791 |
| Lafayette | 36,648 | 59.44% | 24,133 | 39.14% | 515 | 0.84% | 362 | 0.59% | 12,515 | 20.30% | 61,658 |
| Lafourche | 16,152 | 50.19% | 15,013 | 46.65% | 841 | 2.61% | 173 | 0.54% | 1,139 | 3.54% | 32,179 |
| LaSalle | 4,559 | 71.69% | 1,622 | 25.51% | 149 | 2.34% | 29 | 0.46% | 2,937 | 46.18% | 6,359 |
| Lincoln | 8,853 | 60.40% | 5,427 | 37.03% | 255 | 1.74% | 122 | 0.83% | 3,426 | 23.37% | 14,657 |
| Livingston | 15,779 | 61.29% | 9,659 | 37.52% | 217 | 0.84% | 88 | 0.34% | 6,120 | 23.77% | 25,743 |
| Madison | 2,334 | 47.53% | 2,416 | 49.20% | 123 | 2.50% | 38 | 0.77% | -82 | -1.67% | 4,911 |
| Morehouse | 7,335 | 60.43% | 4,496 | 37.04% | 251 | 2.07% | 57 | 0.47% | 2,839 | 23.39% | 12,139 |
| Natchitoches | 7,224 | 52.60% | 6,151 | 44.79% | 278 | 2.02% | 80 | 0.58% | 1,073 | 7.81% | 13,733 |
| Orleans | 64,763 | 35.24% | 116,851 | 63.58% | 1,233 | 0.67% | 953 | 0.52% | -52,088 | -28.34% | 183,800 |
| Ouachita | 33,858 | 67.32% | 15,429 | 30.68% | 703 | 1.40% | 302 | 0.60% | 18,429 | 36.64% | 50,292 |
| Plaquemines | 6,084 | 59.11% | 3,997 | 38.83% | 163 | 1.58% | 49 | 0.48% | 2,087 | 20.28% | 10,293 |
| Pointe Coupee | 4,333 | 39.64% | 6,308 | 57.71% | 151 | 1.38% | 138 | 1.26% | -1,975 | -18.07% | 10,930 |
| Rapides | 29,977 | 61.31% | 17,928 | 36.67% | 743 | 1.52% | 243 | 0.50% | 12,049 | 24.64% | 48,891 |
| Red River | 2,266 | 49.41% | 2,254 | 49.15% | 48 | 1.05% | 18 | 0.39% | 12 | 0.26% | 4,586 |
| Richland | 5,226 | 62.85% | 2,833 | 34.07% | 191 | 2.30% | 65 | 0.78% | 2,393 | 28.78% | 8,315 |
| Sabine | 4,767 | 55.81% | 3,532 | 41.35% | 200 | 2.34% | 42 | 0.49% | 1,235 | 14.46% | 8,541 |
| St. Bernard | 19,609 | 61.79% | 11,406 | 35.94% | 598 | 1.88% | 123 | 0.39% | 8,203 | 25.85% | 31,736 |
| St. Charles | 9,685 | 53.82% | 7,973 | 44.31% | 259 | 1.44% | 78 | 0.43% | 1,712 | 9.51% | 17,995 |
| St. Helena | 2,006 | 38.93% | 3,013 | 58.47% | 85 | 1.65% | 49 | 0.95% | -1,007 | -19.54% | 5,153 |
| St. James | 3,799 | 35.44% | 6,707 | 62.57% | 144 | 1.34% | 69 | 0.64% | -2,908 | -27.13% | 10,719 |
| St. John the Baptist | 7,464 | 46.02% | 8,366 | 51.58% | 276 | 1.70% | 113 | 0.70% | -902 | -5.56% | 16,219 |
| St. Landry | 15,790 | 44.53% | 19,091 | 53.84% | 323 | 0.91% | 253 | 0.71% | -3,301 | -9.31% | 35,457 |
| St. Martin | 7,541 | 41.60% | 10,148 | 55.98% | 283 | 1.56% | 157 | 0.87% | -2,607 | -14.38% | 18,129 |
| St. Mary | 11,540 | 51.71% | 10,364 | 46.44% | 295 | 1.32% | 119 | 0.53% | 1,176 | 5.27% | 22,318 |
| St. Tammany | 38,334 | 69.92% | 15,638 | 28.52% | 651 | 1.19% | 200 | 0.36% | 22,696 | 41.40% | 54,823 |
| Tangipahoa | 16,669 | 54.32% | 13,527 | 44.08% | 325 | 1.06% | 167 | 0.54% | 3,142 | 10.24% | 30,688 |
| Tensas | 1,645 | 50.00% | 1,556 | 47.29% | 69 | 2.10% | 20 | 0.61% | 89 | 2.71% | 3,290 |
| Terrebonne | 18,745 | 58.19% | 12,686 | 39.38% | 636 | 1.97% | 145 | 0.45% | 6,059 | 18.81% | 32,212 |
| Union | 5,900 | 62.97% | 3,210 | 34.26% | 199 | 2.12% | 60 | 0.64% | 2,690 | 28.71% | 9,369 |
| Vermilion | 9,224 | 41.99% | 12,180 | 55.45% | 440 | 2.00% | 122 | 0.56% | -2,956 | -13.46% | 21,966 |
| Vernon | 7,453 | 58.40% | 4,998 | 39.17% | 240 | 1.88% | 70 | 0.55% | 2,455 | 19.23% | 12,761 |
| Washington | 9,374 | 51.81% | 8,369 | 46.25% | 260 | 1.44% | 91 | 0.50% | 1,005 | 5.56% | 18,094 |
| Webster | 10,204 | 57.31% | 7,434 | 41.75% | 108 | 0.61% | 59 | 0.33% | 2,770 | 15.56% | 17,805 |
| West Baton Rouge | 3,972 | 45.13% | 4,686 | 53.24% | 81 | 0.92% | 62 | 0.70% | -714 | -8.11% | 8,801 |
| West Carroll | 3,077 | 64.14% | 1,607 | 33.50% | 97 | 2.02% | 16 | 0.33% | 1,470 | 30.64% | 4,797 |
| West Feliciana | 1,854 | 45.34% | 2,146 | 52.48% | 46 | 1.12% | 43 | 1.05% | -292 | -7.14% | 4,089 |
| Winn | 4,165 | 59.02% | 2,699 | 38.25% | 147 | 2.08% | 46 | 0.65% | 1,466 | 20.77% | 7,057 |
| Totals | 883,702 | 54.27% | 717,460 | 44.06% | 18,612 | 1.14% | 8,428 | 0.52% | 166,242 | 10.21% | 1,628,202 |

==== Parishes that flipped from Republican to Democratic ====
- Acadia
- Ascension
- Assumption
- Bienville
- Calcasieu
- Cameron
- DeSoto
- East Feliciana
- Evangeline
- Jefferson Davis
- St. John the Baptist
- St. Landry
- St. Martin
- Vermilion

== See also ==
- United States presidential elections in Louisiana

== Works cited ==
- Black, Earl; Black, Merle (1992). The Vital South: How Presidents Are Elected. Harvard University Press. ISBN 0674941306.
- Hadley, Charles; Stanley, Harold (1989). "Super Tuesday 1988: Regional Results and National Implications". Publius. 19 (3). Oxford University Press: 19–37. JSTOR 3330481.
- Moreland, Laurence; Steed, Robert; Baker, Tod, eds. (1991). The 1988 Presidential Election in the South: Continuity Amidst Change in Southern Party Politics. Praeger Publishers. ISBN 0275931455.
- Steed, Robert; Moreland, Laurence; Baker, Tod, eds. (1994). The 1992 Presidential Election in the South: Current Patterns of Southern Party and Electoral Politics. Praeger Publishers. ISBN 0275945340.
