= 1999 Louisiana's 1st congressional district special election =

- May 1, 1999 (jungle primary); May 29, 1999 (runoff)
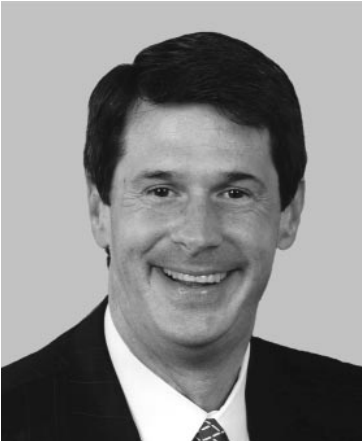

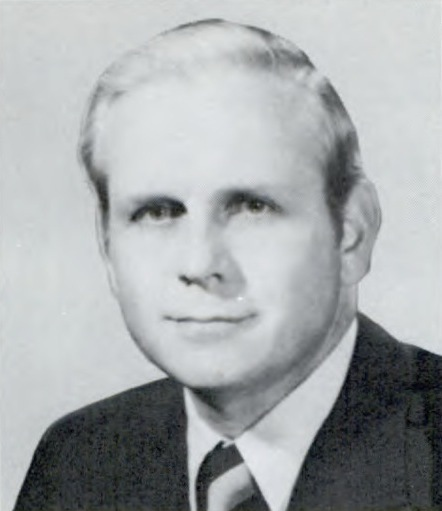
Nominee	David Vitter	Dave Treen	David Duke
Party	Republican	Republican	Republican
First round	31,741; 21.67%	36,719; 25.06%	28,059; 19.15%
Runoff	61,661; 50.75%	59,849; 49.25%	Eliminated
Nominee	Monica Monica	R.H. "Bill" Strain	Rob Couhig
Party	Republican	Democratic	Republican
First round	22,928; 15.65%	16,446; 11.23%	9,295; 6.34%
Runoff	Eliminated	Eliminated	Eliminated

Vitter
20–30%
50–60%
Treen
20–30%
30–40%
50–60%
Duke
20–30%
Strain
20–30%
U.S. Representative before election
Bob Livingston
Republican
Elected U.S. Representative
David Vitter
Republican

The 1999 United States House of Representatives special election in Louisiana's 1st congressional district was held on May 29, 1999, to select the successor to Bob Livingston (R) who resigned due to the discovery of an extramarital affair.

On May 1, nine candidates, mostly Republicans, competed on the same ballot. However, since no candidate was able to achieve a majority, a runoff was held at the end of the month.

Louisiana's 1st congressional district special election jungle primary
Party	Candidate	Votes	%
Republican	David Treen	36,719	25.06%
Republican	David Vitter	31,741	21.67%
Republican	David Duke	28,059	19.15%
Republican	Monica Monica	22,928	15.65%
Democratic	R.H. "Bill" Strain	16,446	11.23%
Republican	Rob Couhig	9,295	6.34%
Democratic	Darryl Ward	720	0.49%
Republican	Patrick Landry	344	0.23%
Republican	S. J. LoCoco	246	0.17%
Total votes		146,498	100%

== Runoff ==
Former State Representative David Vitter narrowly won in the runoff over former Louisiana governor Dave Treen and would later become a United States Senator.

1999 Louisiana's 1st special run-off
Party	Candidate	Votes	%
Republican	David Vitter	61,661	50.75%
Republican	Dave Treen	59,849	49.25%
Total votes		121,510	100%
Republican hold			
