= 1983 Louisiana gubernatorial election =

- October 22, 1983
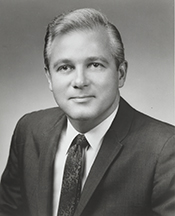

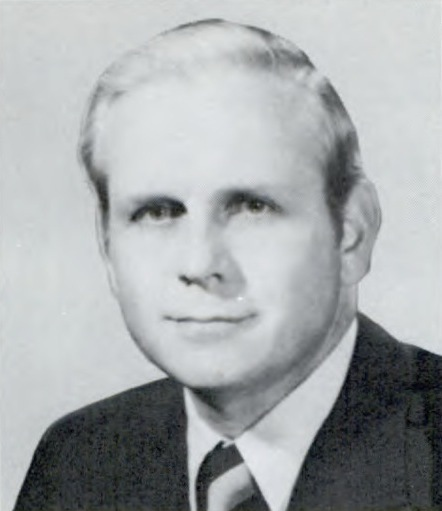
Nominee	Edwin Edwards	Dave Treen
Party	Democratic	Republican
Popular vote	1,002,798	585,692
Percentage	62.31%	36.39%
- Edwards: 40–50% 50–60% 60–70% 70–80% 80–90% 90–100% Treen: 40–50% 50–60% 60–70% 70–80%
Governor before election
Dave Treen
Republican
Elected Governor
Edwin Edwards
Democratic

The 1983 Louisiana gubernatorial election was held to elect the governor of Louisiana. Incumbent Republican governor Dave Treen lost re-election to a second term, defeated by former Democratic governor Edwin Edwards. Edwards became the first governor since Earl Long to win non-consecutive terms. He also became the first to serve three full terms. Edwards and Treen had previously faced off against each other for governor in 1972.

Under Louisiana's jungle primary system, all candidates appear on the same ballot, regardless of party, and voters may vote for any candidate, regardless of their party affiliation. A runoff would be held if no candidate received an absolute majority of the vote during the primary election. On October 12, 1983, Edwards and Treen took the two highest popular vote counts, but a runoff election was not held as Edwards won over 50% of the vote in the primary.

== Background ==
In this election, the first round of voting was held on October 22, 1983. Since Edwards won more than 50% of the votes on the first round, no runoff was needed. The runoff for other statewide offices that required one was November 19, 1983.

Treen became the first of three consecutive Louisiana governors to be denied re-election. Edwards himself was defeated by north Louisiana U.S. representative Buddy Roemer in 1987, refusing to contest the runoff after trailing Roemer in the primary. Edwards came back in 1991, and along with former Ku Klux Klan leader David Duke, combined to oust Roemer in the primary before Edwards routed Duke in the runoff to win a fourth gubernatorial term.

This was the first time that any contestant for the governorship in Louisiana received at least one million votes. Edwards also won 62 out of 64 parishes against Treen. Treen only carried Jefferson Parish, where he resided at the time (and represented in the U.S. House prior to his election as governor); and St. Tammany Parish, where he would eventually move following completion of his term.

== Results ==
Louisiana gubernatorial election, 1983
Party	Candidate	Votes	%
Democratic	Edwin Edwards	1,002,798	62.31%
Republican	David Treen (incumbent)	585,692	36.39%
Republican	Robert M. Ross	7,777	0.48%
Democratic	Ken "Cousin Ken" Lewis	4,117	0.26%
Independent	Charley Moore	2,381	0.15%
Democratic	Floyd Smith	2,264	0.14%
Independent	Michele A. Smith	2,253	0.14%
Independent	Joseph Thomas Robino, Jr.	1,038	0.06%
Democratic	Michael J. Musmeci, Sr.	1,032	0.06%
Total votes		1,609,352	100%
Democratic gain from Republican			

== Videos ==
(1) Gubernatorial Debate on September 7, 1983

(2) Gubernatorial Debate on September 14, 1983

(3) Election Special from LPB on October 21, 1983, detailing in-depth report on the statewide primary elections

(4) Edwin Edwards Campaign Commercial "Edwin Edwards....Now"

(5) Profile of Edwin Edwards from WWL-TV New Orleans on October 22, 1983

(6) Edwards Victory Speech after winning landslide re-election to third term on WWL-TV New Orleans on October 22, 1983

(7) LPB Coverage on the Primary Recap from October 28, 1983
