= 1987 Louisiana gubernatorial election =

- October 24, 1987 (first round)
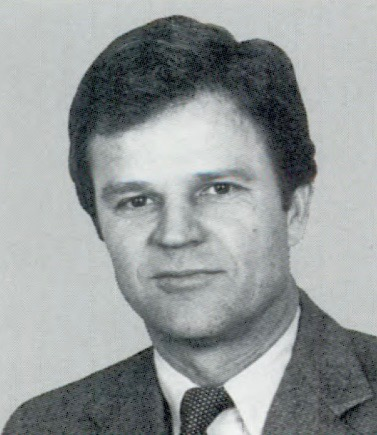

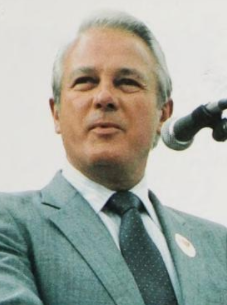

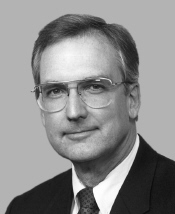

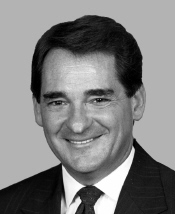
Candidate	Buddy Roemer	Edwin Edwards	Bob Livingston
Party	Democratic	Democratic	Republican
First round	516,078; 33.11%	437,801; 28.09%	287,780; 18.46%
Runoff	Winner by default	Withdrew	Eliminated
Candidate	Billy Tauzin	James H. "Jim" Brown
Party	Democratic	Democratic
First round	154,079; 9.88%	138,223; 8.87%
Runoff	Eliminated	Eliminated
- Roemer: 20–30% 30–40% 40–50% 50–60% 60–70% 70–80% Edwards: 20–30% 30–40% 40–50% Livingston: 30–40% 40–50% Tauzin: 20–30% 30–40% 50–60%
Governor before election
Edwin Edwards
Democratic
Elected Governor
Buddy Roemer
Democratic

The 1987 Louisiana gubernatorial election was held to elect the governor of Louisiana. Three-term incumbent Democratic governor Edwin Edwards withdrew from re-election to a fourth term, granting victory to Democratic congressman Buddy Roemer.

Edwin Edwards defeated Governor Dave Treen in the 1983 election. Edwards was prosecuted as governor by U.S. District Attorney John Volz for selling hospital certificates, but the first trial results in a hung jury before Edwards was acquitted.

Under Louisiana's jungle primary system, all candidates appear on the same ballot, regardless of party, and voters may vote for any candidate, regardless of their party affiliation. On October 24, 1987, Roemer and Edwards took the two highest popular vote counts. As neither took over 50% a runoff was scheduled, but Edwards withdrew, causing the runoff's cancellation.

== Primary election ==
=== Campaign ===
The Times-Picayune/The Times-Picayune and other newspapers endorsed Roemer four weeks prior to the primary. He was initially fifth in polling behind Edwards and Livingston, but rose to placing first in the primary. Edwards withdrew from the election prior to the runoff.

Livingston only placed first in three parishes which were all within his congressional district. Republican areas, such as Caddo Parish, instead supported Roemer.

=== Results ===
First voting round, October 24

1987 Louisiana gubernatorial election
Party	Candidate	Votes	%
Democratic	Buddy Roemer	516,078	33.11
Democratic	Edwin Edwards (incumbent)	437,801	28.09
Republican	Robert "Bob" Livingston	287,780	18.46
Democratic	Billy Tauzin	154,079	9.88
Democratic	James H. "Jim" Brown	138,223	8.87
Democratic	Speedy O. Long	18,738	1.20
Democratic	Earl J. Amedee	3,767	0.24
Democratic	Ken "Cousin Ken" Lewis	2,264	0.15
Total		1,558,730	100.00
Democratic hold			

Runoff did not occur due to Edwards withdrawing

== Works cited ==
- Moreland, Laurence; Steed, Robert; Baker, Tod, eds. (1991). The 1988 Presidential Election in the South: Continuity Amidst Change in Southern Party Politics. Praeger Publishers. ISBN 0275931455.

== Sources ==
State of Louisiana. Primary and General Election Returns, 1987.
