= Billy Tauzin =

American politician (born 1943)

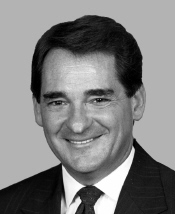
- Official portrait, 1990s

Chair of the House Energy Committee
- In office January 3, 2001 – February 4, 2004
- Preceded by: Tom Bliley
- Succeeded by: Joe Barton

Member of the U.S. House of Representatives from Louisiana's 3rd district
- In office May 22, 1980 – January 3, 2005
- Preceded by: David Treen
- Succeeded by: Charlie Melançon

Member of the Louisiana House of Representatives
- In office 1973–1980

Personal details
- Born: Wilbert Joseph Tauzin II; June 14, 1943 (age 83) Chackbay, Louisiana, U.S.
- Party: Democratic (before 1995); Republican (1995–present)
- Spouse(s): Gayle Clement; Cecile Bergeron
- Education: Nicholls State University (BA); Louisiana State University (JD)
- Tauzin's voice Tauzin on the Do-Not-Call Implementation Act. Recorded February 12, 2003

Wilbert Joseph Tauzin II (/ˈtoʊzæ̃/; born June 14, 1943) is an American lobbyist and politician. He served as the president and CEO of the Pharmaceutical Research and Manufacturers of America (PhRMA), a pharmaceutical company lobby group, from 2005 to 2010.

After serving four terms in the State House, Tauzin won a special election to the United States House of Representatives, and served from 1980 to 2005. He was consistently re-elected as a Democrat representing Louisiana's 3rd congressional district until 1995, when he joined the Republican Party and continued to be re-elected to his seat for another decade.

== Personal life ==
Of Cajun descent, Wilbert Joseph Tauzin II is a lifelong resident of Chackbay, a small town just outside Thibodaux. He graduated from Nicholls State University in 1964 with a Bachelor of Arts Degree, where he was a member of Tau Kappa Epsilon fraternity, and earned a J.D. degree from Louisiana State University in 1967. While attending law school, he served as a legislative aide in the Louisiana State Senate.

Wilbert Joseph Tauzin II is married to Cecile Tauzin and has five children from a previous marriage.

== Political career ==
Tauzin began his elective career in 1972 when he was elected to the Louisiana House of Representatives, serving four full terms as a Democratic Rep. In his first term, he served alongside fellow Democrats Dick Guidry and Leonard J. Chabert.

In 1979, David C. Treen, the U.S. representative from Louisiana's 3rd congressional district, was elected as the state's first Republican governor in more than a century. He had served as the first Republican representative from Louisiana since Reconstruction.

Treen resigned his House seat on March 10, 1980. Tauzin won a special election for the seat on May 17 and was sworn into office on May 22, just five months after winning a fifth term in the state house. He won the congressional race by seven points, defeating Democratic State Senator Anthony Guarisco Jr., of Morgan City and Jim Donelon, of Jefferson Parish, who had left the Democratic Party for the Republican one.

Tauzin won a full term in November 1980, with 85 percent of the vote against minimal opposition. For 15 years, he was known as one of the more conservative Democrats in the House of Representatives. Even though he eventually rose to become an assistant majority whip, he felt shut out by some of his more liberal colleagues and sometimes had to ask the Republicans for floor time. When the Democrats lost control of the House after the 1994 elections, Tauzin was one of the co-founders of the House Blue Dog Coalition, a group of moderate-to-conservative Democrats.

In 1987, Tauzin ran for governor of Louisiana but lost to colleague Buddy Roemer, also a Congressman. The incumbent, Edwin Edwards, had a weakened second-place showing and withdrew from a runoff election. Others in the race were Republican U.S. Representative Bob Livingston of the New Orleans suburbs and two other Democrats: former U.S. Representative Speedy Long and Louisiana Secretary of State James H. "Jim" Brown.

Finally on August 8, 1995, Tauzin himself became a Republican, claiming that conservatives were no longer welcome in the Democratic Party. He soon became a deputy majority whip. He was the first representative to have been part of the leadership of each party in the House. Regardless of party, Tauzin remained popular at home. After 1980, he was re-elected twelve more times without major-party opposition; the first nine times he was completely unopposed.

Tauzin served as chairman of the Energy and Commerce Committee from 2001 to February 4, 2004, when he announced that he would not run for a 13th full term. He has five children from his first marriage and backed his son, Billy Tauzin III, as his replacement. He appeared in ads that were criticized for blurring the lines on which man was actually running for Congress. In spite of his father's support, the younger Tauzin was defeated by 569 votes by a Democrat, Charlie Melancon.

During his tenure, Wilbert Joseph Tauzin II left his mark on issues ranging from natural gas, airline, trucking, and electricity deregulation to the Clean Air Act, Superfund, and the Telecommunications Act of 1996. In addition, he was an original author of the Private Securities Litigation Reform Act and the Cable Act, both of which became law despite a Presidential veto.

In 2003, he was inducted into the Louisiana Political Museum and Hall of Fame in Winnfield.

== Lobbyist ==
In January 2005, the day after his term in Congress ended, he began work as the head of the Pharmaceutical Research and Manufacturers of America (PhRMA). a powerful trade group for pharmaceutical companies. Tauzin was hired at a salary outsiders estimated at $2 million a year. Five years later, he announced his retirement from the association (as of the end of June 2010).

Two months before resigning as chair of the U.S. House Committee on Energy and Commerce, which oversees the drug industry, Tauzin had played a key role in shepherding through Congress the Medicare Prescription Drug Bill. Democrats said that the bill was "a give-away to the drugmakers" because it prohibited the government from negotiating lower drug prices and bans the importation of identical cheaper drugs from Canada and elsewhere.

The Veterans Affairs agency, which can negotiate drug prices, pays much less than Medicare. The bill was passed in an unusual congressional session at 3 a.m. under strong pressure from the drug companies.

As head of PhRMA, Tauzin was a key figure in 2009 health care reform negotiations that produced pharmaceutical industry support for White House and Senate efforts.

Tauzin received $11.6 million from PhRMA in 2010, making him the highest-paid health law lobbyist. Since 2005, Tauzin has been on the Board of Directors at LHC Group.

== Controversies ==
=== Jerome Schneider ===
Tauzin endorsed Jerome Schneider's book The Complete Guide to Offshore Money Havens by dubbing the book, "A serious contender for the best book on offshore banking I've ever seen." Tauzin also spoke at one of Schneider's tax conferences. After Schneider pleaded guilty in 2004 to assisting hundreds of people to avoid taxes through sham offshore banks, a spokesperson for Tauzin called his endorsement "a stupid mistake."

=== Connections to pharmaceutical industry ===
In his capacity as chair of the House Committee on Energy and Commerce, Tauzin "was one of the chief architects of the Medicare bill". Tauzin's appointment shortly afterward (the day after retiring from Congress) as chief lobbyist for the Pharmaceutical Research and Manufacturers of America (PhRMA), the trade association and lobby group for the drug industry, drew criticism from the consumer advocacy group Public Citizen, which claimed that Tauzin "may have been negotiating for the lobbying job while writing the Medicare legislation".

It's a sad commentary on politics in Washington that a member of Congress who pushed through a major piece of legislation benefiting the drug industry, gets the job leading that industry.

— Public Citizen President Joan Claybrook, 2004

The Obama–Biden 2008 election campaign criticised Tauzin and other like-minded politicians.

== See also ==
- List of American politicians who switched parties in office
- List of United States representatives who switched parties

U.S. House of Representatives
Preceded by David C. Treen	Member of the U.S. House of Representatives from Louisiana's 3rd congressional district 1980–2005	Succeeded by Charlie Melancon
Preceded by Tom Bliley	Chair of the House Energy Committee; 2001–2004	Succeeded by Joe Barton
U.S. order of precedence (ceremonial)
Preceded by Jim Moran as Former U.S. Representative	Order of precedence of the United States as Former U.S. Representative	Succeeded by Jerry Costello as Former U.S. Representative
