= Bob Livingston =

American politician and lobbyist (born 1943)

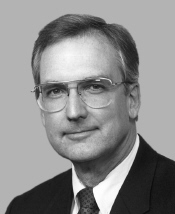

Chair of the House Appropriations Committee
- In office January 4, 1995 – January 3, 1999
- Preceded by: Dave Obey
- Succeeded by: Bill Young

Member of the U.S. House of Representatives from Louisiana's 1st district
- In office August 27, 1977 – March 1, 1999
- Preceded by: Richard A. Tonry
- Succeeded by: David Vitter

Personal details
- Born: Robert Linlithgow Livingston Jr. April 30, 1943 (age 83) Colorado Springs, Colorado, U.S.
- Party: Republican
- Spouse: Bonnie Robichaux (m. 1965)
- Children: 4
- Relatives: Livingston family
- Education: Tulane University (BA, JD)

Military service
- Allegiance: United States
- Branch/service: United States Navy
- Years of service: 1961–1963 (active); 1963–1967 (reserve)
- Livingston's voice Livingston on the day's legislative schedule and fast track trade authority. Recorded October 22, 1997

Robert Linlithgow Livingston Jr. (born April 30, 1943) is an American lobbyist and politician who served as a U.S. representative from Louisiana from 1977 to 1999. A Republican, he was chosen as Newt Gingrich's successor as Speaker of the U.S. House of Representatives, a position he declined following revelations of an extramarital affair. He served as a U.S. representative from Louisiana from 1977 to 1999 and as the chairman of the Appropriations Committee from 1995 to 1999. During his final year in Congress, Livingston was a supporter of Bill Clinton's impeachment. He is currently a Washington, D.C.–based lobbyist. Livingston's memoir, The Windmill Chaser: Triumphs and Less in American Politics, was published in September 2018. and a sequel: The Rainbow Chaser: The Man Who Gambled for Success and Broke Even, published in 2026.

== Family ==
Livingston was born in Colorado Springs, Colorado. He is a descendant of the Livingston family of New York, whose members include Philip, a signer of the United States Declaration of Independence; Chancellor Robert R. Livingston, a co-author of the Declaration and author of the Louisiana Purchase; his younger brother, Edward, Aide de Camp and later Secretary of State to President Andrew Jackson, and who had earlier in his career held the same Congressional seat (La-1) as Bob Livingston. Livingston is a direct descendant of Henry Livingston, who was probably the (then anonymous) author of the poem, The Night Before Christmas,and French Admiral François Joseph Paul de Grasse, who together with General George Washington cornered and defeated British General Cornwallis in the Siege of Yorktown, Virginia, thereby concluding the American Revolutionary War. De Grasse's daughter, Sylvie, married Henry Walter Livingston, ancestors of the Congressman.

Livingston was married in 1965 to the former Bonnie Robichaux (also born 1943), a native of Raceland in Lafourche Parish. Bonnie's grandfather, Alcide Robichaux, served in the Louisiana State Senate, and her uncle, Philip Robichaux, was Lafourche Parish coroner for decades. Livingston's father, a Roman Catholic, and his mother, an Episcopalian, were divorced when Livingston and his sister were quite young. Raised first as Roman Catholic and later as an Episcopalian, he returned to his wife's religion, Roman Catholicism, in later years. The Livingstons have three biological sons, Robert, Richard and David, and an adopted daughter, SuShan a/k/a Susie. They have eight grandchildren. In July 2006, their son Richard was electrocuted by a live wire while trimming a tree damaged by Hurricane Katrina in New Orleans.

== Early career ==
As an undergraduate at Tulane University, he was a member of Delta Kappa Epsilon fraternity. Graduating from Tulane University Law School in 1968, Livingston joined the law practice of David C. Treen, who would become Louisiana's first Republican congressman and governor since Reconstruction. Treen had been an active Republican in the days when the party barely existed in Louisiana, and this connection allowed Livingston to make valuable contacts in GOP circles. He was a delegate to all Republican conventions between 1976 and 2000. Between 1970 and 1976, Livingston worked for U.S. Attorney for the Louisiana's Eastern District Gerald J. Gallinghouse, Orleans Parish District Attorney Harry Connick Sr., and Louisiana State Attorney General, William J. "Billy" Guste Jr.

== US Representative ==
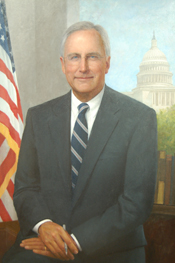
Official Congressional portrait of Bob Livingston.

Livingston resigned his position as head of the state attorney general's organized crime unit in 1976 when he won the Republican nomination for Louisiana's 1st Congressional District, encompassing roughly half of New Orleans and many of its surrounding suburbs. The seat, which had been trending Republican for some time at the national level, had opened up when 36-year incumbent Democrat and former House Armed Services Committee chairman F. Edward Hébert retired. Livingston narrowly lost to one-term state legislator Richard Tonry of Chalmette in St. Bernard Parish. Livingston was denied victory when a third-party candidate, former Sixth District Congressman John Rarick, formerly of St. Francisville in West Feliciana Parish, filed as an independent in the last days of the race. Rarick, who had been one of the most conservative Democrats in Congress during his tenure, siphoned off roughly 9% of the votes cast, enabling Tonry to win with a plurality.

Allegations, however, surfaced of "tombstone" votes for Tonry in both the primary and general election. Tonry was forced to resign in May 1977 and run again in the special election for his seat. However, he lost the Democratic nomination in August to State Representative Ron Faucheux. While Faucheux may have been hindered by a split in the Democratic vote due to Sanford Krasnoff, who ran as an Independent challenger from the left, Livingston won the seat with a majority, 51%, of the votes cast (56,121 votes to Faucheux's 40,862, and Krasnoff's 12,665), becoming the first Republican to represent a significant portion of New Orleans in Congress since Reconstruction. Faucheux later lost an attempt to unseat New Orleans Mayor Dutch Morial in 1982, and was named Secretary of Commerce by Governor Edwin Washington Edwards in 1984.

Livingston was aided by a cadre of dedicated Republican volunteers, including the newly installed National Committeewoman Virginia Martinez of Kenner. In 1978, Livingston won a full term with 86 percent of the vote. He was reelected eleven times, dropping below 80 percent of the vote only once, in 1992. He was completely unopposed in 1986, 1996 and 1998. His district became even more Republican after the 1980 census, when most of the district's share of New Orleans was shifted to the 2nd District. It was replaced with some heavily Republican territory in Jefferson Parish. After the 1990 census, Livingston's district gained conservative Washington and Tangipahoa parishes from the 6th district while relinquishing equally conservative Saint Bernard and Plaquemines to the 3rd district.

Although well known in Louisiana, Livingston was a relatively low-key congressman for his first eighteen years in Washington. However, early in his career, he landed a spot on the powerful Appropriations Committee. This, together with his conservative stances on most issues, made him popular with his constituents, most of whom had never been previously represented by a Republican.

=== Chairman, House Appropriations Committee ===
Livingston first came to national attention in 1995, when he was named chairman of the Appropriations Committee after the Republican takeover of the House. This instantly made him one of the most powerful members of Congress. During one committee session, he brandished an alligator skinning knife, a Bowie knife, and a machete to demonstrate his seriousness as a budget-cutter.

During the Monica Lewinsky scandals, Livingston was one of many Republicans who demanded President Bill Clinton's resignation, and later impeachment, for perjury. After Newt Gingrich announced that he would resign as Speaker (in part because of Republican losses in the 1998 elections, and in part because of revelations of an extramarital affair with a congressional employee 23 years his junior), majority leader Dick Armey and majority whip Tom DeLay had opted not to contest the Speaker's chair. Livingston subsequently announced that he was not only running for Speaker, but had lined up enough support to win. He was nominated as the Republican candidate for Speaker without opposition, and as the GOP had retained a narrow majority in the House, this effectively made him Speaker-elect. Although the Speaker is formally elected by the entire House, in practice the majority party's candidate is all but assured of winning that vote.

=== Resignation ===
In 1998, Hustler Magazine publisher Larry Flynt offered up to $1 million for anyone providing tips about unflattering sexual stories regarding members of Congress or high government officials. Livingston learned late on the night of December 15, 1998—just days before the full House of Representatives was about to begin debating the impeachment of President Clinton—that Flynt had been in contact with at least one woman with whom he had had an extramarital affair. Two days later, December 17, 1998, in a closed-door evening conference of his House Republican colleagues, Livingston said, "I very much regret having to tell you that I've been Flynted!" The same day, Flynt released a press release saying he was investigating tips about four alleged affairs Livingston had had. Two days later, on December 19, 1998, during the final impeachment debates in the House of Representatives, Livingston reiterated his call for Clinton to resign. Saying that he could only make this call "if I am willing to heed my own words," he announced that he would not only stand down as Republican candidate for Speaker, but would leave the House as well. He announced that he would resign his House seat "approximately six months into the 106th Congress." (Privately, Livingston told colleagues that, if had he sought the speakership, it would have been more difficult for the House Republicans to carry out their agenda.) In a subsequent speech, hurriedly written after consultation with the White House, Minority Leader Dick Gephardt of Missouri proclaimed "We need to stop destroying imperfect people at the altar of an unobtainable morality", and praised Livingston and encouraged members to applaud him, which they did, giving the Louisianan standing ovations. Gephardt had previously urged Livingston to reconsider his resignation, having pledged not to make an issue of the extramarital affair if he became Speaker.

Following Livingston's announcement of his resignation, House Republicans settled on Chief Deputy Whip Dennis Hastert (who would later be convicted of crimes relating to sexually abusing minors) to succeed Gingrich as Speaker of the House—a decision Livingston would later describe, in memoirs published in 2018, as "a disaster." Years later, Livingston recalled giving Hastert "a foot-thick binder" filled with notes intended to help him become a successful Speaker, "and if he read any part of the thing, I'd be surprised."

Livingston resigned from the House on March 1, 1999, two months into his 13th term.

== Gubernatorial race ==
In 1985, Livingston had called for the resignation of Governor Edwin Edwards, who faced indictment and trial on charges of racketeering and fraud. "He shouldn't continue to drag the image of our state down with his legal problems," Livingston said of Edwards.

In 1987, Livingston ran for governor himself and declared, "You can lay our problems at the hands of politicians." He questioned the state's poor performance regarding school drop-outs, unemployment, and credit rating. He even noted that Louisiana had a high number of cancer patients, a factor that was often attributed to environmental hazards. Livingston continued:

I'm prepared to clean house.... The rest of the nation has the impression that Louisiana doesn't want to work... that Louisiana will tolerate corruption... that Louisiana is not serious about improving its quality of life....

Despite polls that had generally showed that Livingston would face the incumbent governor, Edwin Edwards, in a second round of balloting, Livingston finished third of the nine candidates. Because of a last-week surge to his fellow U.S. representative, Buddy Roemer of Louisiana's 4th congressional district, Livingston fell ten points short of a runoff berth. Roemer was slated into a runoff election officially the Louisiana general election. Two other major candidates finished behind Livingston: the Democratic (later Republican) representative Billy Tauzin of Louisiana's 3rd congressional district and the outgoing Secretary of State James H. "Jim" Brown.

Despite his showing in the gubernatorial race, Livingston remained popular in his district and went on to win easy re-elections as he moved up the leadership ladder in the House.

== Lobbyist ==
Since resigning from Congress, Livingston has worked as a lobbyist.

=== Livingston Group ===
Soon after retiring from public life he founded The Livingston Group, a lobbying group in Washington, D.C. Some of their noted accomplishments include Congressional approval of a Morocco–United States Free Trade Agreement and Congressional normalization of relations between the US and Libya following the Libyan abdication of nuclear technology and settlement of claims by family members for people killed in Pan Am Flight 103 and other violent incidents in the 1980s.

==== Clients ====
The Livingston Group's clients have included Citigroup, the United States Chamber of Commerce, and Verizon Communications. Another important client was the Republic of Turkey, on whose behalf the Group lobbied until March 2008. Critics contend that this lobbying was a form of genocide denial, as Turkey does not recognize the slaughter of up to approximately one million Armenians as a genocide, and does not want the American Government to recognize these events as genocide either.

The Livingston Group has also represented the government of Egypt until March 2012. Acting as lobbyist for Egypt Livingston "helped stall a Senate bill that called on Egypt to curtail human rights abuses" in 2010. His stated role is to enhance relations between the United States and the Republic of Egypt, which he perceives as critical to a resolution of tension in the Middle East.

=== Trump–Ukraine scandal ===
Livingston emerged as a "behind-the-scenes player" in the impeachment inquiry against President Trump, apparently having urged a Trump administration official to oust the U.S. ambassador to Ukraine. On October 30, 2019, U.S. State Department employee Catherine Croft noted in her opening statement to the congressional committees conducting the impeachment inquiry against Donald Trump:

During my time at the NSC, I received multiple calls from lobbyist Robert Livingston, who told me that Ambassador Yovanovitch should be fired. He characterized Ambassador Yovanovitch as an "Obama holdover" and associated with George Soros. It was not clear to me at that time-or now-at whose direction or at what expense Mr. Livingston was seeking the removal of Ambassador Yovanovitch.

== Other activities ==
Livingston declared his support for Donald Trump in March 2016, comparing him to Ronald Reagan.

In 2003, Livingston was inducted into the Louisiana Political Museum and Hall of Fame in Winnfield.

Livingston testified in the 2009 trial of Mose Jefferson, who was convicted on four counts related to bribery. In response to a comparison made by James Gill between Livingston and former U.S. representative William J. Jefferson (convicted of 11 felonies), Livingston defended the Livingston Group as having no relation to Jefferson's activities, but rather to the extent that they may have represented the same client, performed their own services in an entirely legal manner.

From 2011 to 2014, Livingston became Treasurer of the Louisiana Republican Party. Livingston said taking the fundraising assignment for the Louisiana GOP would not in any way undermine the work of The Livingston Group.

Livingston was a member of the board of the International Foundation for Electoral Systems, a non-profit involved in international elections, and he is a Knight of the Sovereign Military Order of Malta. He is currently a member of the Advisory Board of the New Orleans Metropolitan Crime Commission and the New Orleans Branch of the Salvation Army.

Livingston has authored two books: The Windmill Chaser; Triumph and Less in American Politics (University of Louisiana Press, 2018) and The Rainbow Chaser; The Man Who Gambled for Success and Broke Even (Humanixbooks.com, 2026)

== See also ==
- List of federal political sex scandals in the United States

U.S. House of Representatives
Preceded by Rick Tonry	Member of the House of Representatives from Louisiana's 1st congressional district 1977–1999	Succeeded by David Vitter
Preceded by Dave Obey	Chair of the House Appropriations Committee; 1995–1999	Succeeded by Bill Young
New office	Chair of the House Ethics Reform Task Force; 1997; Served alongside: Ben Cardin	Position abolished
Party political offices
Preceded by Dave Treen	Republican nominee for Governor of Louisiana; 1987	Succeeded by David Duke
U.S. order of precedence (ceremonial)
Preceded by Tony P. Hall as Former U.S. Representative	Order of precedence of the United States as Former U.S. Representative	Succeeded by Gene Taylor as Former U.S. Representative
