= Buddy Roemer =

American politician (1943–2021)

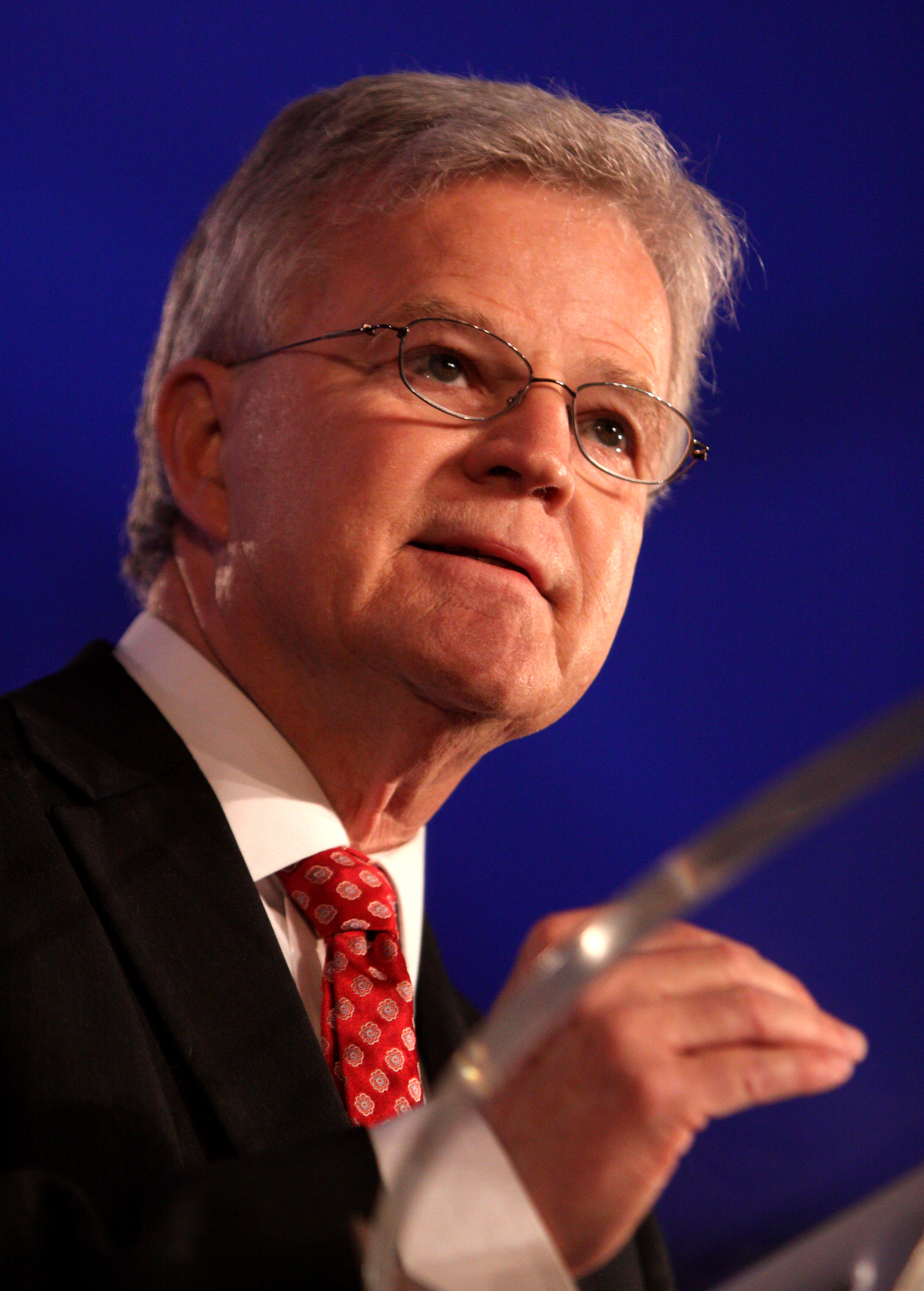
- Roemer in 2011

52nd Governor of Louisiana
- In office March 14, 1988 – January 13, 1992
- Lieutenant: Paul Hardy
- Preceded by: Edwin Edwards
- Succeeded by: Edwin Edwards

Member of the U.S. House of Representatives from Louisiana's 4th district
- In office January 3, 1981 – March 14, 1988
- Preceded by: Buddy Leach
- Succeeded by: Jim McCrery

Personal details
- Born: Charles Elson Roemer III; October 4, 1943 Shreveport, Louisiana, U.S.
- Died: May 17, 2021 (aged 77) Baton Rouge, Louisiana, U.S.
- Party: Democratic (before 1991); Republican (1991–2012, 2013–2021); Reform (2012–2013)
- Spouses: Cookie Demler (m. 1962; div. 1981) Patti Crocker (m. 1981; div. 2000) Scarlett Roemer (m. 2000)
- Children: 3
- Relatives: Charles E. Roemer II (father)
- Education: Harvard University (BA, MBA)

Charles Elson "Buddy" Roemer III (October 4, 1943 – May 17, 2021) was an American politician, investor, and banker who served as the 52nd governor of Louisiana from 1988 to 1992, and as a member of the United States House of Representatives from 1981 to 1988. In March 1991, while serving as governor, Roemer switched affiliation from the Democratic Party to the Republican Party.

Roemer was a candidate for the presidential nominations of the Republican Party and the Reform Party in 2012. He withdrew from those contests and sought the 2012 Americans Elect presidential nomination until that group announced it would not field a candidate in 2012 because no candidate reached the required minimum threshold of support to be listed on its ballot. Roemer eventually endorsed Libertarian Gary Johnson, former governor of New Mexico, for president in the 2012 general election.

Roemer served on the Advisory Council of Represent.Us, a nonpartisan anti-corruption organization.

== Early life, education, and early career ==
Buddy Roemer was born on October 4, 1943, in Shreveport, the son of Charles Elson "Budgie" Roemer, II (1923–2012) and the former Adeline McDade (1923–2016).

Roemer was reared on the family's Scopena plantation near Bossier City. He attended public schools and graduated in 1960 as valedictorian of Bossier High School. In 1964, he graduated from Harvard University with a Bachelor of Arts degree in economics. In 1967, he received an MBA in finance from Harvard Business School.

Following college, Roemer returned to Louisiana to work in his father's computer business and later founded two banks. He was elected in 1972 as a delegate to the Louisiana Constitutional Convention held in 1973.

== U.S. House of Representatives ==
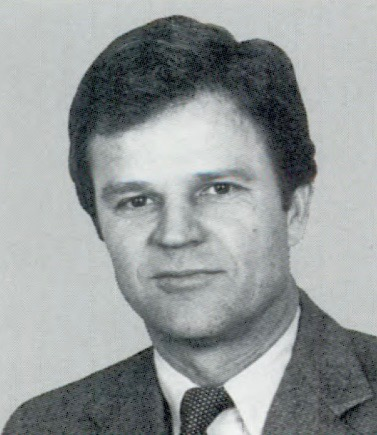
Roemer during his tenure in Congress

As a member of Congress, Roemer represented Louisiana's 4th congressional district in the northwestern section of the state, which includes Shreveport and Bossier City.

=== Elections ===
In 1978, Roemer ran in the nonpartisan blanket primary for the 4th district congressional seat, which was vacated by popular incumbent Joe Waggonner, also from Bossier Parish. Waggonner announced his opposition to Roemer after Roemer criticized the excessive costs of the Red River navigation program, which Waggoner favored. Roemer finished third in the primary, 1,708 votes behind Democratic State Representative Buddy Leach, with Republican Jimmy Wilson, a former state representative from Vivian in northern Caddo Parish, in second. Leach went on to defeat Wilson by 266 votes in a disputed general election.

In 1980, Roemer and Wilson again challenged Leach in the primary; also running was State Senator Foster Campbell of Bossier Parish. In another close race, Wilson finished in third place, Roemer ranked second, and Leach led the field with 29 percent. In the general election, with the support of Wilson, Roemer handily defeated Leach, who had the support of Campbell, many other state legislators, and former Governor Edwards, 64 to 36 percent.

After his 1980 election victory, Roemer won re-election without opposition in 1982, 1984, and 1986.

=== Tenure ===
In Congress, Roemer frequently supported Ronald Reagan's policy initiatives and fought with the Democratic congressional leadership, though he remained in the party. He also criticized then Democratic House leader Tip O'Neill of Massachusetts for being "too liberal", and was in turn characterized by Speaker O'Neill as being "often wrong but never in doubt".

After Roemer left the House to become governor, he was succeeded by his administrative assistant, Republican Jim McCrery.

In 1981, Roemer joined forty-seven other House Democrats in supporting the passage of the Reagan tax cuts, strongly opposed by Speaker O'Neill and Roemer's fellow Louisiana Democrat Gillis William Long of Alexandria.

In 1984, Roemer again broke with O'Neill to support Reagan's request for U.S. aid to El Salvador, which Roemer described as "a freedom-loving country." Roemer was among the congressional observers in the El Salvador national election.

In 1988, Roemer claimed that Democratic presidential nominee Michael Dukakis made "a much better choice in terms of politics and impact on Louisiana" in choosing U.S. Senator Lloyd Bentsen of Texas for his vice presidential running mate than did Republican George H. W. Bush made in choosing Senator Dan Quayle of Indiana. Roemer, as the host governor and still a Democrat, welcomed the Republicans to New Orleans, where delegates at the Republican National Convention nominated Bush and Quayle.

=== Committee assignments ===
In his first term in Congress, Roemer was denied a seat on the Banking Committee by the Democratic leadership and instead was assigned to the Public Works and Transportation Committee due to Roemer having voted with the Republican minority on extending the debate on House rules proposed by the Democratic majority. He was a member of the "boll weevils" and the Conservative Democratic Forum.

== Governor of Louisiana ==
=== 1987 gubernatorial election ===
Roemer was one of a large number of Democratic candidates to challenge three-term incumbent governor Edwin Edwards, whose flamboyant personality and reputation for questionable ethical practices had polarized voters. Other candidates challenging Edwards in the primary were U.S. Representatives Bob Livingston, a suburban New Orleans Republican, and Billy Tauzin, a Democrat from Lafourche Parish. Outgoing Secretary of State James H. "Jim" Brown, a lawyer from Ferriday in Concordia Parish, also challenged Edwards.

While Edwards faced a wide field, Roemer's candidacy had a poignant aspect. His father, Charles E. Roemer II, had been Edwards' top aide and campaign manager during Edwards' first term as governor. In the 1972 campaign, Buddy Roemer had claimed that Edwards as governor "will listen to the people and to public officials who represent the people before acting on any problems in the state." In 1981, Roemer's father had gone to prison on conviction of selling state insurance contracts. During the election he was advised by Gordon Hensley.

Roemer launched a fiery campaign against Edwards, calling for a "Roemer Revolution", where he would "scrub the budget", overhaul the education system, reform campaign finance rules, and slash the state bureaucracy by "bricking up the top three floors of the Education Building." Perhaps the key moment in the 1987 race came at a forum among the candidates. As usual, the main topic of discussion was Edwin Edwards. His challengers were asked, in succession, if they would consider endorsing Edwards in the general election if they didn't make it to the runoff. The candidates hedged, particularly Secretary of State Jim Brown. The last candidate to speak was Roemer: "No, we've got to slay the dragon. I would endorse anyone but Edwards." The next day, as political commentator John Maginnis put it, Brown was explaining his statement while Roemer was ordering "Slay the Dragon" buttons. Boosted by his endorsement as the 'good government candidate' by nearly every newspaper in the state, Roemer stormed from last place in the polls and on election night, overtook Edwards and placed first in the primary election, with 33 percent of the vote compared with Edwards' 28 percent.

Edwards, recognizing he faced certain defeat, made the surprise announcement on election night that he would concede the race to Roemer. By withdrawing, Edwards denied Roemer the opportunity to build a governing coalition in the general election race, thus denying him a decisive majority victory. The defeated Edwards virtually ceded control of the state to Roemer even before the inauguration.

=== Tenure as governor ===
Roemer entered the governor's office on March 14, 1988. In April 1988, under executive order, Roemer named William Hawthorn Lynch, a long-term investigative journalist who at the time was with the Baton Rouge bureau of the New Orleans Times-Picayune, as the state's first inspector general. Lynch was empowered to investigate corruption, governmental inefficiencies, and misuse of state equipment. He remained in that position until his death in 2004.

In October 1989, voters rejected a number of Roemer tax initiatives but approved a State constitutional amendment for transportation improvements.

Facing a $1.3 billion deficit in the state budget, his first job was eliminating the deficit. Roemer's first chief of staff, Len Sanderson, Jr., who had been a journalist with the Alexandria Daily Town Talk, had run Roemer's gubernatorial campaign and was a close confidant. He represented the reform-minded agenda that had redefined Louisiana politics during Roemer's first session. According to Ron Gomez, Roemer's secretary of natural resources and a former legislator from Lafayette, the LSU-educated Sanderson "with his blond hair spilling to below shoulder length, stepped on so many toes and got into so many faces that he didn't make it into the second year." After another interim appointment, Roemer named former State Representative P.J. Mills of Shreveport as chief of staff, to, in the words of Gomez, "bring some maturity and experience to the office." Roemer also hired the political consultant and pollster Elliott Stonecipher of Shreveport.

State Representative Bruce M. Bolin of Minden, later a state district court judge, supported Roemer's early reform efforts: "the state can't be everything to everybody, and the new budget reflects that." Bolin also correctly predicted that Roemer would in time run for president, but Roemer did not seek the White House for another twenty-four years. To make a presidential run, Bolin said that Roemer "needs no political baggage" and that Louisiana "must be viewed as a progressive state" for him to be able to accomplish that goal. Edward J. Steimel, executive director of the pro-business lobby, the Louisiana Association of Business and Industry, also applauded Roemer's early reform efforts. Business, said Steimel, achieved half of its goals in the 1988 legislative session. Another session of equal outcome, he added, could make the state competitive with its neighbors within a year.

The Cross bill sought to ban abortion in cases of rape and incest and imposed fines of up to $100,000 and ten years imprisonment on the practitioners. Roemer declared the legislation incompatible with the United States Supreme Court decision Roe v. Wade. His veto alienated large numbers of his socially conservative electoral base. The legislature subsequently overrode Roemer's veto with an even larger margin than in the original bill. State Representative Woody Jenkins of Baton Rouge, one of the leading abortion foes in the legislature, said the prohibition regarding rape and incest is needed to prevent women from filing false claims in such matters. State Senator Sydney Nelson said that he opposed the abortion ban because of the problems of unwanted children and defective births. Nevertheless, in 1991, United States District Judge Adrian G. Duplantier of New Orleans, a former state senator, ruled that the measure was in conflict with Roe v. Wade and the 1991 companion ruling Planned Parenthood of Pennsylvania v. Casey.

Roemer came under fire for hiring a friend to teach positive thinking to his staff. Staffers were asked to wear rubber bands on their wrists and were told to snap a band whenever they had negative thoughts.

=== 1991 party switch ===
In March 1991, Roemer switched to the Republican Party just months before the state elections, apparently at the urging of Bush White House Chief of Staff John H. Sununu. Roemer, as a new Democratic governor, had appeared at the 1988 Republican Convention in New Orleans to greet the delegates. The convention was held in New Orleans through the urging of longtime Louisiana Republican National Committeewoman Virginia Martinez, who had worked for Livingston in the previous campaign. She was also the chairman of the 1988 Host Committee.

Roemer's late-term party switch dismayed as many Republican politicians and activists as it did Democrats. One irate Republican was the state party chairman, Billy Nungesser of New Orleans. Failing to get the Louisiana Republicans' endorsement convention canceled, Roemer skipped the event. The convention, as expected, endorsed U.S. Representative Clyde C. Holloway, the favored candidate of the anti-abortion forces in the state, with whom Roemer was at odds at the time.

=== 1991 gubernatorial election ===
The 1991 gubernatorial contest included Roemer, Edwin Edwards, David Duke, and Eighth District Congressman Clyde Holloway of Forest Hill, who all ran in Louisiana's open primary. Roemer was wounded by his mistakes as governor, while Edwards and Duke each had a passionate core group of supporters. Roemer placed third in the primary. One of the contributing factors to Roemer's defeat in the 1991 primary was a last-minute advertising barrage by Marine Shale owner Jack Kent. Marine Shale had been targeted by the Roemer administration as a polluter. Kent spent $500,000 of his own money in the closing days of the campaign to purchase anti-Roemer commercials.

As Roemer left the governorship, he predicted that his "unheralded" accomplishments would become obvious in the fourth Edwards term. According to Roemer, a key factor in his defeat for a second term was his alienation of special interests.

== Post-gubernatorial career ==
Immediately after leaving office as governor, Roemer taught a course in economics for the spring semester 1992 at his alma mater, Harvard University.

=== 1995 gubernatorial election ===
In 1995, Roemer attempted a political comeback when he again ran for governor. Having been squeezed out in 1991 between Edwards and Duke, Roemer chose to run on a much more conservative platform in 1995, emphasizing an anti-crime and anti-welfare stance. For example, he called for prisoner chain gangs to clean up litter on state highways. Roemer held a wide lead for much of the campaign, but faded in the days before the primary election as State Senator Mike Foster, who switched affiliation from Democratic to Republican during the campaign, took conservative votes away from him. As a result, Roemer finished fourth with 18 percent of the vote, two percentage points from making the runoff, called the general election in Louisiana.

=== Later business career ===
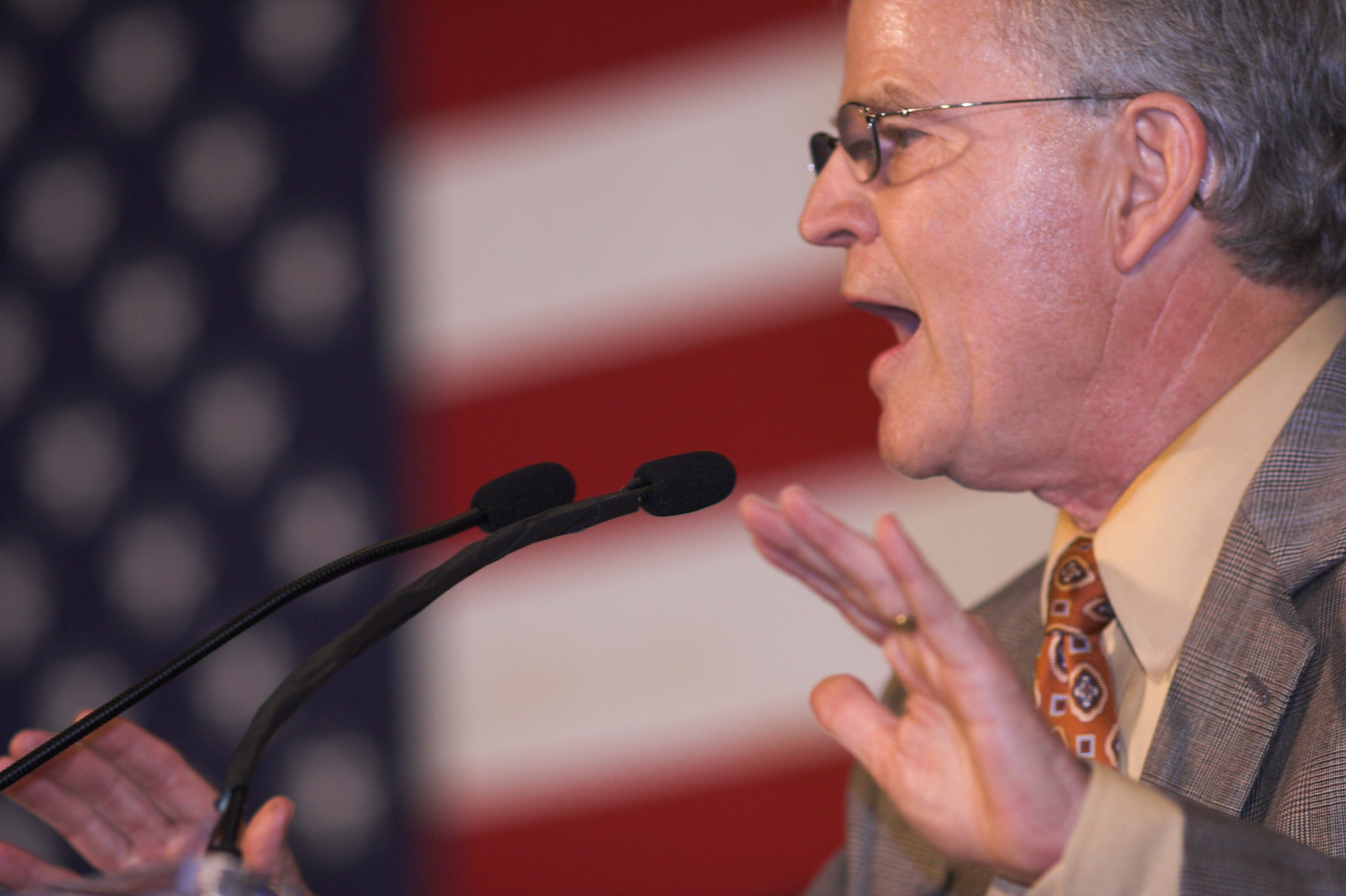
Roemer speaking at a John McCain presidential rally in Louisiana, June 2008

Having met without success at his political comeback, Roemer turned his attention to investing and banking. He formed a company that built retirement housing near universities, with alumni from each university being the target buyers. He also founded Business First Bank, based in Baton Rouge, of which he was the president and CEO, and his daughter-in-law, Heather, is the assistant vice president of human resources.

Ron Gomez (a Lafayette politicist) said that he believes Roemer "could have been one of Louisiana's great governors. The state's horrible financial condition when he took office, his dependence on an inexperienced and sometimes rashly immature staff in his first year or so, an overly-ambitious legislative agenda, and his own unpredictable dealings with individual legislators all contributed to the failures he suffered. Ultimately, all of these factors led to his running third, as the incumbent, in the 1991 gubernatorial election." Gomez describes Roemer as "a dynamic orator who could light up an audience with his first two sentences. When he got wound up it was truly evangelical, and he made sense. His wiry, five foot seven, one-hundred thirty-five pound frame would seem to uncoil and grow as he outlined his vision as a fighter against crime, corruption and waste in government, poor education, taxes and industrial pollution."

In April 2014, Roemer became a partner at The Young Turks, an online progressive news network founded and run by Cenk Uygur. Roemer's firm - Roemer, Robinson, Melville & Co, LLC - invested $4 million into the company. According to Uygur, the two met and bonded over their shared support of campaign finance reform, an issue that both Uygur and Roemer supported and have spoken about extensively for many years.

=== 2012 presidential candidacy ===
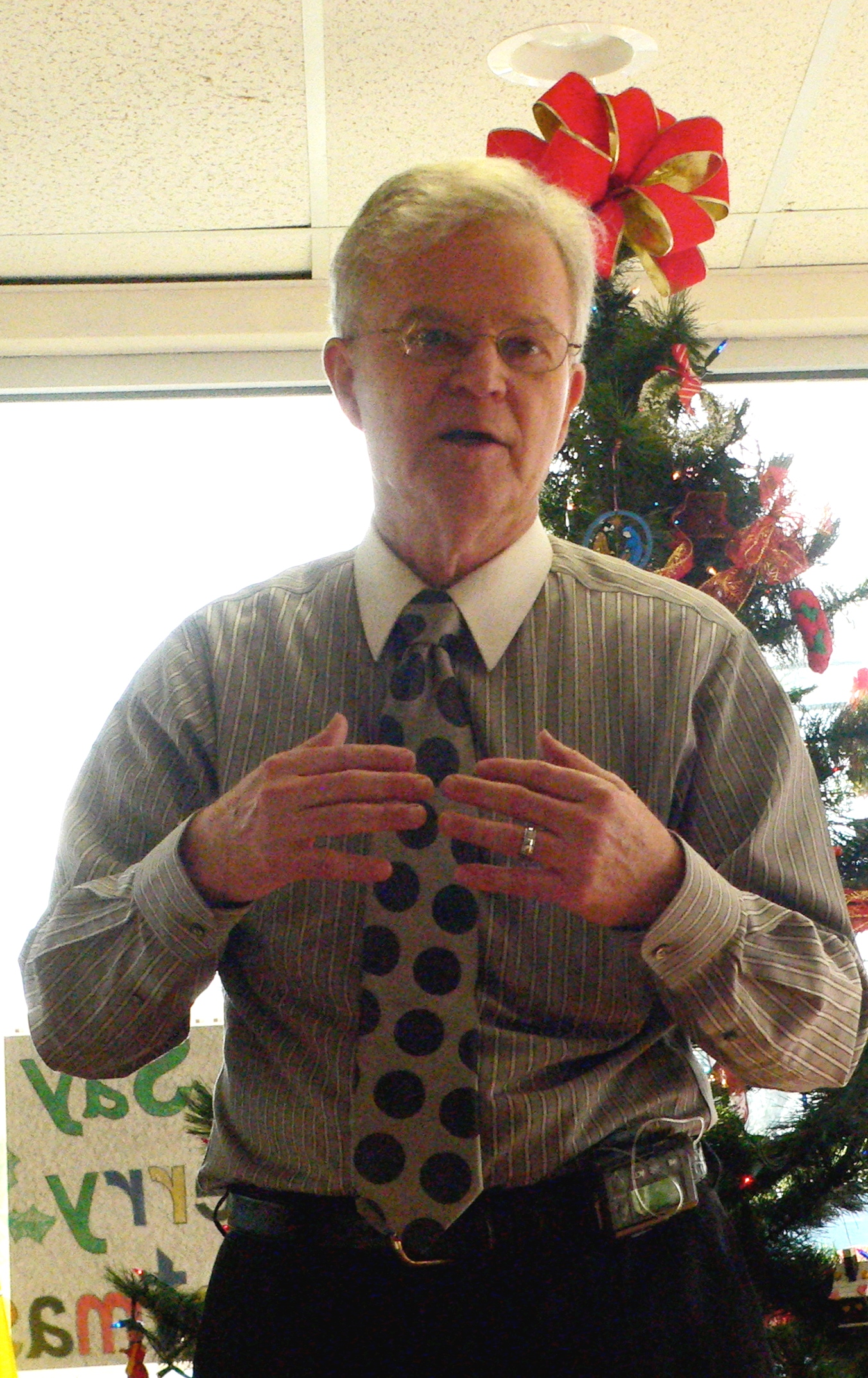
Roemer speaking at a Reform Party campaign in New Jersey, December 2011

In January 2011, Roemer told Baton Rouge television station WAFB that he was considering a bid for the U.S. presidency in 2012.

On March 3, 2011, Roemer announced the formation of an exploratory committee to prepare for a possible run for the 2012 presidential nomination of the Republican Party. Roemer stressed that campaign finance reform would be a key issue in his campaign. Pledging to limit campaign contributions to $100 (~$143.00 in 2025) per individual, Roemer appeared as one of five candidates at a 2011 March forum in Iowa sponsored by the Faith and Freedom Coalition. But he was not invited to any of the Republican debates because he failed to meet the 7 percent minimum criterion for popularity in polls. He was not even included as an option in several polls until the 2012 Iowa Caucus and the 2012 New Hampshire primary in early January. Instead Roemer attempted to reach audiences through social media, including tweeting responses to debates in which he could not participate. His donations averaged $30,000 a month, far below what is raised by the front runners. This difference in campaign fundraising may be attributed to the fact that Roemer limited donations to $100 (~$143.00 in 2025) per U.S. citizen, and denied all PAC, Super PAC, and corporate donations. His campaign garnered some visibility when Roemer starred in an advertisement for Stephen Colbert's Super PAC, in November 2011. The ad lampooned the flimsiness of legal restrictions against Super PACs coordinating with the candidates they support.

- On November 30, 2011, Roemer announced that he would seek the Americans Elect nomination.

On February 23, 2012, Roemer dropped out of the GOP nomination contest to seek the Reform Party's nomination.

On May 17, 2012, Americans Elect announced that it would not run a candidate in the 2012 presidential elections.

On May 31, 2012, Roemer announced that he was ending his 2012 presidential campaign altogether, citing the lack of ballot access in any of the 50 states to be the reason.

Though he had talked of leaving the Republican Party to become an Independent after his presidential bid failed, the Louisiana secretary of state's office reports as of October 24, 2013, and again on February 1, 2016, that Roemer remained a registered Republican in East Baton Rouge Parish.

== Personal life and death ==
Roemer was married three times, with his first two marriages ending in divorce. He had three children: daughter Caroline, and sons Chas and Dakota.

In 1989, Roemer separated from his second wife, the former Patti Crocker, with the divorce final in 1990, after seventeen years of marriage. The couple had one child, Dakota Frost Roemer, a businessman in Baton Rouge, who in 2012 married the former Heather Rae Gatte, daughter of Nacis and Patty Gatte of Iota, Louisiana.

Roemer had a stroke in 2014, which affected his speech. He also had type 1 diabetes. He died at his home in Baton Rouge on May 17, 2021, at age 77.

== See also ==
- List of American politicians who switched parties in office

U.S. House of Representatives
Preceded by Buddy Leach	Member of the House of Representatives from Louisiana's 4th congressional district 1981–1988	Succeeded by Jim McCrery
Party political offices
Preceded by Edwin Edwards	Democratic nominee for Governor of Louisiana; 1987	Succeeded by Edwin Edwards
Political offices
Preceded by Edwin Edwards	Governor of Louisiana; 1988–1992	Succeeded by Edwin Edwards
