= VPHS =

VPHS may refer to:

- Villa Park High School, Villa Park, California, Unit, US
- Ville Platte High School, Ville Platte, Louisiana, US
- Vinzons Pilot High School, Vinzons, Camarines Norte, Philippines
