= Ladislas Lazaro =

American politician (1872–1927)

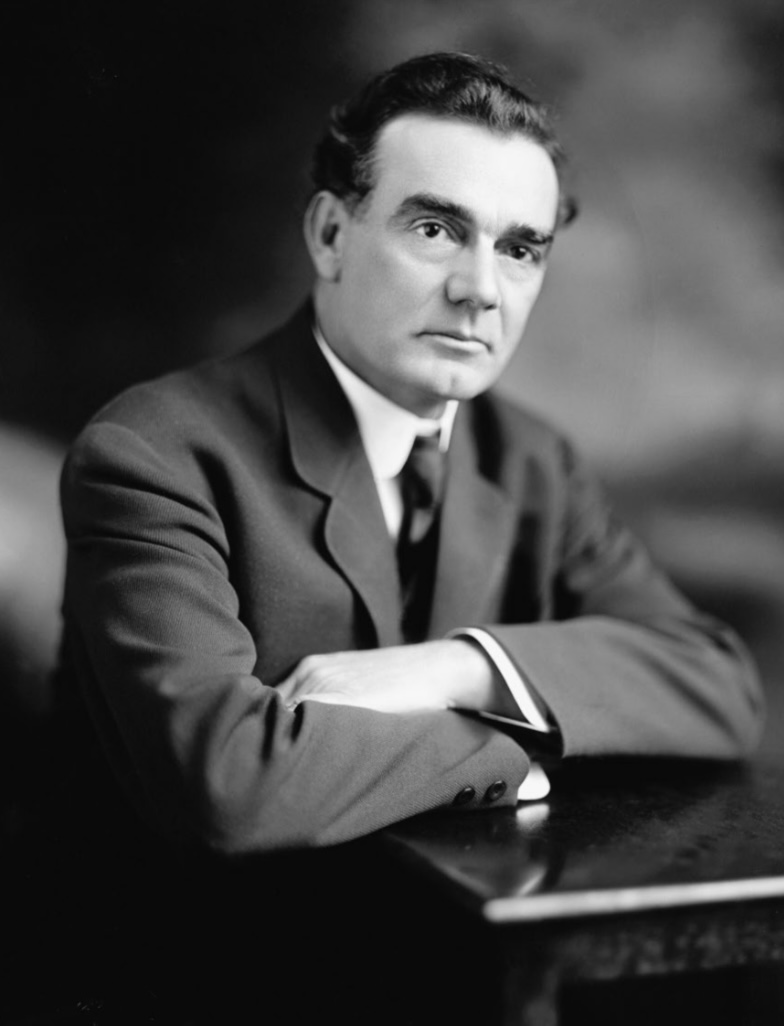

Member of the U.S. House of Representatives from Louisiana's 7th district
- In office March 4, 1913 – March 30, 1927
- Preceded by: Arsène Pujo
- Succeeded by: René L. DeRouen

Member of the Louisiana Senate
- In office 1908-1912

Personal details
- Born: Ladislas Lazaro; June 5, 1872 Ville Platte, Louisiana, U.S.
- Died: March 30, 1927 (aged 54) Washington, D.C., U.S.
- Resting place: Old City Cemetery, Ville Platte, Louisiana, U.S.
- Party: Democratic

Ladislas Lazaro (June 5, 1872 – March 30, 1927) was an American politician who served as a Democratic U.S. Representative from Louisiana's 7th congressional district from 1913 to 1927.

== Biography ==
Born near Ville Platte, Evangeline (then part of St. Landry) Parish, Louisiana, Lazaro was the son of Marie Denise Ortego, a daughter of one of Ville Platte’s founding Hispanic families, and Alexandre Lazaro Biladinoviz, a Romani immigrant from the town of Risan (in what is now Montenegro), who came to America aboard a ship from Russia as a stowaway. Lazaro attended public and private schools and Holy Cross College, New Orleans, Louisiana. He graduated from Louisville (Kentucky) Medical College in 1894 and practiced his profession in Washington, Louisiana, until 1913.

He became interested in agricultural pursuits. He served as president of the parish school board for four years. He also served in the Louisiana State Senate from 1908 to 1912.

=== U.S. House of Representatives ===
Lazaro was elected as a Democrat to the Sixty-third and to the seven succeeding Congresses; he served from March 4, 1913, until his death in Washington, D.C., on March 30, 1927. He became the second Hispanic American ever to chair a standing committee in the U.S. House of Representatives when he was named chairman of the Enrolled Bills Committee in 1915.

=== Death and burial ===
He died while in office in 1927 and was interred in the Old City Cemetery, Ville Platte, Louisiana.

== See also ==
- List of Hispanic and Latino Americans in the United States Congress
- List of members of the United States Congress who died in office (1900–1949)

U.S. House of Representatives
Preceded by Arsène Pujo	Member of the U.S. House of Representatives from Louisiana's 7th congressional district 1913–1927	Succeeded by Vacant
