= Evangeline Bank and Trust Company =

- U.S. National Register of Historic Places
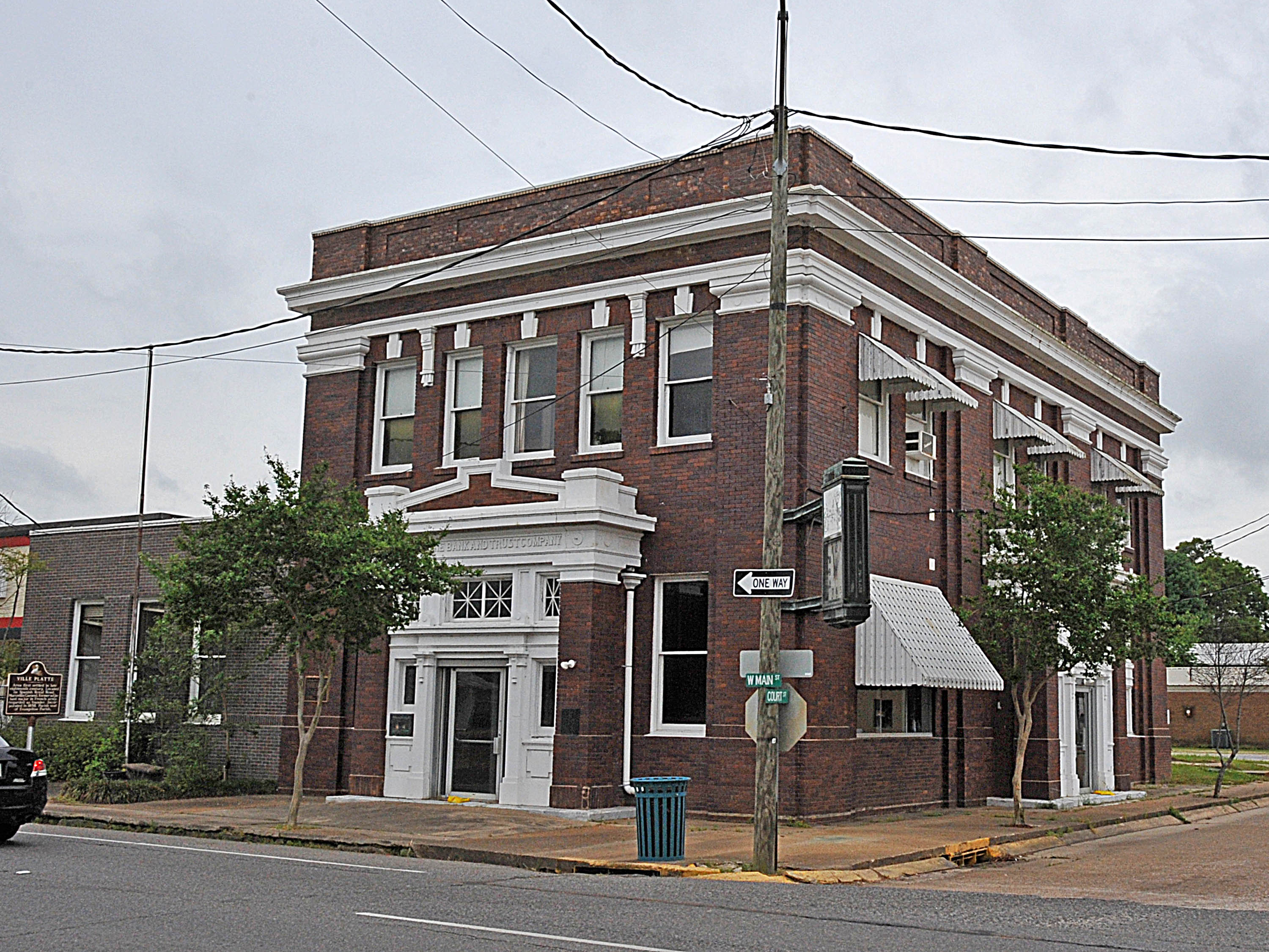

- Location within Louisiana Location within the United States
- Location: 342 West Main Street, Ville Platte, Louisiana
- Coordinates: 30°41′23″N 92°16′40″W
- Area: less than one acre
- Built: 1913
- Architectural style: Classical Revival
- NRHP reference No.: 05000934
- Added to NRHP: September 1, 2005

The Evangeline Bank and Trust Company, also known as Ville Platte City Hall, is a two-story building with elements of Classical Revival style located at 342 West Main Street in Ville Platte in Evangeline Parish, Louisiana.

Built in 1913, it is a masonry building. It was deemed significant "as the town of Ville Platte’s most impressive architectural landmark."

The building was listed on the National Register of Historic Places on September 1, 2005.

== See also ==
- Bank of Ville Platte
- National Register of Historic Places listings in Evangeline Parish, Louisiana
