= Bank of Ville Platte =

- U.S. National Register of Historic Places
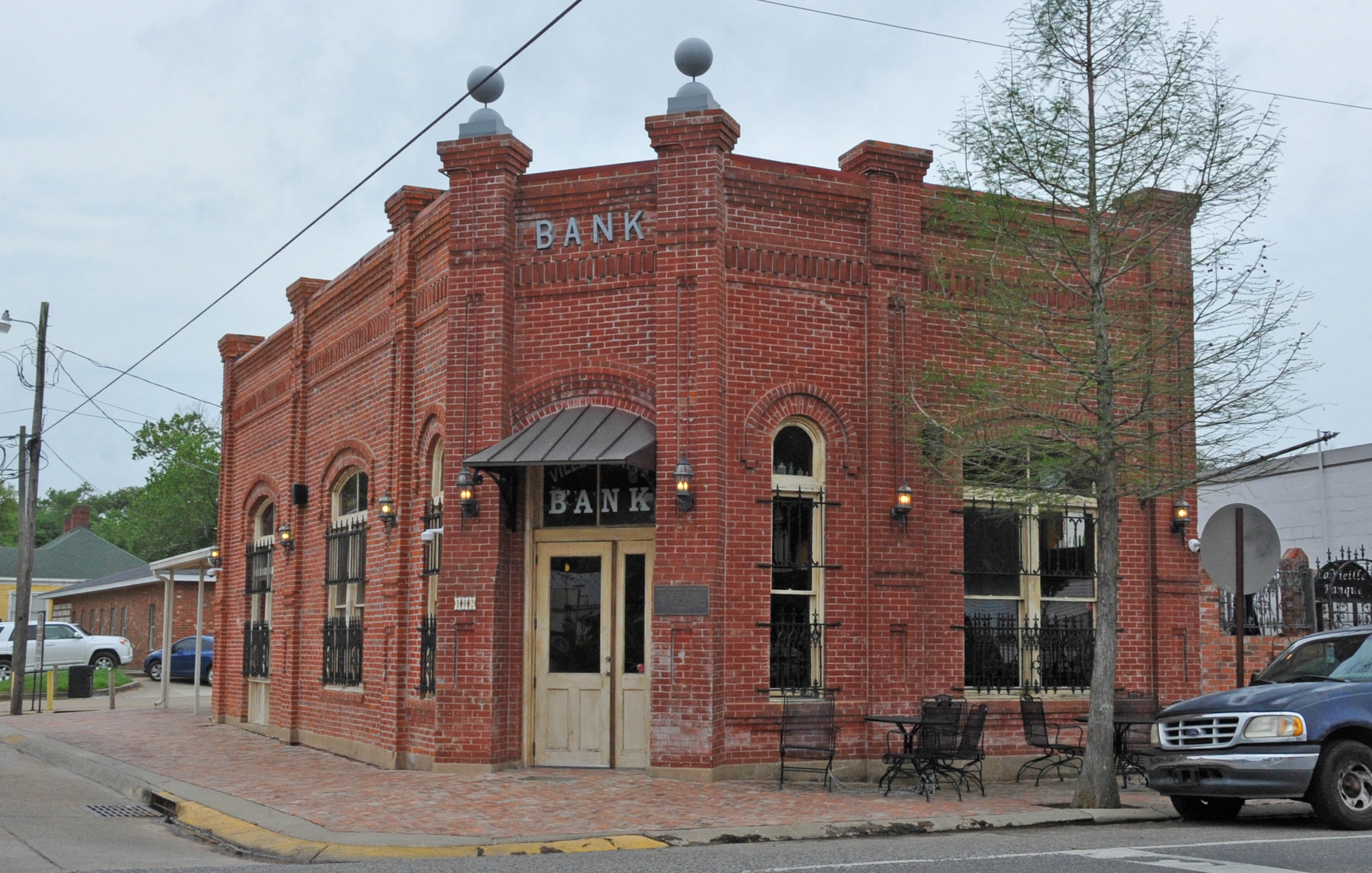

- Location within Louisiana Location within the United States
- Location: 102 West Main Street, Ville Platte, Louisiana
- Coordinates: 30°41′18″N 92°16′28″W
- Area: less than one acre
- Built: 1907
- Built by: Charles Thibodeaux
- Architectural style: Italianate
- NRHP reference No.: 04001469
- Added to NRHP: January 12, 2005

The Bank of Ville Platte, also known as La Banc de la Ville Platte, is a historic bank building located at 102 West Main Street in Ville Platte in Evangeline Parish, Louisiana.

Built in 1907, it is a one-story masonry building prominent on a corner of two main streets in Ville Platte, which became the parish seat when Evangeline Parish separated from St. Landry Parish in 1910. It is designed to face with presentable facades onto both streets. It has Italianate treatments at its windows and doorways.

The building was listed on the National Register of Historic Places on January 12, 2005.

== See also ==
- Evangeline Bank and Trust Company
- National Register of Historic Places listings in Evangeline Parish, Louisiana
