= National Register of Historic Places listings in Evangeline Parish, Louisiana =

Location of Evangeline Parish in Louisiana

This is a list of the National Register of Historic Places listings in Evangeline Parish, Louisiana.

This is intended to be a complete list of the properties on the National Register of Historic Places in Evangeline Parish, Louisiana, United States. The locations of National Register properties for which the latitude and longitude coordinates are included below, may be seen in a map.

There are 5 properties listed on the National Register in the parish. Two properties were once listed, but has since been removed.

This National Park Service list is complete through NPS recent listings posted December 12, 2025.

== Current listings ==
| | Name on the Register | Image | Date listed | Location | City or town | Description |
|---|---|---|---|---|---|---|
| 1 | Bank of Ville Platte | Bank of Ville Platte | January 12, 2005 (#04001469) | 102 West Main Street; 30°41′18″N 92°16′28″W | Ville Platte | |
| 2 | Evangeline Bank and Trust Company | Evangeline Bank and Trust Company | September 1, 2005 (#05000934) | 342 West Main Street; 30°41′23″N 92°16′40″W | Ville Platte | |
| 3 | Jean Marie Laran House | Jean Marie Laran House | January 31, 2008 (#07001486) | 619 East Main Street; 30°41′09″N 92°16′02″W | Ville Platte | Also known as the Maison Jean Marie Laran Museum. |
| 4 | Tate House | Tate House | June 3, 1998 (#98000661) | 1425 LA 29, about 3.9 miles (6.3 km) northeast of Ville Platte; 30°44′09″N 92°14′17″W | Ville Platte vicinity | Also known as Deville House. |
| 5 | Ville Platte Post Office | | June 17, 2025 (#100011956) | 242 West Main Street; 30°41′21″N 92°16′35″W | Ville Platte | |

== Former listings ==
| | Name on the Register | Image | Date listed | Date removed | Location | City or town | Description |
|---|---|---|---|---|---|---|---|
| 1 | Dardeau Building | Dardeau Building | June 1, 1982 (#82002771) | November 29, 2016 | 224 West Main Street; 30°41′21″N 92°16′35″W | Ville Platte | Building demolished some time between 1982 and 2016. |
| 2 | Alexis LaTour House | Alexis LaTour House | September 14, 1987 (#87001492) | June 11, 2015 | 247 East Main Street; 30°41′14″N 92°16′14″W | Ville Platte | House was moved by the owners about 22.3 miles (35.9 km) to the southeast in 1998. It is still standing in Saint Landry Parish at 890 Chretien Point Road, Sunset, Louisiana. |

== See also ==
- List of National Historic Landmarks in Louisiana
- National Register of Historic Places listings in Louisiana
