= Bennett Landreneau =

United States Army general

Bennett C. Landreneau
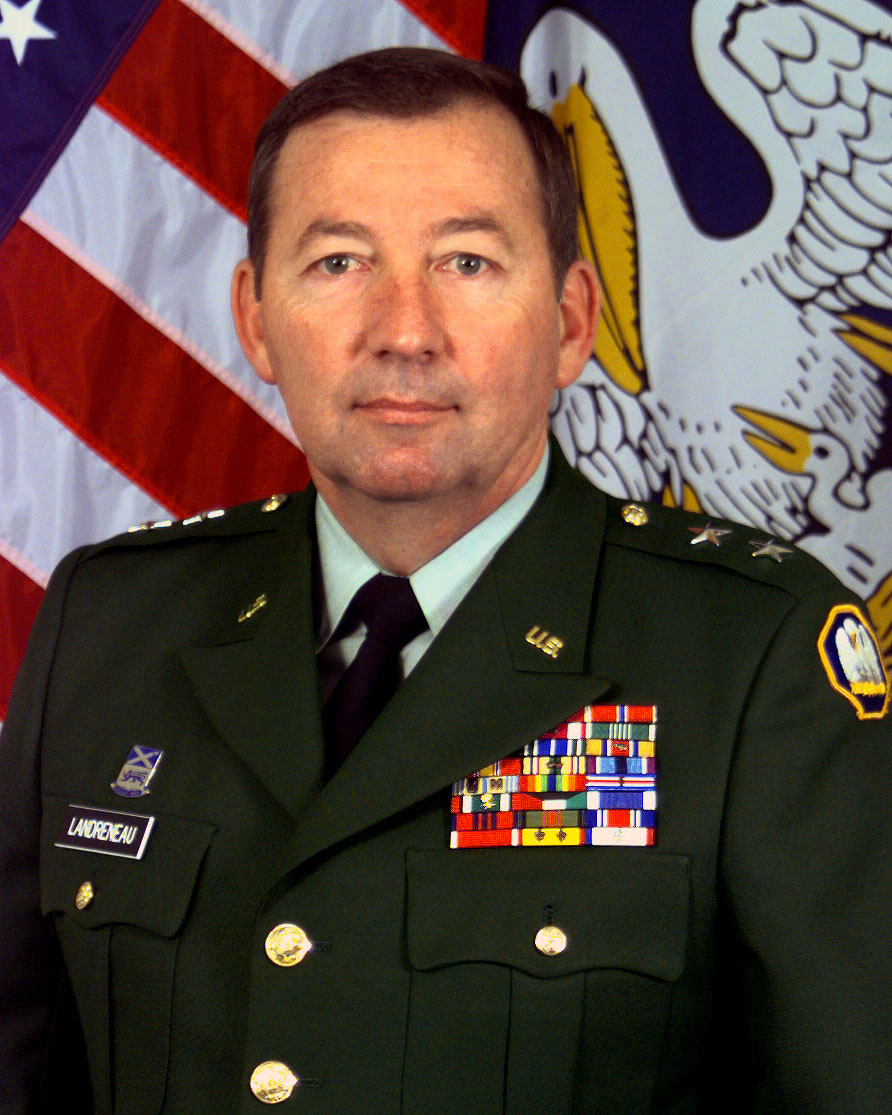
- Landreneau in uniform, 2012
- Born: October 4, 1947 (age 78)
- Allegiance: United States
- Branch: Army National Guard
- Service years: 1969–2011
- Rank: Major General
- Commands: 527th Engineer Battalion; 225th Engineer Brigade; 256th Infantry Brigade; Adjutant General of Louisiana
- Conflicts: Gulf War
- Awards: Legion of Merit (2); Bronze Star Medal; Meritorious Service Medal (2); Army Commendation Medal; Army Achievement Medal
- Education: University of Southwestern Louisiana

Major General Bennett C. Landreneau (born October 4, 1947) is a retired Army National Guard officer who served as the Adjutant General of Louisiana from 1997 to 2011.

== Education ==
Landreneau graduated from Vidrine High School in Ville Platte, Louisiana and holds a Bachelor of Science degree in agronomy from the University of Southwestern Louisiana. In 1995, he graduated from the United States Army War College in Carlisle, Pennsylvania.

== Military career ==
In June 1969, Landreneau enlisted in the Louisiana National Guard as a private. In 1971, he attended Louisiana State Officer Candidate School, where he was issued a commission as a second lieutenant. He served as a platoon leader in the 3671st Maintenance Company (LAARG, Alexandria, Louisiana), and again with Detachment 1 Company C, 769th Engineer Battalion, (LAANG, Jena, Louisiana). In September 1973, he was awarded his first military command with Detachment 1, 2225th Engineer Company, (LAANG, Jena, Louisiana). In October 1978, after commanding the 2225th Engineer Company, Company C, 527th Engineer Battalion, and Company A, 527th Engineer Battalion, he transitioned to staff duties in Operations (S-3). In September 1986, he took command of 527th Engineer Battalion, (LAANG, Bossier City, Louisiana). In December 1990, the Battalion was mustered into the National Guard of the United States under Title 10 of the United States Code, where it deployed to Saudi Arabia in support of Operation Desert Storm. In September 1995, he became the commander of the 256th Infantry Brigade headquartered in Lafayette, Louisiana, where he served for two years before appointment to The Adjutant General headquartered in New Orleans, Louisiana. Landreneau, as a major general, held the position of The Adjutant General of the Louisiana National Guard for fourteen years until Brigadier General Glenn H. Curtis assumed command in November 2011.

=== Military awards ===
- Legion of Merit (with 1 Oak Leaf Cluster)
- Bronze Star Medal
- Meritorious Service Medal (with 1 Oak Leaf Cluster)
- Army Commendation Medal
- Army Achievement Medal
- Army Reserve Components Achievement Medal (with 1 Silver Oak Leaf Cluster)
- National Defense Service Medal
- Southwest Asia Service Medal (with 2 Bronze Service Stars)
- Humanitarian Service Medal
- Armed Forces Reserve Medal (with Hourglass Device and M Device)
- Army Service Ribbon
- Army Reserve Components Overseas Training Ribbon (with Numeral One)
- Kuwait Liberation Medal (Saudi Arabia)
- Kuwait Liberation Medal (Kuwait)

== Personal life ==
Landreneau is married to Dolores (née Fontenot); they have four children and six grandchildren. General Landreneau worked for the United States Department of Agriculture - Natural Resources Conservation Service for over 30 years and retired as the assistant state conservationist in 1996 before appointment to the adjutant general of the Louisiana National Guard. While working with the USDA, he received two USDA Distinguished Service awards and one USDA Superior Service award.
