= Louisiana's 7th congressional district =

Former congressional district

Coordinates: 30.2147°N 93.2086°W

- Obsolete district
- Created: 1900
- Eliminated: 2010
- Years active: 1903-2013

Louisiana's 7th congressional district was a congressional district in the U.S. state of Louisiana located in the southwestern part of the state. It last contained the cities of Crowley, Eunice, Jennings, Lafayette, Lake Charles, Opelousas, Sulphur and Ville Platte.

The district became obsolete for the 113th Congress in 2013 as Louisiana had lost a seat in the U.S. House of Representatives redistricting based upon results from the 2010 census post Hurricane Katrina population losses in the state. Most of the territory in this district became the 3rd district.

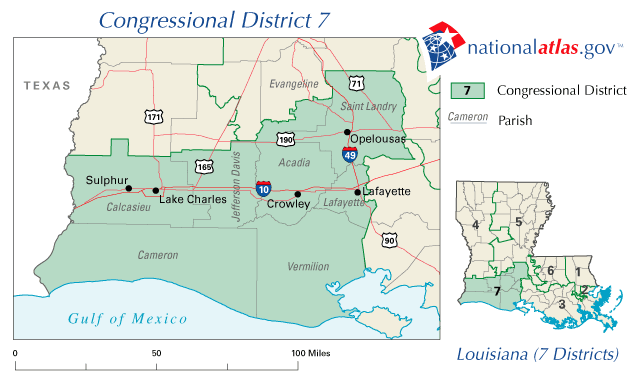
The district in its final form, from 2003 to 2013

== List of members representing the district ==
Member	Party	Years	Cong ress	Electoral history
District created following the 1900 census – March 4, 1903
Arsène Paulin Pujó (Lake Charles)	Democratic	March 4, 1903 – March 3, 1913	58th 59th 60th 61st 62nd	Elected in 1902. Re-elected in 1904. Re-elected in 1906. Re-elected in 1908. Re-elected in 1910. Retired.
Ladislas Lazaro (Washington)	Democratic	March 4, 1913 – March 30, 1927	63rd 64th 65th 66th 67th 68th 69th 70th	Elected in 1912. Re-elected in 1914. Re-elected in 1916. Re-elected in 1918. Re-elected in 1920. Re-elected in 1922. Re-elected in 1924. Re-elected in 1926. Died.
Vacant		March 30, 1927 – August 23, 1927	70th	
René Louis De Rouen (Ville Platte)	Democratic	August 23, 1927 – January 3, 1941	70th 71st 72nd 73rd 74th 75th 76th	Elected to finish Lazaro's term. Re-elected in 1928. Re-elected in 1930. Re-elected in 1932. Re-elected in 1934. Re-elected in 1936. Re-elected in 1938. Retired.
Vance Plauché (Lake Charles)	Democratic	January 3, 1941 – January 3, 1943	77th	Elected in 1940. Retired.
Henry D. Larcade Jr. (Opelousas)	Democratic	January 3, 1943 – January 3, 1953	78th 79th 80th 81st 82nd	Elected in 1942. Re-elected in 1944. Re-elected in 1946. Re-elected in 1948. Re-elected in 1950. Retired.
T. Ashton Thompson (Ville Platte)	Democratic	January 3, 1953 – July 1, 1965	83rd 84th 85th 86th 87th 88th 89th	Elected in 1952. Re-elected in 1954. Re-elected in 1956. Re-elected in 1958. Re-elected in 1960. Re-elected in 1962. Re-elected in 1964. Died.
Vacant		July 1, 1965 – October 2, 1965	89th	
Edwin Edwards (Crowley)	Democratic	October 2, 1965 – May 9, 1972	89th 90th 91st 92nd	Elected to finish Thompson's term. Re-elected in 1966. Re-elected in 1968. Re-elected in 1970. Resigned when elected governor.
Vacant		May 9, 1972 – September 30, 1972	92nd	
John Breaux (Crowley)	Democratic	September 30, 1972 – January 3, 1987	92nd 93rd 94th 95th 96th 97th 98th 99th	Elected to finish Edwards's term. Re-elected in 1972. Re-elected in 1974. Re-elected in 1976. Re-elected in 1978. Re-elected in 1980. Re-elected in 1982. Re-elected in 1984. Retired to run for U.S. senator.
Jimmy Hayes (Lafayette)	Democratic	January 3, 1987 – December 1, 1995	100th 101st 102nd 103rd 104th	Elected in 1986. Re-elected in 1988. Re-elected in 1990. Re-elected in 1992. Re-elected in 1994. Retired to run for U.S. senator.
Jimmy Hayes (Lafayette)	Republican	December 1, 1995 – January 3, 1997	100th 101st 102nd 103rd 104th	Elected in 1986. Re-elected in 1988. Re-elected in 1990. Re-elected in 1992. Re-elected in 1994. Retired to run for U.S. senator.
Chris John (Crowley)	Democratic	January 3, 1997 – January 3, 2005	105th 106th 107th 108th	Elected in 1996. Re-elected in 1998. Re-elected in 2000. Re-elected in 2002. Retired to run for U.S. senator.
Charles Boustany (Lafayette)	Republican	January 3, 2005 – January 3, 2013	109th 110th 111th 112th	Elected in 2004. Re-elected in 2006. Re-elected in 2008. Re-elected in 2010. Redistricted to the 3rd district.
District eliminated following the 2010 census – January 3, 2013

== Recent election results ==
=== 2002 ===
Louisiana's 7th Congressional District runoff election (2002)
Party	Candidate	Votes	%
Democratic	Chris John*	138,659	86.82
Libertarian	Roberto Valletta	21,051	13.18
Total votes		159,710	100.00
Turnout			
Democratic hold			

=== 2004 ===
Louisiana's 7th congressional district general election (2004)
Party	Candidate	Votes	%
Republican	Charles Boustany	105,626	38.61
Democratic	Willie L. Mount	69,040	25.24
Democratic	Don Cravins, Sr.	67,207	24.57
Republican	David Thibodaux	26,497	9.69
Democratic	Malcolm Carriere	5,180	1.89
Total votes		273,550	100.00
Turnout			
Republican gain from Democratic			

Louisiana's 7th Congressional District runoff election (December 4, 2004)
Party	Candidate	Votes	%
Republican	Charles Boustany	75,039	54.96
Democratic	Willie Mount	61,493	45.04
Total votes		136,532	100.00
Turnout			
Republican gain from Democratic			

=== 2006 ===
Louisiana's 7th congressional district election (2006)
Party	Candidate	Votes	%
Republican	Charles Boustany*	113,720	70.70
Democratic	Mike Stagg	47,133	29.30
Total votes		160,853	100.00
Turnout			
Republican hold			

=== 2008 ===
Louisiana's 7th congressional district election (2008)
Party	Candidate	Votes	%
Republican	Charles Boustany*	177,173	61.88
Democratic	Don Cravins, Jr.	98,280	34.33
Independent	Peter Vidrine	10,846	3.79
Total votes		286,299	100.00
Turnout			
Republican hold			

=== 2010 ===
Louisiana's 7th congressional district election (2010)
Party	Candidate	Votes	%
Republican	Charles Boustany*		100.00
Total votes			100.00
Turnout			
Republican hold			
