= Howard A. Duncan =

American politician

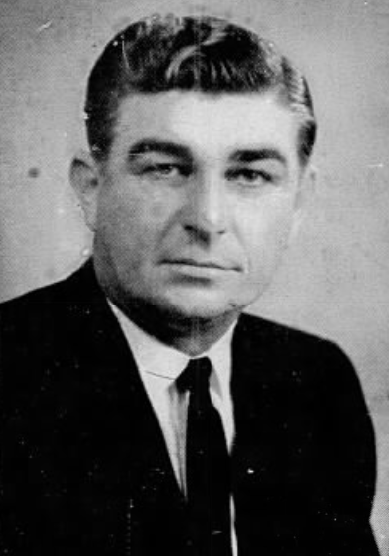
- Duncan in 1966

Member of the Louisiana State Senate from the 35th district
- In office 1966–1968
- Preceded by: Edwin Edwards

Personal details
- Born: Howard Allen Duncan; November 23, 1927 Acadia Parish, Louisiana, U.S.
- Died: June 19, 2004 (aged 76) Crowley, Louisiana, U.S.
- Party: Democratic

Howard Allen Duncan (November 23, 1927 – June 19, 2004) was an American politician. A member of the Democratic Party, he served in the Louisiana State Senate from 1966 to 1968.

== Life and career ==
Duncan was born in Acadia Parish, Louisiana, the son of Robert Clinton and Mabel Duncan. He served in the United States Army during the Korean conflict. After his discharge, he worked as a councilman in Crowley, Louisiana.

Duncan served in the Louisiana State Senate from 1966 to 1968. During his service in the Senate, in 1966, he and Louisiana representative Allen C. Gremillion authored a bill that provided state funds to build the Southwest Louisiana Developmental Center, a residential treatment facility for intellectually disabled children.

== Death ==
Duncan died on June 19, 2004, at the Southwind Nursing Center in Crowley, Louisiana, at the age of 76.
