= Danny Ardoin =

American baseball player (born 1974)

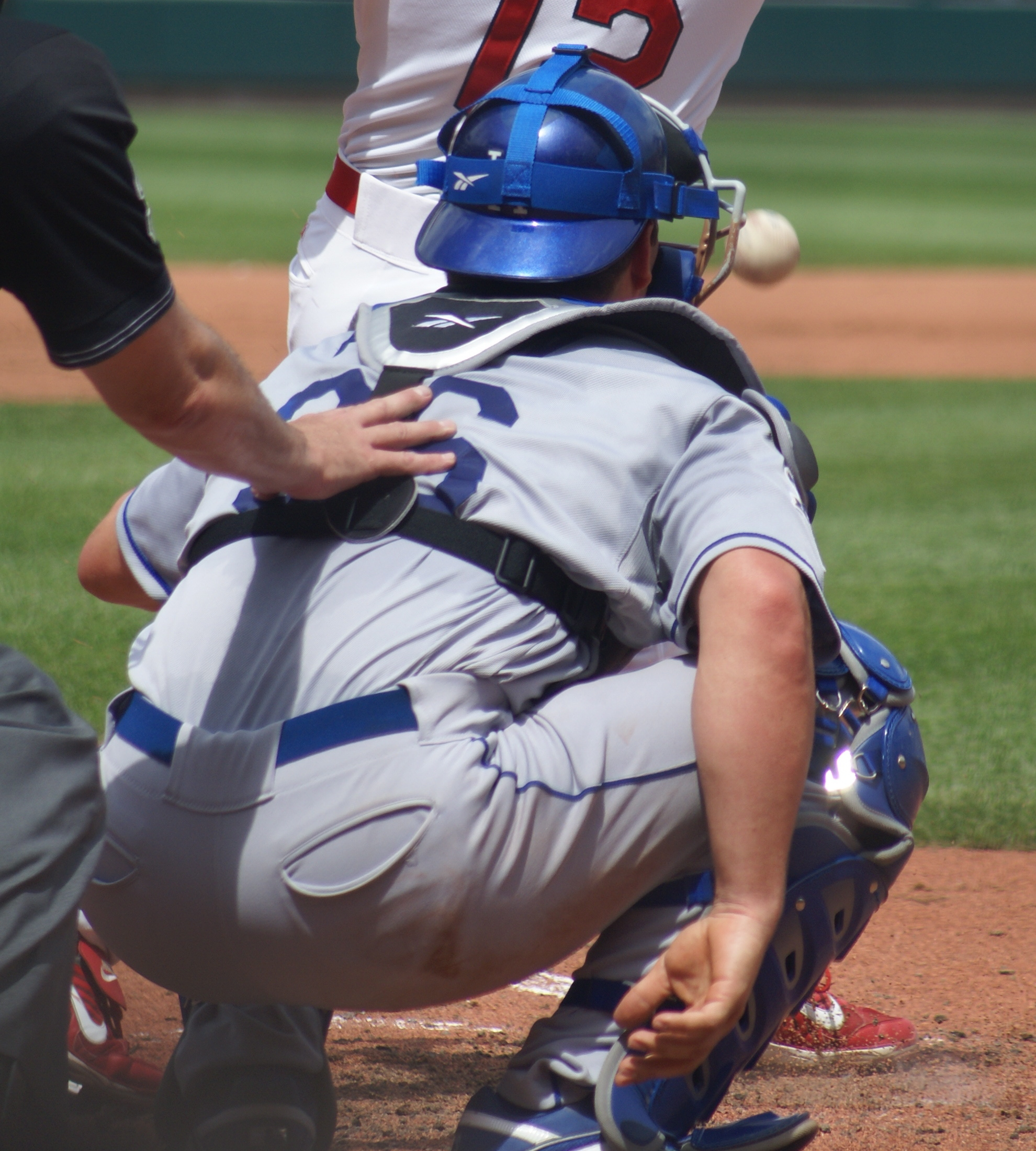
- Catcher
- Born: July 8, 1974 (age 50); Ville Platte, Louisiana, U.S.
- Batted: Right Threw: Right

MLB debut
- August 2, 2000, for the Minnesota Twins

Last MLB appearance
- September 26, 2008, for the Los Angeles Dodgers

MLB statistics
- Batting average: .206
- Home runs: 8
- Runs batted in: 35
- Stats at Baseball Reference

Teams
- Minnesota Twins (2000); Texas Rangers (2004); Colorado Rockies (2005–2006); Baltimore Orioles (2006); Los Angeles Dodgers (2008)

Daniel Wayne Ardoin (born July 8, 1974) is an American former professional baseball catcher. He played five seasons in Major League Baseball (MLB) from 2000 to 2008 for the Minnesota Twins, Texas Rangers, Colorado Rockies, Baltimore Orioles, and Los Angeles Dodgers.

== Early life ==
Ardoin attended Sacred Heart High School in Ville Platte, Louisiana, where he played for Scott Carter and helped lead the Trojans to a state title in 1992. He was also a letterman in football, baseball, golf and track. In baseball, he was named the Class AA Most Valuable Player as a senior. Ardoin was heavily recruited as a senior by the Seattle Mariners and the Cincinnati Reds, but chose to play JUCO ball at Texarkana Junior College, and then attended McNeese State University.

== Professional career ==
=== Early career ===
Ardoin was drafted by the Oakland Athletics in the fifth round of the 1995 MLB draft, and made his professional baseball debut with the Southern Oregon A's in the Northwest League. He made his way up through the A's farm system from 1996 to 2000, playing for the Modesto A's, Visalia Oaks, Huntsville Stars, Vancouver Canadians, and Sacramento River Cats.

On July 31, 2000, the A's traded Ardoin to the Minnesota Twins for Mario Valdez, and he was assigned to the AAA Salt Lake Buzz.

=== Minnesota Twins ===
After only three games with the Buzz, Ardoin made his major league debut on August 2, 2000 against the Baltimore Orioles, going hitless in two at-bats with three walks and a run scored. He played in 15 games with the Twins that year, finishing with a .125 batting average. He hit his first major league home run (his only one of the season) in the first inning on August 10 off the Tampa Bay Devil Rays' Tanyon Sturtze.

He spent the entire 2001 season at AAA with the Edmonton Trappers, hitting .255 in 302 at-bats and then became a free agent.

=== Kansas City Royals/Texas Rangers ===
Ardoin signed with the Kansas City Royals in December 2001 and played 25 games with the Omaha Royals before they released him. He was soon picked up by the Texas Rangers and played for their farm teams, the Tulsa Drillers and Oklahoma RedHawks. He spent two more seasons with Oklahoma, before getting another shot at the majors in late 2004 with the Rangers, appearing in six games for the team and getting one hit in eight at-bats.

=== Colorado Rockies ===
Ardoin next signed with the Colorado Rockies as a free agent in 2005 and began the season with the Colorado Springs Sky Sox. He was called up to the Rockies because of poor performance by the starting catcher J.D. Closser and an injury to backup Todd Greene. Ardoin set career highs in every offensive category, despite playing regularly in only the second half of the season. He compiled a .229 batting average with 6 home runs and 22 runs batted in.

The 2006 season began with Ardoin slated for a platoon catching role with free agent acquisition Yorvit Torrealba; however, with Torrealba injuring his shoulder during spring training, Ardoin assumed the starting role. Although Ardoin was one of the top defensive catchers in baseball, his offense struggled during the first two months of the 2006 season. In his first 94 at-bats, Ardoin hit for a .191 batting average with no home runs and two runs batted in.

Ardoin strained his left knee while tagging out Los Angeles Dodgers outfielder José Cruz Jr. on a play at home plate, and he was placed on the disabled list on May 27. Closser was recalled from the Rockies' Triple-A affiliate to fill in during Ardoin's absence. When Ardoin returned from his injury, the Rockies optioned Closser back to Triple-A; however, after being back with the Rockies for five games, Ardoin was designated for assignment on August 25, 2006, clearing a roster spot for rookie prospect Chris Iannetta.

=== Baltimore Orioles ===
On August 30, Ardoin was claimed by the Baltimore Orioles. He was immediately thrust into action with injuries to Orioles starting catcher Ramón Hernández and backup catcher Chris Widger. He appeared in only five games with the O's and recorded one hit in 13 at-bats before being released in September.

=== Nationals/Astros/Cardinals ===
Ardoin signed a minor league contract by the Washington Nationals prior to the 2007 season and was invited to spring training. He did not make the club and was traded to the Houston Astros for pitcher Wade Robinson on March 26. Ardoin spent the 2007 season in the minor league organizations of the Astros (Round Rock Express) and the St. Louis Cardinals (Memphis Redbirds).

=== Los Angeles Dodgers ===
Ardoin began the 2008 season with the Las Vegas 51s, the Triple-A affiliate of the Los Angeles Dodgers. On May 20, 2008, his contract was purchased by the Dodgers and he was recalled after backup catcher Gary Bennett was placed on the disabled list. Ardoin made his Dodgers debut on May 27 in the starting lineup against the Chicago Cubs. He stayed in the bigs as Russell Martin's lone backup and was named to the Dodgers playoff roster after they clinched the National League West, but did not play in the playoffs.

In the offseason, the Dodgers signed three-time Gold Glove winner Brad Ausmus to be the new backup catcher, and transferred Ardoin to the AAA Albuquerque Isotopes where he was scheduled to back up prospect A. J. Ellis. Ardoin got hurt and spent most of his final professional season on the minor league disabled list.

== Personal life ==
Ardoin lives with his wife Hope and four children in Moss Bluff, Louisiana. Currently Ardoin works at Mike Willis Ford in Sulphur, Louisiana as the General Manager.

Ardoin's son, Silas, graduated high school in 2019 and went on to catch for the University of Texas Longhorns baseball team, advancing to the College World Series in 2021 and 2022. Silas was selected in the 4th round of the 2022 Major League Baseball draft, 107th overall by the Baltimore Orioles.
