= John Maginnis (Louisiana political writer) =

American journalist

John James Maginnis
- Born: March 17, 1948; Baton Rouge, Louisiana, US
- Died: May 25, 2014 (aged 66); New Orleans, Louisiana, US
- Education: Louisiana State University
- Occupations: Journalist; Author; Commentator
- Spouse: Jackie Drinkwater Maginnis

John James Maginnis (March 17, 1948 – May 25, 2014) was a writer of columns and commentaries on current political events in his native Louisiana Maginnis' column appeared in newspapers and other sources statewide. His website is read by political analysts nationwide as a barometer of governmental trends and events in Louisiana.

== Career ==
After military service, Maginnis became a correspondent in Baton Rouge for The Catholic Commentator. He began his coverage of Louisiana political events in 1972. He wrote three books: The Last Hayride (1984), Cross to Bear (1992), and The Politics of Reform. The Last Hayride concerned the rise of Democrat Edwin Edwards to a then-unprecedented third nonconsecutive term as governor by unseating Republican David C. Treen in 1983. Cross to Bear narrated the controversial general election of 1991 when Edwards, thought to be politically finished, re-entered the governorship for a fourth term by coming up as the remaining alternative to David Duke.

In 2008, Maginnis began touting Louisiana Governor Bobby Jindal as a potential Republican contender for President or Vice President of the United States. He also questioned whether Jindal's potential for those offices was taking up too much time from state duties in Louisiana. Maginnis particularly observed Jindal's lack of enthusiasm for the Obama administration's economic "stimulus package" prior to Jindal's speaking to the nation as the Republicans' chosen responder to Obama's first address to Congress on February 24, 2009.

Maginnis was interviewed by Robert Siegel on National Public Radio (NPR) concerning Louisiana political trends.
