= Edgar Chatman =

American baseball player

- Pitcher
- Born: January 12, 1917; Ville Platte, Louisiana, U.S.

Negro league baseball debut
- 1944, for the Memphis Red Sox

Last appearance
- 1945, for the Memphis Red Sox

Teams
- Memphis Red Sox (1944–1945)

Edgar Chatman (born January 12, 1917) is an American former Negro league pitcher who played in the 1940s.

A native of Ville Platte, Louisiana, Chatman played for the Memphis Red Sox in 1944 and 1945. In five recorded appearances on the mound, he posted a 3.57 ERA over 35.1 innings.
