= Sacred Heart High School (Ville Platte, Louisiana) =

Sacred Heart School
- SHS Crest, created 1983

Location
- 114 Trojan Lane; Ville Platte, (Evangeline Parish), Louisiana 70586; United States; 30°41′7″N 92°16′8″W

Information
- Type: Private, Coeducational
- Motto: "Do or Die"
- Religious affiliation: Roman Catholic
- Established: 1913
- Pastor: Very Rev. Fr. Darren Eldridge
- High School Principal: Dawn Cox Shipp
- Elementary Principal: Danielle Ardoin
- Grades: K–12
- Average class size: 25
- Language: English
- Campus: Halls of Troy
- Campus type: Urban
- Colors: Blue and Gold
- Song: The Alma Mater
- Athletics: Football, Baseball, Basketball, Softball, Golf, Tennis, Track & Field
- Mascot: Trojan
- Team name: Trojans
- Accreditation: Southern Association of Colleges and Schools
- USNWR ranking: 1A
- Athletic Director: Derek Landry
- Website: www.shsvp.com

Sacred Heart School is a private, Roman Catholic high school in Ville Platte, Louisiana. It is located in the Roman Catholic Diocese of Lafayette.

It is the only Catholic school in Evangeline Parish.

== History ==
The Sisters of Mount Carmel opened the school in 1913. A poor area economy forced the school to close in 1928 but it reopened in September 1931 due to efforts from Father J. Maurice Bourgeois.

In May 2015 a group of parents protested, asking for the school to remove principal Dianne Fontenot, complaining about a decrease in student enrollment and excessive firing of personnel.

== Campus ==
The school has a high school and elementary school section. Both the elementary and high school each house administrative offices and a chapel. The high school chapel has a confessional, and the high school has 13 classrooms, a library, a science laboratory, a commons area, a dining area, and a gymnasium. The elementary school has 24 classrooms, two libraries, a gymnasium, a cafeteria, and a science laboratory.

== Student body ==
As of 2014 the school had 718 students in grades K-12, with 464 of them in K-8 and 254 in high school. As of 2014 students originated from Ville Platte, Bunkie, Grand Prairie, Mamou, Opelousas, Pine Prairie, Vidrine, Washington, and Whiteville.

== Accreditation ==
Sacred Heart of Jesus Catholic School is accredited by AdvancED. AdvancED is the unified organization of the North Central Association Commission on Accreditation and School Improvement (NCA CASI), Southern Association of Colleges and Schools Council on Accreditation and School Improvement (SACS CASI), and Commission on International and Transregional Accreditation (CITA).

== Athletics ==
Sacred Heart athletics competes in the LHSAA.

=== Championships ===
Football Championships

- (1) State Championship: 1967

Football
Sacred Heart and Ville Platte High School, since 2000, regularly play each other in the Tee Cotton Bowl. Jeré Longman of The New York Times stated that this game was created as a "unifying civic gesture".

== Notable alumni ==
- Danny Ardoin, Former MLB player (Minnesota Twins, Texas Rangers, Colorado Rockies, Baltimore Orioles, Los Angeles Dodgers)
