= René L. De Rouen =

American politician

René Louis De Rouen
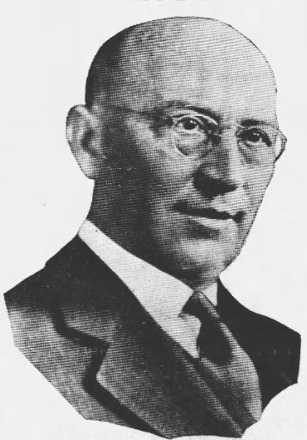

Member of the U.S. House of Representatives from Louisiana's 7th district
- In office August 23, 1927 – January 3, 1941
- Preceded by: Ladislas Lazaro
- Succeeded by: Vance Plauché

Personal details
- Born: January 7, 1874 St. Landry Parish, Louisiana, U.S.
- Died: March 27, 1942 (aged 68) Baton Rouge, Louisiana, U.S.
- Party: Democratic
- Education: St. Charles College, Grand Coteau, Louisiana
- Alma mater: Holy Cross College, New Orleans
- Occupation: Merchant, Banker, Farmer, Politician
- Committees: Chairman, Committee on Public Lands (Seventy-third through Seventy-sixth Congresses)

René Louis De Rouen (January 7, 1874 – March 27, 1942) was a U.S. representative from Louisiana.

Born on a farm near Ville Platte, then in St. Landry Parish (since the seat of government of Evangeline Parish), De Rouen attended private and public schools, and St. Charles College in Grand Coteau, Louisiana. He graduated in 1892 from Holy Cross College in New Orleans. De Rouen engaged in mercantile pursuits, banking, and farming. He served as delegate to the Louisiana constitutional convention in 1921.

De Rouen was elected as a Democrat to the Seventieth Congress to fill the vacancy caused by the death of Ladislas Lazaro. He was reelected to the Seventy-first and to the five succeeding Congresses and served from August 23, 1927, to January 3, 1941. He did not seek renomination in 1940. Fellow Democrat Vance Plauché, a campaign manager for Governor Sam Houston Jones of Lake Charles ran without opposition for the seat. Plauché did not seek reelection in 1942.

De Rouen served as chairman of the Committee on Public Lands (Seventy-third through Seventy-sixth Congresses). He served in the state banking department in Baton Rouge, after his retirement from Congress until his death. He died in Baton Rouge and is interred at Catholic Cemetery in Ville Platte.

U.S. House of Representatives
Preceded by Ladislas Lazaro	Member of the U.S. House of Representatives from Louisiana's 7th congressional district 1927–1941	Succeeded by Vance Plauché
