= Alexis LaTour House =

Historic house in Louisiana, United States

- Formerly listed on the U.S. National Register of Historic Places
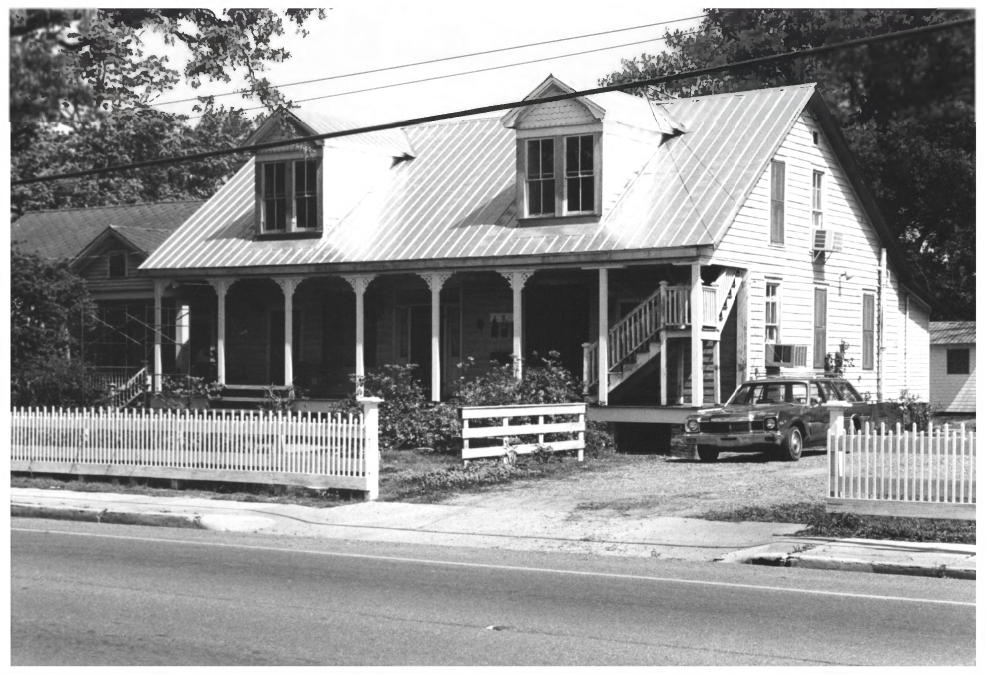

- Location within Louisiana Location within the United States
- Location: 247 East Main Street, Ville Platte, Louisiana
- Coordinates: 30°41′14″N 92°16′14″W
- Area: 0.33 acres (0.13 ha)
- Built: 1835
- Architect: Alexis LaTour
- NRHP reference No.: 87001492

Significant dates
- Added to NRHP: September 14, 1987
- Removed from NRHP: June 11, 2015

The Alexis LaTour House, also known as Old Homeplace and Guillory Homeplace, is a historic house formerly located in Ville Platte, Louisiana. The oldest portion of the house was built in 1835 by Alexis LaTour. The house was expanded in 1837. The original house was a 1 1/2-story Creole cottage of bousillage construction that was one room wide and two rooms deep and had a front gallery. The 1837 expansion added two rooms and a central hall. Details of the house, including an exterior staircase, bousillage construction, and beaded clapboarding, ceiling beams, and ceiling boards were common in traditional Creole architecture. Both the older and the newer part of the house had unusual mantels. The older mantel featured cove moldings, panels, and a large central lozenge. The other mantels in the house were more traditional but were still unusual.

In 1900 several modifications were made including the addition of Queen Anne style dormer windows and a large rear wing. Over time, other, smaller modifications have been made including the replacement of windows and doors, the replacement of the original gallery columns, and the replacement of front, exterior staircase. Despite the modifications, the house still retained significant integrity, including the basic Creole form of the house, the bousillage construction, the copious beading, and the original mantels at the time of its enlistment in the National Register of Historic Places. The house was the best detailed and largest surviving early structure in Evangeline Parish.

The house was listed on the National Register of Historic Places on September 14, 1987, for its architectural significance. It was delisted in 2015 since the house was moved by the owners about 22.3 miles (35.9 km) to the southeast in 1998. The house is still standing in Saint Landry Parish at 890 Chretien Point Road, Sunset (30°23′40″N 92°05′45″W).

== See also ==
- National Register of Historic Places listings in Evangeline Parish, Louisiana
- National Register of Historic Places listings in St. Landry Parish, Louisiana
