= Elizabeth Rickey =

American academic (1956–2009)

Beth Rickey
- Born: June 11, 1956; Lafayette, Louisiana, U.S.
- Died: September 12, 2009 (aged 53); Santa Fe, New Mexico, U.S.
- Education: University of Louisiana, Lafayette (BA, MA); Tulane University (PhD)
- Political party: Republican
- Relatives: Branch Rickey (uncle)

Elizabeth "Beth" Rickey (June 11, 1956 – September 12, 2009) was an American activist and leader in the anti-racism and anti-discrimination movement. Her efforts specifically focused on exposing former neo-Nazi and Ku Klux Klan leader David Duke.

== Early life and education ==
Elizabeth Rickey was born on June 11, 1956, in Lafayette, Louisiana, to Horace B. Rickey Jr., a United States Army lieutenant colonel in World War II, and his wife Flora Ann Womback. She had a brother named Robert and her uncle, Branch Rickey, was the first to sign an African American baseball player, Jackie Robinson, to an MLB team. The family was traditionally Republican and had a moral opposition to racial prejudice.

She attended what is now the University of Louisiana at Lafayette, where she received a Master of Arts degree in government, and Tulane University, where she earned a PhD in political science.

== Career ==
Rickey's father was a member of the Louisiana Republican State Central Committee, and in 1988 Rickey also become a member. After hearing David Duke speak on several occasions and one journalist familiar with Rickey noted that she recognized “that Duke was both more sinister than ordinary redneck racists and far more politically savvy." She felt that when he spoke, people could not always sense the racism in his words and as such, would not be able to see his true nature and danger.

After the Louisiana Coalition Against Racism and Nazism was formed in March 1990 by Lance Hill, Lawrence N. Powell, Jane Buchsbaum, and James Stovall, a minister from Baton Rouge, Rickey quickly joined.

=== Exposing David Duke ===
Rickey strongly disagreed with David Duke and viewed him as a sinister person. She stated that he was "a racial ideologue of a type that I have yet to encounter in my entire lifetime," and stated that he was worse than George Wallace and that he is "truly a type that one would find in the 1930s in Germany. He sees himself at this Messiah, that he's going to save the white race". Duke described his time in the Ku Klux Klan as a "youthful indiscretion" and after he was elected to the Louisiana House of Representatives as a Republican, Rickey began following Duke and recording what he stated at public gatherings. She began with a gathering of the Populist Party that was attended by Art Jones, whose hand Duke shook, and by people openly identifying as skinheads and members of the Ku Klux Klan. During his speech he described his win as a "victory for the white majority" and when Rickey's recording was later aired, Duke described the meeting as a conservative, anti-tax rally.

After learning of Rickey, Duke attempted to change her mind by inviting her to lunch, where he tried to convince her that the Holocaust had never happened, Jews in the concentration camps died of starvation, and warned her of the atrocity of mixing races. She took notes during the meeting, which led into her recording of the Populist Party gathering. Duke lost the 1991 election to Governor Edwin Edwards, with only 38.8% of the vote.

=== Awards and honors ===
In 1991, Elizabeth Rickey was nominated by the American Jewish Committee and won the Cavallo Foundation Award, which is given to people who go to great lengths to help and protect society at the risk of their own personal safety. In 2000, nine years before her death, Rickey was inducted into the Louisiana Center for Women in Government and Business Hall of Fame.

The Bard Center for the Study of Hate has created an award named after Rickey, the Beth Rickey Award, which is awarded to an individual who takes extreme action against hate in the world.

== Personal life ==
After exposing David Duke, Rickey traveled the world and converted to Catholicism, after which she became more focused on religion. She was also diagnosed with Crohn's disease and on September 12, 2009, Rickey died in Santa Fe, New Mexico, as a result of Crohn's disease and a virus she caught during a mission trip to Mexico.
