= Vance Plauché =

American politician

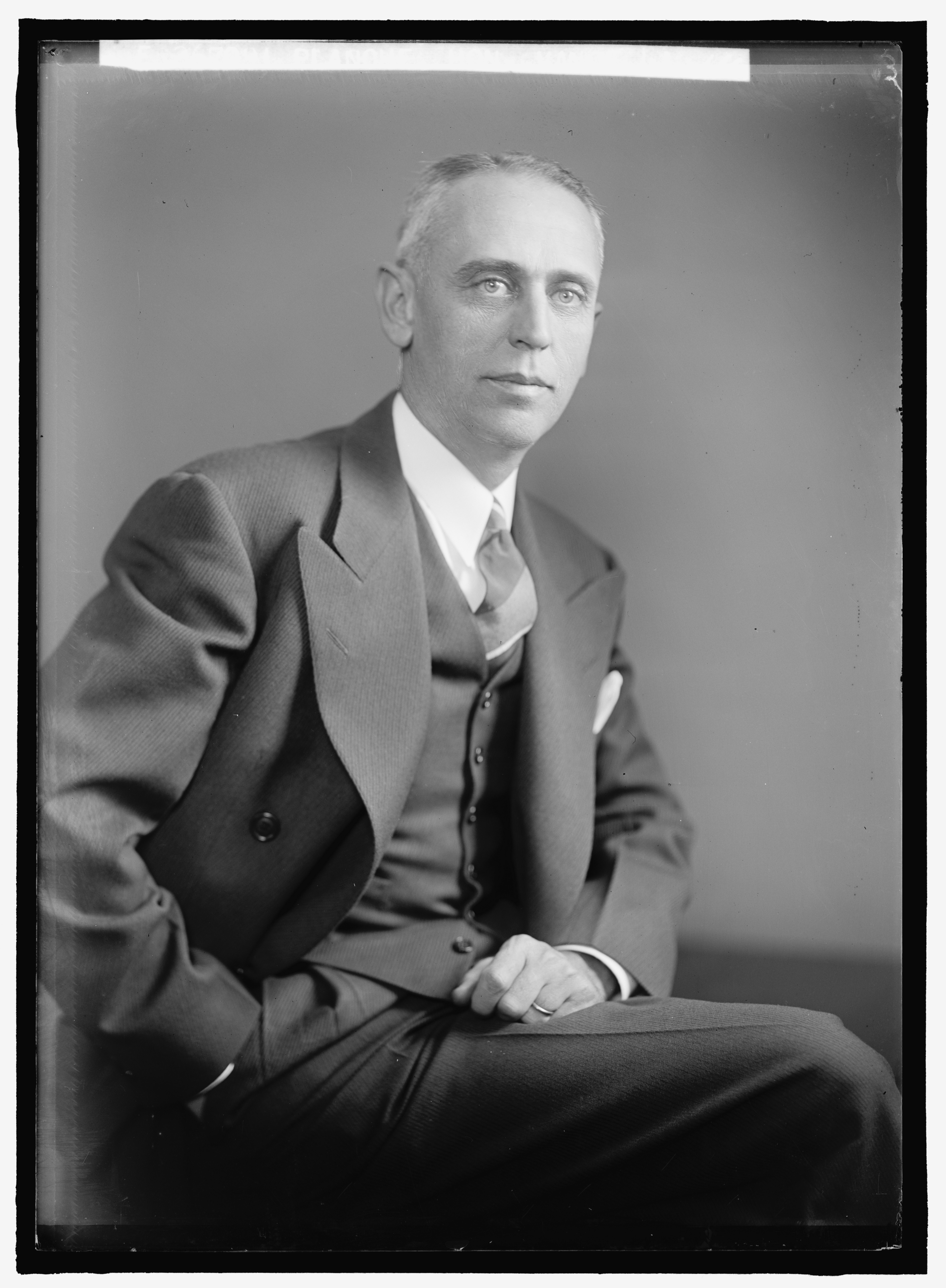

Member of the U.S. House of Representatives from Louisiana's 7th district
- In office January 3, 1941 – January 3, 1943
- Preceded by: René Louis DeRouen
- Succeeded by: Henry D. Larcade Jr.

Personal details
- Born: August 25, 1897 Plaucheville, Louisiana
- Died: April 2, 1976 (aged 78) Lake Charles, Louisiana
- Resting place: Consolata Cemetery, Lake Charles, Louisiana
- Party: Democratic
- Spouse: Marie Bush
- Education: College of St. Francis Xavier; Loyola University New Orleans
- Profession: Lawyer
- Awards: Order of St. Gregory the Great (Knight)

Military service
- Allegiance: United States
- Service: United States Army
- Years of service: 1917–1919
- Rank: Private First Class
- Unit: Base Hospital 102
- Wars: World War I

Vance Gabriel Plauché (August 25, 1897 – April 2, 1976) was an American attorney and politician from Louisiana. A Democrat, he served for a single term in the 77th Congress, from 1941 to 1943.

== Early life ==
Plauché was born in Plaucheville, Louisiana on August 25, 1897. He attended private and public schools in Avoyelles Parish and, in 1914, received a Bachelor of Science degree from New Orleans's St. Francis Xavier Commercial College, where he received awards for excellence in typing and final examinations.

In 1918, he received his Bachelor of Laws degree from Loyola University in New Orleans, where he served as class president. He was admitted to the bar in 1918, and practiced in Lake Charles.

== Start of career ==
During World War I, Plauché served in the United States Army. Inducted into the service at Camp Beauregard, Louisiana, he was a member of Loyola University's hospital unit, which subsequently served in Vicenza, Italy as Base Hospital 102. He attained the rank of private first class before being discharged at Camp Shelby, Mississippi in 1919.

Plauché was city attorney of Lake Charles from 1928 to 1932, and district counsel for the Home Owners' Loan Corporation from 1933 to 1935. In late 1939 and early 1940, he managed the successful gubernatorial campaign of Sam H. Jones. In 1940, he served as secretary of the State Civil Service commission, and was a delegate to the Democratic state convention.

== U.S. House of Representatives ==
In 1940, Plauché was the successful Democratic nominee for a seat in the United States House of Representatives. He served in the 77th Congress, January 3, 1941 to January 3, 1943.

During his House service, he was a member of the Committee on Irrigation and Reclamation, Committee on Invalid Pensions, and Committee on Patents. He was not a candidate for reelection in 1942, and resumed the practice of law.

== Later life ==
In addition to practicing law, Plauché was a director of Calcassieu Savings & Loan and the Plauché Engineering company. His civic, fraternal, and professional memberships included the American Legion, Kiwanis, chamber of commerce, Sierra Club, his local, county, state bar associations, and the American Bar Association.

== Death and burial ==
Plauché died in Lake Charles on April 2, 1976. He was buried at Consolata Cemetery in Lake Charles.

== Awards ==
In recognition of his services to the Catholic church, Pope John XXIII awarded Plauché the Order of St. Gregory the Great (Knight).

U.S. House of Representatives
| Preceded by René Louis DeRouen | Member of the U.S. House of Representatives from Louisiana's 7th congressional district 1941–1943 | Succeeded by Henry D. Larcade Jr. |
