= Henry D. Larcade Jr. =

American politician (1890–1966)

Henry Dominique Larcade Jr.
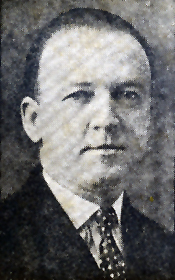

Member of the U.S. House of Representatives from Louisiana's 7th district
- In office January 3, 1943 – January 3, 1953
- Preceded by: Vance Plauché
- Succeeded by: T. Ashton Thompson

Member of the Louisiana State Senate
- In office 1928–1932
- In office 1956–1960

Member of the Louisiana House of Representatives
- In office 1936–1940

Member of the St. Landry Parish School Board
- In office 1913–1928

Personal details
- Born: July 12, 1890 Opelousas, St. Landry Parish, Louisiana, U.S.
- Died: March 15, 1966 (aged 75) Opelousas, Louisiana, U.S.
- Resting place: St. Landry Cemetery, Opelousas, Louisiana
- Party: Democratic
- Education: Opelousas High School, Academy Immaculate Conception, Opelousas Institute

Military service
- Rank: Second Lieutenant
- Unit: 348th Infantry, 87th Division, Quartermaster Corps, Officers' Reserve Corps
- Battles/wars: World War I

Henry Dominique Larcade Jr. (July 12, 1890 – March 15, 1966) was a U.S. representative from Louisiana.

Born in Opelousas, St. Landry Parish, Louisiana, Larcade attended the public and parochial schools, Opelousas High School, Academy Immaculate Conception, and Opelousas Institute. During the First World War, Larcade served as a private in the Three Hundred and Forty-eighth Infantry, Eighty-seventh Division, at Camp Pike in Arkansas, later obtaining a commission as second lieutenant, Quartermaster Corps, Officers' Reserve Corps. He engaged in the banking business and the general insurance business. He served as a member of the St. Landry Parish School Board 1913–1928. He served as a member of the State senate 1928–1932. He served as assistant clerk of the State senate 1932–1936. He served in the State house of representatives 1936–1940, having succeeded Felix Octave Pavy.

Larcade was elected as a Democrat to the Seventy-eighth and to the four succeeding Congresses (January 3, 1943 – January 3, 1953). He was not a candidate for renomination in 1952. He served as a member of the State senate once again from 1956 to 1960, paired with Bill Cleveland of Acadia Parish. He engaged in banking business. He was a resident of Opelousas, Louisiana, until his death there March 15, 1966. He was interred in St. Landry Cemetery.

U.S. House of Representatives
Preceded by Vance Plauché	Member of the U.S. House of Representatives from Louisiana's 7th congressional district 1943–1953	Succeeded by T. Ashton Thompson
