= T. Ashton Thompson =

American politician

Theo Ashton Thompson
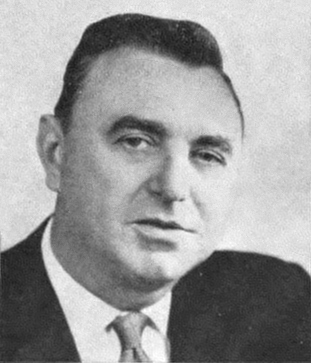

Member of the U.S. House of Representatives from Louisiana's 7th district
- In office January 3, 1953 – July 1, 1965
- Preceded by: Henry D. Larcade, Jr.
- Succeeded by: Edwin Washington Edwards

Personal details
- Born: March 31, 1916 Ville Platte, Louisiana, U.S.
- Died: July 1, 1965 (aged 49) Gastonia, North Carolina, U.S.
- Resting place: Evangeline Memorial Park; Ville Platte, Louisiana, U.S.
- Party: Democratic
- Education: Louisiana State University
- Occupation: Accountant

Military service
- Branch/service: United States Army Air Corps
- Battles/wars: World War II

Theo Ashton Thompson (March 31, 1916 – July 1, 1965) was a U.S. representative from Louisiana's 7th congressional district in the southwestern corner of the state.

Born in Ville Platte in Evangeline Parish in south Louisiana, Thompson attended public schools there. From 1932 to 1934, he completed a two-year course in higher accounting at Louisiana State University in Baton Rouge. From 1934 to 1940, Thompson was the traveling auditor for the Louisiana Highway Commission. In 1942, he was the Louisiana representative at the National Assembly of the States in the development of the civil defense program at a convention held in Chicago, Illinois.

Thompson was elected as a Democrat to the Eighty-third and to the six succeeding Congresses and served from January 3, 1953, until his death July 1, 1965, in an automobile accident in Gastonia, North Carolina. While in Congress he was a signatory to the 1956 Southern Manifesto that opposed the desegregation of public schools ordered by the Supreme Court in Brown v. Board of Education. He was interred at Evangeline Memorial Park Cemetery in Ville Platte.

Thompson was succeeded in Congress by the future Governor Edwin Washington Edwards, then a state senator from Acadia Parish.

During his time as a U.S. representative, Thompson developed a mostly liberal voting record; based on certain criteria.

== See also ==
- List of members of the United States Congress who died in office (1950–1999)

U.S. House of Representatives
Preceded by Henry D. Larcade, Jr.	Member of the U.S. House of Representatives from Louisiana's 7th congressional district 1953–1965	Succeeded by Edwin Washington Edwards
