= Edwin Edwards =

American politician (1927–2021)

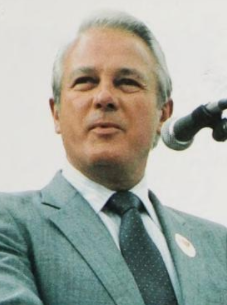
- Edwards in 1986

50th Governor of Louisiana
- In office January 13, 1992 – January 8, 1996
- Lieutenant: Melinda Schwegmann
- Preceded by: Buddy Roemer
- Succeeded by: Mike Foster
- In office March 12, 1984 – March 14, 1988
- Lieutenant: Robert Louis Freeman Sr.
- Preceded by: Dave Treen
- Succeeded by: Buddy Roemer
- In office May 9, 1972 – March 10, 1980
- Lieutenant: Jimmy Fitzmorris
- Preceded by: John McKeithen
- Succeeded by: Dave Treen

Associate Justice of the Louisiana Supreme Court
- In office April 14, 1980 – December 1, 1980

Member of the U.S. House of Representatives from Louisiana's 7th district
- In office October 2, 1965 – May 9, 1972
- Preceded by: Ashton Thompson
- Succeeded by: John Breaux

Member of the Louisiana State Senate from the 35th district
- In office May 12, 1964 – October 2, 1965
- Preceded by: Bill Cleveland
- Succeeded by: Howard A. Duncan

Personal details
- Born: Edwin Washington Edwards; August 7, 1927 Avoyelles Parish, Louisiana, U.S.
- Died: July 12, 2021 (aged 93) Gonzales, Louisiana, U.S.
- Party: Democratic
- Spouses: Elaine Schwartzenburg (m. 1949; div. 1989) Candace Picou (m. 1994; div. 2004) Trina Grimes Scott (m. 2011)
- Children: 5
- Education: Louisiana State University (BA, JD)

Military service
- Allegiance: United States
- Branch/service: United States Navy
- Years of service: 1945–1946
- Battles/wars: World War II

Edwin Washington Edwards (August 7, 1927 – July 12, 2021) was an American politician who served as the 50th governor of Louisiana for four terms (1972–1980, 1984–1988, and 1992–1996). A member of the Democratic Party, he previously served as a U.S. representative for Louisiana's 7th congressional district from 1965 to 1972. He served twice as many elected terms as any other Louisiana chief executive. He served a total of almost 16 years in gubernatorial office, which at 5,784 days is the sixth-longest such tenure in post-Constitutional U.S. history.

An influential figure in Louisiana politics, Edwards, who was dubbed the "very last of the line of New Deal Southern Democrats", was long dogged by charges of corruption. In 2001, he was found guilty of racketeering charges and sentenced to 10 years in federal prison. Edwards began serving his sentence in October 2002 in Fort Worth, Texas, and was later transferred to the federal facility in Oakdale, Louisiana. He was released from federal prison in January 2011, having served eight years. He was also considered to be the last remnant of the political machine founded and led by Huey Long and Earl Long to serve as governor.

In 2014, Edwards again sought election to the U.S. House of Representatives, running to represent Louisiana's 6th congressional district. He placed first in the jungle primary, but was defeated by Republican Garret Graves by nearly 25 percentage points in the runoff election, assumed to be a sign of Edwards' precipitous decline in popularity due to his felony conviction, as well as the Republican Party of Louisiana's growing dominance over state politics.

== Early life and career ==
Edwin Washington Edwards was born in rural Avoyelles Parish near Marksville on August 7, 1927. His father, Clarence Edwards, was a half-French Creole Presbyterian sharecropper, while his mother, the former Agnès Brouillette, was a French-speaking Catholic. Edwards' ancestors were among early Louisiana colonists from France who eventually settled in Avoyelles Parish, referred to as the original French Creoles. Like many 20th century politicians from Avoyelles, Edwards assumed that he had Cajun ancestry, when in fact he may have had none. His father was descended from a family in Kentucky that came to Louisiana during the American Civil War. His great-great-grandfather, William Edwards, was killed in Marksville at the beginning of the Civil War because of his pro-Union sentiment.

The young Edwards had planned on a career as a preacher. As a young man, he did some preaching for the Marksville Church of the Nazarene. He served briefly in the U.S. Navy Air Corps near the end of World War II. After his return from the military, he graduated at the age of twenty-one from Louisiana State University Law Center and began practicing law in Crowley, the seat of Acadia Parish. He relocated there in 1949 after his sister, Audrey E. Isbell, who had moved there with her husband, told him there were few French-speaking attorneys in the southwestern Louisiana community.

Edwards entered politics through election to the Crowley City Council in 1954. He was a member of the Democratic Party which, in that era, had a monopoly on public offices in Louisiana, but which fell out of favor in the late 20th century. Edwards remained on the Crowley council until his election to the Louisiana State Senate in 1964; in that race he defeated, in a major political upset in the Democratic primary, the incumbent Bill Cleveland, a Crowley businessman who had served for twenty years in both houses of the Louisiana legislature. Years later as governor, Edwards appointed Cleveland's daughter, Willie Mae Fulkerson (1924–2009), a former member of the Crowley City Council, to the Louisiana Board of Prisons.

== 1971–1972 campaign for governor ==
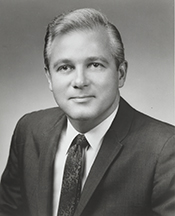
Edwards as Congressman, circa 1969

In the election of 1971–1972, Edwards won the governorship after finishing first in a field of seventeen candidates in the Democratic primary, including the final race of former governor Jimmie Davis and Gillis Long, a relative of Huey Long. His greatest support came from southern Louisiana, particularly among its large numbers of Cajun, Creole, and African-American voters.

Both Edwards and Johnston ran on reform-oriented platforms during the primary, but Edwards was more adept at making political deals and building alliances for the runoff round of voting. Edwards said that the major philosophical difference that he held with Johnston was in regard to their "awareness of problems of the poor". Johnston won the endorsement of Edwards' legislative colleague, Joe D. Waggonner of Bossier Parish, but the Shreveport state senator declined to accept Edwards' offer of a televised debate between the two.

Bill Dodd, who was defeated for state superintendent of education in the same election cycle that Edwards was winning the governorship in for the first time, attributed the Edwards victory in part to political kingmaker Louis J. Roussel Jr., of New Orleans. According to Dodd, Roussel "can do more than any other individual in Louisiana to elect any candidate he supports for any office in this state. ... He is such a good administrator and motivator that he can put together an organization that will win in business and in politics."

== First two terms as governor, 1972–1980 ==
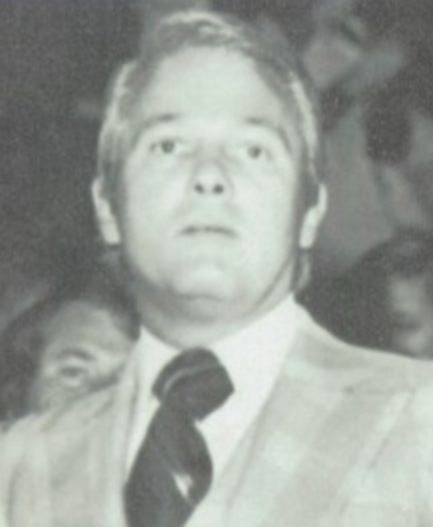
Edwards during his first term as governor.

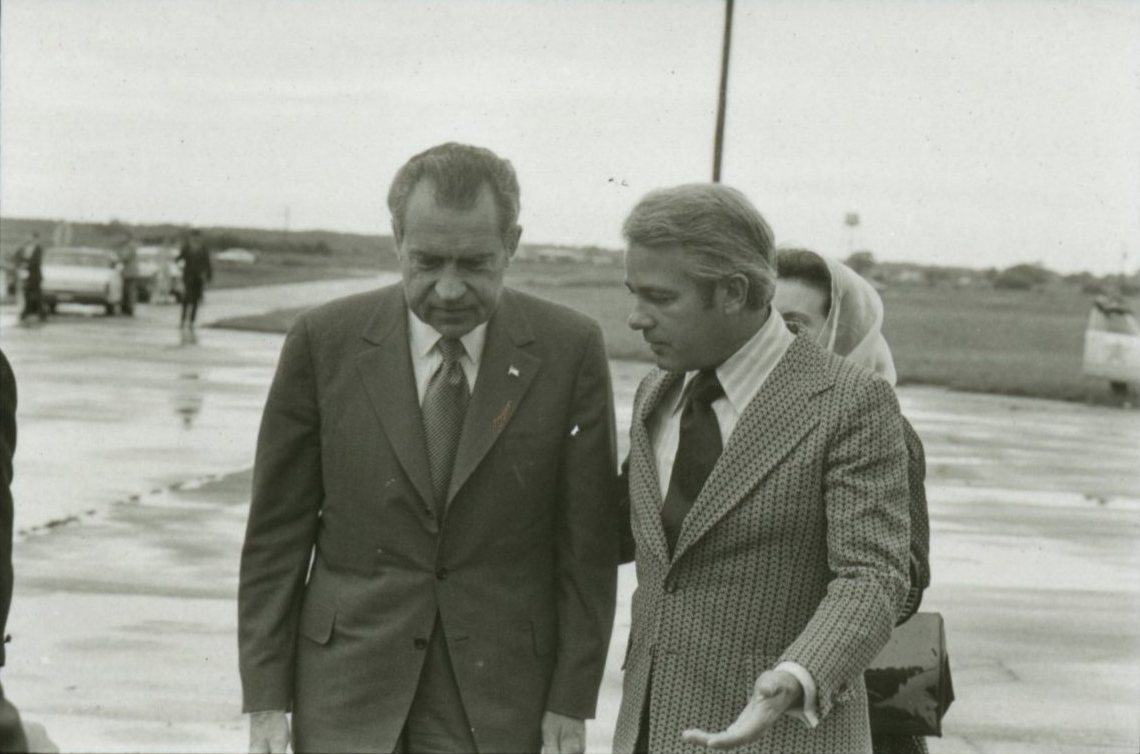
Edwards with President Richard Nixon in 1972

Both in his political rhetoric and in his public persona, Edwards cast himself as a Louisiana populist in the tradition of Huey P. Long and Earl K. Long. He was inaugurated as governor on May 9, 1972. One of his first acts was to call for a constitutional convention to overhaul Louisiana's bulky charter.

On taking office, Edwards hired J. Kelly Nix as his executive assistant and in 1974 elevated him to first executive assistant. In the second term, however, Nix left the administration to take office as the Louisiana state school superintendent. Dale Thorn, who had been Edwards' press secretary while he was in Congress, continued in that position for the first and most of the second Edwards terms. He was later associate commissioner of higher education for the Louisiana Board of Regents, and a journalism professor at Louisiana State University.

Under Edwards, Michael H. O'Keefe of New Orleans in 1976 was named president of the state Senate, an office that was held by the lieutenant governor prior to the implementation of the state Constitution of 1974. In 1983, as Edwards prepared to return to office, O'Keefe was engulfed in scandal and forced to resign as senate president. e was replaced by Edwards loyalist Samuel B. Nunez Jr., of Chalmette in St. Bernard Parish. On the same day Edwards won election to a third term, O'Keefe lost his bid for a seventh term by a wide margin to state Rep. Ben Bagert. In 2013, O'Keefe was still serving time in prison for a 1999 conviction.

During his first two terms in office, Edwards developed a reputation for being a flamboyant politician. Charismatic, well dressed, and quick with clever one-liners and retorts, he maintained wide popularity.

=== Policies and achievements ===
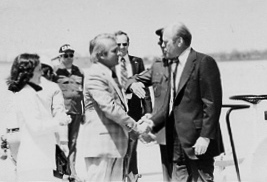
Edwards shakes hands with President Gerald Ford, April 1976

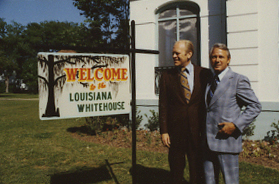
Edwards with President Ford, April 1976

After enduring three grueling rounds of voting in the 1971–1972 campaign, Edwards pushed a bill through the legislature that limited state elections to two rounds by having Democratic, Republican, and independent candidates run together on the same ballot in a nonpartisan blanket primary. Though the jungle primary system was intended to benefit Edwards' own political career, many observers cite it as being a major factor in the eventual rise of the state's Republican Party and the creation of a genuinely competitive two-party system. For this, Edwards was facetiously christened "father of Louisiana's Republican Party".

William Denis Brown III, a lawyer and a state senator from Monroe, was Edwards's floor leader in the upper legislative chamber in the first term as governor. A native of Vicksburg, Mississippi reared on a plantation north of Lake Providence in East Carroll Parish, Brown was instrumental in drafting the Louisiana Mineral Code. Thereafter from 1980 to 1988, Brown was the chairman of the Louisiana Board of Ethics.

Early in the first gubernatorial term, Edwards initiated the creation of the first new Louisiana state constitution in more than a half century. He intended to replace the Constitution of 1921, an unwieldy and outmoded document burdened with hundreds of amendments. A constitutional convention was held in 1973; the resulting document was put into effect in 1975. As of 2021, the 1973 Constitution remains in effect. Edwards also undertook a major reorganization of the state government, abolishing over 80 state agencies and modeling the remaining structure after that of the federal government.

Edwards named State Representative J. Burton Angelle of Breaux Bridge as his director of the Louisiana Department of Wildlife and Fisheries, a key appointment which Angelle filled for Edwards' first three terms of office.

Edwards' tenure in the 1970s coincided with a huge boom in the state's oil and gas industry after the gas pricing crisis of 1973. Edwards was able to greatly expand the state's oil revenues by basing severance taxes on a percentage of the price of each barrel rather than the former flat rate. This oil money fueled a massive increase in state spending (a 163% increase between 1972 and 1980), and Edwards was able to consistently balance the state budget due to the boom in oil revenue. Much of this increased spending went toward health and human services programs and increased funding for vocational-technical schools and higher education.

Edwards easily won reelection in 1975, with 750,107 votes (62.3 percent). In second place was Democratic state senator Robert G. "Bob" Jones of Lake Charles, son of former governor Sam Houston Jones, with 292,220 (24.3 percent). Secretary of State Wade O. Martin Jr., ran third with 146,363 (12.2 percent). Thereafter, Jones and Martin became Republicans. Addison Roswell Thompson, the perennial segregationist candidate from New Orleans, made his last race for governor in the 1975 primary.

=== Early scandals ===
Though arguably minor compared to the Edwards scandals of the 1980s and 1990s, the governor was embroiled in several ethics controversies during his first two terms in office. At the time, Edwards was remarkably candid about his questionable practices. When questioned about receiving illegal campaign contributions, he replied that "It was illegal for them to give, but not for me to receive." He also insisted he saw no problem with investing in a proposed New Orleans office building called "One Edwards Square" (it was never actually named that) while still governor, and demonstrated his gambling prowess to the press on one of his frequent gambling trips to Las Vegas. Later, Edwards' commissioner of administration Charles Roemer – father of future governor Buddy Roemer – was convicted of taking bribes and having connections with Mafia boss Carlos Marcello. Edwards managed to avoid direct implication in the Roemer case. In 1976 he pardoned an associate of Marcello, Frank Caracci, who had been convicted of bribing an IRS agent and of illegal gambling activities. Marcello was secretly recorded by the FBI praising Edwards, he stated “Edwin and me, we all right. But I can’t see him every day. He’s the strongest son of a bitch governor ever had”.

During the governor's first term, a disaffected former Edwards bodyguard named Clyde Vidrine made several high-profile accusations of corruption, including the sale of state agency posts. The accusations were investigated by a grand jury, but the Edwards administration attacked Vidrine's credibility and the investigation stalled. Later, Vidrine published a tell-all book called Just Takin' Orders, which included salacious details of Edwards' frequent gambling trips and extramarital escapades. Vidrine was murdered in December 1986 by the husband of a woman he was guarding, who believed Vidrine was having an affair with his wife.

In a 1976 scandal known as Koreagate, it came to light that Edwards and his wife Elaine had received questionable gifts in 1971, while Edwards was a U.S. representative. South Korean rice broker Tongsun Park was under investigation for trying to bribe American legislators on behalf of the South Korean government, and for making millions of dollars in commissions on American purchases of South Korean rice. Edwards admitted that Park gave Elaine an envelope containing $10,000 in cash, but insisted that the gift was given out of friendship and that there was nothing improper about it. In the course of the controversy, Edwards stated that he thought it was "super moralistic" for the U.S. government to prohibit American businessmen to accept gifts from foreign officials in the course of their business dealings. The scandal also engulfed Edwards's former congressional colleague Otto Passman of Monroe, who was later acquitted of all charges in the case, but nonetheless was defeated in his 1976 re-election bid by Jerry Huckaby of Ringgold.

== First political comeback: Edwards vs. Treen, 1983 ==
Barred by the state constitution from seeking a third term immediately after his second, Edwards temporarily left politics in 1980 but made it clear he would run again for governor in 1983. He served as a temporary Associate Justice of the Louisiana Supreme Court from April 14, 1980 to December 1, 1980. He began raising money and touring the state long before the 1983 election, maintaining what supporters called "the government in waiting". Early in 1982, Edwards said that he was so committed to running again for governor that "only death alone can separate me from this. ... We are being led by a governor whose only answer to unemployment is to buy a $350,000 jet."

In 1979, Republican David Treen was narrowly elected governor on a pledge of good government reform. Edwards had supported Treen's opponent, Democratic Public Service Commissioner Louis Lambert of Ascension Parish. As widely expected, Edwards in 1983 defeated Treen's re-election attempt. The election offered a clear contrast between the flamboyant, charismatic Edwards and the low-key, policy-oriented Treen. While Treen focused on Edwards' reputation for corruption and dishonesty, Edwards sought to portray Treen as incompetent and unresponsive to the public. Treen said of Edwards: "It's difficult for me to understand his popularity", which indicated in the eyes of many that he did not fully comprehend Louisiana politics. The two major candidates spent over $18 million (approximately $56.25 million in 2024 dollars) between them; the election became renowned as one of the most expensive campaigns ever conducted in a state the size of Louisiana. John Maginnis' 1984 book, The Last Hayride, chronicles this colorful but lopsided campaign.

Before election day, Edwards joked with reporters: "The only way I can lose this election is if I'm caught in bed with either a dead girl or a live boy." Edwards zinged Treen many times, once describing Treen as "so slow it takes him an hour and a half to watch 60 Minutes." During a gubernatorial debate in 1983, Treen asked Edwards, "How come you talk out of both sides of your mouth?" Edwards instantly responded, "So people like you with only half a brain can understand me."

Edwards' brother, Marion David Edwards (1928–2013), was part of the 1983 campaign and of the entourage that headed to France and Belgium early in 1984 to raise money to repay a lingering $4.2 million campaign debt. Six hundred supporters joined the Edwardses on an eight-day tour that included dinner at Versailles and gambling in Monte Carlo. Each paid $10,000. Edwards expected a 70 percent profit on the contributors' tickets to retire the debt. Bumper stickers were printed in blue and gold campaign colors and distributed to those who contributed to the retirement of this debt. For years afterwards, motorists saw stickers on vehicles bearing the slogan, "I did Paris with the Gov."

== Third term as governor, 1984–1988 ==
State finances nosedived during the third Edwards administration. Money from petroleum severance taxes decreased sharply in the middle 1980s because of plummeting oil prices. In 1984, Edwards attempted to deal with the erosion of state revenue by approving $730 million—Edwards had requested $1.1 billion—in new personal taxes, including a 1 percentage point increase in the state sales tax, $61 million in higher corporate income taxes, and $190 million in additional gasoline taxes. The legislature, overwhelmingly dominated by lawmakers beholden to Edwards, passed these taxes into law, but the taxes were highly unpopular and damaged Edwards' level of public support. Republican state representative Terry W. Gee of New Orleans said at the time, "Nobody realized the magnitude of what's going on; I've had 180 phone calls in two days against the higher taxes."

Much of Edwards' support in the 1970s had been fueled by high levels of social spending during times of economic prosperity; with economic conditions worsening, his popularity waned. To obtain passage of the higher taxes, Edwards first submitted Treen's 1984–1985 proposed budget as a warning to lawmakers. The Treen budget, he claimed, would cut state spending too drastically and cause roads to fall apart, bridges to collapse, and insurance premiums to skyrocket. Edwards predicted that if lawmakers passed Treen's budget instead of the higher taxes the voters would rebel and blame the legislature itself for the results. In the end, Edwards got most of what he wanted and was able to use the excuse of teacher pay increases to put pressure on lawmakers.

=== John Volz indictment and trials ===
In February 1985, soon after his third term began, Edwards was forced to stand trial on charges of mail fraud, obstruction of justice, and bribery, brought by U.S. Attorney John Volz. The charges were centered around an alleged scheme in which Edwards and his associates received almost $2 million in exchange for granting preferential treatment to companies dealing with state hospitals. Edwards proclaimed his innocence and insisted that the charges were politically motivated by Volz and the Republican Party. The first trial resulted in a mistrial in December 1985, while a second trial in 1986 resulted in an acquittal. After Edwards and his four co-defendants were acquitted, the hotel where the jurors had been sequestered revealed that half of the jurors had stolen towels as they left. Edwards quipped that he had been judged by a "jury of my peers".

Russell B. Long had correctly predicted in March 1985 that Edwards would indeed be acquitted by a Louisiana jury and that the ensuing trial would not disrupt state government. When Long announced his retirement from the U.S. Senate seat that he had held since 1948, he indicated his preference for Edwards as his senatorial successor but added, correctly, that he did not think Edwards would enter the 1986 Senate election. Long's successor would be U.S. Representative John Breaux, Edwards' successor for the 7th District seat 14 years earlier.

Prosecutors referred to Marion Edwards, also indicted in the alleged health care scheme, as a "bag man" for his brother. Marion ridiculed this characterization at a French Quarter bar in New Orleans, when media representatives were present. He placed a shopping bag on his head to resemble a crown and tossed about phony $100 bills.

Edwards later recited during a toast at a French Quarter bar, though his beverage was non-alcoholic as he was a teetotaler, a rhyming invitation for Volz to "kiss my ass". The trials were rather lengthy, and at one point during the first trial but before the mistrial Edwards rode to the Hale Boggs U.S. Courthouse on a mule from his hotel. When asked by reporters why he did so, he replied something to the effect that it was symbolic of the speed and intellect of the federal judicial system, but also that he supported "tradition". Marion Edwards, an attorney, often wore a pinstripe suit with a top hat and cane and held comedic press briefings at the end of each court session on the steps of the courthouse. Marion Edwards mocked the U.S. Department of Justice, U.S. Attorney Volz, and United States Judge Marcel Livaudais, who presided over the trials.

Even after beating the Volz indictment, Edwin Edwards' popularity was in decline. Despite his acquittal, the trial brought many sordid details of Edwards's conduct under public scrutiny. It was revealed that during frequent gambling trips to Las Vegas, Edwards lost hundreds of thousands of dollars under aliases such as T. Wong, E. Lee, B. True and Ed Neff (Edwards said he signed E. Nuff (enough), but computers read the name as "Ed Neff"), later paying these gambling debts using suitcases stuffed with cash of unknown origin.

After the trial, Edwards' support for the legalization of gambling as a solution to the state's severe revenue shortages contributed to a further decline in his popularity. He had made unpopular budget cuts to education and other social programs earlier in his term. Beginning in January 1986, he argued that legalizing casino gambling in up to fifteen locations and creating a state lottery would be a way to restore the programs, but the state legislature rejected his gambling proposals. Entering a tough re-election campaign in 1987, Edwards seemed vulnerable. Going into the election, his disapproval ratings ranged from 52 to 71 percent.

At first Edwards had predicted that a casino and a state lottery would net the state $600 million; then he lowered the expectations to $150 million. Both gambling measures would eventually be implemented, but not during Edwards' third term.

== Defeat: Edwards vs. Roemer, 1987 ==
Several notable candidates lined up to face Edwards in the 1987 gubernatorial election. Perhaps his strongest early challenger was Republican Congressman Bob Livingston. Also in the race were Billy Tauzin, a then-Democratic Cajun congressman from Thibodaux who was a strong Edwards supporter while serving in the state legislature from 1972 to 1980; Democratic secretary of state Jim Brown of Ferriday, and a Democratic congressman from Bossier City, Buddy Roemer, the son of former Commissioner of Administration Charles Roemer, who climbed up from a series of low poll rankings early in the campaign.

=== "Anyone But Edwards" ===
Edwards was the issue of the campaign. Because of his name recognition, his resilient supporters, and unmatched political skill, even a weakened Edwards could safely assume he would win a place in Louisiana's unique primary election system runoff. The question was whether his opponent in the runoff would be someone who could beat him.

There was a prevailing sense in the race that Edwards needed Livingston in the runoff. Livingston was a Republican in a state that had at that point elected only one Republican governor since Reconstruction. And Livingston was widely perceived as lacking in charisma and personality, which would work to Edwards's advantage. Any other opponent, a moderate Democrat without the ethical problems, would be dangerous. To that end, Edwards talked up Livingston. Perhaps the key moment in the 1987 race came at a forum between the candidates. As usual, the main topic of discussion was Edwin Edwards. His challengers were asked, in succession, if they would consider endorsing Edwards in the general election if they did not make it to the runoff. The candidates hedged, particularly Secretary of State Brown, a reliable Edwards supporter in the state Senate who in his 1979 election drew many of the same voters who supported fellow Democrat Louis Lambert in his failed gubernatorial bid in the same general election vs. Treen. The last candidate to speak was Buddy Roemer: "No, we've got to slay the dragon. I would endorse anyone but Edwards." The next day, as political commentator John Maginnis put it, Jim Brown was explaining his statement while Buddy Roemer was ordering "Slay the Dragon" buttons. Boosted by his endorsement as the 'good government candidate' by nearly every newspaper in the state, Roemer stormed from last place in the polls and on election night, overtook Edwin Edwards and placed first in the primary election, with 33 percent of the vote compared with Edwards' 28 percent. This marked the first time Edwin Edwards ever finished other than in first place in an election.

In what seemed to be the end of Edwards' political career, the governor withdrew from the contest in his concession speech, automatically electing Buddy Roemer governor. In fact, he was cleverly setting a trap for Roemer. By withdrawing, Edwards denied Roemer the opportunity to build a governing coalition in the general election race, and denied him the decisive majority victory that he surely would have attained. In one stroke, Edwards made Buddy Roemer a minority governor. Also, Edwards virtually ceded control of the state to Roemer even before his inauguration. By doing so, he passed on the burden of the state's problems to the new governor, who was essentially under the gun even before assuming office. For four years, Roemer struggled to be a reform governor of Louisiana as so many had before him. And although virtually no one realized it at the time, Edwin Edwards quietly waited in the wings for a return to power.

== Second comeback: Edwards vs. Duke, 1991 ==
As the 1991 governor's race drew near, many of Edwards' friends encouraged him to abandon his planned comeback, believing he had no chance of winning. After Edwards' loss in 1987, journalist Lanny Keller wrote that the only way Edwin Edwards could ever be elected again was to run against Adolf Hitler. Edwards' runoff opponent would be former Grand Wizard of the Ku Klux Klan, David Duke.

The runoff between an avowed white supremacist and a suspected felon gained national attention. The Louisiana Coalition against Racism and Nazism was formed to challenge Duke, with its leadership including longtime Treen supporter Beth Rickey, a member of the Louisiana Republican State Central Committee from New Orleans. The coalition revealed through a recording of Duke at a White Nationalist conference that he was still involved in Ku Klux Klan activities.

Edwards found himself receiving endorsements from notable Republican politicians including Treen, Roemer, and even president George H. W. Bush. A popular bumper sticker urging support for Edwards read "Vote For the Crook. It's Important." Others read "No Dukes" and "Vote for the Lizard, not the Wizard." Edwards said of Duke that "the only thing we have in common is that we both have been wizards beneath the sheets" and feigned concern for Duke's health due to smoke inhalation "because he's around so many burning crosses". When a reporter asked Edwards what he needed to do to triumph over Duke, Edwards replied "stay alive". On election day, Edwards defeated Duke in a landslide, 61% to 39%, a margin of nearly 400,000 votes, in an election that saw record breaking turnout. His margin of victory over Duke was also noticeably higher than the margin Louisiana U.S. Senator J. Bennett Johnston achieved over Duke in the 1990 Democratic primary for the Senate.

== Fourth term as governor, 1992–1996 ==
In his last term, Edwards asked his boyhood friend, Raymond Laborde, to leave the state House after twenty years to serve as commissioner of administration. Laborde, who had once defeated Edwards for class president at Marksville High School and had earlier been his legislative floor leader, agreed to join the administration. He invited former state Representative Kevin P. Reilly Sr., of Baton Rouge, former CEO of Lamar Advertising Company to serve as secretary of economic development. Reilly had been removed in 1986 as chairman of the Louisiana House Appropriations Committee after having criticized Edwards.

In 1992, Edwards appointed the professional penologist, Richard Stalder, as secretary of the Louisiana Department of Public Safety & Corrections, a position that used to be given to political supporters. Stalder remained secretary until 2008, serving during three subsequent gubernatorial terms in the position.

During his previous term as governor, Edwards promoted casino gambling in Louisiana, which had been a major part of his platform in the 1991 campaign. In June 1992, his heavy lobbying led the state legislature to pass a bill calling for a single large land-based casino in New Orleans. He also appointed a board that, at his private direction, awarded 15 floating riverboat casinos that had been authorized by the Legislature and the Roemer administration. He appointed a political ally, Paul Fontenot, to head the State Police; he would oversee the licensing and investigation of casino operators. On another front he again demonstrated his broad commitment to civil rights by becoming the first Southern governor to issue an executive order protecting lesbian, gay, and bisexual persons from discrimination in state governmental services, employment, and contracts.

Despite the discovery that some licensees had links to organized crime or other unsavory ties, Edwards blocked the revocation of their licenses. But a political backlash against gambling-related corruption began. Though he had originally planned to run for re-election in 1995, he announced in June 1994, shortly after marrying his second wife Candy Picou, that he would be retiring from politics at the end of his term. Edwards was succeeded as governor by State Senator Murphy J. Foster Jr., who ran as an opponent of gambling interests. Edwards retired to a newly purchased home in Baton Rouge, intent on returning to a private law practice and living out his remaining days in contentment with his young wife, Candy, who was Edwards' junior by 37 years.

== Indictment and conviction ==
Former Congressman Cleo Fields achieved considerable notoriety in 1997 when an FBI surveillance videotape showed him accepting a large amount of cash (about $20,000) from Edwards and stuffing it in his pockets. At the time Fields stated that the incident was just an innocent business transaction between friends, and said there was a humorous explanation, which he would make public shortly thereafter. A cloud hung over Fields as an unindicted co-conspirator in Edwards' criminal trial and in the end Fields refused to deliver the promised "humorous" explanation, stating that at the time of the cash transfer, he was not an elected official, and therefore under no obligation to explain publicly.

After being fingered by Texas for-profit prison entrepreneur Patrick Graham, who allegedly gave him $845,000 in conjunction with a scheme to locate a private juvenile prison in Jena in La Salle Parish, Edwards was indicted in 1998 by the federal government with the prosecution led by U.S. Attorney Eddie Jordan. The prosecution soon released transcripts of audio conversations, and excerpts of video surveillance that seemed to indicate dubious financial transactions. The Edwards investigation also resulted in the conviction of San Francisco 49ers owner Edward J. DeBartolo Jr., who admitted to paying Edwards a $400,000 bribe (DeBartolo was convicted for not reporting the extortion) in exchange for Edwards's assistance in securing a riverboat casino license. The conviction caused DeBartolo to be fined by the NFL, and barred from active control of the 49ers for a year.

Edwards was found guilty on seventeen of twenty-six counts, including racketeering, extortion, money laundering, mail fraud, and wire fraud; his son Stephen was convicted on 18 counts. "I did not do anything wrong as a governor, even if you accept the verdict as it is, it doesn't indicate that", Edwards told the press after his conviction. On his way to prison he said, "I will be a model prisoner, as I have been a model citizen". From 2002 to 2004 Edwin Edwards was incarcerated at the Federal Medical Center in Fort Worth, Texas.

Edwards' sometime co-conspirator, Cecil Brown, a Eunice cattleman, was convicted for his part in the payoffs in 2002. Brown was also convicted in 2000 on four counts of extortion and racketeering by the same jury which found Edwin and Stephen Edwards guilty.

In 2004, Edwards filed for divorce from his second wife Candy, saying that Mrs. Edwards had "suffered enough" during his incarceration. In June 2005, the former Mrs. Edwards was arrested for threatening a police officer at a traffic stop in Port Barre, screaming "don't you know who I am?"

In 2005, Edwards was moved to the Federal Correctional Institution in Oakdale in Allen Parish, where he served his sentence as inmate #03128-095. According to the Federal Bureau of Prisons, he was scheduled to be released on July 6, 2011. In prison, he served as the facility's librarian: "I did what I could for my fellow inmates. I helped a number of them get their GEDs and I was helping several more when my term expired. Now, I have to be honest; I didn't stick around to see if they succeeded ..."

Two men whom Edwards defeated in Louisiana elections—David C. Treen and J. Bennett Johnston Jr.—and a third who was his protégé and successor in the Seventh District U.S. House seat, U.S. Senator John Breaux, confirmed in July 2007 that they intended to approach then U.S. President George W. Bush to seek a pardon or commutation for Edwards, who celebrated his 80th birthday in prison in August 2007. Bush denied a pardon for Edwards before he left the presidency on January 20, 2009.

Edwards supporters also lobbied U.S. President Barack Obama for a pardon for Edwards so he might run in the 2011 Louisiana gubernatorial election. Obama did not reply to petitions by supporters of Edwards and lacking a pardon, Edwards remained ineligible to seek the governorship of Louisiana until the end of his life and would have only been eligible to run after fifteen years would have passed from the end of his sentence.

In 2009, Edwards was listed as an "honorary pallbearer" at the funeral of perennial political candidate L. D. Knox of Winnsboro, who in the 1979 gubernatorial contest, when Edwards was not on the ballot, legally changed his name to "None of the Above" Knox to dramatize his support for the "None of the Above" option in elections.

On January 13, 2011, Edwards was released from prison and served the remainder of his sentence at a halfway house. His sentence ended on July 6, 2011 and he began three years of probation. He entered into home confinement at his daughter's Denham Springs, Louisiana home through the supervision of a halfway house, on January 13, 2011. Following that, Edwards was placed on probation. On February 7, 2013, Edwards was granted early release from probation due to good behavior. His wife Trina made the announcement on her Facebook page.

In a poll taken in October 2011, months after he had been released from prison, 30 percent of respondents named Edwards the state's best governor since 1980.

== 2014 Congressional election ==
In February 2014, Edwards announced that he was contemplating running in the 2014 election to represent Louisiana's 6th congressional district in the U.S. House of Representatives, which is centered on the state capital of Baton Rouge. With U.S. Representative Bill Cassidy exiting the seat to run for the Senate, Edwards said of the solidly Republican district: "I'm the only hope the Democrats have here." He formally declared his candidacy at a March 17 meeting of the Press Club of Baton Rouge, saying, "I want you to know, I'm going to give it every effort." If no candidate wins a majority of the vote, a runoff would be held on December 6, 2014, between the top two candidates. Two other Democrats, a Libertarian and nine Republicans, most notably Garret Graves, a former aide to Governor Bobby Jindal, State Senator Dan Claitor, businessman Paul Dietzel II, and State Representative Lenar Whitney, also sought the seat.

After Edwards' announcement, Cassidy told KEEL radio news in Shreveport that he doubted that Edwards "has a chance. It's a conservative district, and he's obviously not a conservative. But it kind of shows, I think, to a certain extent that the Democratic bench is weak." Louisiana political writer John Maginnis said that Edwards was "likely to make the runoff" because of his name recognition, but "I don't see how he could win in a strong GOP-performance district like the 6th. But it should be entertaining." State pollster Elliott Stonecipher said that "the most basic math of the Edwards race yields an 'it is not impossible' answer" and former governor Buddy Roemer said that while it is unlikely, "yes, [Edwards] can win".

An April 2014 article in Politico that discussed his chances noted that he was "still sharp as a razor" and "in remarkably vigorous health". He pronounced himself "disappointed" with President Obama for "sitting" on the Keystone Pipeline and listed his campaign priorities as "Building support for a high-speed rail system between Baton Rouge and New Orleans and emphasizing the good aspects of Obamacare, while doing what I can to change or amend the provisions that I think are onerous." He said that he would have voted against the Affordable Care Act, but criticized Governor Jindal for not accepting the Medicaid expansion. If elected, he hoped to serve on the Committee on Transportation and Infrastructure, to spur the construction of elevated roadways in the state.

A September 2014 survey of statewide Louisiana voters by Public Policy Polling found that 40% had a favourable opinion of Edwards, 44% did not and 17% were unsure. Asked whether they would rather have Edwards as governor than incumbent Republican governor Bobby Jindal, 47% said they would prefer Edwards, 43% preferred Jindal and 10% were not sure.

Edwards finished first in every poll taken of the race, though only with a plurality. Runoff polls showed him losing to all of his Republican opponents. An article in The Times-Picayune in late October 2014 noted that he had run a vigorous, serious campaign and noted that, as previously, analysts were split on whether he could actually win. David Wasserman of The Cook Political Report said that for Edwards, "mathematically, victory is something close to impossibility." Conversely, a spokesman for Republican opponent Lenar Whitney and political analyst Michael Beychok both said that he had a chance to win and Republican candidate Garret Graves said "There's no one alive anymore in this state that has the experience or, quite frankly, the tactics (of) Edwin Edwards." Edwards was expected to make the runoff, with his chances dependent on which Republican joins him, with several analysts saying that Edwards' best chance would come if Whitney, the most conservative Republican running, does so. Edwards' strategy was to appeal to black and Cajun voters and conservative Democrats, also campaigning on college campuses to appeal to younger voters. Columnist Bob Mann predicted that if Edwards made the runoff, the media would decry Louisiana voters' toleration for corruption when, "in truth (Edwards) never really had a chance to win."

As expected, Edwards as the principal Democratic candidate led the 2014 primary field for Congress with 77,862 votes (30.1 percent), winning every parish in the district. He then faced the Republican runner-up, Garret Graves, in the December 6 runoff election. Graves had received 70,706 "jungle primary" votes (27.4 percent). Losing Republican candidates were Paul Dietzel II, with 35,013 votes (13.6 percent), state Senator Dan Claitor with 26,520 (10.3 percent), and state Representative Lenar Whitney with 19,146 votes (7.4 percent). Edwards lost to Graves by a 62–38 percent margin in the runoff. It was only the second loss of his political career.

However, in 2024, the election data analysis website Split Ticket found that Edwards had overperformed the Democratic baseline in the district with a Wins above replacement (WAR) score of D+24.5.

== Edwards' record of longevity ==
Edwards has the seventh longest gubernatorial tenure in post-Constitutional U.S. history at 5,784 days. Few governors have served four four-year terms. Edwards followed George Wallace of Alabama, Jim Hunt of North Carolina, Bill Janklow of South Dakota, Terry Branstad of Iowa, Lewis Cass of Michigan, and Jim Rhodes of Ohio as 16-year governors. However, Branstad was elected to a fifth nonconsecutive term as governor of Iowa in 2010, placing him second to George Clinton of New York (21 years) as the longest-serving governor in U.S. history, and won a sixth term as governor in 2014. In December 2015 Branstad surpassed New York's George Clinton as the longest-tenured governor in American history, with 8,169 days in office.

Veteran journalist Iris Kelso once described Edwards as clearly "the most interesting" of the six governors that she had covered while working for three newspapers and WDSU, the NBC television affiliate in New Orleans. Kelso declared Edwards more colorful than Earl Long, whom she covered for less than a year in the office.

== Personal life ==
=== Marriages and family ===
In 1949, Edwards married Elaine Schwartzenburg, whom he had met at Marksville High School. The couple had four children, daughters Anna and Victoria and sons Stephen and David. In August 1972, Edwards appointed her as an interim U.S. senator to complete the unfinished term of Allen J. Ellender of Houma, who died while campaigning for his seventh term in office. Ellender was President pro tempore and chairman of the Committee on Appropriations at the time of his death. Elaine Edwards resigned seat six days after the election of Ellender's permanent successor, J. Bennett Johnston, in order to give Johnston seniority over other new senators elected on November 7, 1972 (including future President Joe Biden).

On July 1, 1989, the couple divorced after forty years of marriage. They had begun living apart on March 15, 1988, the day after Edwards' third term ended. Mrs. Edwards did not reside at the Louisiana Governor's Mansion during Edwin's third term, instead staying at the family's ranch in southeast Baton Rouge.

In 1994, Edwards married Candy Picou (born 1964). In 1997, the couple entered the headlines when they attempted to have a child. Edwards had a vasectomy reversal, and the couple froze sperm to attempt to have a baby but were not successful.

In July 2011, Edwards married Trina Grimes, his prison pen pal. They began corresponding while he was serving his sentence for corruption. At the time of the wedding, he was 83, and she was 32. On August 1, 2013, Grimes gave birth to their child. In 2013, Edwards and Trina co-starred in an A&E reality show, The Governor's Wife based on their life together.

=== Extended family ===
One of Edwards's brothers, Nolan Edwards, a former assistant district attorney in Acadia Parish, was murdered in Crowley by an irate client in 1983, the same year that Edwards was engineering his comeback bid for a third term as governor. Nolan's killer, Rodney Wingate Jr., of Church Point, Louisiana, then killed himself. Wingate had been pardoned by Governor Edwards in 1980 for two drug convictions in the 1970s, a pardon procured through the intervention of Nolan Edwards. Nolan's murder halted the 1983 politicking. Newspapers carried a photograph of brothers Edwin and Marion locked in an embrace on an airport tarmac.

Marion Edwards, an insurance agent and political consultant, was a cancer survivor and counseled other patients for many years. Born on July 10, 1928, in Marksville, he died on January 12, 2013, at the age of eighty-four at his home in Broussard near Lafayette, Louisiana. The cause of death was not released. The Marion D. Edwards Fellowship in Hepatic Oncology at the M.D. Anderson Hospital and Tumor Institute in Houston, Texas, is named in his honor. Marion Edwards, who was Nazarene, was survived by his second wife, the former Deborah "Penny" Meaux, and three daughters from his first marriage to Aline Luther Edwards: Wanda Edwards, Elizabeth Kersten, and Donna Edwards.

Another brother, Allen Edwards, the longtime owner of a farm and heavy equipment company in Quitman in northern Arkansas, died in 2009, while Edwards was in prison. Edwards did not attend the funeral because of security difficulties.

Edwards was an uncle by marriage to former U.S. Representative Charles Boustany, a Republican from Lafayette, whose district includes much of the territory represented from 1965 to 1972 by then-U.S. Representative Edwin Edwards. Boustany's wife is the former Bridget Edwards, a daughter of Nolan Edwards.

=== Third wife and reality television show ===
On July 29, 2011, Edwards married Trina Grimes Scott (born August 1978) from Baton Rouge, at the Monteleone Hotel in New Orleans. Edwards' one-time prison pen pal, she was 51 years his junior and was born midway in his second term as governor. She is a Republican.

Edwin and Trina Edwards were the subjects of the reality show The Governor's Wife, which premiered October 27, 2013, on the Arts & Entertainment Network. The program focused on Trina's rearing of teenage sons and acting as stepmother to Edwards' daughters who are almost twice her age. According to the A&E description of the program: "Between school projects, running for president of the Homeowner's Association, fending off skeptics who think she's a gold digger, and thoughts of adding a baby of their own to the mix, the Edwards clan truly represents a new take on the modern family." The couple announced February 15, 2013, that Trina was pregnant. Trina gave birth to their son on August 1, 2013.

=== Health and death ===
Edwards did not drink alcohol or smoke.

In 2015, Edwards was hospitalized for pneumonia. On December 13, 2016, Edwards was hospitalized under stable condition again for pneumonia in Baton Rouge.

Edwards was rushed to the hospital again by ambulance in November 2020, with shortness of breath. Edwards returned to his home in Gonzales after spending two nights at Our Lady of the Lake Medical Center in Baton Rouge. It was reported that he had a common head cold and he reportedly tested negative for both COVID-19 and pneumonia, as well as the flu. His wife told the media that he was resting well and "giving orders" once he got home.

Edwards was sent to hospice care for pain in his lungs in Gonzales, Louisiana on July 6, 2021. He died six days later on July 12, 26 days short of his 94th birthday. The cause of death was respiratory complications. At the time of his death, Edwards had outlived four of his successors: Dave Treen, Buddy Roemer, Mike Foster, and Kathleen Blanco.

He would lie in state at the Louisiana State Capitol in Baton Rouge on July 17, 2021. He was initially buried at Resthaven Gardens of Memory, Baton Rouge, East Baton Rouge Parish, Louisiana, However, his widow Trina would later exhume his remains in October 2021 and have him cremated. A year after Edwards' death, Trina would be engaged to another Louisiana political legend, former Louisiana House speaker and Senate President John Alario. Alario was Edwards' handpicked choice when he twice served as speaker of the House.

== Bibliography ==
- State of Louisiana – Biography
- Boulard, Garry, "Edwin Edwards: Reflections on a Life", Times of Acadiana, August 15, 2001.
- Bridges, Tyler. Bad Bet on the Bayou: The Rise of Gambling in Louisiana and the Fall of Governor Edwin Edwards. Farrar, Straus, and Giroux, 2001.
- Dawson, Joseph G. The Louisiana Governors: From Iberville to Edwards. Baton Rouge: LSU Press, 1990.
- Honeycutt, Leo. Edwin Edwards, Governor of Louisiana, An Authorized Biography by Leo Honeycutt. Lisburn Press, 2009.
- Lemann, Nancy. Ritz of the Bayou. Knopf, 1987.
- Maginnis, John. The Last Hayride. Baton Rouge: Gris Gris Press, 1984.
- Maginnis, John. Cross to Bear. Baton Rouge: Darkhorse Press, 1992.
- Reeves, Miriam G. The Governors of Louisiana. Gretna, Louisiana: Pelican Publishing Company, 1998.
- United States Congress. "Edwin Edwards (id: E000067)". Biographical Directory of the United States Congress.

U.S. House of Representatives
Preceded by Ashton Thompson	Member of the House of Representatives from Louisiana's 7th congressional district 1965–1972	Succeeded by John Breaux
Party political offices
Preceded by John McKeithen	Democratic nominee for Governor of Louisiana; 1972, 1975	Succeeded by Louis Lambert
Preceded by Louis Lambert	Democratic nominee for Governor of Louisiana; 1983	Succeeded by Buddy Roemer
Preceded by Buddy Roemer	Democratic nominee for Governor of Louisiana; 1991	Succeeded by Cleo Fields
Political offices
Preceded by John McKeithen	Governor of Louisiana; 1972–1980	Succeeded by Dave Treen
Preceded by Dave Treen	Governor of Louisiana; 1984–1988	Succeeded by Buddy Roemer
Preceded by Buddy Roemer	Governor of Louisiana; 1992–1996	Succeeded by Mike Foster
