= Ville Platte High School =

Public high school in Ville Platte, Louisiana

Location
- 210 West Cotton Street; Ville Platte, (Evangeline Parish), Louisiana 70586; United States; 30.6862°N 92.2776°W

Information
- Type: Public high school
- Established: 1908
- School district: Evangeline Parish School Board
- Principal: Shelsy Williams
- Staff: 40.78 (FTE)
- Enrollment: 526 (2023-2024)
- Student to teacher ratio: 12.90
- Colors: Purple and white
- Mascot: Bulldog
- Nickname: Bulldogs
- Rivals: Sacred Heart High School (Ville Platte, Louisiana)
- Website: vphs.epsb.com

Ville Platte High School (VPHS) is a senior high school in Ville Platte, Louisiana. It is a part of the Evangeline Parish School Board.

== History ==
The school first began in 1908.

Jeré Longman of The New York Times wrote that the facilities began to deteriorate after racial integration occurred in 1969. By 2008, the school received upgrades to its computer laboratory and library and a new metal roof, along with other items within $2.4 million with of repairs and improvements. In 2008, the school had about 400 students. That year Longman stated that the classrooms were "no longer considered safe". The State of Louisiana had given the school failing marks, and under No Child Left Behind it was considered failing.

On November 4, 2008, Evangeline Parish voters opted not to accept a property tax increase that would construct a new facility for the school. The United States Justice Department accused the parish's remodeling efforts of being inadequate and sought the school's closure. Toni Hamlin, the superintendent of the parish school system, argued that the district had completed the renovations mandated by the 2004 federal school reorganization plan.

== Demographics ==
As of 2008 the school's student body was mostly black; while the town was about 60% black and 40% white many of the white residents did not send their kids to this school.

== Athletics ==
Ville Platte High athletics competes in the LHSAA.

=== Athletic history ===
In a 2006 article, it was stated that the athletic facilities were "run-down" with a track that had its rubberized surface worn out, a basketball court not of regulation sizes.

Football
Since 2000, Sacred Heart High School and Ville Platte High regularly play each other in the Tee Cotton Bowl. This game was created as a "unifying civic gesture".

== Notable alumni ==
- Greg LaFleur, NFL player
- PlatteBabyBray, American rapper
