= Ville Platte, Louisiana =

- City
- City of Ville Platte
- Etymology: Ville Platte, French ('Ville' being the French word for 'town' and 'platte' meaning 'flat')
- Location of Ville Platte in Evangeline Parish, Louisiana.

- Location of Louisiana in the United States
- Coordinates: 30°41′05″N 92°15′32″W
- Country: United States
- State: Louisiana
- Parish: Evangeline
- Founded: 1824
- Incorporated as a town: 1858
- Qualified to be incorporated as a city: 1950
- Founder: Marcellin Garand

Government
  - Type: Mayor-council

Area
  - Total: 4.02 sq mi (10.40 km^{2})
  - Land: 4.02 sq mi (10.40 km^{2})
  - Water: 0 sq mi (0.00 km^{2})
- Elevation: 72 ft (22 m)

Population (2020)
  - Total: 6,303
  - Density: 1,569.1/sq mi (605.85/km^{2})
- Time zone: UTC-6 (CST)
  - Summer (DST): UTC-5 (CDT)
- ZIP code: 70586
- Area code: 337
- FIPS code: 22-78715
- GNIS feature ID: 2405654
- Website: www.cityofvilleplatte.com

Ville Platte is the largest city in, and the parish seat of, Evangeline Parish, Louisiana, United States. The population was 6,303 at the 2020 census, down from 8,145 in 2000. The city's name is of French origin, roughly translating to "flat town", in reference to its relatively flat topography in contrast to the more hilly terrain north of the area.

== History ==
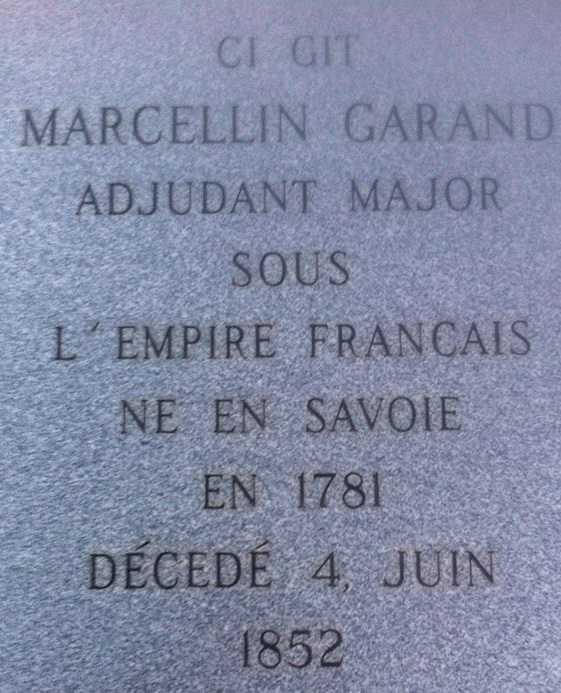
Grave marker for Marcellin Garand at Old Ville Platte Cemetery in Ville Platte

The area surrounding Ville Platte was likely first settled in the latter half of the eighteenth century, during the period of Spanish rule in Louisiana. The earliest record of settlement in the immediate vicinity dates to the 1780s.

According to popular legend, the founder of Ville Platte was Marcellin Garand, an adjudant major in the Army of the French Empire during the reign of Napoleon. In 1824, Garand obtained one of the first two lots that were platted in what is now Ville Platte, with the second being obtained by Dr. Robert Windex. Those lots were obtained from the estate of William O'Donegan, marking what is generally considered the town's founding.

The first post office in Ville Platte was established in 1842 with Marcellin Garand as postmaster from 1842 to 1848.

== Geography ==
Ville Platte is located in eastern Evangeline Parish

According to the United States Census Bureau, Ville Platte has a total area of 4.0 square miles (10.4 km^{2}), of which 0.25 acres (0.001 km^{2}), or 0.01%, is water.

U.S. Route 167 passes through the city as Main Street (eastbound) and Lasalle Street (westbound). The highway leads southeast 17 miles (27 km) to Opelousas and north 52 miles (84 km) to Alexandria. Louisiana Highway 10 passes through the city in tandem with US 167 but leads northwest 28 miles (45 km) to Oakdale.

Chicot State Park, Louisiana's largest state park, is located 8 miles (13 km) north of Ville Platte. The park covers 6,400 acres (26 km^{2}) of rolling hills and water and has large numbers of deer, raccoon, and other wildlife.

== Demographics ==
Historical population
Census	Pop.	Note	%±
1870	135		—
1880	149		10.4%
1900	163		—
1910	603		269.9%
1920	1,364		126.2%
1930	1,722		26.2%
1940	3,721		116.1%
1950	6,633		78.3%
1960	7,512		13.3%
1970	9,692		29.0%
1980	9,201		−5.1%
1990	9,037		−1.8%
2000	8,145		−9.9%
2010	7,430		−8.8%
2020	6,303		−15.2%
2025 (est.)	6,172	▼	−2.1%
U.S. Decennial Census

Ville Platte racial composition as of 2020
Race	Number	Percentage
White (non-Hispanic)	1,864	29.57%
Black or African American (non-Hispanic)	4,069	64.56%
Native American	6	0.1%
Asian	52	0.83%
Other/Mixed	232	3.68%
Hispanic or Latino	80	1.27%

As of the 2020 United States census, there were 6,303 people, 3,007 households, and 1,686 families residing in the city.

== Education ==
Public schools in Evangeline Parish are operated by the Evangeline Parish School Board. Three campuses are located in Ville Platte - James Stephens Montessori School (Grades PK-4), Ville Platte Elementary School (Grades PK-4), and Ville Platte High School (Grades 5–12).

There are also two private schools. Sacred Heart of Jesus Catholic School is a Roman Catholic school, serving grades K-12. Christian Heritage Academy is a Christian school, serving grades PK-12.

The famous St. Landry Parish Sheriff Cat Doucet was educated in Ville Platte.

== Culture ==
Ville Platte is located in Louisiana's Cajun country. The town is famous for its smoked meat and swamp pop music and bills itself as "Smoked Meat Capital of the World". Ville Platte has been officially designated by the Louisiana Legislature at the "Swamp Pop Capital of the World," recognizing the town's "long, rich history of fostering the development of swamp pop music."

Ville Platte has significant Creole and Cajun cultural associations (cuisine, music, language etc.). It lies at the northern point of the "French Triangle" with a significant francophone population residing in the city as well as the parish. It is located just north of the birthplace of Creole music, (i.e. Zydeco music) the Plaisance community. Zydeco has become one of the signatures of Louisiana culture throughout the world.

Ville Platte hosts two large festivals each year. The Louisiana Cotton festival, run in conjunction with the Le Tournoi, and the Festival de la Viande Bouccanee (Smoked Meat Festival) are held in Ville Platte annually. Ville Platte and the surrounding areas participate in the traditional Mardi Gras held in Mamou.

The Louisiana Swamp Pop Museum is located in a former railway station in Ville Platte.

== Government ==
Former U.S. Representative T. Ashton Thompson of Louisiana's 7th congressional district, since disbanded, was born in Ville Platte in 1916. He died in office in 1965 as a result of injuries sustained in an automobile accident in Gastonia, North Carolina. His death paved the way for Edwin Washington Edwards to assume the seat.

Walter L. Lee served as the Evangeline Parish Clerk of Court for 56 years, from 1956 to 2012.

The current mayor, Ryan Leday Williams, was elected in 2022 after defeating incumbent mayor Jennifer Vidrine, who was the first woman and first African American to hold the position.

City officials:

- Mayor: Ryan Leday Williams (D), 2023–present
- Chief of Police: Al Perry Thomas (D), 2023–present
- City Marshall: Nicole Snoddy, 2020–present
- City Clerk: Donald Bergeron, 2023–present
- City Judge: J. Gregory Vidrine, 2014–present
- City Attorney: Chris Ludeau, 2023–present

Members of the City Council:

- District A: Faye Lemoine, 2018–present
- District B: Anna L. Frank (D), 2023–present
- District C: Tracey Jagneaux (R), 2023–present
- District D: Shawn D. Roy (D), 2023–present
- District E: Christina Sam (D), 2022–present
- District F: Bryant Riggs (D), 2014–present

Members of the Louisiana Legislature:

- Senate, District 28: Heather Cloud (R), 2020–present
- House of Representatives, District 38: Rhonda Butler (R), 2020–present

== Notable residents ==
- Danny Ardoin (Former Major League Baseball Player)
- Edgar Chatman (Former Negro Leagues Baseball Player)
- Joseph Verbis Lafleur (a Servant of God)
- Bennett Landreneau (Former 2 Star General)
- Rico Noel (Former Major League Baseball Player)
- Austin Pitre (Cajun Music Artist)
- René L. De Rouen (Former United States Representative)

== Points of interest ==
- Chicot State Park
- Alexis LaTour House
- Flat Town Music Co
