= Louisiana's 1st State Senate district =

American legislative district

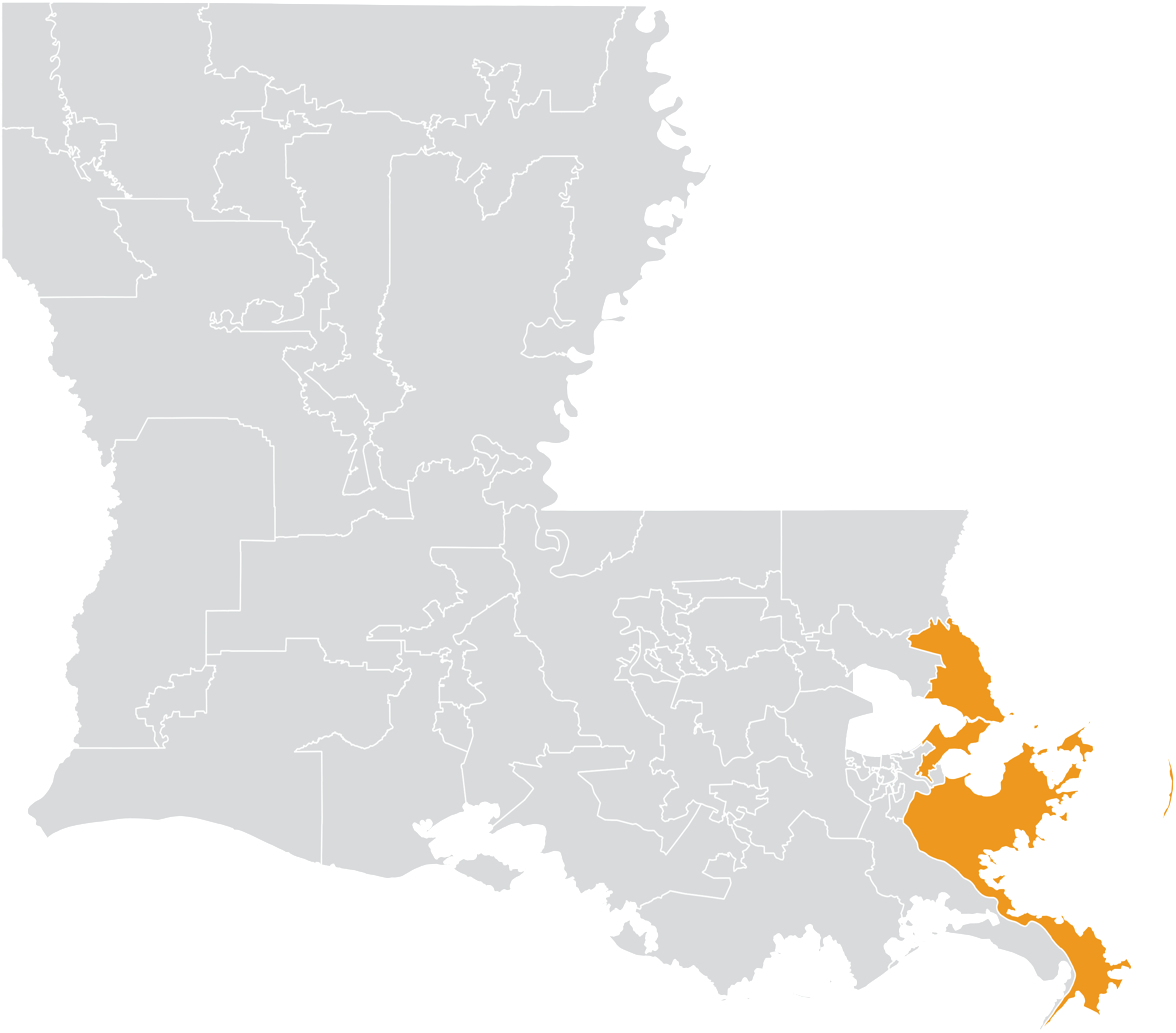
Senator
| Sharon Hewitt; R–Slidell |
- Registration: 37.3% Republican; 31.8% Democratic; 31.0% No party preference
- Demographics: 69% White; 19% Black; 7% Hispanic; 2% Asian; 1% Native American; 2% Other
- Population (2019): 128,150
- Registered voters: 81,685

Louisiana's 1st State Senate district is one of 39 districts in the Louisiana State Senate. It has been represented by Republican Sharon Hewitt since 2016.

== Geography ==
District 1 is largely based in St. Tammany Parish in Greater New Orleans, stretching south to also include smaller parts of Orleans, Plaquemines, and St. Bernard Parishes. The uninhabited Chandeleur Islands are also located within the district.

The district overlaps with Louisiana's 1st and 2nd congressional districts, and with the 74th, 76th, 90th, 103rd, and 104th districts of the Louisiana House of Representatives.

== Recent election results ==
Louisiana uses a jungle primary system. If no candidate receives 50% in the first round of voting, when all candidates appear on the same ballot regardless of party, the top-two finishers advance to a runoff election.

=== 2019 ===
2019 Louisiana State Senate election, District 1
| Party | Candidate | Votes | % |
|---|---|---|---|
| Republican | Sharon Hewitt (incumbent) | Unopposed | 100 |
| Total votes | | Unopposed | 100 |
| Republican hold | | | |

=== 2015 ===
2015 Louisiana State Senate election, District 1
| Party | Candidate | Votes | % |
|---|---|---|---|
| Republican | Sharon Hewitt | 15,537 | 59.0 |
| Republican | Pete Schneider | 10,810 | 41.0 |
| Total votes | | 26,347 | 100 |
| Republican hold | | | |

=== 2011 ===
2011 Louisiana State Senate election, District 1
| Party | Candidate | Votes | % |
|---|---|---|---|
| Republican | A. G. Crowe (incumbent) | 15,717 | 69.1 |
| Republican | Nita Hutter | 7,025 | 30.9 |
| Total votes | | 22,742 | 100 |
| Republican hold | | | |

=== Federal and statewide results ===
| Year | Office | Results |
|---|---|---|
| 2020 | President | Trump 66.1–32.2% |
| 2019 | Governor (runoff) | Rispone 55.1–44.9% |
| 2016 | President | Trump 68.2–27.7% |
| 2015 | Governor (runoff) | Vitter 54.2–45.8% |
| 2014 | Senate (runoff) | Cassidy 62.8–37.2% |
| 2012 | President | Romney 68.8–29.2% |
