= Kevin Pearson (politician) =

American politician (born 1959)

Joseph Kevin Pearson

Louisiana State Representative for District 76 (St. Tammany Parish)
- Incumbent
- Assumed office 2008
- Preceded by: A. G. Crowe

Personal details
- Born: October 1, 1959 (age 66)
- Party: Republican
- Occupation: Financial Advisor

Joseph Kevin Pearson, known as Kevin Pearson (born October 1, 1959), is a Republican member of the Louisiana House of Representatives for District 76 in eastern St. Tammany Parish, Louisiana. He was elected on November 17, 2007. The seat was previously held by the then incoming State Senator A. G. Crowe of Pearl River, also in St. Tammany Parish. Crowe retired from the Senate in January 2016 and was succeeded by Republican Sharon Hewitt.

Pearson is chairman of the House Retirement Committee. On numerous occasions, he has joined with his District 90 Republican colleague, Greg Cromer, also from Slidell in holding town meetings and hosting joint appearances regarding issues of mutual interest in both districts.

Louisiana House of Representatives
| Preceded by A. G. Crowe | Louisiana State Representative for District 76 (St. Tammany Parish); 2008– | Succeeded by Incumbent |
