= 2019 Louisiana gubernatorial election =

- October 12, 2019 (first round); November 16, 2019 (runoff)
- Turnout: 45.9% ▼ (first round); 51.0% ▲ (runoff)
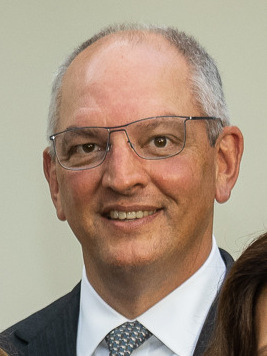

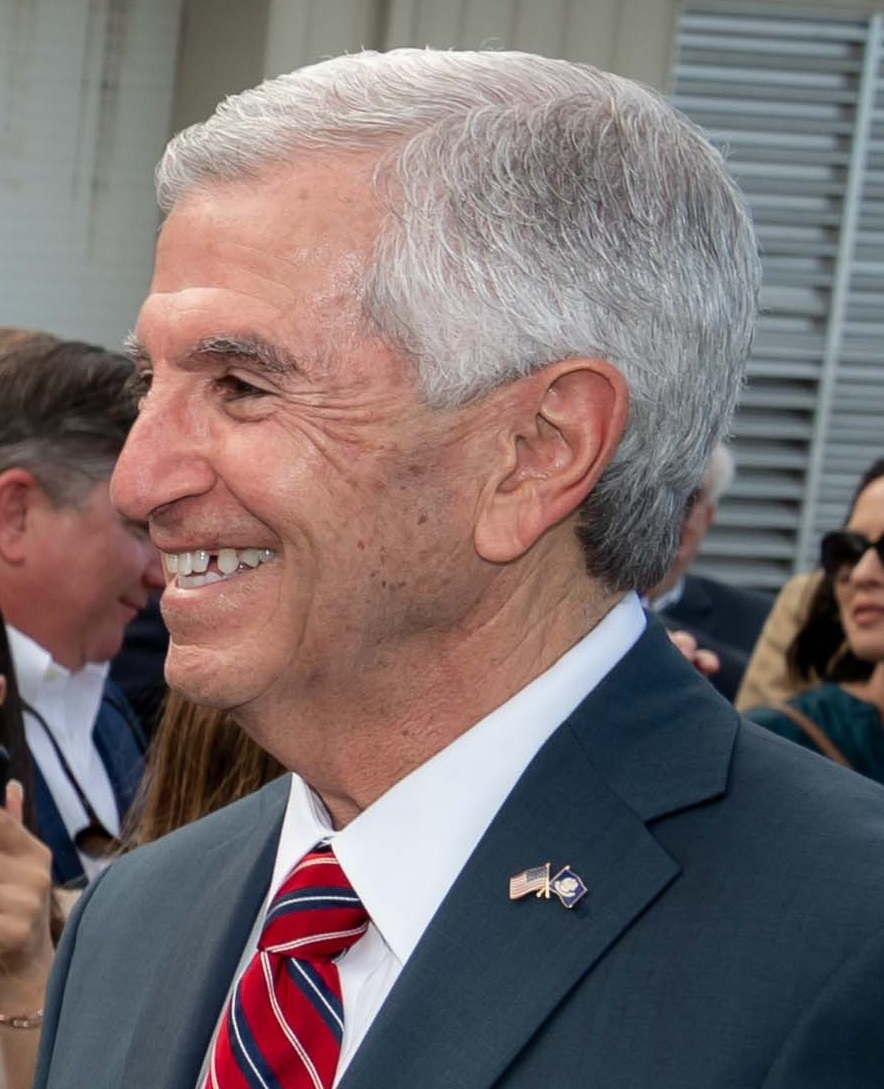

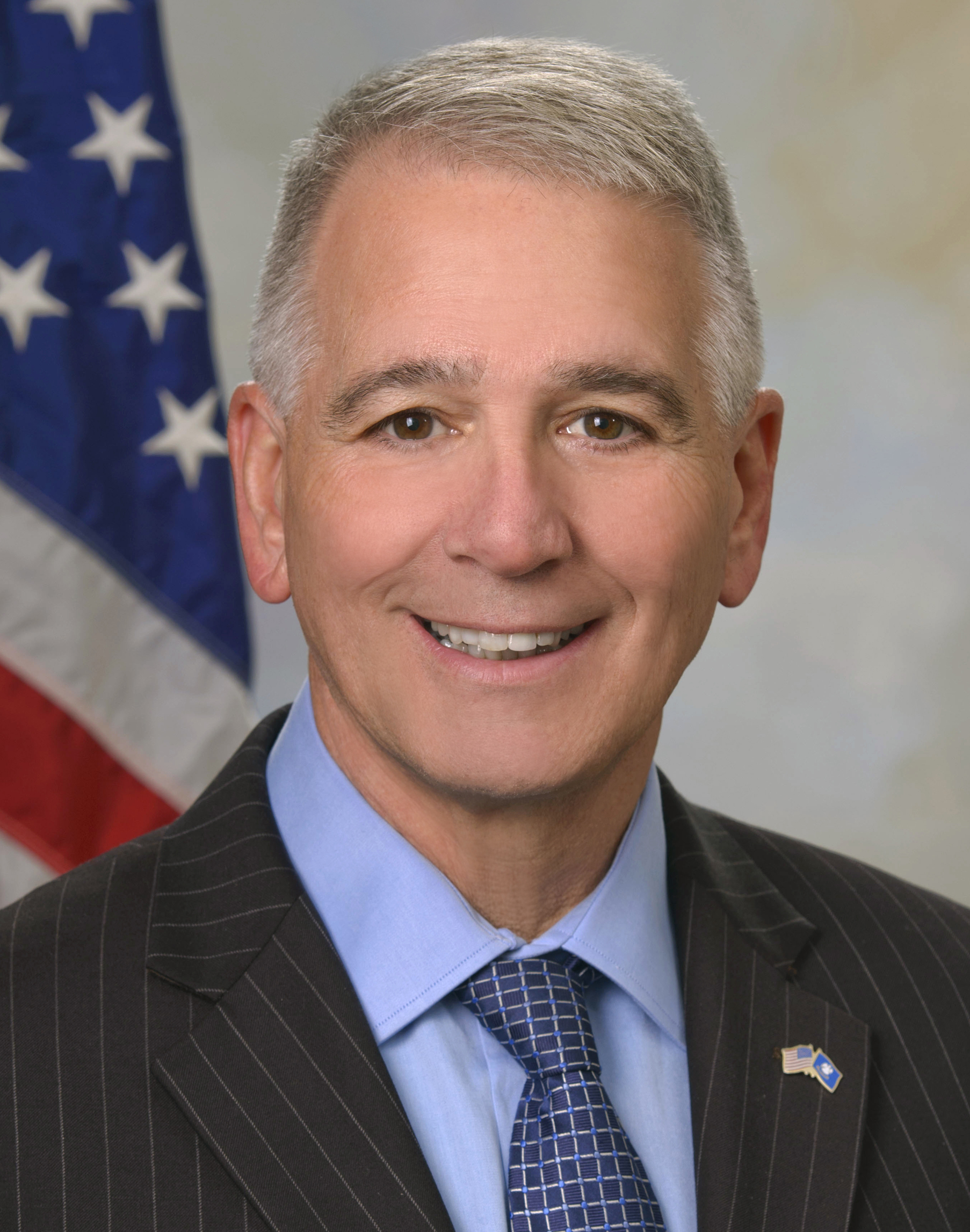
Candidate	John Bel Edwards	Eddie Rispone	Ralph Abraham
Party	Democratic	Republican	Republican
First round	625,970; 46.59%	368,319; 27.42%	317,149; 23.61%
Runoff	774,498; 51.33%	734,286; 48.67%	Eliminated
- Edwards: 30–40% 40–50% 50–60% 60–70% 70–80% 80–90% >90% Rispone: 30–40% 40–50% 50–60% 60–70% 70–80% 80–90% >90% Abraham: 30–40% 40–50% 50–60% 60–70% 70–80% 80–90% >90% Landrieu: 50–60% Tie: 30–40% 40–50% 50% No votes Edwards: 30–40% 40–50% 50–60% 60–70% 70–80% 80–90% >90% Rispone: 30–40% 40–50% 50–60% 60–70% 70–80% 80–90% >90% Abraham: 30–40% 40–50% 50–60% 60–70% 70–80% 80–90% >90% Landrieu: 50–60% Tie: 30–40% 40–50% 50% No votes Edwards: 50–60% 60–70% 70–80% 80–90% >90% Rispone: 50–60% 60–70% 70–80% 80–90% >90% Tie: 50% No votes Edwards: 50–60% 60–70% 70–80% 80–90% >90% Rispone: 50–60% 60–70% 70–80% 80–90% >90% Tie: 50% No votes Edwards: 50–60% 60–70% 70–80% 80–90% >90% Rispone: 50–60% 60–70% 70–80% 80–90% >90% Tie: 50% No votes
Governor before election
John Bel Edwards
Democratic
Elected Governor
John Bel Edwards
Democratic

The 2019 Louisiana gubernatorial election was held to elect the governor of Louisiana. Incumbent Democratic governor John Bel Edwards won re-election to a second term, defeating Republican businessman Eddie Rispone. Edwards became the first Democratic governor of Louisiana to win re-election to a second consecutive term in 44 years since Edwin Edwards (no relation) in 1975. It was the closest Louisiana gubernatorial election since 1979. This was the only Democratic-held governorship up for election in 2019 that Donald Trump won in the 2016 presidential election, and was the only statewide victory in 2019 for Democrats in Louisiana.

Under Louisiana's jungle primary system, all candidates appear on the same ballot, regardless of party, and voters may vote for any candidate regardless of their party affiliation. Because no candidate received an absolute majority of the vote during the primary election on October 12, 2019, a runoff election was held on November 16, 2019, between the top two candidates in the primary, Edwards and Rispone. Louisiana is the only state that has a jungle primary system (California and Washington have a similar top two primary system).

== Background ==
On Edwards’ Inauguration Day in 2016, State House Republicans, in a break with tradition, elected their own speaker, Representative Taylor Barras of New Iberia, over Edwards' choice, Representative Walt Leger of New Orleans. This move was said to be orchestrated by House Republican chairman Lance Harris, who was considered a potential gubernatorial 2019 candidate and was a frequent Edwards critic. Edwards and Republican Legislative leaders repeatedly clashed over budget, tax and spending measures.

Attorney General Jeff Landry, who won Louisiana’s governorship in 2023 when Edwards was term-limited, was perhaps Edwards' most prominent detractor, filing multiple lawsuits against the governor and frequently criticizing him in the media. The two disagreed the most on social policies, such as Landry's staunch opposition to Edwards' executive order providing protections for LGBT workers of state government and contractors. Landry also assumed the leadership of David Vitter's Political Action Committee, the Louisiana Committee for a Republican Majority, the organisation that was widely considered instrumental to Clay Higgins' upset Congressional victory over Scott Angelle in 2016. Landry has closely aligned with President Donald Trump and attended Trump's 2017 State of the Union speech.

Edwards also become a favorite target of U.S. representative Garret Graves, a Republican from Baton Rouge and former aide to Governor Bobby Jindal. Graves frequently criticized the governor during the state's response to the 2016 August floods in the state. The two notably sparred during a hearing of the House Committee on Oversight and Government Reform, of which Graves is a member. Edwards' aides called the exchange a "political ambush" while Graves accused the governor of lying. Graves was also closely aligned with the Trump Administration and donated $300 to the 2017 Trump Inaugural fund. Graves also accompanied Vice President Mike Pence during a visit to parts of the Baton Rouge area in May 2017.

As the only Democratic governor in the Deep South, Edwards and his agenda also been the target of numerous attacks from numerous groups affiliated with the national Republican Party such as America Rising and Americans for Prosperity. Edwards, declared himself to be unbothered by these groups, and went on to classify them as "a Washington, D.C., political action committee, trying to bring the never-ending campaign cycle to Louisiana."

Aware of their gubernatorial ambitions, Edwards and his aides repeatedly spoofed both U.S. senator John Neely Kennedy and Landry during their traditional response skits at Baton Rouge's Gridiron Show.

According to fundraising reports filed in 2016, Edwards had raised close to $3.3 million for his 2019 re-election effort. By comparison, Landry had $544,000 on hand for a potential future campaign. Graves and Kennedy had yet to form separate entities for statewide campaigns per Louisiana Law.

In the summer of 2017, Lieutenant Governor Billy Nungesser announced that he would not be a candidate for governor in 2019, and had decided to run for re-election. Nungesser said that he had disclosed his plans to run for re-election to then Governor-elect John Bel Edwards during his transition period. During the fall of 2017, U.S. representative Ralph Abraham was reported to be running polls and assembling a staff to enter the race.

== Democratic candidates ==
=== Advanced to the runoff ===
- John Bel Edwards, incumbent governor of Louisiana

=== Defeated in the jungle primary ===
- Oscar Dantzler, former police officer and businessman

=== Disqualified ===
- Vinny Mendoza, perennial candidate

== Republican candidates ==
=== Advanced to the runoff ===
- Eddie Rispone, construction executive and former chair of the Louisiana Workforce Investment Council

=== Defeated in the jungle primary ===
- Ralph Abraham, U.S. representative for Louisiana's 5th congressional district
- Patrick Landry, artist and perennial candidate

=== Declined ===
- Bret Allain, state senator
- Conrad Appel, state senator
- Charles Boustany, former U.S. representative for Louisiana's 3rd congressional district and former U.S. representative for Louisiana's 7th congressional district
- John Fleming, former U.S. representative for Louisiana's 4th congressional district
- Garret Graves, incumbent U.S. representative for Louisiana's 6th congressional district
- Lance Harris, state representative and chairman of the Louisiana House Republican Caucus
- Troy Hebert, former ATC Commissioner and state senator
- Cameron Henry, state representative
- Sharon Hewitt, state senator
- John Kennedy, incumbent U.S. senator
- Jeff Landry, attorney general of Louisiana
- Billy Nungesser, incumbent lieutenant governor of Louisiana
- Steve Scalise, incumbent U.S. representative for Louisiana's 1st congressional district
- John Schroder, Louisiana State Treasurer
- Alan Seabaugh, state representative
- Eric Skrmetta, Louisiana Public Service Commissioner

=== Disqualified ===
- Patrick Douget
- Manuel Russell Leach, contractor

== Independents ==
=== Defeated in jungle primary ===
- Gary Landrieu, businessman and perennial candidate

=== Declined ===
- John Georges, businessman and candidate for governor of Louisiana in 2007

== Jungle primary ==
=== Polling ===
View source data.

Poll source	Date(s) administered	Sample size (Note: Key: A – all adults RV – registered voters LV – likely voters V – unclear)	Margin of error	John Bel Edwards (D)	Ralph Abraham (R)	Eddie Rispone (R)	Other	Undecided
Market Research Insight	October 8–10, 2019	600 (V)	± 4.0%	52%	17%	22%	–	8%
The Trafalgar Group (R)	October 8–10, 2019	1,070 (LV)	± 2.9%	48%	23%	25%	4%	–
Data for Progress (D)	October 4–10, 2019	1,525 (LV)	± 3.4%	48%	22%	26%	3% (Note: Dantzler (D) with 1%, Landrieu (I) with 1%, and Landry (R) with 1%)	–
Spry Strategies (R) (Note: Poll sponsored by Brian Trascher, chairman of the Donald Trump 2020 presidential campaign in Louisiana)	October 8–9, 2019	700 (LV)	± 3.7%	39%	26%	25%	–	10%
JMC Analytics (R)	October 5–8, 2019	600 (LV)	± 4.0%	45%	20%	21%	6% (Note: Dantzler (D) with 3%, Landrieu (I) with 2%, and Landry (R) with 1%)	8%
Remington (R) (Note: Poll sponsored by the Ralph Abraham campaign)	October 7, 2019	–	–	42%	22%	22%	–	7%
Causeway Solutions (R)	October 7, 2019	–	–	46%	23%	20%	–	11%
Emerson College	October 4–7, 2019	467 (RV)	± 4.5%	48%	19%	25%	8% (Note: Landrieu (I) with 4%, Landry (R) with 3%, and Dantzler (D) with 1%)	–
Market Research Insight	October 1–7, 2019	600 (V)	± 4.0%	51%	19%	19%	0%	11%
JMC Analytics (R)	October 3–5, 2019	600 (LV)	± 4.0%	47%	19%	22%	4% (Note: Dantzler (D) with 2%, Landrieu (I), and Landry (R) with 1%)	8%
Mason-Dixon	October 1–4, 2019	625 (LV)	± 4.0%	45%	17%	22%	6% (Note: Landrieu (I) with 4%, Landry (R) with 2%, and Dantzler (D) with <1%)	10%
We Ask America (R)	September 24–26, 2019	600 (LV)	± 3.99%	47%	17%	23%	2% (Note: Landrieu (I) with 2%)	11%
Remington (R)	September 25, 2019	1,040	± 2.9%	47%	22%	20%	3% (Note: Dantzler (D) with 2% and Landrieu (I) with 1%)	8%
JMC Analytics (R)	September 19–21, 2019	550 (LV)	± 4.2%	46%	18%	21%	4% (Note: Dantzler (D) with 2%, Landrieu (I), and Landry (R) with <1%)	12%
JMC Analytics (R)	September 14–17, 2019	–	± 3.8%	41%	24%	16%	4% (Note: Dantzler (D) with 2%, Landrieu (I) and Landry (R) with 1%)	16%
Remington (R)	September 10–11, 2019	1,144 (LV)	± 2.9%	45%	27%	19%	3% (Note: Landrieu (I) with 2%, "Other candidates" with 1%, and Dantzler (D) with 0%)	6%
Southern Media & Opinion Research (Note: Poll conducted for undisclosed private client)	September 3–6, 2019	500 (LV)	± 4.4%	47%	24%	16%	0%	13%
Market Research Insight	August 13–16, 2019	600 (LV)	± 4.0%	52%	25%	19%	4%	0%
Multi-Quest	July 19–21, 2019	601 (RV)	± 4.0%	44%	35%	6%	5% (Note: Landrieu (I) with 4%, "Refused" with 1%)	10%
Remington (R)	June 1–2, 2019	1,471 (LV)	± 2.6%	42%	34%	8%	–	16%
JMC Analytics (R)	April 25–29, 2019	650 (LV)	± 3.8%	38%	23%	7%	–	32%
Market Research Insight	April 9–11, 2019	600 (LV)	± 4.1%	46%	17%	5%	–	32%
Remington (R)	March 13–14, 2019	1,464 (LV)	± 2.6%	44%	33%	10%	–	13%
LJR Custom Strategies (D) (Note: Poll sponsored by Education Reform Now Advocacy, the 501(c)(3) arm of Democrats for Education Reform)	January 14–27, 2019	600 (LV)	–	45%	17%	4%	1%	32%
Remington (R)	December 11–12, 2018	1,680 (LV)	± 2.4%	43%	31%	9%	–	17%

Hypothetical polling

with John Kennedy

Poll source	Date(s) administered	Sample size	Margin of error	John Bel Edwards (D)	Ralph Abraham (R)	John Kennedy (R)	Jeff Landry (R)	Eddie Rispone (R)	Undecided
SurveyUSA (R) (Note: Poll sponsored by the John Kennedy campaign)	October 15–21, 2018	605 (V)	± 4.9%	36%	6%	30%	8%	4%	18%
SurveyUSA (R)	October 15–21, 2018	605 (V)	± 4.9%	35%	–	38%	–	5%	21%
Remington (R)	September 11–12, 2018	1,615 (LV)	± 2.5%	40%	8%	37%	–	3%	12%
SurveyUSA (R)	June 19–22, 2018	600 (LV)	± 4.8%	35%	8%	35%	–	–	22%

=== Endorsements ===
Ralph Abraham (R)

U.S. presidents

- Donald Trump, 45th president of the United States (co-endorsement with Rispone)

Politicians

- Larry Bagley, state representative
- Craig Greene, Public Service Commissioner
- Lance Harris, House Majority Leader
- Clay Higgins, U.S. representative
- Frank A. Hoffmann, state representative
- Paul Hollis, state representative
- Dodie Horton, state representative
- Bob Livingston, former U.S. representative
- Jim McCrery, former U.S. representative
- Jack McFarland, state representative
- Jay Morris, state representative
- Rick Nowlin, Natchitoches Parish president
- Alan Seabaugh, state representative

Organizations

- Louisiana Association of Business and Industry
- Louisiana Oil & Gas Association
- Louisiana State Medical Society
- Republican Party of Louisiana (co-endorsement with Rispone)
- Richland Parish Chamber of Commerce
John Bel Edwards (D)

U.S. executive branch officials

- Barack Obama, 44th president of the United States

Politicians

- Stacey Abrams, 2018 Democratic nominee for governor of Georgia, former minority leader of the Georgia House of Representatives
- LaToya Cantrell, mayor of New Orleans, Louisiana
- Julian Castro, former United States Secretary of Housing and Urban Development, former mayor of San Antonio, Texas, and 2020 Democratic presidential candidate
- Katrina Jackson, former state representative
- Jamie Mayo, mayor of Monroe, Louisiana
- Paul Rainwater, former Louisiana commissioner of Administration

Individuals

- Ed Orgeron, head football coach at Louisiana State University

Organizations

- International Union of Police Associations
- Louisiana Democratic Party
- Louisiana Sheriffs' Association
- VoteVets.org
Eddie Rispone (R)

U.S. presidents

- Donald Trump, 45th president of the United States (co-endorsement with Abraham)

Politicians

- Conrad Appel, state senator
- Tony Bacala, state representative
- Johnny Berthelot, state representative
- Stuart Bishop, state representative
- Dan Claitor, state senator
- Page Cortez, state senator
- Jack Donahue, state senator
- Rick Edmonds, state representative
- Ray Garofalo, state representative
- Eddie Lambert, state senator
- Barrow Peacock, state senator
- Kevin Pearson, state representative
- Clay Schexnayder, state representative
- Kirk Talbot, state representative
- Bodi White, state senator
- Mark Wright, state representative

Individuals

- Willie Robertson, CEO of Duck Commander

Organizations

- Louisiana Association of Business and Industry
- Republican Party of Louisiana (co-endorsement with Abraham)

=== Jungle primary results ===
According to the Louisiana Secretary of State more than 384,000 early votes were cast, a significant increase from the 2015 gubernatorial election in which 234,000 early votes were cast.

2019 Louisiana gubernatorial election
Party	Candidate	Votes	%
Democratic	John Bel Edwards (incumbent)	625,970	46.59
Republican	Eddie Rispone	368,319	27.42
Republican	Ralph Abraham	317,149	23.61
Democratic	Oscar Dantzler	10,993	0.82
Republican	Patrick Landry	10,966	0.82
Independent	Gary Landrieu	10,084	0.75
Total votes		1,343,481	100

== Runoff ==
=== Debates ===
Dates	Location	John Bel Edwards	Eddie Rispone	Link
October 30, 2019	Louisiana Public Broadcasting	Participant	Participant	

=== Predictions ===
Source	Ranking	As of
The Cook Political Report	Tossup	October 15, 2019
Inside Elections	Tossup	November 8, 2019
Sabato's Crystal Ball	Lean D	November 14, 2019

=== Polling ===
View source data.

Poll source	Date(s) administered	Sample size	Margin of error	John Bel Edwards (D)	Eddie Rispone (R)	Undecided
The Trafalgar Group (R)	November 13–15, 2019	1,107 (LV)	± 2.9%	49%	51%	0%
Data for Progress	October 29 – November 14, 2019	1,434 (LV)	± 2.6%	50.2%	49.8%	0%
JMC Analytics (R)	November 12–13, 2019	600 (LV)	± 4.0%	47%	46%	7%
Targoz Market Research	November 7–13, 2019	640 (LV)	–	50% (Note: Figures use the 'likely voters with early voters and leaners' metric)	46%	4%
Edgwater Research/My People Vote	November 11, 2019	661 (LV)	± 3.8%	49%	49%	2%
Cygnal (R)	November 7–9, 2019	800 (LV)	± 3.5%	50%	48%	2%
Mason-Dixon Polling & Research Inc.	November 5–7, 2019	625 (LV)	± 4.0%	48%	46%	6%
Edgewater Research/My People Vote	October 28, 2019	722 (LV)	± 3.6%	50%	47%	3%
JMC Analytics (R)	October 24–26, 2019	600 (LV)	± 4.0%	50%	47%	4%
We Ask America (R)	October 14–16, 2019	600 (LV)	± 4.0%	47%	47%	6%
Spry Strategies (R)	October 8–9, 2019	700 (LV)	± 3.7%	41%	45%	14%
JMC Analytics (R)	October 5–8, 2019	600 (LV)	± 4.0%	48%	39%	13%
Mason-Dixon Polling & Research Inc.	October 1–4, 2019	625 (LV)	± 4.0%	51%	42%	7%
ALG Research (D) (Note: Poll sponsored by the John Bel Edwards campaign)	September 30 – October 3, 2019	900 (LV)	–	52%	36%	–
Remington (R)	September 10–11, 2019	1,144 (LV)	± 2.9%	49%	44%	7%
Market Research Insight	August 13–16, 2019	600 (LV)	± 4.0%	55%	45%	0%
Multi-Quest	July 19–21, 2019	601 (RV)	± 4.0%	49%	29%	22%
Remington (R)	June 1–2, 2019	1,471 (LV)	± 2.6%	49%	38%	13%
JMC Analytics (R)	April 25–29, 2019	650 (LV)	± 3.8%	41%	28%	31%
Market Research Insight	April 9–11, 2019	600 (LV)	± 4.1%	47%	23%	30%
Remington (R)	March 13–14, 2019	1,464 (LV)	± 2.6%	48%	42%	10%
LJR Custom Strategies (D)	January 14–27, 2019	600 (LV)	–	47%	19%	–
Remington (R)	December 11–12, 2018	1,680 (LV)	± 2.4%	46%	39%	15%
SurveyUSA (R)	October 15–21, 2018	605 (V)	± 4.9%	47%	33%	19%
Remington (R)	September 11–12, 2018	1,615 (LV)	± 2.5%	52%	29%	19%

Hypothetical polling

with Ralph Abraham

Poll source	Date(s) administered	Sample size	Margin of error	John Bel Edwards (D)	Ralph Abraham (R)	Undecided
Spry Strategies (R)	October 8–9, 2019	700 (LV)	± 3.7%	43%	45%	12%
JMC Analytics (R)	October 5–8, 2019	600 (LV)	± 4.0%	47%	37%	16%
Mason-Dixon	October 1–4, 2019	625 (LV)	± 4.0%	53%	38%	9%
Remington (R)	September 10–11, 2019	1,144 (LV)	± 2.9%	48%	44%	8%
Market Research Insight	August 13–16, 2019	600 (LV)	± 4.0%	53%	47%	0%
Multi-Quest	July 19–21, 2019	601 (RV)	± 4.0%	49%	39%	11%
Remington (R)	June 1–2, 2019	1,471 (LV)	± 2.6%	45%	45%	10%
JMC Analytics (R)	April 25–29, 2019	650 (LV)	± 3.8%	40%	36%	24%
Market Research Insight	April 9–11, 2019	600 (LV)	± 4.1%	45%	28%	27%
Remington (R)	March 13–14, 2019	1,464 (LV)	± 2.6%	47%	45%	8%
LJR Custom Strategies (D)	January 14–27, 2019	600 (LV)	–	47%	27%	–
Remington (R)	December 11–12, 2018	1,680 (LV)	± 2.4%	44%	44%	12%
SurveyUSA (R)	October 15–21, 2018	605 (V)	± 4.9%	45%	37%	18%
Remington (R)	September 11–12, 2018	1,615 (LV)	± 2.5%	48%	35%	17%
Mason-Dixon	February 20–22, 2018	625 (RV)	± 4.0%	51%	28%	21%

with John Kennedy

Poll source	Date(s) administered	Sample size	Margin of error	John Bel Edwards (D)	John Kennedy (R)	Undecided
Southern Media & Opinion Research	November 16–21, 2018	500	± 4.4%	45%	49%	6%
SurveyUSA (R)	October 15–21, 2018	605 (V)	± 4.9%	39%	48%	14%
Remington (R)	September 11–12, 2018	1,615 (LV)	± 2.5%	43%	47%	10%
SurveyUSA (R)	June 19–22, 2018	600 (LV)	± 4.8%	37%	51%	–
Mason-Dixon	February 20–22, 2018	625 (RV)	± 4.0%	45%	44%	11%

with Jeff Landry

Poll source	Date(s) administered	Sample size	Margin of error	John Bel Edwards (D)	Jeff Landry (R)	Undecided
SurveyUSA (R)	October 15–21, 2018	605 (V)	± 4.9%	44%	39%	17%

with Steve Scalise

Poll source	Date(s) administered	Sample size	Margin of error	John Bel Edwards (D)	Steve Scalise (R)	Undecided
Market Research Insight	April 9–11, 2019	600 (LV)	± 4.1%	45%	26%	29%
Mason-Dixon	February 20–22, 2018	625 (RV)	± 4.0%	46%	43%	11%

with Generic Opponent

Poll source	Date(s) administered	Sample size	Margin of error	John Bel Edwards (D)	Generic Opponent	Undecided
Remington Research Group/Abraham for Governor (Note: Poll sponsored by Abraham's campaign)	June 1–2, 2019	1,471 (LV)	± 2.6%	42%	48% (Note: "We should give someone new a chance" with 48% as opposed to "Edwards has done a good enough job as Governor to be re-elected")	10%
Market Research Insight	Apr 9–11, 2019	600 (LV)	± 4.1%	36%	42%	22%
SurveyUSA (R)	June 19–22, 2018	600 (LV)	± 4.8%	35%	–	65% (Note: "Would consider voting for someone else" with 51% as opposed to "would vote to re-elect Edwards"; "unsure" with 14%)

=== Results ===
2019 Louisiana gubernatorial election runoff
Party	Candidate	Votes	%	±%
Democratic	John Bel Edwards (incumbent)	774,498	51.33%	−4.78%
Republican	Eddie Rispone	734,286	48.67%	+4.78%
Total votes		1,508,784	100%	N/A
Democratic hold				

==== Parishes that flipped from Democratic to Republican ====
- Allen (largest city: Oakdale)
- Ascension (largest city: Prairieville)
- Avoyelles (largest city: Marksville)
- Calcasieu (largest city: Lake Charles)
- Claiborne (largest city: Homer)
- Concordia (largest city: Vidalia)
- De Soto (largest city: Mansfield)
- Evangeline (largest city: Ville Platte)
- Jefferson Davis (largest city: Jennings)
- Lincoln (largest city: Ruston)
- Rapides (largest city: Alexandria)
- St. Martin (largest city: Breaux Bridge)
- St. Mary (largest city: Morgan City)
- Washington (largest city: Bogalusa)
- Webster (largest city: Minden)

==== By congressional district ====
Despite losing the state, Rispone won five of six congressional districts.

District	Bel Edwards	Rispone	Representative
1st	45%	55%	Steve Scalise
2nd	84%	16%	Cedric Richmond
3rd	40%	60%	Clay Higgins
4th	45%	55%	Mike Johnson
5th	45%	55%	Ralph Abraham
6th	49%	51%	Garret Graves

== See also ==
- 2019 Louisiana elections

== Notes ==
Partisan clients

Additional candidates and polling key
