= Louisiana's 76th House of Representatives district =

American legislative district

Louisiana's 76th State House of Representatives district
Representative
Stephanie Berault; R–Slidell

Louisiana's 76th House of Representatives district is one of 105 Louisiana House of Representatives districts. It is currently represented by Republican Stephanie Berault of Slidell.

== Geography ==
HD76 makes part of the eastern boder edge of Louisiana. It also includes parts of the town of Pearl River and city of Slidell.

== Election results ==
Year	Winning candidate	Party	Percent	Opponent	Party	Percent
2011	J. Kevin Pearson	Republican	100%			
2015	J. Kevin Pearson	Republican	100%			
2019	Robert Owen	Republican	52.4%	S. Michelle Blanchard	Republican	47.6%
2023	Stephanie Berault	Republican	79.4%	Shawn Jones	Republican	20.6%
