= Louisiana Highway 3081 =

State highway in Louisiana, United States

Louisiana Highway 3081

Route information
- Maintained by Louisiana DOTD
- Length: 2.2 mi (3.5 km)
- Existed: 1965–present

Major junctions
- South end: US 11 / LA 41 in Pearl River
- North end: I-59 / US 11 in Pearl River

Location
- Country: United States
- State: Louisiana
- Parishes: St. Tammany

Highway system
- Louisiana State Highway System; Interstate; US; State; Scenic
← LA 3080	→ LA 3082

Louisiana Highway 3081 (LA 3081) is a state highway in Louisiana that serves St. Tammany Parish. It spans a total of 2.2 miles (3.5 km) largely over a former alignment of both U.S. 11 and U.S. 90 in the town of Pearl River.

== Route description ==
From the south, LA 3081 begins at an intersection with U.S. 11 and LA 41 (Watts Road) near the southern limit of Pearl River. It heads northward along Main Street, paralleling Interstate 59 (I-59) and U.S. 11 to the west, to a junction with LA 3081 Spur at Pine Street. At this point, the route turns east briefly to an interchange with southbound I-59 and U.S. 11, which are concurrent. LA 3081 then turns northeast alongside the interstate, looping back southwest underneath the I-59/U.S. 11 West Pearl River bridge to the other half of the interchange, serving northbound I-59/U.S. 11 traffic, and reaching its northern terminus.

LA 3081 is an undivided, two-lane highway for its entire length.

== History ==
The portion of LA 3081 running along Main Street through Pearl River was originally part of the Old Spanish Trail, designated as State Route 2 from 1921 until the 1955 Louisiana Highway renumbering. The route headed north along Main Street, crossed a bridge over the West Pearl River, and proceeded northeast along the road now known as Old U.S. 11 to a second bridge over the Pearl River at the Mississippi state line. In 1926, this became the original route of U.S. 90 (at first, concurrent with LA 2 across the state of Louisiana). After U.S. 90 assumed its current alignment between the Rigolets Bridge and Pearlington, Mississippi, U.S. 11 was extended from its former terminus in Mississippi and assigned to the route in 1938.

In 1964, concerns over the safety of the U.S. 11 West Pearl River Bridge, built in 1926, led to its closure, and U.S. 11 was detoured onto the recently opened, parallel I-59. This re-routing was made permanent the following year, and the old route north to its junction with I-59/U.S. 11 at Exit 5B was designated as LA 3081. (The remainder of Old U.S. 11 to the Mississippi state line became a local road until its abandonment in the early 1970s.) The West Pearl River Bridge was reconditioned in 1968 to serve local traffic until the interchange of I-59/U.S. 11 with LA 41 (later LA 41 Spur) was constructed nearby (Exit 5A). Once completed, the West Pearl River Bridge was abandoned, and LA 3081 was shortened to a terminus at the west bank of the river.

In 2007, LA 41 Spur was eliminated, and LA 3081 assumed part of its route, turning east to the interchange with I-59/U.S. 11 at Exit 5A. The former route of LA 3081 north to the dead-end at the West Pearl River was then designated as LA 3081 Spur.

== Major junctions ==
The entire route is in Pearl River, St. Tammany Parish.

mi	km	Destinations	Notes
0.0	0.0	US 11 / LA 41 north (Watts Road) – Slidell, Hattiesburg	Southern terminus of LA 41
1.2	1.9	LA 3081 Spur north (Main Street)	Southern terminus of LA 3081 Spur
1.3	2.1	I-59 / US 11 south – New Orleans	Exit 5A (I-59); southbound entrance and exit
2.2	3.5	I-59 / US 11 north – Hattiesburg	Exit 5A (I-59); northbound entrance and exit
1.000 mi = 1.609 km; 1.000 km = 0.621 mi

== Louisiana Highway 3081 Spur ==
Louisiana Highway 3081 Spur
- Location: Pearl River
- Length: 0.3 mi (480 m)
- Existed: 2007–present

Louisiana Highway 3081 Spur (LA 3081 Spur) is a state highway in Louisiana that serves St. Tammany Parish. It spans 0.3 miles (0.48 km) in the town of Pearl River, proceeding north along Main Street from a junction with its parent route to a dead-end at the West Pearl River.

LA 3081 Spur covers the part of LA 3081 that was given up when that highway was re-routed in 2007 along part of former LA 41 Spur.

LA 3081 Spur is an undivided, two-lane highway for its entire length.

The entire highway is in Pearl River, St. Tammany Parish.

mi	km	Destinations	Notes
0.0	0.0	LA 3081	
0.3	0.48	Dead-end at West Pearl River	
1.000 mi = 1.609 km; 1.000 km = 0.621 mi
