= Louisiana's 90th House of Representatives district =

American legislative district

Louisiana's 90th State House of Representatives district
Representative
Brian Glorioso; R–Slidell

Louisiana's 90th House of Representatives district is one of 105 Louisiana House of Representatives districts. It is currently represented by Republican Brian Glorioso.

== Geography ==
HD90 includes the City of Slidell, The town of Pearl River and the census-designated places of Eden Isle.

== Election results ==
Year	Winning candidate	Party	Percent	Opponent	Party	Percent
2011	George Cromer	Republican	74.9%	Ron Eldridge	Republican	25.1%
2015	George Cromer	Republican	100%			
2018*	Mary DuBuisson	Republican	60.9%	John Raymond	Republican	39.1%
2019	Mary DuBisson	Republican	60.4%	John Raymond	Republican	29.9%
2023	Brian Glorioso	Republican	56.6%	Mary DuBisson	Republican	43.4%

"*" indicates Special Election.
