= Louisiana Highway 3082 =

State highway in Louisiana, United States

Louisiana Highway 3082
- LA 3082 highlighted in red on a modern map

Route information
- Maintained by Louisiana DOTD
- Length: 6.2 mi (10.0 km)
- Existed: 1962–1967

Major junctions
- West end: LA 39 / LA 3021 in New Orleans
- East end: LA 47 in Chalmette

Location
- Country: United States
- State: Louisiana
- Parishes: Orleans, St. Bernard

Highway system
- Louisiana State Highway System; Interstate; US; State; Scenic
← LA 3081	→ LA 3083

Louisiana Highway 3082 (LA 3082) was a state highway in Louisiana that served Orleans and St. Bernard Parishes. It spanned 6.2 miles (10.0 km) in a west–east direction along the present route of LA 39 between New Orleans and Chalmette. It was essentially a temporary designation for the relocation of LA 39 north (west) of LA 47.

== Route description ==
From the west, LA 3082 began at a junction with LA 39 and LA 3021 at the intersection of Elysian Fields and North Claiborne Avenues in New Orleans. As North Claiborne narrows to two lanes east of Elysian Fields, LA 3082 proceeded eastward along a transition from North Claiborne Avenue onto parallel North Robertson Street and followed that street to the Claiborne Avenue Bridge, where it rejoined North Claiborne Avenue to cross the Industrial Canal. Westbound traffic followed North Claiborne Avenue throughout.

East of the Industrial Canal, LA 3082 continued along North Claiborne Avenue to the Orleans-St. Bernard Parish line where it crossed from New Orleans into Arabi. Here the local name changed to West Goodchildren Street (now West Judge Perez Drive), and LA 3082 continued east into Chalmette to a terminus at LA 47 (Paris Road).

LA 3082 was a divided, four-lane highway for its entire length.

== History ==
LA 3082 was the short-lived designation for the relocation of LA 39 between New Orleans and Chalmette in the mid-1960s. The project called for the improvement and widening of North Claiborne Avenue as a four-lane thoroughfare from Elysian Fields Avenue east to Paris Road in Chalmette. Earlier improvements along the corridor resulted in the construction of two bridges: a two-lane overpass for North Claiborne across the Press Street railroad yard (opened in 1951) and a four-lane vertical lift bridge across the Industrial Canal (the Judge Seeber or Claiborne Avenue Bridge, opened in 1957). The railroad overpass originated as part of a citywide grade separation program approved in 1947 connected with the construction of the Union Passenger Terminal. The Industrial Canal bridge was added to relieve the traffic congestion on nearby St. Claude Avenue and provide an alternate route during times when the bascule bridge on that thoroughfare was in the raised position.

In 1961, the state highway department prepared further improvements to the corridor. The railroad overpass on North Robertson Street opened parallel to that on North Claiborne Avenue the following year. This alleviated a traffic bottleneck by allowing the two-lane section of North Claiborne Avenue between Elysian Fields Avenue and the Industrial Canal bridge to carry westbound traffic exclusively with eastbound traffic now following North Robertson Street. Work then focused on extending North Claiborne Avenue from Caffin Avenue on the east side of the Industrial Canal bridge to LA 47 (Paris Road) in Chalmette, completed in September 1967.

Upon completion, this became the new route of LA 39, and LA 3082 was decommissioned. The route of LA 46 was then extended to cover the former route of LA 39. From its original western terminus in Poydras, LA 46 now followed St. Bernard Highway to LA 47 (Paris Road) co-signed with LA 39. At this point, LA 39 zigzagged onto the new alignment while LA 46 continued along the old alignment, following St. Claude and Elysian Fields Avenues to North Claiborne Avenue as it does today. Except for a short stretch at Poydras, this concurrency was eliminated once LA 39 was moved onto two further extensions of Judge Perez Drive: from Chalmette to Violet in 1975 and from Violet to Poydras in 1981.

== Major intersections ==
Parish	Location	mi	km	Destinations	Notes
Orleans	New Orleans	0.0	0.0	LA 39 / LA 3021 north (North Claiborne Avenue, Elysian Fields Avenue)	Western terminus; Southern terminus of LA 3021
Orleans	New Orleans	0.6	0.97	Bridge over Press Street Railroad Yard	
Orleans	New Orleans	1.7	2.7	Claiborne Avenue Bridge over Industrial Canal	
St. Bernard	Chalmette	6.2	10.0	LA 47 (Paris Road)	Eastern terminus
1.000 mi = 1.609 km; 1.000 km = 0.621 mi
