= Ralph Abraham (politician) =

American physician and politician (born 1954)

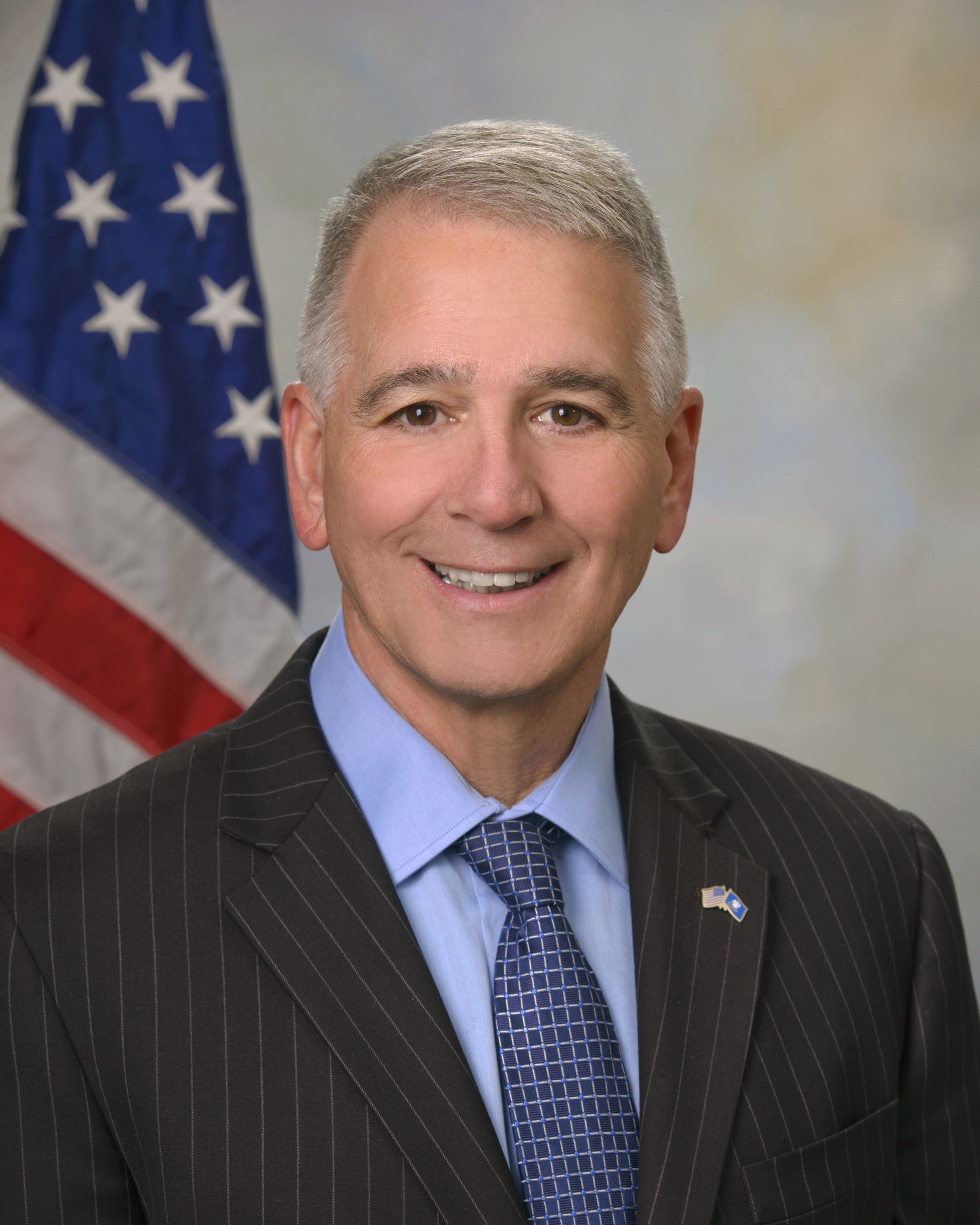
- Official portrait, 2015

Principal Deputy Director of the Centers for Disease Control and Prevention
- In office December 15, 2025 – February 23, 2026
- President: Donald Trump
- Director: Jim O'Neill (acting); Jay Bhattacharya (acting)
- Preceded by: Nirav D. Shah
- Succeeded by: Sean Slovenski

Surgeon General of the Louisiana Department of Health
- In office January 8, 2024 – December 15, 2025
- Governor: Jeff Landry
- Preceded by: Courtney Phillips
- Succeeded by: Evelyn Griffin

Member of the U.S. House of Representatives from Louisiana's 5th district
- In office January 3, 2015 – January 3, 2021
- Preceded by: Vance McAllister
- Succeeded by: Julia Letlow (Note: Luke Letlow was elected to succeed Abraham, but died on December 29, 2020 before taking office. Julia Letlow then won the special election.)

Personal details
- Born: Ralph Lee Abraham Jr. September 16, 1954 (age 72) Alto, Louisiana, U.S.
- Party: Republican
- Spouse: Dianne Abraham (m. 1977)
- Children: 3
- Education: Louisiana State University (BA, DVM); Louisiana State University, New Orleans (MD)

Military service
- Branch/service: United States Army; United States Coast Guard
- Rank: First lieutenant
- Unit: Mississippi Army National Guard; United States Coast Guard Auxiliary

Ralph Lee Abraham Jr. (born September 16, 1954) is an American veterinarian, physician, and politician who served as the principal deputy director of the Centers for Disease Control and Prevention from December 2025 to February 2026. Prior to that, he was Louisiana Surgeon General from 2024 to 2025. He served as the U.S. representative for Louisiana's 5th congressional district from 2015 to 2021 as a member of the Republican Party. Abraham ran for governor of Louisiana in 2019, but failed to advance to the runoff.

== Early life, education, and career ==
Abraham is the son of Marlene Posey, a retired educator, and Ralph Abraham Sr. His paternal grandparents were emigrants from Lebanon. He is a native and resident of Alto, Louisiana.

He graduated from Louisiana State University School of Veterinary Medicine in 1980 and was a practicing veterinarian for ten years. He returned to Louisiana State University School of Medicine for a medical degree in 1994.

Abraham has served in the United States Coast Guard Auxiliary and the Mississippi National Guard. He and his wife, Dianne, have three children. He has been an aviation medical examiner.

== U.S. House of Representatives ==
=== Elections ===
2014

Abraham defeated his Democratic opponent, Mayor Jamie Mayo of Monroe, 134,612 votes (64.2%) to 75,004 (35.8%). He was sworn into office on January 3, 2015.

2016

In his bid for reelection, Abraham defeated one challenger, fellow Republican Billy Burkette of Baton Rouge, a former constable in East Feliciana Parish and former chairman of the Louisiana Band of Choctaw Indians. Burkette claimed in his campaign that the Environmental Protection Agency had issued overly strict regulations that hamper farming.

2018

Abraham defeated three challengers in 2018: Billy Burkette, an Independent from Pride, Louisiana; Jessee Carlton Fleenor, a Democrat from Loranger, and Kyle Randol, a Libertarian from Monroe. Abraham polled 149,010 votes (67%) to Fleenor's 67,113 votes (30%). Burkette and Randol received the remaining 3%.

=== Tenure ===
After his election, Abraham chose Luke Letlow, his campaign manager, as chief of staff.

In June 2017, Abraham co-sponsored the Civil Rights Uniformity Act of 2017.

In August 2017, Abraham endorsed President Donald Trump's nomination of Terry Doughty, also of Richland Parish, for a seat on the United States District Court for the Western District of Louisiana, based in Monroe. The selection also carried the backing of U.S. Senators Bill Cassidy and John Neely Kennedy.

In December 2017, Abraham voted for the Tax Cuts and Jobs Act. After voting, he said, "This is going to be a great tax bill, and great tax reform not only for Louisiana but for the United States." He said businesses would benefit greatly and be able to "reinvest in their infrastructure, reinvest in their employees", and that wages would increase and job opportunities grow.

In 2020, Abraham opted not to run for reelection, and endorsed Letlow in the election to succeed him. Letlow won the election, but died from COVID-19 complications a few days before he was scheduled to take office. Letlow's widow, Julia, won the special election to fill the vacancy.

=== Committee assignments ===
- Committee on Agriculture
  - Subcommittee on Conservation and Forestry
  - Subcommittee on General Farm Commodities and Risk Management
- Committee on Science, Space and Technology
  - Subcommittee on Space
  - Subcommittee on Research and Technology
  - Subcommittee on Oversight
- United States House Committee on Armed Services
  - Subcommittee on Emerging Threats and Capabilities
  - Subcommittee on Seapower and Projection Forces
  - Subcommittee on Military Personnel

=== Caucus memberships ===
- Congressional Western Caucus
- Coast Guard Caucus
- Historic Preservation Caucus
- GOP Doctor's Caucus
- Mississippi River Caucus
- Congressional National Guard and Reserve Components Caucus
- National Guard Youth Challenge Caucus
- Congressional Sportsmen's Caucus
- Veteran's Caucus
- Veterinary Medicine Caucus
- U.S.-Japan Caucus

=== Gubernatorial campaign ===
On December 6, 2018, Abraham declared his candidacy for governor of Louisiana in the 2019 Louisiana gubernatorial election. He placed third, behind fellow Republican Eddie Rispone and Democratic incumbent John Bel Edwards, failing to advance to the runoff required under Louisiana law as no candidate received a majority in the primary.

== Later career ==
He was appointed Louisiana Surgeon General in 2024. During his tenure, he instructed the Louisiana Department of Health to stop promoting mass vaccination.

On November 23, 2025, Abraham was named Principal Deputy Director of the Centers for Disease Control and Prevention. He was sworn in on December 15. Abraham resigned on February 23, 2026.

== Political positions ==
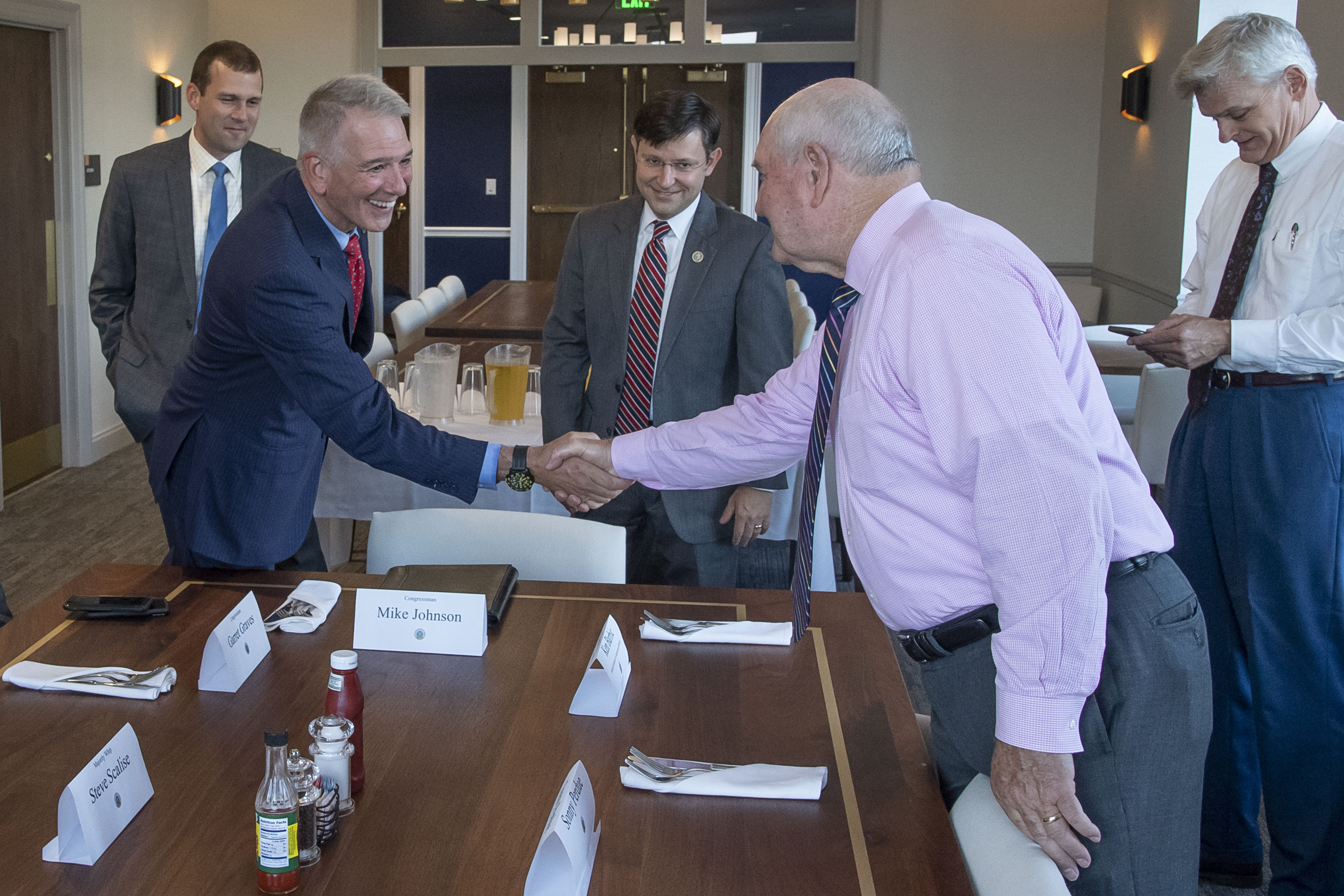
Abraham greeting Secretary of Agriculture Sonny Perdue in 2018

=== Health care and public health ===
During his 2014 campaign for the U.S. House of Representatives, Abraham said the Affordable Care Act should be repealed. He opposed the expansion of Medicaid.

On the topic of COVID-19, Abraham has said that masking, lockdowns and vaccination requirements "were practically ineffective." He said that the adverse effects of COVID vaccines were "suppressed", that "we don't know" whether recipients of COVID vaccines can safely donate blood, and suggested that COVID vaccines may be linked to miscarriages.

As Surgeon General of Louisiana, Abraham issued a directive in February 2025 instructing Louisiana state workers to end long-standing mass vaccination clinics and stop promoting seasonal vaccines. During the subsequent outbreak of pertussis (whooping cough), which included a number of infant deaths, the Louisiana Department of Health delayed action for several months.

=== Economic issues ===
Abraham supports simplifying the tax code.

He supports equal pay for women.

=== Energy policy ===
Abraham is in favor of the Keystone Pipeline.

=== Immigration ===
Regarding illegal immigration, Abraham opposed amnesty and supported strengthening border security. He supported Trump's 2017 executive order to temporarily halt immigration from seven specified nations until the development of more enhanced screening methods. His spokesman said, "Dr. Abraham generally supports President Trump's temporary suspension of the refugee and immigration admittance program. Dr. Abraham agrees with President Trump that we must take all necessary steps to protect American citizens from potential terrorism threats, and this temporary measure from the President will allow for a thorough review of our policies and procedures for vetting applicants from war-torn areas."

Abraham has said he supports banning sanctuary cities in Louisiana, and that he would pay for four minority congresswomen, three of whom were born in the U.S., to leave the United States, if they would tell him where they'd like to go, referencing Trump's "send them back" comments.

=== Death penalty ===
In 2019, Abraham said he supports the death penalty and as governor would find a way to resume executions in the state, expanding the penalty to apply to child molesters. At that point, Louisiana had not executed anyone since 2010. The state resumed executions in 2025.

=== Abortion ===
Abraham opposes late term abortions. In May 2015, he said there was "scientific research showing that babies can indeed feel pain at 20 weeks, if not before".

=== LGBT issues ===
In July 2017, after President Trump said he would ban transgender people from the military, Abraham said he backed Trump "100 percent" on this matter. In August 2019, Abraham released a campaign video, declaring certain "truths": "Facts matter more than feelings. The Second Amendment is self-explanatory. And as a doctor, I can assure you, there are only two genders." He was not in office when the Louisiana Legislature passed a ban on gender-affirming care for minors in 2023.

== See also ==
- List of Arab and Middle-Eastern Americans in the United States Congress

U.S. House of Representatives
Preceded by Vance McAllister	Member of the U.S. House of Representatives from Louisiana's 5th congressional district 2015–2021	Succeeded by Luke Letlow; Elect
Preceded by Vance McAllister	Member of the U.S. House of Representatives from Louisiana's 5th congressional district 2015–2021	Succeeded by Julia Letlow
U.S. order of precedence (ceremonial)
Preceded by Charlie Melancon as Former U.S. Representative	Order of precedence of the United States as Former U.S. Representative	Succeeded by Jill Long Thompson as Former U.S. Representative
