= A. G. Crowe =

American politician (born 1948)

Member of the Louisiana State Senate from the 1st district
- In office 2008–2016
- Preceded by: Walter Boasso
- Succeeded by: Sharon Hewitt

Member of the Louisiana House of Representatives from the 76th district
- In office 2000–2008

Personal details
- Born: Almond Gaston Crowe Jr. May 8, 1948 (age 78) New Orleans, Louisiana, U.S.
- Party: Republican
- Education: Southeastern Louisiana University
- Occupation: Businessman

Almond Gaston "A. G." Crowe Jr. (born May 8, 1948) is an American politician and businessman from Pearl River, Louisiana. A Republican, he served in the Louisiana House of Representatives from 2000 to 2008 and in the Louisiana State Senate from 2008 to 2016.

== Early life and business career ==
Crowe graduated from Francis T. Nicholls High School in New Orleans in 1966 and earned a bachelor's degree in business administration from Southeastern Louisiana University in 1973. He founded St. Tammany Office Products in 1982 and later founded The File Depot, a records-management company.

== Political career ==
Before serving in the state legislature, Crowe was a member of the St. Tammany Parish School Board.

Crowe represented the 76th district in the Louisiana House of Representatives from 2000 to 2008. He was elected to the Louisiana State Senate in 2007 from District 1, defeating Democrat Kenneth L. Odinet Sr. The official returns gave Crowe 11,625 votes, or 51.81%, and Odinet 10,811 votes, or 48.19%. Crowe served in the Senate from 2008 to 2016.

Legislation sponsored by Crowe that became law included a 2008 bill creating the Louisiana International Deep Water Gulf Transfer Terminal Authority and a 2014 bill requiring the Louisiana Board of Elementary and Secondary Education to develop a master plan for K–12 education.

== 2018 secretary of state campaign ==
In 2018, Crowe ran in the special election for Secretary of State of Louisiana. He received 4.91% of the vote in the November 6 primary and did not advance to the runoff.
