= John Bel Edwards =

American politician (born 1966)

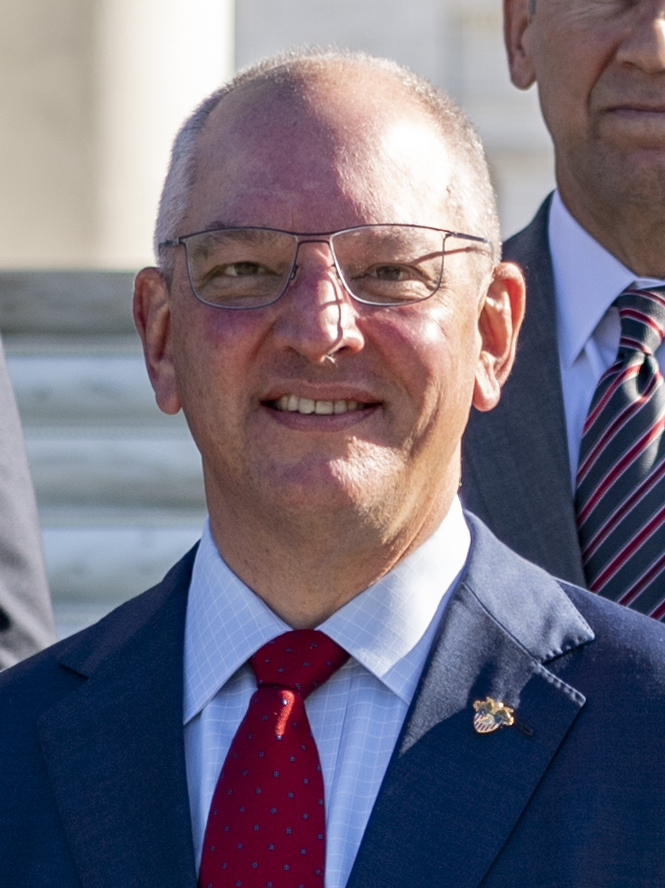
- Edwards in 2021

56th Governor of Louisiana
- In office January 11, 2016 – January 8, 2024
- Lieutenant: Billy Nungesser
- Preceded by: Bobby Jindal
- Succeeded by: Jeff Landry

Minority Leader of the Louisiana House of Representatives
- In office January 10, 2012 – December 10, 2015
- Preceded by: Jane Smith
- Succeeded by: Gene Reynolds

Member of the Louisiana House of Representatives from the 72nd district
- In office January 14, 2008 – December 10, 2015
- Preceded by: Robby Carter
- Succeeded by: Robby Carter

Personal details
- Born: September 16, 1966 (age 60) East Baton Rouge Parish, Louisiana, U.S.
- Party: Democratic
- Spouse: Donna Hutto (m. 1989)
- Children: 3
- Education: United States Military Academy (BS); Louisiana State University (JD)

Military service
- Allegiance: United States
- Branch/service: United States Army
- Years of service: 1988–1996
- Rank: Captain
- Unit: 25th Infantry Division; 82nd Airborne Division

John Bel Edwards (born September 16, 1966) is an American politician and attorney who served as the 56th governor of Louisiana from 2016 to 2024. A Southern Democrat, he previously served in the Louisiana House of Representatives from 2008 to 2015. Edwards represented parts of the Florida Parishes and served as minority leader from 2012 to 2015.

Edwards graduated from the United States Military Academy in 1988 with a Bachelor of Science in engineering and served in the United States Army as an infantry officer for eight years. In 1996, he was honorably discharged with the rank of Captain. After leaving the Army, Edwards attended and graduated from LSU Law. Following his tenure as a law clerk to Judge James L. Dennis, he returned home to Amite and began his career as a lawyer in private practice.

First elected to the Louisiana House in 2007, Edwards became Democratic minority leader in 2012. He defeated Republican U.S. Senator David Vitter in the second round of the 2015 gubernatorial election and became Louisiana governor in January 2016. During his first term, Edwards expanded protections for LGBTQ people in the workplace, enacted Medicaid expansion, signed legislation to reduce Louisiana's prison population, and implemented a six-week abortion ban. He won a second term in 2019, becoming the first Democrat to win reelection as governor of Louisiana since Edwin Edwards (no relation) in 1975. In his second term, Edwards was governor during the COVID-19 pandemic, as well as during Hurricane Ida and Hurricane Nicholas. He also signed legislation requiring public schools to display the national motto, "In God We Trust", in classrooms.

Some political observers have described Edwards as a conservative Democrat. Edwards has also been described as a moderate and as a populist. As of 2026, he is the most recent Democrat to win or hold statewide office in Louisiana.

== Early life and education ==
John Bel Edwards was born in East Baton Rouge Parish, Louisiana on September 16, 1966. The seventh of eight children, he is a son of Tangipahoa Parish Sheriff Frank M. Edwards, Jr. and Dora Jean Edwards. He was raised Catholic near Amite, Louisiana. Edwards graduated from Amite High School in 1984 as valedictorian.

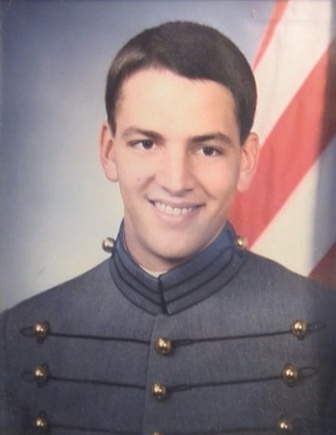
Edwards as a West Point cadet

In 1988, Edwards received a Bachelor of Science in engineering from the United States Military Academy. While there, he made the Dean's List and served as vice chairman of the panel that enforced the West Point honor code.

Edwards served in the United States Army for eight years, mostly in the 25th Infantry Division and 82nd Airborne Division. He commanded a company in the 82nd's 3rd Brigade, 505th Parachute Infantry Regiment. Edwards ultimately ended his military career to return to Louisiana because of a health situation involving one of his children.

== Legal career ==
After leaving the Army, Edwards pursued a legal education at Louisiana State University's Paul M. Hebert Law Center (LSU Law). He received his J.D. degree in 1999. After graduation, he clerked for Judge James L. Dennis of the United States Court of Appeals for the Fifth Circuit.

Edwards went on to become a practicing attorney with the Edwards & Associates law firm in Amite. He handled a variety of cases, but did not practice criminal law because his brother was the local sheriff. His nephew, Bradley Stevens, worked at the firm as a law partner.

After completing his second term as governor in 2024, Edwards joined the New Orleans–based law firm Fishman Haygood LLP. There, his practice focuses primarily on renewable energy litigation.

== Louisiana House of Representatives ==
In 2007, Edwards ran for a seat in the Louisiana House of Representatives and was forced into a general election runoff with fellow attorney George Tucker. Edwards won every parish in the district. He was the only freshman lawmaker to chair a committee, the Veterans Affairs Committee, in the legislature. Edwards was also selected as chair of the Democratic House caucus, a rarity for a freshman legislator. Edwards criticized Governor Bobby Jindal for his frequent trips away from Louisiana to raise funds for Republicans elsewhere while Louisiana had been reducing its funding for higher education.

In 2011, Edwards was reelected to the Louisiana House of Representatives, defeating Johnny Duncan, 83% to 17%. He chaired the Louisiana House Democratic Caucus, making him the House Minority Leader. Cities and towns that Edwards represented included Amite, Greensburg, and Kentwood as well as part of Hammond.

== Governor of Louisiana ==
=== Elections ===
==== 2015 ====
On February 21, 2013, Edwards announced his candidacy for governor in 2015. He said that Louisiana needed "a healthy dose of common sense and compassion for ordinary people". The only major Democrat in the race, Edwards polled first in the nonpartisan blanket primary with 444,517 votes (39.9%), followed by Vitter, who finished second with 256,300 votes (23%). In third place was Louisiana Public Service Commissioner Scott Angelle of Breaux Bridge, who received 214,982 votes (19.3%).

A JMC Analytics poll before the primary showed Edwards with a nine-point lead over Vitter, 28% to 19%. After the primary polls showed Edwards with a commanding lead. Market Research Insight pollster Verne Kennedy placed Edwards ahead, 54% to 38% or 51% to 40%, depending on the level of turnout among African-American voters, 25% or 20%.

Edwards won the November 21 runoff with 56.1% of the vote. The New York Times noted that the gubernatorial race was one "that many other Democrats once considered hopeless" early in the cycle.

==== 2019 ====
In 2019, Edwards ran for reelection to a second term as governor. In the runoff election, he faced Republican businessman Eddie Rispone. As Louisiana voted overwhelmingly for Donald Trump in the 2016 election, the race drew national attention after Trump visited the state multiple times on Rispone's behalf.

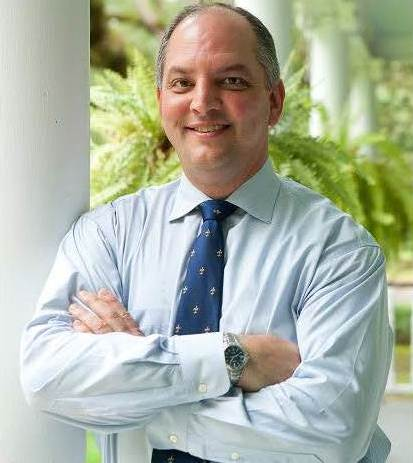
Portrait of Edwards in 2013

Edwards ultimately defeated Rispone, 51.33% to 48.67%. His victory made him the first Democratic governor of Louisiana to be elected to a second consecutive term since Edwin Edwards (no relation) was re-elected in 1975.

=== Tenure ===
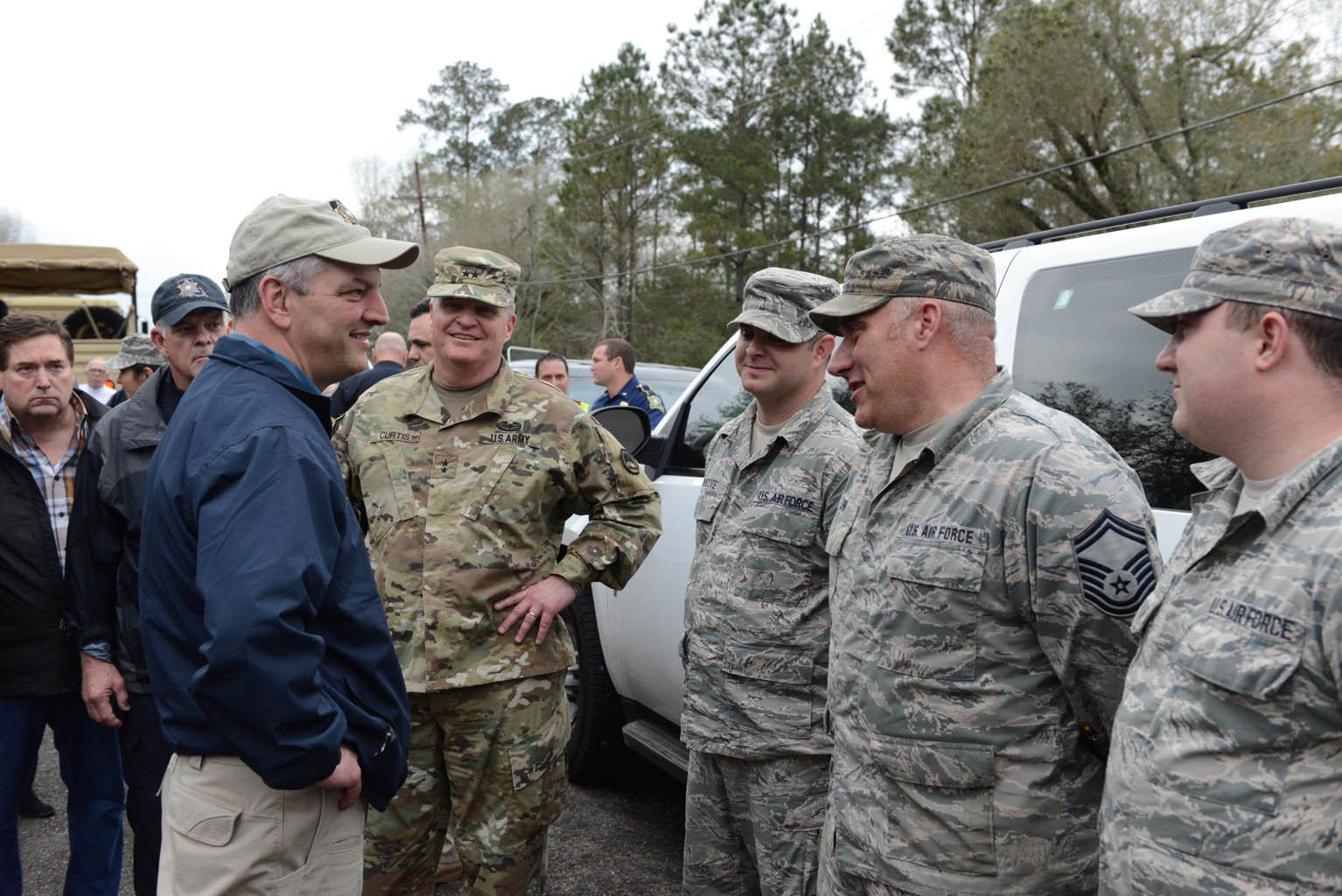
Edwards meeting with Louisiana National Guardsmen in Ponchatoula, Louisiana, March 2016

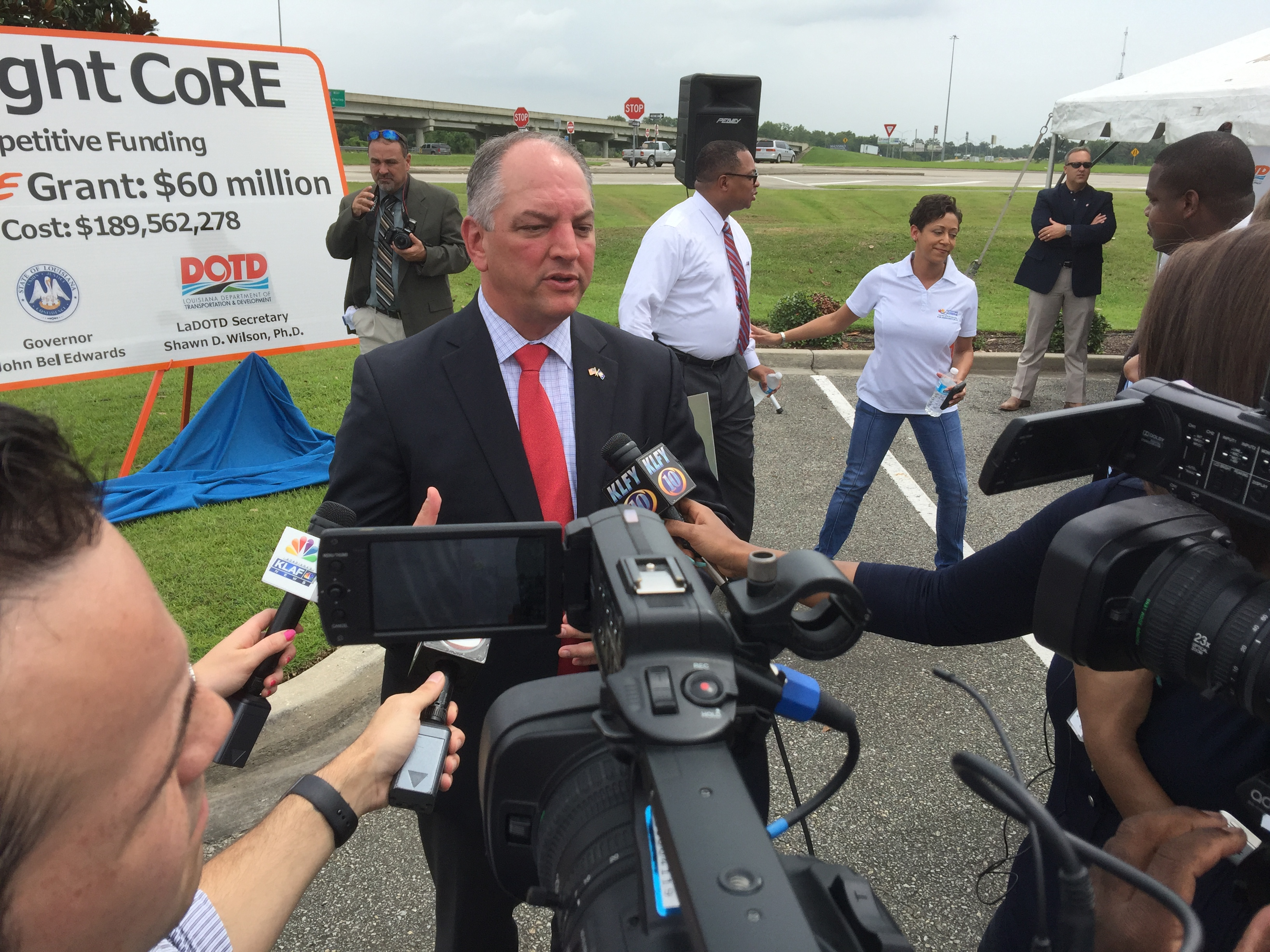
Edwards speaking at a press conference in Lafayette, Louisiana, August 2016

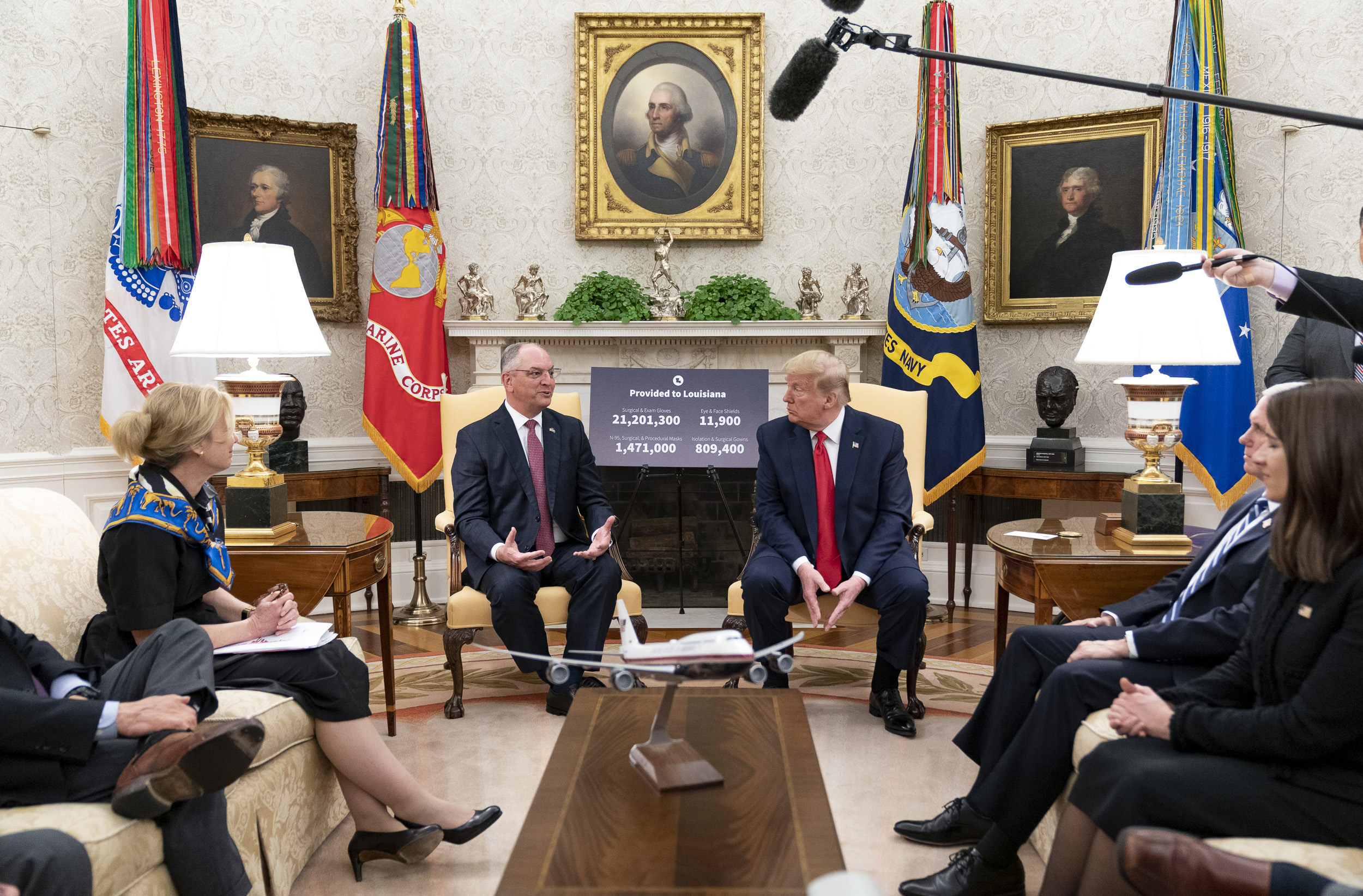
Edwards meeting with President Donald Trump in April 2020

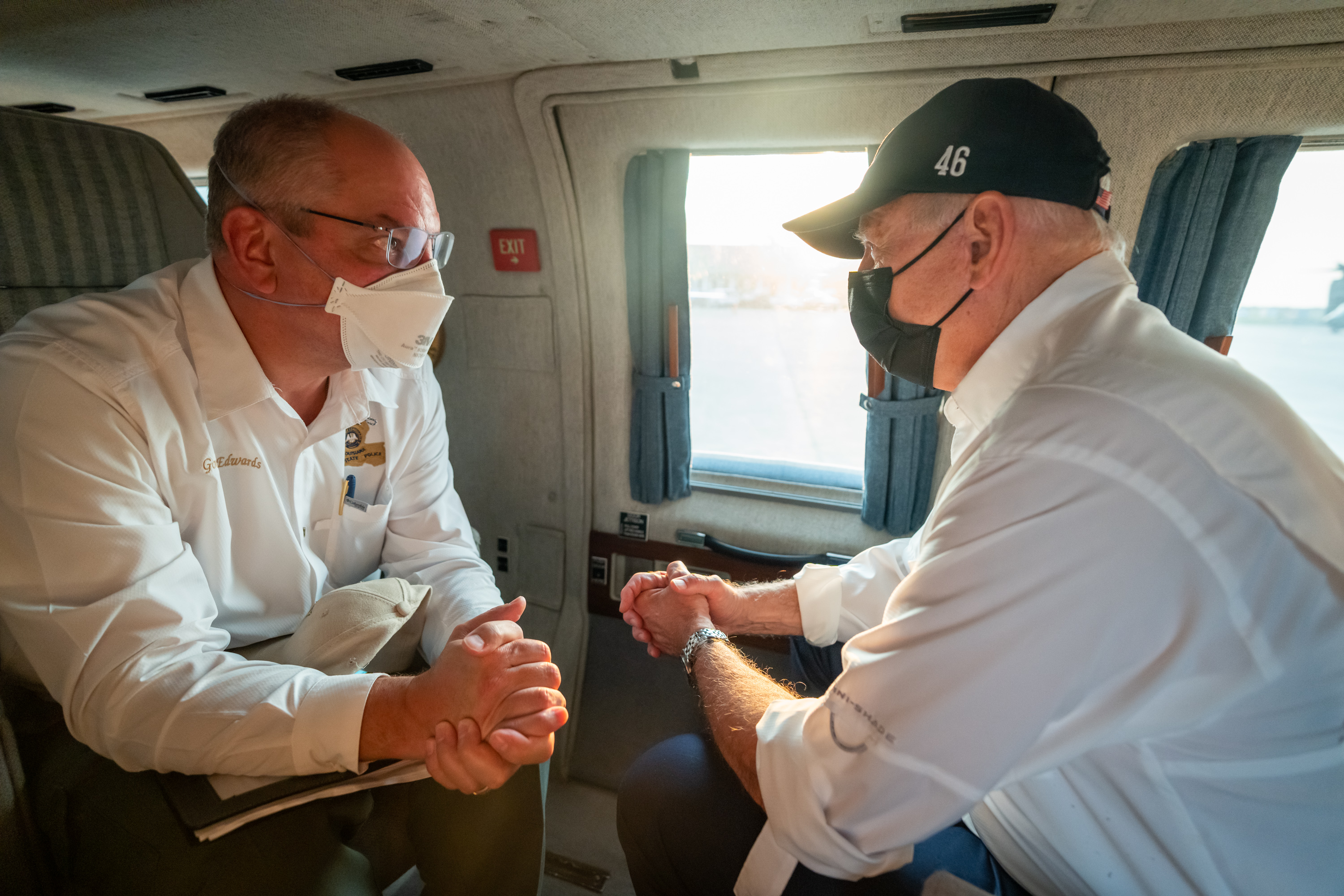
Edwards meeting with President Joe Biden in September 2021

Some political observers have described Edwards as a conservative Democrat. Edwards has also been described as a moderate and as a populist. In December 2018, Matt Malone, S.J., of America stated that Edwards held "progressive views on economics", a "commitment to a strong social safety net", and "moderate views on some social issues", adding that he is "anti-abortion, pro-Second Amendment, [and] pro-L.G.B.T. civil rights..."

On his inauguration day, Edwards failed to persuade the majority-Republican Louisiana House to choose a Democrat, Walt Leger III of New Orleans, as Speaker. On the second ballot, after Republican Cameron Henry, an ally of Vitter, withdrew from consideration, a second Republican, Taylor Barras of New Iberia, was named Speaker. Since Huey Long, governors had traditionally handpicked the state house speakers. Barras's selection was considered a surprise because he had not been mentioned as a candidate until the voting started.

On April 13, 2016, Edwards signed an executive order to protect lesbian, gay, bisexual, and transgender people from harassment or job dismissals. The order prohibits state agencies from discrimination based on either gender identity or sexual orientation. The order allows an exception for religious organizations that claim that compliance would violate their religious beliefs. "We respect our fellow citizens for their beliefs, but we do not discriminate based on our disagreements. I believe in giving every Louisianan the opportunity to be successful and to thrive in our state", Edwards said.

Edwards also rescinded another executive order issued in 2015 by his predecessor, Bobby Jindal, which protected businesses and nonprofit organizations that oppose same-sex marriage from being legally punished for acting on those views. This order had prohibited state agencies from penalizing businesses and individuals who refuse or limit service because of a "religious belief that marriage is or should be recognized as the union of one man and one woman."

In 2016, Edwards enacted Medicaid expansion. By the next year, the number of Louisianans without health insurance was cut in half (11.4%, down from 22.7%). According to a study conducted by LSU's E.J. Ourso College of Business, Edwards's Medicaid expansion made over 500,000 more adults eligible for Medicaid, of whom 327,000 were uninsured.

Edwards promised early in 2017 that he could work with the incoming Donald Trump administration. He expressed eagerness to work with the Trump Cabinet, particularly on Medicaid expansion and federal infrastructure projects.

In January 2017, Edwards traveled to Italy on a personal trip to discuss ways to combat human trafficking. He traveled with members of the Hospitaller Sisters of Mercy, who established a shelter in Baton Rouge for child victims of human trafficking. Edwards met with Pope Francis during the trip.

Edwards campaigned on a policy to reduce Louisiana's prison population. One of his first actions as governor was to commute 22 sentences out of 56 that the state's Board of Pardons had identified for him. Since the end of 2016 and to July 2018, Edwards did not sign a single commutation despite at least 70 cases that the state's Board of Pardons identified for him during the period. In 2018, Edwards signed legislation that shortened the sentences for nonviolent, non-sex-crime offenders who showed good behavior while in prison.

In May 2018, Edwards signed a bill into law banning abortion after 15 weeks of pregnancy. In May 2019, he signed an even more restrictive six-week abortion ban, although a similar bill in the 5th Circuit, one with a similar predecessor, was blocked by Judge Carlton Reeves in the Southern District of Mississippi. In response to backlash from his more progressive supporters, Edwards released a statement saying, "As governor, I have been true to my word and my beliefs on this issue. But it is also my sincere belief that being pro-life means more than just being pro-birth." He referenced his attempts to expand investment in education, reform Louisiana's criminal justice system, pass laws to protect LGBT citizens from discrimination in the workplace, raise the minimum wage, and ensure equal pay for men and women.

On May 22, 2018, Edwards signed an executive order requiring state vendors to certify that they are not boycotting Israel and will not for the duration of the contract boycott Israel. In 2019, the bill HB 245 was enacted, codifying the executive order. The Copy, Paste, Legislate investigation found that Edwards did not write the executive order nor the press release accompanying it. Instead, they were sent to him by a person with ties to AIPAC and the Israel Action Network.

In late 2018, Edwards said that his top priority for 2019 was to achieve a $1,000 pay raise for teachers and a $500 raise for school support workers. For the first time in 10 years, the House passed a budget that included pay raises for teachers and support staff.

On September 8, 2021, Edwards delayed all upcoming Louisiana elections five weeks after excessive statewide infrastructure damage caused by Hurricane Ida. On September 12, 2021, less than two weeks after Ida crested, Edwards declared another statewide state of emergency in anticipation of Hurricane Nicholas. On January 5, 2022, Edwards pardoned Homer Plessy, subject of the 1896 U.S. Supreme Court case Plessy v. Ferguson, which upheld segregation laws.

In 2023, Edwards signed HB8, which requires public schools to display the national motto "In God We Trust" in classrooms.

As of 2023, Edwards is the most recent Democrat to win or hold statewide office in Louisiana.

=== Cabinet and administration ===
The Edwards Cabinet
OFFICE	NAME	TERM
Governor	John Bel Edwards	2016–2024
Chief of Staff	Ben Nevers Mark Cooper	2016-2017 2017–2024
Commissioner of Administration	Jay Dardenne	2016–2024
Executive Assistant to the Governor for Coastal Activities, Coastal Protection and Restoration Authority Board Chairman	Chip Kline	2019–present
Secretary of Economic Development	Don Pierson	2016–2024
Secretary of Environmental Quality	Dr. Chuck Brown	2016–2024
Director of the Governor's Office of Homeland Security and Emergency Preparedness	Jim Waskom	2016–2024
Secretary of Health	Dr. Rebekah Gee	2016–2020
	Courtney N. Phillips	2020–2024
Executive Director of the Louisiana Workforce Commission	Ava Dejoie	2016–2024
Secretary of Public Safety and Corrections	Jimmy LeBlanc	2008–present
Secretary of Revenue	Kimberly Lewis Robinson	2016–2024
Secretary of Transportation and Development	Shawn Wilson	2016–2023
Superintendent of the Louisiana State Police	Colonel Michael "Mike" Edmonson	2008–2017
	Colonel Kevin W. Reeves	2017–2024
Secretary of Veterans Affairs	Joey Strickland	2016–2024
Secretary of Wildlife and Fisheries	Charlie Melançon	2016–2017
	Jack Montoucet	2017–2024
Secretary of Natural Resources	Thomas Harris	2016–2024
Secretary of Children and Family Services	Marketa Garner Walters	2016–2024

== Personal life ==
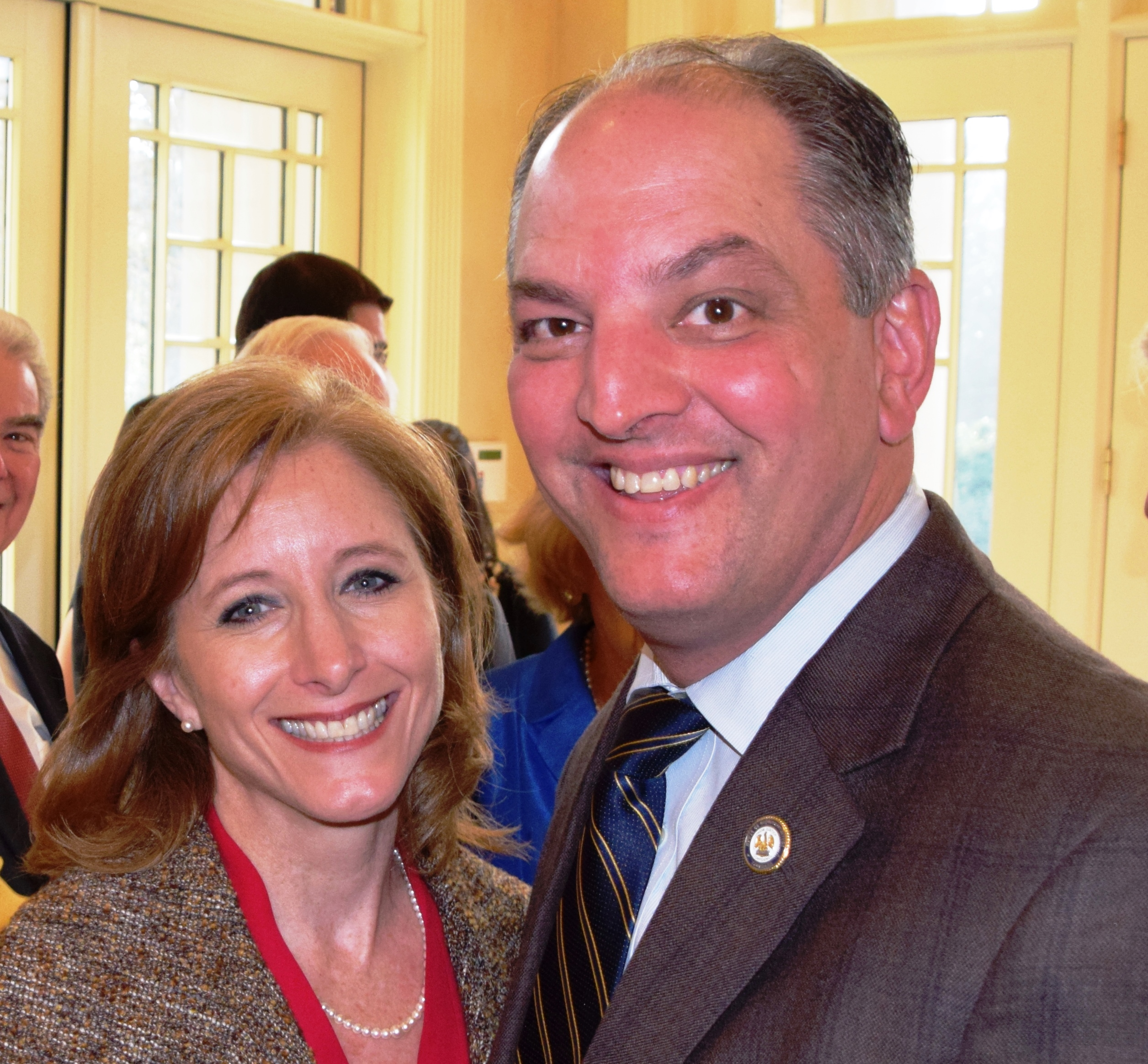
Edwards and his wife, Donna Hutto Edwards, at a fundraising event in 2015

Edwards is married to Donna Hutto. She graduated from the University of Southern Mississippi in Hattiesburg with a business degree in industrial management before training as a teacher. They have two daughters, Sarah and Samantha Edwards, and a son, John Miller Edwards.

Edwards is a Catholic and a parishioner of the St. Helena Roman Catholic Church in Amite City, Louisiana.

Edwards is the brother of Independence, Louisiana chief of police Frank Millard Edwards, as well as former Tangipahoa Parish Sheriff Daniel H. Edwards. Edwards is brother-in-law to 21st Judicial District Court Juvenile Judge Blair Downing Edwards, a Republican. In 2011, one of Edwards's brothers, Christopher Edwards, died in a car crash after his vehicle veered into oncoming traffic and collided with a UPS truck.

== Publications ==
=== Articles ===
- How Democrats can win, everywhere, Washington Post, November 25, 2019 (co-authored with Andy Beshear)

== Electoral history ==
=== Louisiana House of Representatives ===
2007

Blanket primary
Party	Candidate	Votes	%
Democratic	John Bel Edwards	6,142	44%
Democratic	George Tucker	2,499	18%
Democratic	Michael "Mike" Jackson	2,311	16%
Democratic	Walter Daniels	1,979	14%
Democratic	Ivory Dyson	1,088	8%
Total		14,019	100%
Runoff
Party	Candidate	Votes	%
Democratic	John Bel Edwards	6,825	66%
Democratic	George Tucker	3,541	34%
Total		10,366	100%
Democratic hold			

2011

2011 Louisiana House of Representatives 72nd district
Party	Candidate	Votes	%
Democratic	John Bel Edwards (inc.)	9,968	83%
No party	Johnny "I Can" Duncan	2,032	17%
Total		12,000	100%
Democratic hold			

=== Governor of Louisiana ===
2015

Blanket primary
Party	Candidate	Votes	%
Democratic	John Bel Edwards	444,517	39.89%
Republican	David Vitter	256,300	23.00%
Republican	Scott Angelle	214,982	19.29%
Republican	Jay Dardenne	166,656	14.96%
Democratic	Cary Deaton	11,763	1.06%
Democratic	S. L. Simpson	7,420	0.67%
No party	Beryl Billiot	5,694	0.51%
Other	Jeremy Odom	4,756	0.43%
Other	Eric Paul Orgeron	2,248	0.20%
Total		1,114,336	100%
Runoff
Party	Candidate	Votes	%
Democratic	John Bel Edwards	646,924	56.1%
Republican	David Vitter	505,940	43.9%
Total		1,152,864	100%
Democratic gain from Republican			

2019

Blanket primary
Party	Candidate	Votes	%
Democratic	John Bel Edwards (incumbent)	625,970	46.59%
Republican	Eddie Rispone	368,319	27.42%
Republican	Ralph Abraham	317,149	23.61%
Democratic	Oscar Dantzler	10,993	0.82%
Republican	Patrick Landry	10,966	0.82%
Other	Gary Landrieu	10,084	0.75%
Total		1,343,481	100%
Runoff
Party	Candidate	Votes	%
Democratic	John Bel Edwards (incumbent)	774,469	51.3%
Republican	Eddie Rispone	734,128	48.7%
Total		1,508,597	100%
Democratic hold			

Louisiana House of Representatives
Preceded by Jane Smith	Minority Leader of the Louisiana House of Representatives; 2012–2015	Succeeded by Gene Reynolds
Party political offices
Preceded by Tara Hollis	Democratic nominee for Governor of Louisiana; 2015, 2019	Succeeded by Shawn Wilson
Political offices
Preceded by Bobby Jindal	Governor of Louisiana; 2016–2024	Succeeded by Jeff Landry
U.S. order of precedence (ceremonial)
Preceded by Bobby Jindal as Former Governor	Order of precedence of the United States; Within Louisiana	Succeeded by Jack Markell as Former Governor
Preceded by Bobby Jindal as Former Governor	Order of precedence of the United States; Outside Louisiana	Succeeded by Mitch Daniels as Former Governor
