= WOTB =

- Pearl River, Louisiana; United States
- Broadcast area: New Orleans metropolitan area; Slidell, Louisiana; Bogalusa, Louisiana; Picayune, Mississippi
- Frequency: 88.7 MHz
- Branding: The Bridge Radio

Programming
- Format: Contemporary Christian music

Ownership
- Owner: New Horizon Christian Fellowship

Technical information
- Licensing authority: FCC
- Facility ID: 175764
- Class: C1
- ERP: 100,000 watts
- HAAT: 82.3 meters (270 ft)
- Transmitter coordinates: 30°32′09″N 89°51′52″W

Links
- Public license information: Public file; LMS
- Website: thebridge.fm

WOTB (88.7 FM) is a radio station licensed to Pearl River, Louisiana, United States. The station broadcasts a Contemporary Christian music format and is owned by New Horizon Christian Fellowship. WOTB serves the Greater New Orleans area, the Northshore and the Mississippi Gulf Coast.
