= Mary DuBuisson =

American politician

Member of the Louisiana House of Representatives from the 90th district
- In office December 19, 2018 – January 8, 2024
- Preceded by: Greg Cromer
- Succeeded by: Brian Glorioso

Personal details
- Party: Republican

Mary DuBuisson is an American politician who served as a member of the Louisiana House of Representatives from the 90th district. She represented parts of St. Tammany Parish from December 19, 2018, to January 8, 2024.

== Career ==
DuBuisson served as a legislative assistant in the office of State Representative Greg Cromer. She was elected to the Louisiana House of Representatives in December 2018, succeeding Cromer. On November 18, 2024, DuBuisson was defeated in a runoff election with Brian Glorioso.

In 2019, DuBuisson voted for a near-total abortion ban in Louisiana. In 2022, she pushed for exceptions in cases of rape and incest in a new abortion ban bill, but her Republican colleagues refused to include those exceptions, leading DuBuisson to vote against the bill. In 2023, DuBuisson sought to allow abortions in cases where pregnancies were not viable, arguing "To force a woman to carry to term with zero chance of survival is heartless and cruel." However, her Republican colleagues in the legislature did not vote in favor of the bill. She lost in the Republican primary in the 2024 elections, as pro-life groups opposed her and Louisiana Governor Jeff Landry endorsed her opponent.

== Personal life ==
DuBuisson lives in Slidell, Louisiana.
