= Bob Owen =

American politician

Member of the Louisiana Senate from the 1st district
- Incumbent
- Assumed office January 8, 2024
- Preceded by: Sharon Hewitt

Member of the Louisiana House of Representatives from the 76th district
- In office January 13, 2020 – January 8, 2024
- Preceded by: J. Kevin Pearson
- Succeeded by: Stephanie Berault

Personal details
- Party: Republican
- Education: Louisiana State University (BA)

Robert "Bob" Owen is a politician serving as a member of the Louisiana Senate from the 1st district, which covers parts of St. Tammany, Orleans, Plaquemines, and St. Bernard Parishes. He previously served in the Louisiana House of Representatives, representing the 76th district from 2020 to 2024. He won the October 14, 2023 election for District 1 of the Louisiana State Senate.

Owen was a lobbyist at the Louisiana State Legislature before being elected in 2019. He is currently the Executive director of Attention Deficit Disorders Clinics of Mississippi and The Center for Health Management. Owen is a supporter of term limits.
