= 1975 Louisiana gubernatorial election =

- November 1, 1975
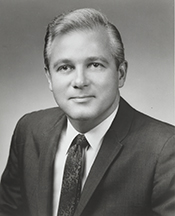

Candidate	Edwin Edwards	Robert G. Jones	Wade O. Martin Jr.
Party	Democratic	Democratic	Democratic
Popular vote	750,107	292,220	146,368
Percentage	62.35%	24.29%	12.17%
- Parish results Edwards: 30–40% 40–50% 50–60% 60–70% 70–80% 80–90% Jones: 30–40% 40–50%
Governor before election
Edwin Edwards
Democratic
Elected Governor
Edwin Edwards
Democratic

The 1975 Louisiana gubernatorial election resulted in the re-election of Edwin Edwards to his second term as governor of Louisiana. Edwards characterized his victory as a “solid expression of support by the people of Louisiana for some expansive reform.”

Edwards's re-election in 1975 to a second consecutive term marked the last time that a Democrat achieved that milestone until 2019, 44 years later, when John Bel Edwards (no relation) won re-election.

Louisiana adopted the Louisiana primary system in 1978, making 1975 the last time the state elected a governor under its prior system.

== Background ==
Elections in Louisiana—with the exception of U.S. presidential elections—follow a variation of the open primary system. Candidates of any and all parties are listed on one ballot; voters need not limit themselves to the candidates of one party. Unless one candidate takes more than 50% of the vote in the first round, a run-off election is then held between the top two candidates, who may in fact be members of the same party. In this election – the first gubernatorial election held under the state's new open primary law – the first round of voting was held on November 1, 1975.

Although no runoff was needed, because of the way the new election law was written, an unopposed runoff was held on December 13. Edwards received 430,095 votes in it, according to figures recorded by the Louisiana Secretary of State's office. The Republicans did not field a candidate for the election. The law was later rewritten so that the unopposed runoff was not required if a candidate won an outright majority in the primary. This happened in the 1983 election, when Edwards won a third non-consecutive term over Republican incumbent David C. Treen.

== Candidates ==
- Edwin Edwards, incumbent Governor of Louisiana since 1972
- Bob Jones, State Senator from Lake Charles and son of former Governor Sam H. Jones
- Ken Lewis, perennial candidate
- Wade O. Martin Jr., Louisiana Secretary of State since 1946
- Cecilia M. Pizzo
- Addison Roswell Thompson, perennial candidate

== Results ==
1975 Louisiana gubernatorial election
Party	Candidate	Votes	%
Democratic	Edwin Edwards (incumbent)	750,107	62.35%
Democratic	Bob Jones	292,220	24.29%
Democratic	Wade O. Martin Jr.	146,368	12.17%
Democratic	Ken Lewis	5,307	0.44%
Democratic	Addison Roswell Thompson	4,664	0.39%
Democratic	Cecilia M. Pizzo	4,338	0.36%
Total votes		1,203,004	100%

== Sources ==
- State of Louisiana. Primary and General Election Returns, 1975.
