= Eddie Rispone =

American politician

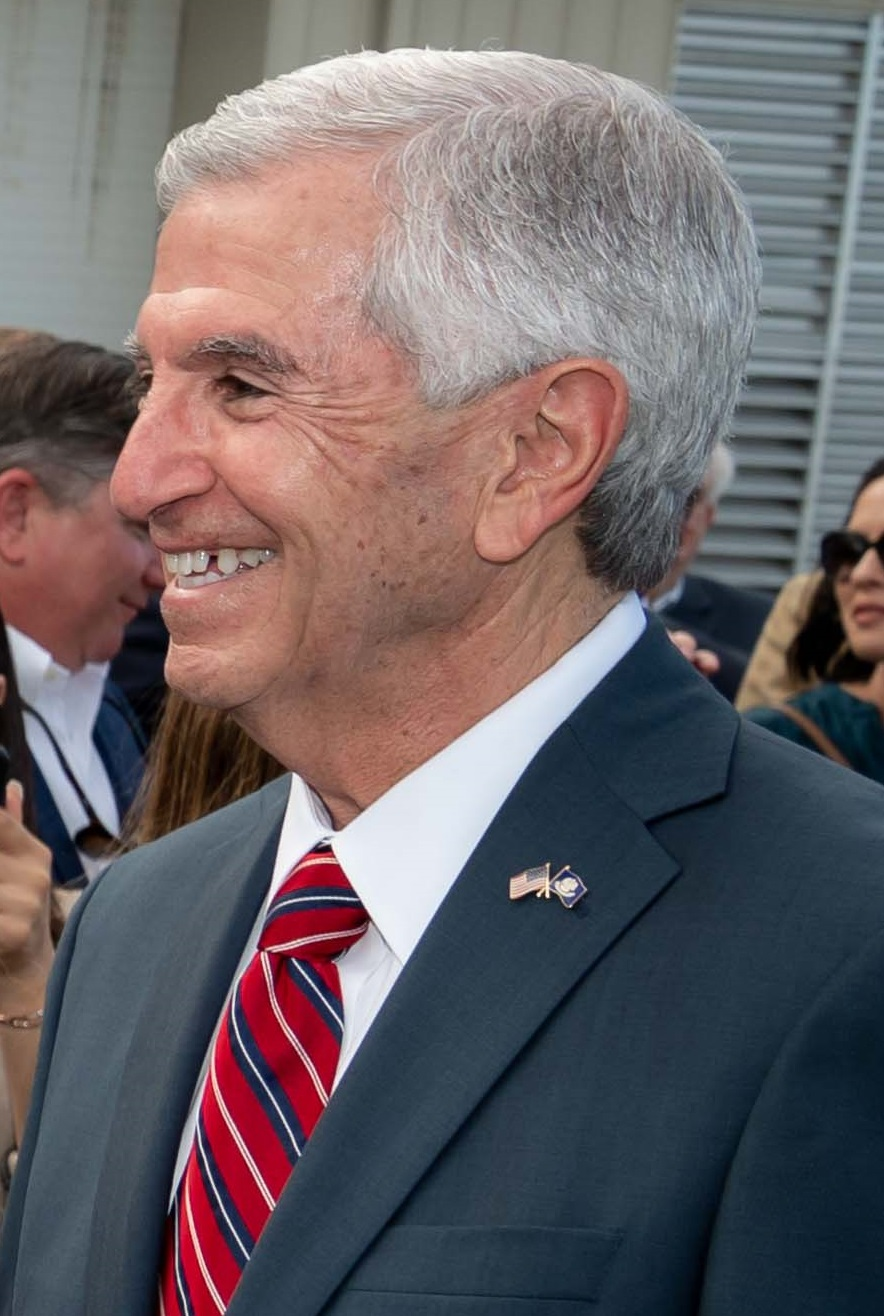
- Rispone in 2019
- Born: Edward Lee Rispone; January 21, 1949 (age 77); Baton Rouge, Louisiana, U.S.
- Education: Louisiana State University (BS)
- Occupation: Businessman
- Political party: Republican
- Spouses: Phyllis Rispone (m. 1970; died 2005) Linda Rispone (m. 2007)

Edward Lee Rispone (/rɪsˈpoʊni/ ris-POH-nee; born January 21, 1949) is an American businessman and political candidate from the state of Louisiana. He ran as a Republican Party candidate for Governor of Louisiana in the 2019 election, losing to incumbent Democrat John Bel Edwards.

== Early life and education ==
Rispone was raised in Baton Rouge, Louisiana. His father worked as a compressor machinist at an oil refinery owned by Standard Oil, and his mother was a homemaker. He has five brothers and one sister.

Rispone graduated from Redemptorist High School in Baton Rouge. In high school, he played football as a linebacker and offensive guard, and was named to the all-state team in his senior year. He graduated from Louisiana State University, with a concentration in construction technology, in 1972.

== Career ==
Rispone began working in construction while he was still in school. In 1989, he and his brother Jerry founded ISC Constructors; in 2017 he said that the company had annual revenues of $350 million. In 2000 he criticized a tax increase approved by a state house committee stating that "this has the potential to wipe out all of our profits" due to his business operating on a small profit. In 2003 he was elected the national chairman of the Associated Builders and Contractors. The Louisiana Federation for Children, which advocates for school vouchers, named Rispone as its chairman in 2011. Governor Bobby Jindal appointed him to chair the Louisiana Workforce Investment Council.

In October 2018, Rispone declared his candidacy in the 2019 Louisiana gubernatorial election as a Republican. On October 12, 2019, Rispone finished in second place in the all-candidate election with 27% of the vote, behind incumbent John Bel Edwards, a Democrat, who received 47%, and ahead of Republican congressman Ralph Abraham, who received 24%. Rispone and Edwards advanced to the November 16 runoff election. Edwards defeated Rispone in the runoff election.

== Personal life ==
Rispone and his first wife, Phyllis, were married for 35 years. She died in 2005 of cancer. Rispone married his second wife, Linda, in 2007. He and Linda have seven children and 24 grandchildren as of September 2019.

== Electoral history ==
2019 Louisiana gubernatorial election
Party	Candidate	Votes	%
Democratic	John Bel Edwards (incumbent)	625,970	46.6
Republican	Eddie Rispone	368,319	27.4
Republican	Ralph Abraham	317,149	23.6
Democratic	Oscar Dantzler	10,993	0.8
Republican	Patrick Landry	10,966	0.8
Independent	Gary Landrieu	10,084	0.7
Total votes		1,343,481	100.0

2019 Louisiana gubernatorial election runoff
Party	Candidate	Votes	%	±%
Democratic	John Bel Edwards (incumbent)	774,469	51.34%	−4.77%
Republican	Eddie Rispone	734,128	48.66%	+4.77%
Total votes		1,508,597	100.00%	N/A

Party political offices
Preceded by David Vitter	Republican nominee for Governor of Louisiana; 2019	Succeeded by Jeff Landry
