= Greg Cromer =

American politician

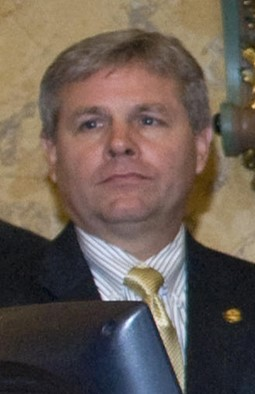
- Comer in 2010

Mayor of Slidell, Louisiana
- Incumbent
- Assumed office 2018

Member of the Louisiana House of Representatives from the 90th district
- In office January 2008 – June 29, 2018
- Preceded by: Matthew Peter Schneider III
- Succeeded by: Mary DuBuisson

Personal details
- Born: George Gregory Cromer; June 26, 1958 (age 68)
- Party: Republican
- Spouse: Peggy Sue Cromer
- Children: 2
- Education: Southeastern Louisiana University (BS)

George Gregory Cromer (born June 26, 1958), is an American politician, currently serving as the mayor of Slidell, Louisiana. A Republican, he previously served as a member of the Louisiana House of Representatives from 2008 to 2018.

== Education ==
In 1981, Cromer graduated with a Bachelor of Science degree in industrial management technology from Southeastern Louisiana University in Hammond.

== Career ==
After graduating from college, Cromer was employed in New Orleans by Lockheed Martin at the Michoud Assembly Facility of the National Aeronautics and Space Administration. Formerly, he was the District G city council member in Slidell, Louisiana. Cromer was elected to the House when the term-limited Matthew Peter Schneider ran unsuccessfully for the Louisiana State Senate.

Cromer was a member of the House committees on Civil Law and Procedure, Governmental Affairs, and Retirement. Pearson was also chairman of the Retirement Committee. During his tenure, Cromer addressed the issue of flooding in the Slidell area and the required steps to remedy high water.

Cromer and the St. Tammany legislative delegation worked to procure the widening of Interstate 12 from four to six lanes in the Slidell area, a $26 million project. In the dedication of the project, Governor Bobby Jindal said that the state had spent $122 million in transportation projects in St. Tammany Parish alone from 2008 to 2011 and $3.6 billion statewide on roads and ports during the same time period. The state also spent $220 million in the I-12 corridor from East Baton Rouge Parish to St. Tammany Parish.

Cromer was reelected in the primary election held on October 22, 2011. He received 5,030 votes (74.9 percent) to 1,683 ballots (25.1 percent) for his intra-party rival, J. "Ron" Eldridge.

On April 22, 2012, Cromer resigned his membership in the American Legislative Exchange Council (ALEC), of which he had been the Louisiana state chairman.

Louisiana House of Representatives
Preceded by Matthew Peter Schneider, III	Louisiana State Representative for District 90 (St. Tammany Parish); George Gregory "Greg" Cromer; 2008–2018	Succeeded by Mary DuBuisson
