= Stephanie Berault =

American politician

Member of the Louisiana House of Representatives from the 76th district
- Incumbent
- Assumed office January 8, 2024
- Preceded by: Bob Owen

Personal details
- Party: Republican
- Education: University of Southern Mississippi (BS)
- Occupation: Executive Director

Stephanie Hunter Berault is an American politician serving as a member of the Louisiana House of Representatives from the 76th district. A member of the Republican Party, Berault represents St. Tammany Parish and has been in office since January 8, 2024.
