= Paul Rainwater =

American politician

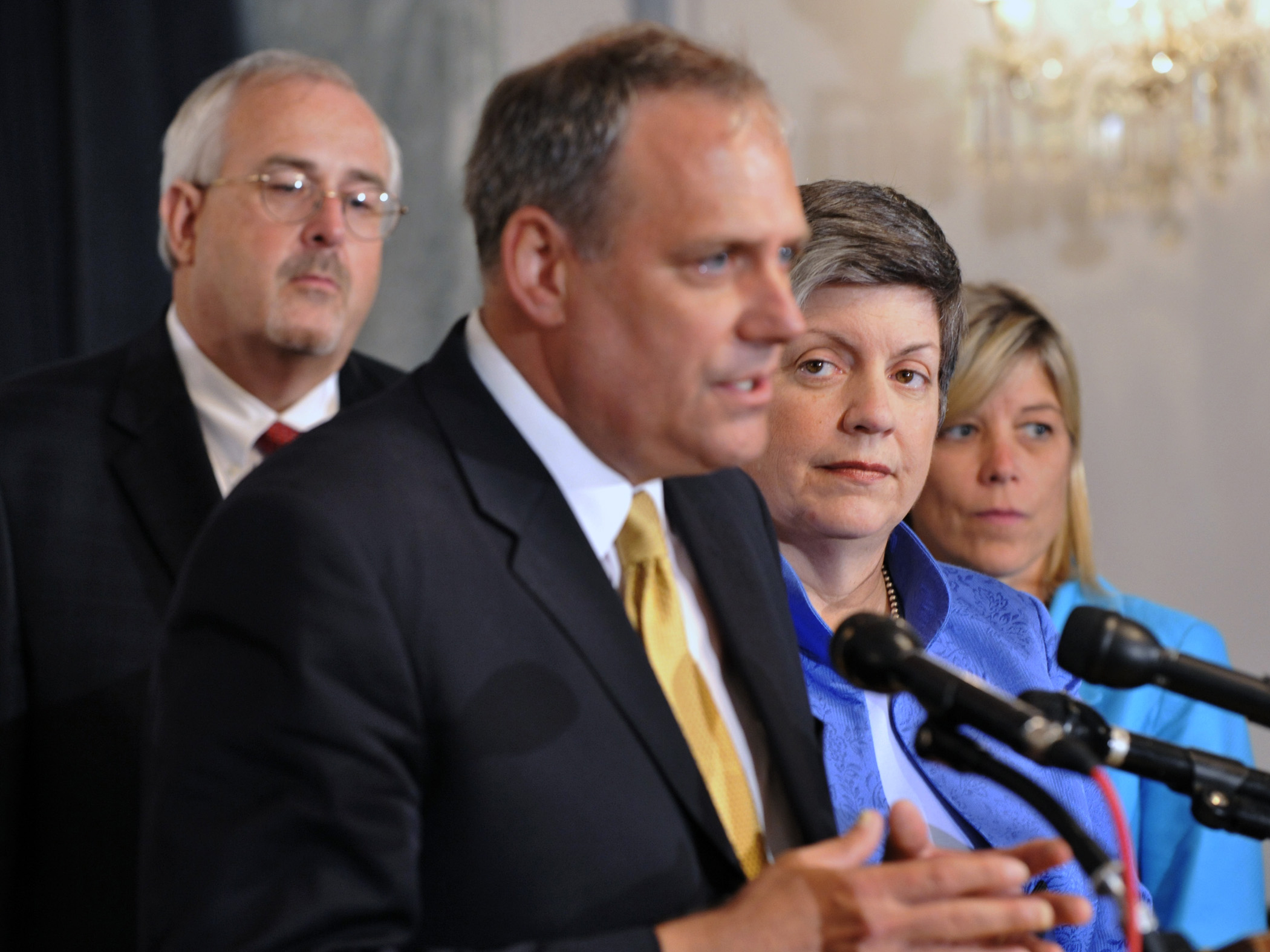

Chief of Staff to the Governor of Louisiana
- In office 2012–2014
- Governor: Bobby Jindal

Louisiana Commissioner of Administration
- In office 2010–2012

Personal details
- Education: McNeese State University (B.A.); Salve Regina University (M.A.)

Paul W. Rainwater is an American former local and state government official from Louisiana who served as an aide to Governor Bobby Jindal and played a prominent role in Louisiana during its recovery from Hurricanes Katrina, Rita, Gustav, and Ike and the recovery of the state from the 2010 British Petroleum Oil Spill.

== Career ==
Rainwater began his career as an Army officer in the United States Army Reserves and the Louisiana Army National Guard, retiring in 2015 as an Army Colonel. Rainwater earned a B.A. in government from McNeese State University in Lake Charles, Louisiana and an M.A. in international relations from Salve Regina University in Newport, Rhode Island.

From 2012 through 2014, Rainwater served as Chief of Staff to Louisiana Governor Bobby Jindal. Prior to serving as Chief of Staff, from 2010 through 2012, Rainwater served as Commissioner of Administration for the State of Louisiana, the chief operating officer and chief budget officer for the state. Prior to his service as Commissioner of Administration, Rainwater served as the executive director of the Louisiana Recovery Authority, the state agency charged with allocating federal recovery funds in the wake of Hurricanes Katrina and Rita. Additionally, Rainwater served for several years post-Katrina as chief of operations in the Washington, D.C. office for then-U.S. Senator Mary Landrieu, and from 2000 to 2006 as Chief Administrative Officer of Lake Charles, Louisiana.

In 2008, prior to Hurricane Gustav making landfall, Rainwater was dispatched by Governor Jindal to assist then-New Orleans Mayor Ray Nagin to assist in managing the response and evacuation of the city. During Hurricane Katrina in 2005, Rainwater helped manage Louisiana's response, including evacuations from the I-10 Causeway in Jefferson Parish. In the immediate aftermath of the second flooding of New Orleans during the summer of 2017, New Orleans Mayor Mitch Landrieu dismissed the leadership of the Sewerage and Water Board of New Orleans and named Rainwater as Interim Emergency Manager of the utility, charging him with overseeing the water and drainage systems of the city through the end of hurricane season while making emergency repairs to the system.

In his military role, Rainwater served in Operation Enduring Freedom as part of the Army's early entry module immediately following the September 11 attacks and as a finance officer, civil affairs plans officer, and as the deputy adjutant general for the theater of operations during Operation Iraqi Freedom. In his military role, Rainwater was awarded the Legion of Merit, the Bronze Star, the Meritorious Service Medal, the Joint Service Achievement Medal, the Army Commendation Medal, the Army Achievement Medal, and the Combat Action Badge.

Rainwater serves as a consultant for Cornerstone Government Affairs, is a principal with Rainwater Consulting, LLC., and is a partner with the disaster response/recovery firm Plexos Group.

In early 2017, it was speculated that Rainwater would be selected to serve as Director of the Federal Emergency Management Agency in the Donald Trump Administration. Brock Long, the former head of the Alabama Emergency Management Agency was ultimately selected. In late 2023, Louisiana Governor Jeff Landry appointed Rainwater to the governor's statewide transition team. In early 2024, Governor Landry appointed Rainwater the chair of a task force charged with reviewing and providing recommendations on how to improve the Sewerage and Water Board of New Orleans.

Rainwater lives in Baton Rouge, Louisiana.
