= St. Claude Avenue Bridge =

Bridge in New Orleans, Louisiana, United States

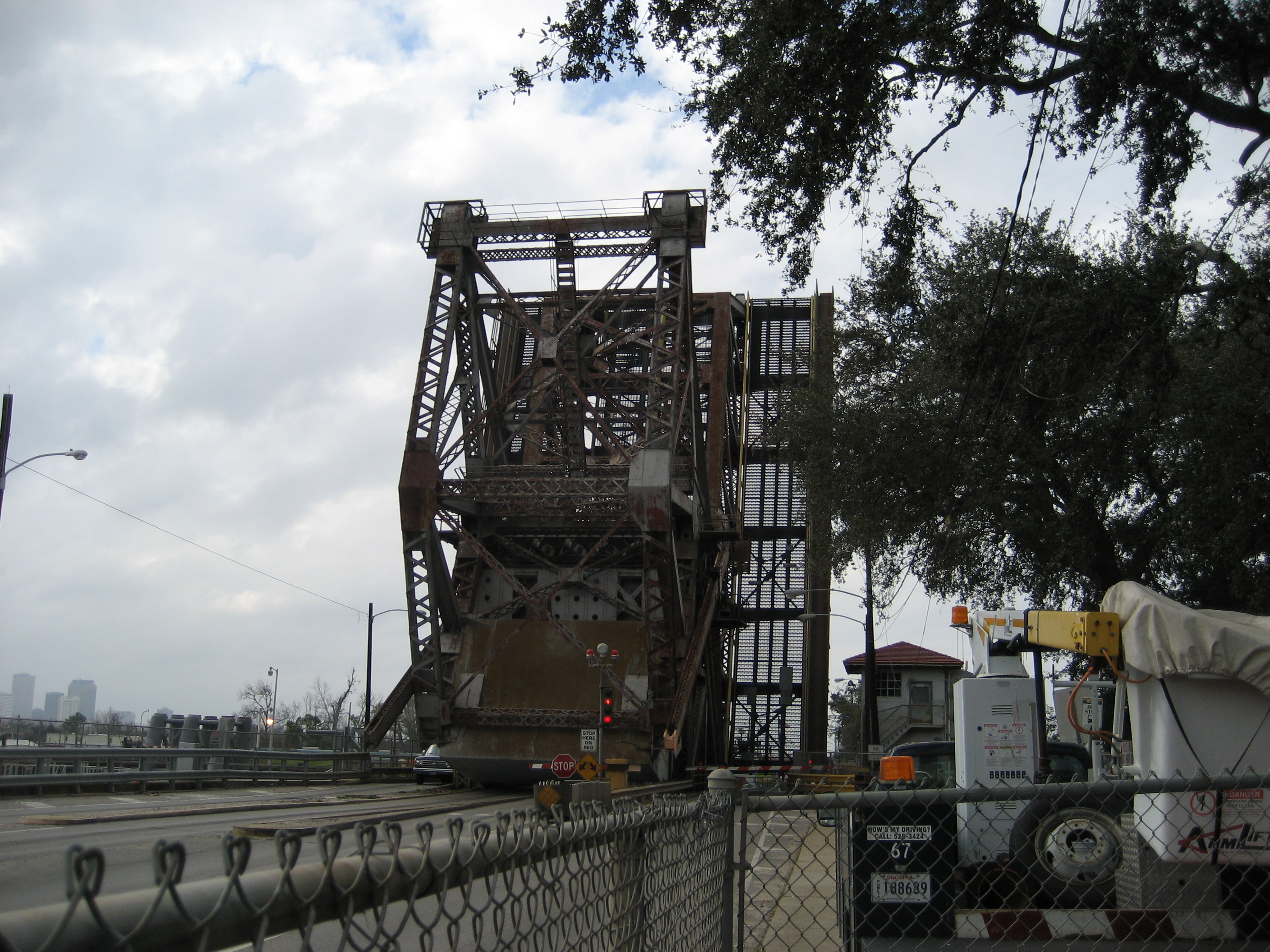
- Coordinates: 29°57′50″N 90°01′39″W
- Carries: St. Claude Avenue
- Crosses: Industrial Canal
- Locale: New Orleans, Louisiana

Characteristics
- Design: Bascule Truss
- Total length: 137 ft
- Width: 24 ft

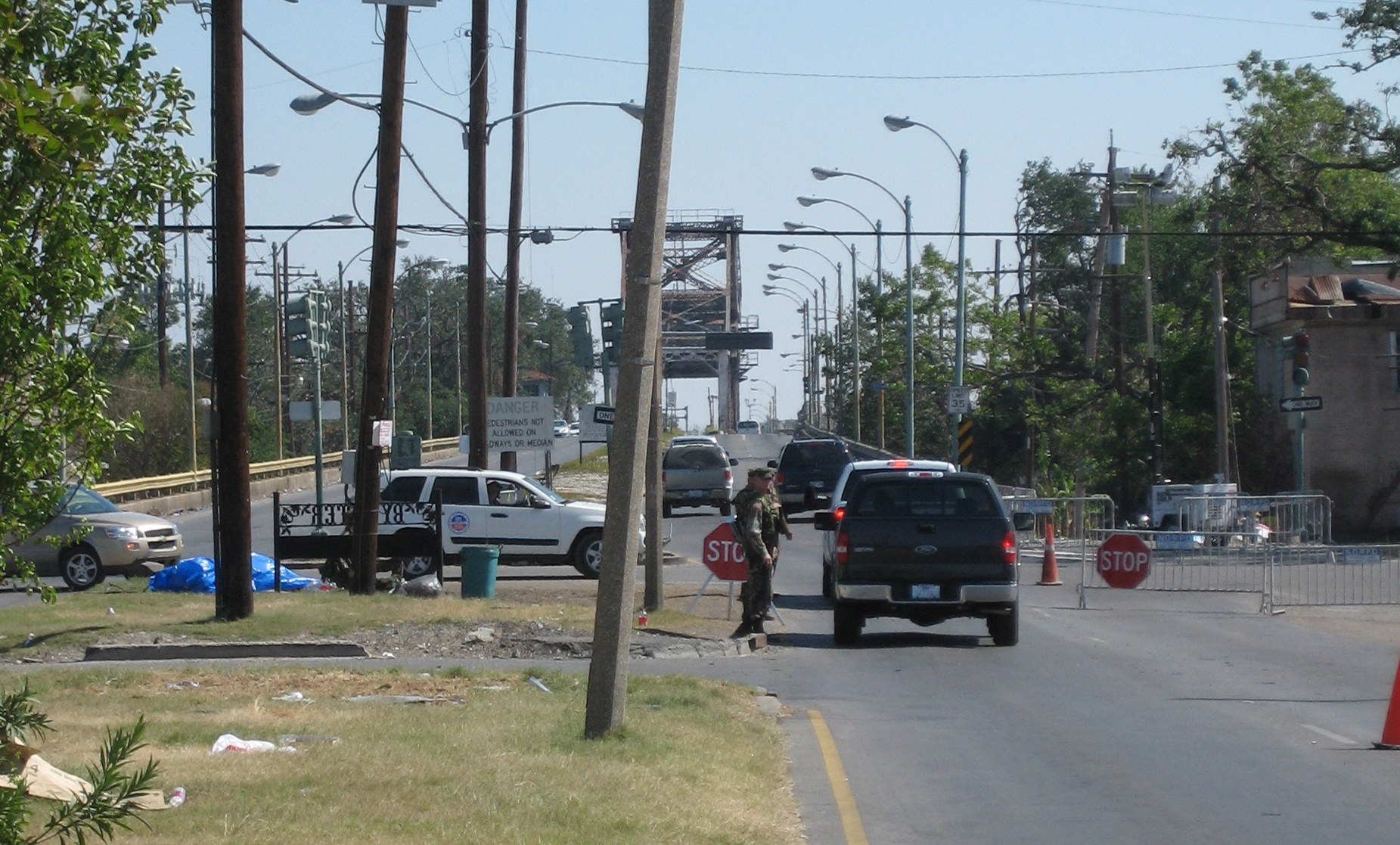
In October 2005, access over the bridge was restricted due to the devastation caused by levee breaches on the Lower Ninth Ward side during Hurricane Katrina.

The St. Claude Avenue Bridge is a bascule bridge with four vehicular lanes over the Industrial Canal in New Orleans, Louisiana. The bridge was designed by the Strauss Bascule Bridge Company of Chicago and built in 1919 by the Bethlehem Steel Bridge Corporation. It was originally a combination railroad and automobile bridge, with two pairs of railroad tracks in the center of the lift span and automobile lanes straddling it. The railroad is no longer there, its place on the bridge taken by additional vehicular lanes. One lane in each direction passes through the truss of the bridge and one lane passes alongside the truss. The bridge is integrated into the Industrial Canal Lock structure, on the river side of the lock chamber; it raises when marine traffic enters or exits the lock.

The Upper Ninth Ward, which includes neighborhoods such as the Bywater neighborhood, is on the upriver side of the bridge, and the Lower Ninth Ward on the downriver side.

In the aftermath of the levee failures during Hurricane Katrina in 2005, many people took refuge from the flooding atop the bridge, and people from the severely flooded Lower Ninth Ward used it to get to the dry, high ground near the river on the upriver side of the bridge. For some months after the storm the bridge was the only open direct route between the Lower Ninth Ward and the rest of New Orleans.
