= Brian Glorioso =

American politician

Member of the Louisiana House of Representatives from the 90th district
- Incumbent
- Assumed office January 8, 2024
- Preceded by: Mary DuBuisson

Personal details
- Born: April 20, 1974 (age 52)
- Party: Republican
- Education: University of New Orleans (BGS); Loyola Law School (JD)
- Occupation: Attorney

Brian Glorioso is an American politician serving as a member of the Louisiana House of Representatives from the 90th district. A member of the Republican Party, Glorioso represents parts of St. Tammany Parish and has been in office since January 8, 2024.
