= Sharon Hewitt =

American politician (born 1958)

Majority Leader of the Louisiana Senate
- In office January 13, 2020 – January 8, 2024
- Preceded by: Danny Martiny
- Succeeded by: Jeremy Stine

Member of the Louisiana Senate from the 1st district
- In office January 2016 – January 8, 2024
- Preceded by: A. G. Crowe
- Succeeded by: Bob Owen

Personal details
- Born: Sharon Woodall; September 1958 (age 67)
- Party: Republican
- Spouse: Stanley Hewitt
- Children: 2
- Education: Louisiana State University (BS)
- Website: State Senate website Campaign website

Sharon Woodall Hewitt (born September 1958) is a former Republican member of the Louisiana State Senate for the 1st district, which encompasses portions of St. Tammany, Orleans, Plaquemines, and St. Bernard Parishes. In January 2016, she succeeded fellow Republican A. G. Crowe, who did not pursue a third term in the primary election held on October 24, 2015. She chaired the Republican Legislative Delegation in the state senate.

Hewitt was a candidate in the 2023 Louisiana gubernatorial election.

== Background and personal life ==
Hewitt attended Louisiana State University in Baton Rouge, receiving her Bachelor of Science in mechanical engineering in 1981.

Hewitt and her husband, Stan, have two sons. They are members of Aldersgate United Methodist Church in Slidell.

== Career ==
After graduating from LSU, Hewitt started her career working in the field as a technical contributor, in which capacity she assisted in the installation of the first electrical submersible pump in the Gulf of Mexico.

After serving in seven positions at Shell Oil, Hewitt became Deepwater Assets Manager, responsible for all oil and gas activities in the Central Gulf of Mexico. Hewitt managed a team of over 160 engineers, geologists, geophysicists, offshore workers, and support staff. Managing a $250 million annual budget, Hewitt oversaw more than 10% of Shell Oil's domestic production.

Hewitt has noted the attitude of the oil and gas industry of that time towards women working in the field, and has led initiatives to encourage female STEM education and employment in the industry.

== Community service ==
Hewitt held seventeen positions, including Chapter President, over her 11 years of service for the National Parent-Teacher Association. In 2010, Hewitt received the National PTA Life Achievement Award (the organization's highest honor at the national level), for her advocacy and leadership in education, safety, and legislation. Hewitt has been recognized for her efforts to replace technology equipment in local schools after Hurricane Katrina devastated the area in 2005. Following Hurricane Ike in 2008, Hewitt organized a relief effort with the Military Road schools, which successfully delivered supplies within two weeks to schools impacted in nearby Cameron Parish.

Hewitt served as the Chairman for the St. Tammany Parish Recreation Board, District 16, from 2012–2015. In this role, Hewitt led the effort to develop a master plan for parks and recreation in eastern St. Tammany Parish, raising over $65,000 to fund the initiative.

Hewitt is an active volunteer with the East St. Tammany Habitat for Humanity, serving as a Coordinator for the organization's Fall & Spring Women's Build.

== Louisiana State Senate ==
On March 4, 2015, Sharon Hewitt announced her candidacy for the Louisiana State Senate, District 1. Hewitt ran a campaign based on her diverse leadership experience at Shell Oil, as well as her budgeting, finance, and management skills. After defeating her opponent Pete Schneider, Hewitt assumed office on January 11, 2016, for a four-year term.

=== Legislation ===
Hewitt has been recognized for her legislative activity, focusing on Louisiana's budgetary issues, STEM education, creating jobs, and restoring Louisiana's coast.

In the 2017 Regular Session of the Louisiana State Senate, Senator Hewitt authored or coauthored 18 pieces of legislation. Three bills authored or coauthored by Hewitt in the 2017 Regular Session have been sent to the governor. Hewitt authored SB225, which would create the Louisiana Science, Technology, Engineering, and Mathematics Advisory Council (LaSTEM). SB 225 passed both chambers of the Louisiana State Legislature with bipartisan support, and was sent the governor on June 8, 2017.

=== Committee assignments ===
- Environmental Quality Committee
- Finance Committee
- Transportation, Highways, and Public Works Committee
- Coastal Restoration and Flood Control Committee
- Women and Children Committee

== Gubernatorial election ==
In January 2023, Hewitt announced via social media that she was running for Governor of Louisiana for the 2023 election. She won 1.74% vote in the primary which was won by fellow Republican Jeff Landry.

== Electoral history ==
During her campaign announcement in 2015, Hewitt stated, "People are tired of career politicians. As an engineer, I am a problem solver. It's time to stop the political games and get to work. Throughout my life, I've earned leadership roles where my passion, organizational skill, collaboration with stakeholders and ability to inspire others has helped solve problems. I will use my skills and abilities to help the people of this district."

Hewitt received several prominent conservative endorsements throughout the campaign, including the St. Tammany Parish Republican Party, GatorPAC, and the political arm of the Louisiana Association of Business and Industry.

On October 24, 2015, Hewitt defeated her primary opponent, fellow Republican and former member of the Louisiana House of Representatives Pete Schneider of Lacombe. Hewitt received 15,144 votes (58.7 percent) to Schneider's 10,645 (41.3 percent). Hewitt and Schneider agreed in the campaign on the need to repair the state budget.

Prior to her 2015 Senate campaign, Hewitt ran for the District 1 seat on the Louisiana Board of Elementary and Secondary Education, which encompasses Jefferson, Orleans, and St. Tammany parishes. On October 22, 2011, Hewitt was defeated by fellow Republican James Garvey, who received 58.3% of the primary vote.

2015

Louisiana State Senate Elections, 2015
| Party | Candidate | Votes | % |
|---|---|---|---|
| Republican | Sharon Hewitt | 15,537 | 58.97% |
| Republican | Pete Schneider | 10,810 | 41.03% |
| Republican hold | | | |

2011

Louisiana Board of Elementary and Secondary Education Elections, 2011
| Party | Candidate | Votes | % |
|---|---|---|---|
| Republican | Jim Garvey | 57,910 | 58.35% |
| Republican | Sharon Hewitt | 29,483 | 29.71 |
| Independent | Lee Barrios | 11,856 | 11.95% |
| Republican hold | | | |

Louisiana State Senate
| Preceded by A. G. Crowe | Member of the Louisiana Senate from the 1st district 2016–2024 | Succeeded by Bob Owen |
| Preceded by Danny Martiny | Majority Leader of the Louisiana Senate; 2020–2024 | Succeeded by Jeremy Stine |
