= Pearl River, Louisiana =

- Town
- Town of Pearl River
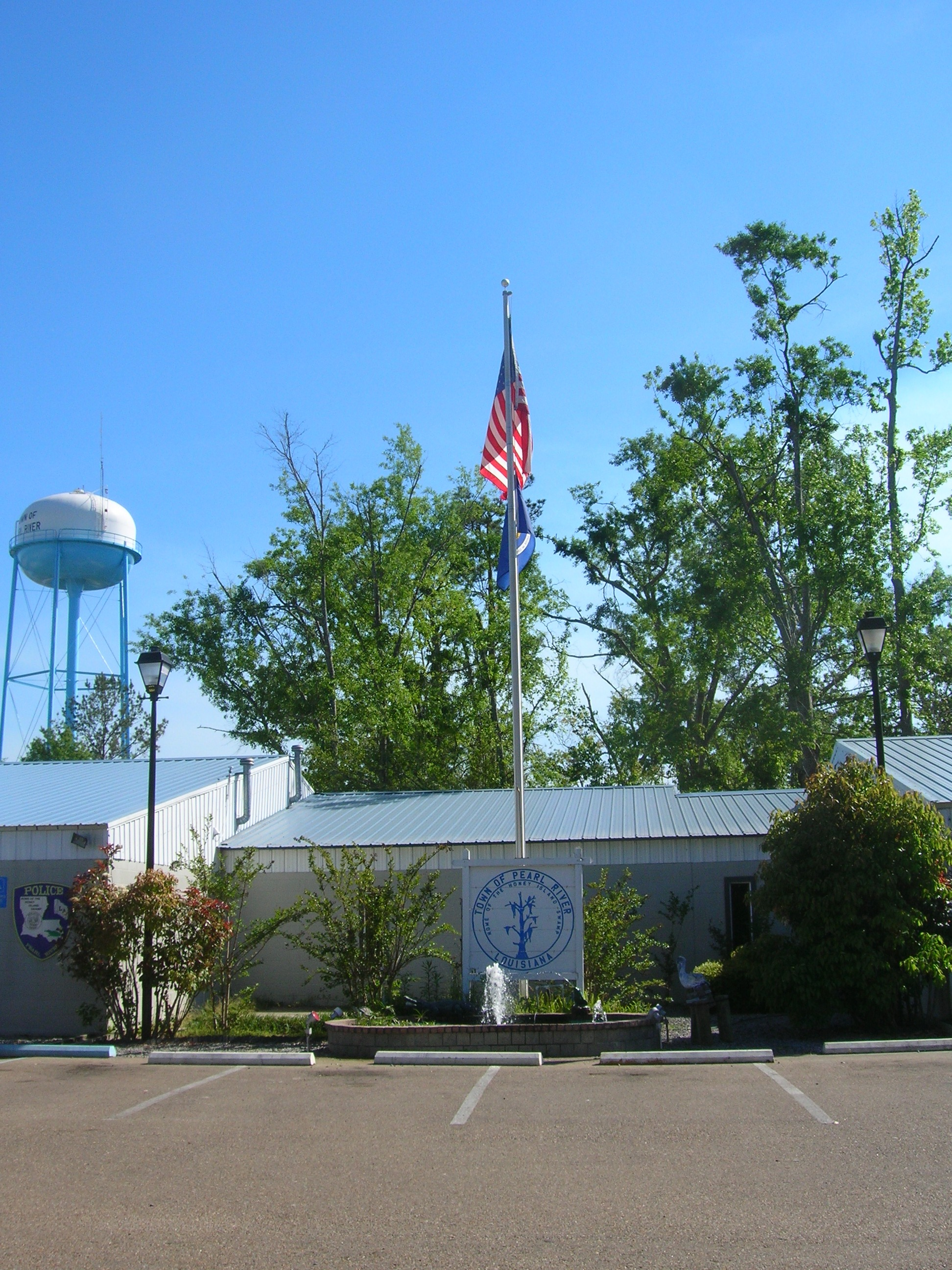
- Pearl River Municipal Complex
- Motto: Home of the Honey Island Swamp
- Location of Pearl River in St. Tammany Parish, Louisiana.

- Location of Louisiana in the United States
- Coordinates: 30°22′16″N 89°45′04″W
- Country: United States
- State: Louisiana
- Parish: St. Tammany
- Incorporation (Village): May 24, 1906
- Town: 1964

Government
  - Mayor: David McQueen (R) (Reelected 2018) (R)
  - Chief of Police: Jack Sessions (R) (Elected 2018)
  - Alderwoman: Bridgett Yates Bennett (2014–present) (R)
  - Alderwoman: Angel Galloway (I)
  - Alderman: Joe D. Lee (R)
  - Alderwoman: Kathryn "Kat" Walsh (R)

Area
  - Total: 3.81 sq mi (9.86 km^{2})
  - Land: 3.73 sq mi (9.67 km^{2})
  - Water: 0.073 sq mi (0.19 km^{2})
- Elevation: 26 ft (7.9 m)

Population (2020)
  - Total: 2,565
  - Density: 687/sq mi (265.2/km^{2})
- Time zone: UTC−06:00 (CST)
  - Summer (DST): UTC−05:00 (CDT)
- ZIP code: 70452
- Area code: 985
- FIPS code: 22-59445
- Website: pearlriverla.com

Pearl River is a town in St. Tammany Parish in the U.S. state of Louisiana. The population was 2,506 at the 2010 U.S. census, and 2,618 at the 2020 population estimates program. It is part of the New Orleans–Metairie–Kenner metropolitan statistical area.

== History ==
The community that is today Pearl River was originally known as Halloo, a moniker it reputedly garnered from loggers yelling to one another as they labored along the nearby Pearl River. The town was founded in 1859. Early Halloo was a small railroad town, located at the junction of the Northeastern and Poitevent and Favre's East Louisiana Railroads. In 1886 a train station was constructed at the site, and two years later Samuel Russ Poitevent (June 4, 1852– June 3, 1904), established the first store in the village. The community's name was first changed from Halloo (1859) to Pearl (1878), later to Pearlville (1881), and eventually Pearl River, in 1888, after the train station built in the town.

On July 13, 1898, the 200 citizens of Pearl River voted to petition the state of Louisiana for incorporation as the "Village of Pearl River", a request which was granted nearly a decade later, on May 24, 1906, by governor Newton Crain Blanchard, with G.W. Fuller as the first mayor. The village slowly modernized over the course of the next half century, acquiring the land for a courthouse in 1935 and a town hall ten years later. Pearl River Junior High was opened in 1963, but the building was made into a police training academy in 2005. In 1964, the village insignia was replaced, as the newly minted "town" laid claim to 1,500 residents, a designation that lives on today, in the town of about 2,500.

== Geography ==
According to the United States Census Bureau, the town has a total area of 3.6 square miles (9.3 km^{2}), of which 3.5 square miles (9.0 km^{2}) is land and 0.1 square miles (0.2 km^{2}), or 2.27%, is water.

== Demographics ==
Historical population
Census	Pop.	Note	%±
1910	277		—
1920	364		31.4%
1930	264		−27.5%
1940	612		131.8%
1950	637		4.1%
1960	964		51.3%
1970	1,361		41.2%
1980	1,693		24.4%
1990	1,507		−11.0%
2000	1,839		22.0%
2010	2,506		36.3%
2020	2,565		2.4%
2025 (est.)	2,715	▲	5.8%
U.S. Decennial Census

Pearl River racial composition as of 2020
Race	Number	Percentage
White (non-Hispanic)	2,131	83.08%
Black or African American (non-Hispanic)	76	2.96%
Native American	12	0.47%
Asian	14	0.55%
Pacific Islander	3	0.12%
Other/Mixed	155	6.04%
Hispanic or Latino	174	6.78%

As of the 2020 United States census, there were 2,565 people, 902 households, and 639 families residing in the town. At the 2019 American Community Survey, 92.5% of the population was White, 3.8% Black and African American, 3.3% American Indian and Alaska Native, and 0.5% from two or more races. There was a median household income of $56,061 and families lived in 902 housing units. An estimated 13.5% of the population lived at or below the poverty line in 2019.

== Education ==
Residents are zoned to St. Tammany Parish Public Schools schools.

- 1-5: Riverside Elementary School (unincorporated St. Tammany Parish)
- 6-8: Creekside Junior High School (unincorporated St. Tammany Parish)
- 9-12: Pearl River High School (Pearl River)

== Notable people ==
- A. G. Crowe, a native of New Orleans, served 8 years in the Louisiana House of Representatives and 8 years in the Louisiana Senate (2000–2016) as well as a Member of the St. Tammany Parish School Board.
- Owen Hale, former Drummer for Lynyrd Skynyrd

== See also ==
- WOTB: a contemporary Christian radio station in Pearl River
