= 2023 United States elections =

- ← 2021 2022 2023 2024 2025 → Off-year elections
- Election day: November 7 (October 14 in Louisiana)

House elections
- Seats contested: 3 mid-term vacancies
- Net seat change: 0
- Democratic hold Republican hold No election

Gubernatorial elections
- Seats contested: 3
- Net seat change: Republican +1
- Republican gain Democratic hold Republican hold No election

Elections were held in the United States, in large part, on November 7, 2023. The off-year election included gubernatorial and state legislative elections in a few states, as well as numerous citizen initiatives, mayoral races, and a variety of other local offices on the ballot. At least three special elections to the United States Congress were scheduled as either deaths or vacancies arose. The Democratic Party retained control of the governorship in Kentucky, flipped the Wisconsin Supreme Court and held a seat on the Pennsylvania Supreme Court, gained six seats in the New Jersey General Assembly, and won back unified control of the Virginia General Assembly, while Republicans also flipped the governorship in Louisiana and narrowly retained Mississippi's governorship. The election cycle also saw Ohio voting to enshrine abortion rights in the state constitution and legalize cannabis for recreational use. The results were widely seen as a success for the Democratic Party.

The election cycle was generally marked by a trend of strong Democratic overperformances in special elections. Daily Kos and FiveThirtyEight analyses of at least 38 races in September 2023 (Note: These races do not include the 2023 Wisconsin Supreme Court election, city elections, and ballot referendums, which have also seen a trend of Democratic overperformance.) determined that the party outperformed the partisan lean by an average of 10 percent. In comparison, Democrats outperformed by an average of 4 percent in elections held between the 2018 and 2020 elections, and an average of 7.6 percent in elections held in 2020. The 2023 overperformances consisted of unusually larger margins of victory in races held in safely Democratic areas and unusually smaller margins of defeat in races held in safely Republican areas. The results indicate a suburban shift among affluent, college-educated voters that started as an underlying reaction to Donald Trump's election in 2016. While the results were generally in line with predictions, Democrats still outperformed expectations despite the low approval ratings of incumbent Democratic president Joe Biden and polls indicating his middling prospects in the 2024 presidential election.

Both Democratic and Republican operatives attributed the Democrats' overperformance streak to general support of broad abortion rights in the wake of the Supreme Court's Dobbs v. Jackson Women's Health Organization decision. This marked a continuing trend of bipartisan voter support for ballot initiatives on abortion rights since the June 2022 decision. Many conservative political analysts and commentators called a continued Republican alliance with the anti-abortion movement "untenable" and an "electoral disaster", and urged the party to favor abortion rights. Young voters in particular gave overwhelming support for abortion rights. Among voters between 18 and 29 years old in increasingly Republican Ohio, an estimated 77% voted for Ohio Issue 1, including a majority of Republicans. Exit polling indicated Ohioans believed abortion should be "mostly legal" by a margin of 61–36%.

== Federal elections ==
=== House of Representatives ===
Three special elections were held in 2023 to fill vacancies during the 118th U.S. Congress.

- Virginia's 4th congressional district: Democrat Jennifer McClellan defeated Republican Leon Benjamin in the February special election, to succeed Donald McEachin who died on November 28, 2022, of colorectal cancer. The district has a partisan index of D+16.
- Rhode Island's 1st congressional district: Democrat Gabe Amo defeated Republican Gerry Leonard Jr. to succeed David Cicilline, who resigned on May 31, 2023, to become the president and CEO of the Rhode Island Foundation. The district has a partisan index of D+14.
- Utah's 2nd congressional district: Republican Celeste Maloy defeated State Senator Kathleen Riebe, as well as five independent candidates, to succeed Republican Chris Stewart, who resigned on September 15, 2023, due to his wife's ongoing health issues. The district has a partisan index of R+11.

== State elections ==
=== Gubernatorial elections ===
Three states held gubernatorial elections in 2023:

- Kentucky: One-term Democrat Andy Beshear won re-election, defeating Republican nominee Daniel Cameron by a margin of 52.5% to 47.5%.
- Louisiana: Republican attorney general Jeff Landry won outright with 51.6% of the vote, beating his closest competitor, Democrat Shawn Wilson, who earned 25.9%, in a 14-candidate jungle primary, succeeding term-limited Democratic governor John Bel Edwards.
- Mississippi: One-term Republican Tate Reeves won re-election, narrowly defeating Democrat Brandon Presley by a 3.2-point margin of 50.9% to 47.7%.

=== Lieutenant gubernatorial elections ===
Two states held lieutenant gubernatorial elections in 2023:

- Louisiana
- Mississippi

=== Attorney general elections ===
Three states held attorney general elections in 2023:

- Kentucky: One-term Republican Daniel Cameron retired to run for governor. Republican Russell Coleman defeated Democrat Pamela Stevenson by a margin of 58% to 42%.
- Louisiana: Republican Liz Murrill defeated Democrat Lindsey Cheek in the November 18 runoff to succeed incumbent Jeff Landry, who retired to run for governor.
- Mississippi: One-term Republican Lynn Fitch won re-election, defeating Democratic nominee Greta Kemp Martin by a margin of 58.7% to 41.3%.

=== Secretary of state elections ===
Three states held secretary of state elections in 2023:

- Kentucky: One-term Republican Michael Adams won re-election, defeating Democratic nominee Buddy Wheatley by a margin of 60.6% to 39.3%.
- Louisiana: Republican Nancy Landry defeated Democrat Gwen Collins Greenup in a runoff election, succeeding two-term Republican Kyle Ardoin, who retired.
- Mississippi: One-term Republican Michael Watson ran for re-election, defeating Democratic nominee Ty Pinkins by a margin of 60.1% to 39.9%.

=== State treasurer elections ===
Three states held state treasurer elections in 2023:

- Kentucky: Republican Mark Metcalf defeated Democrat Michael Bowman by a margin of 57.2% to 42.8%, succeeding two-term Republican Allison Ball who was term-limited and therefore ran for state auditor.
- Louisiana: Republican John Fleming defeated Democrat Dustin Granger in a runoff to succeed incumbent two-term Republican John Schroder, who retired to run for governor.
- Mississippi: One-term Republican David McRae ran for re-election, defeating Democrat Addie Green by a margin of 59% to 41%.

=== State auditor elections ===
Two states held state auditor elections in 2023:

- Kentucky: Republican Allison Ball defeated Democrat Kim Reeder by a margin of 60.7 % to 30.3%.
- Mississippi: Republican Shad White defeated Democrat Larry Bradford by a margin of 58.6% to 41.4%.

=== State agriculture commissioner elections ===
Three states held agriculture commissioner elections in 2023:

- Kentucky: Republican Jonathan Shell defeated Democrat Sierra Enlow by a margin of 59.3% to 40.7%, succeeding two-term Republican Ryan Quarles, who was term-limited and ran for governor.
- Louisiana: Four-term Republican Michael G. Strain won re-election unopposed.
- Mississippi: Two-term Republican Andy Gipson won re-election, defeating Democrat Robert Bradford by a margin of 58.4% to 41.6%.

=== State supreme court elections ===
Two states, Wisconsin and Pennsylvania, held state Supreme Court elections in 2023:

- Wisconsin: Incumbent justice Patience Roggensack retired. The election for a new justice was held on April 4, 2023. Janet Protasiewicz defeated Daniel Kelly by a margin of 11.02%.
- Pennsylvania: Justice Max Baer died in September 2022. The election for a new justice was held on November 7, 2023. Democratic nominee Daniel McCaffery defeated GOP nominee Carolyn Carluccio by a margin of 6.02%.

=== Legislative ===
Legislative elections were held for both houses of the Louisiana State Legislature, the Mississippi Legislature, the New Jersey Legislature, and the Virginia General Assembly. Kentucky, which holds gubernatorial elections in off-years, holds state legislative elections concurrent with presidential and midterm elections.

In addition, other states held special elections to fill open legislative seats vacated for various reasons (death, retirement, resignation for personal reasons, expulsion, or election to a higher office).

The Democratic Party flipped control of Virginia's lower house, the House of Delegates, which it had lost two years earlier, and retained its majority in Virginia's upper house, the Senate. Democrats also expanded their majority in the lower house of the New Jersey legislature. The Republican Party strengthened its majorities in the Mississippi and Louisiana legislatures.

=== Ballot measures ===
41 ballot measures were held in statewide referendums across eight states: Colorado, Louisiana, Maine, New York, Ohio, Oklahoma, Texas, and Wisconsin.

- In a March special election, Oklahoma voters rejected State Question 820, a ballot initiative that would have legalized the recreational use of marijuana by people 21 and older.
- In an April special election, Wisconsin voters approved three measures all by landslides: Question 1 and Question 2, expanding judges' criteria for setting cash bail; and Question 3, a non-binding question regarding welfare benefits.
- In an August special election, Ohio voters, with more than 57% voting No, rejected a measure that would have required future amendments to the Ohio Constitution to be approved by 60% of the electorate in a referendum rather than a simple majority.
- In November, the following referendums were on the ballot in their respective states.
  - Maine voters rejected a ballot initiative to establish a public power company, but approved a constitutional amendment to require Article X, Sections 1, 2, and 5, to be included in all official printings of the state constitution. The three sections have not been included since 1876, but were never formally repealed. Sections 1 and 2 deal with the convening of the first Maine Legislature; Section 5 deals with the state's obligations to indigenous tribes, among other details of the separation of Maine from Massachusetts.
  - New York voters approved two proposals on the ballot, Proposal One, concerning small city school districts, and Proposal Two, which concerns sewer systems.
  - Ohio voters approved two measures, one that codified abortion rights in the state's constitution, and another, which legalized marijuana for recreational use. Both received more than 56% Yes votes, mirroring the August special election results.
  - Texas voters statewide voted on 14 proposed amendments to the Texas Constitution. All except one passed. In addition, some Texas counties, cities, and school and other special districts had other ballot issues, such as bond proposals.

== Local elections ==
=== Mayoral elections ===
Since the beginning of 2023, elections were held for the office of mayor, as well as several other municipal and county-level positions. Major U.S. cities saw incumbent mayors re-elected, including Montgomery, Alabama (Steven Reed); Tucson, Arizona (Regina Romero); Aurora, Colorado (Mike Coffman); New Haven, Connecticut (Justin Elicker); Orlando (Buddy Dyer) and Tampa, Florida (Jane Castor); Savannah, Georgia (Van R. Johnson); Boise, Idaho (Lauren McLean); Fort Wayne (Tom Henry), Indianapolis (Joe Hogsett), and South Bend, Indiana (James Mueller); Springfield (Domenic Sarno), Worcester, Massachusetts (Joseph Petty); Kansas City, Missouri (Quinton Lucas); Lincoln, Nebraska (Leirion Gaylor Baird); Charlotte, North Carolina (Vi Lyles); Columbus, Ohio (Andrew Ginther); Greenville, South Carolina (Knox H. White); Knoxville, Tennessee (Indya Kincannon); Arlington (Jim Ross), Dallas (Eric Johnson), Fort Worth (Mattie Parker), and San Antonio, Texas (Ron Nirenberg); Salt Lake City, Utah (Erin Mendenhall); Green Bay (Eric Genrich) and Madison, Wisconsin (Satya Rhodes-Conway).

Open mayoral seats were won in Colorado Springs (Yemi Mobolade) and Denver, Colorado (Mike Johnston); Hartford, Connecticut (Arunan Arulampalam); Jacksonville, Florida (Donna Deegan); Carmel (Sue Finkam) and Evansville, Indiana (Stephanie Terry); Des Moines, Iowa (Connie Boesen); Portland, Maine (Mark Dion); Manchester, New Hampshire (Jay Ruais); Durham, North Carolina (Leonardo Williams); Akron, Ohio (Shammas Malik); Philadelphia, Pennsylvania (Cherelle Parker); Memphis (Paul Young) and Nashville, Tennessee (Freddie O'Connell); and Houston, Texas (John Whitmire).

In Bridgeport, Connecticut, two-term incumbent Joe Ganim was declared the winner, although the race remains controversial amid lawsuits surrounding an absentee ballot scandal. In Chicago, Illinois, county commissioner Brandon Johnson defeated former superintendent Paul Vallas in a close election to succeed one-term mayor Lori Lightfoot, who lost re-election in the blanket primary. In Springfield, Illinois, two-term incumbent Jim Langfelder lost re-election to city treasurer Misty Buscher. In Gary, Indiana, state legislator Eddie Melton was elected to replace incumbent Jerome Prince, who lost renomination in the Democratic primary. In Wichita, Kansas, television news anchor Lily Wu defeated one-term incumbent Brandon Whipple in his bid for re-election; in Spokane, Washington, Nadine Woodward also lost re-election to a second term to former state senator Lisa Brown. Mableton, Georgia held its first mayoral election in 2023 after being reincorporated in November 2022. Warren, Michigan held its mayoral election in November 2023.

==== Seats that changed parties ====
- Colorado Springs, Colorado: On May 16, Yemi Mobolade defeated Wayne W. Williams in a runoff election, succeeding two-term incumbent John Suthers, who was term-limited. Independent gain from Republican. (officially nonpartisan)
- Jacksonville, Florida: On May 16, Donna Deegan defeated Daniel Davis in a runoff election, succeeding two-term incumbent Lenny Curry, who was term-limited. Democratic gain from Republican
- Danbury, Connecticut: On November 7, Roberto Alves defeated one-term incumbent Dean Esposito. Democratic gain from Republican
- Evansville, Indiana: On November 7, Stephanie Terry defeated Natalie Rascher and Michael Daugherty, succeeding three-term incumbent Lloyd Winnecke, who retired. Democratic gain from Republican
- Manchester, New Hampshire: On November 7, Jay Ruais defeated Kevin Cavanaugh, succeeding three-term incumbent Joyce Craig, who retired to run for governor in 2024. Republican gain from Democratic (officially nonpartisan)
- Spokane, Washington: On November 7, Lisa Brown defeated one-term incumbent Nadine Woodward. Democratic gain from Republican (officially nonpartisan)
- Terre Haute, Indiana: On November 7, Brandon Sakbun defeated four-term incumbent Duke Bennett. Democratic gain from Republican
- Wichita, Kansas: On November 7, Lily Wu defeated one-term incumbent Brandon Whipple. Libertarian gain from Democratic (officially nonpartisan)
- Charleston, South Carolina: On November 21, William Cogswell defeated two-term incumbent John Tecklenburg in a runoff. Republican gain from Democratic (officially nonpartisan)

=== Other local elections ===
This is a partial list of notable or major elections.

- Allegheny County, Pennsylvania: County Executive, District Attorney, Board of Legislators
- Chicago, Illinois: City Council, City Clerk, City Treasurer, Police District Councils
- Cincinnati, Ohio: City Council
- Columbus, Ohio: City Council (two new seats), Board of Education
- Gaithersburg, Maryland: City Council
- Los Angeles, California: City Council (special election)
- Duluth, Minnesota: Mayor, City Council
- Minneapolis, Minnesota: City Council
- New York, New York: City Council
- Philadelphia, Pennsylvania: City Council
- Seattle, Washington: City Council
- St. Louis, Missouri: Board of Aldermen
- Suffolk County, New York: County Executive
- Tucker, Georgia: City Council
- Fall River, Massachusetts: City Council and School Committee

== Tribal elections ==
Several Native American tribes held elections for tribal executive and other positions during 2023.

The Cherokee Nation held elections for principal chief, deputy chief, and eight of the seventeen Tribal Council seats on June 3. Principal chief Chuck Hoskin Jr. and deputy chief Bryan Warner were re-elected. Five councilors were elected on June 3 and three were elected on July 8 after a runoff. Also on June 3, the Iowa Tribe of Oklahoma held elections for chairman and treasurer of the tribe. Jacob Keyes was narrowly elected chairman, beating challenger Alexandria Harjo by six votes, and Judy Barnes was elected treasurer. On June 8, the Mississippi Band of Choctaw Indians reelected Tribal Chief Cyrus Ben to a second term with 61.6% of the vote. Eight tribal council members were also reelected.

On July 8, the Choctaw Nation of Oklahoma held a general election for Tribal Council, reelecting four incumbents. Two other incumbent councilors, along with Choctaw Nation Chief Gary Batton, were unopposed in seeking reelection. Tehassiʔtasi Hill was reelected on July 15 to a third term as chair of the Oneida Nation of Wisconsin. Vice Chairman Brandon Yellowbird–Stevens and Secretary Lisa Liggins were also reelected. Larry Barton was elected treasurer over the incumbent, Curtis Danforth. In a July 22 special election, Wena Supernaw was elected to succeed Joseph Tali Byrd who resigned as chairman of the Quapaw Nation in April 2023. In the Chickasaw Nation's July 25 election, Governor Bill Anoatubby and Lieutenant Governor Chris Anoatubby were unopposed in seeking reelection. Four tribal council members were also unopposed and thus reelected. A fifth tribal council seat was won by challenger Dusk Monetathchi in an August runoff.

In September, Eastern Band of Cherokee Indians former principal chief Michell Hicks defeated incumbent chief Richard Sneed. Hicks previously served three terms as chief from 2003 to 2015. Incumbent vice chief Alan "B" Ensley was reelected. On September 16, Muscogee Nation voters reelected Principal Chief David Hill and Second Chief Del Beaver.

In October, the Port Gamble S'Klallam Tribe elected Amber Caldera as tribal chair in a special election following the death of the previous PGST chairman, Jeromy Sullivan. Also, the Qawalangin Tribe of Unalaska elected Nick Tutiakoff as tribal president, replacing Dennis Robinson who remained on the tribal council. Vicki Williams was elected vice president.

=== Referendums ===
- The Eastern Band of Cherokee Indians passed by a wide margin an advisory referendum approving adult use of recreational cannabis use on tribal land with 70% of voters approving the measure. A second referendum on the ballot allowing the sale of by-the-glass mixed drinks was also approved.
