= 2023 United States gubernatorial elections =

- November 7, 2023; October 14 (Louisiana)

3 governorships
	Majority party	Minority party
Party	Republican	Democratic
Seats before	26	24
Seats after	27	23
Seat change	▲1	▼1
Popular vote	1,741,855	1,389,283
Percentage	54.34%	43.34%
Seats up	1	2
Races won	2	1
- Republican gain Democratic hold Republican hold

United States gubernatorial elections were held on November 7, 2023, in the states of Kentucky and Mississippi, with an election having occurred in Louisiana on October 14. These elections form part of the 2023 United States elections. The last regular gubernatorial elections for all three states were in 2019.

In Louisiana, term-limited incumbent John Bel Edwards was succeeded by Jeff Landry, flipping the seat from Democratic to Republican control. In Kentucky, Democrat Andy Beshear won re-election to a second term. In Mississippi, Republican Tate Reeves won re-election to a second term.

== Partisan composition ==
Going into the election, there were 26 Republican governors and 24 Democratic governors in the United States. This class of governors was made up of 1 Republican and 2 Democrats. Democrats were defending two governorships in states Donald Trump won in 2020 (Kentucky and Louisiana).

== Election predictions ==
Several sites and individuals published predictions of competitive seats. These predictions looked at factors such as the strength of the incumbent (if the incumbent is running for re-election), the strength of the candidates, and the partisan leanings of the state (reflected in part by the state's Cook Partisan Voting Index rating). The predictions assigned ratings to each seat, with the rating indicating a party's predicted advantage in winning that seat.

Most election predictors use:

- "tossup": no advantage
- "tilt" (used by some predictors): advantage that is not quite as strong as "lean"
- "lean": slight advantage
- "likely": significant, but surmountable, advantage
- "safe" or "solid": near-certain chance of victory

State	PVI	Incumbent	Last race	Cook October 23, 2023	IE September 1, 2023	Sabato October 16, 2023	ED November 7, 2023	Result
Kentucky	R+16	Andy Beshear	49.20% D	Lean D	Tilt D	Lean D	Lean D	Beshear; 52.53% D
Louisiana	R+12	John Bel Edwards (term-limited)	51.33% D	Lean R (flip)	Likely R (flip)	Likely R (flip)	Safe R (flip)	Landry; 51.56% R (flip)
Mississippi	R+11	Tate Reeves	51.91% R	Lean R	Lean R	Likely R	Likely R	Reeves; 50.94% R

== Race summary ==
State	Incumbent	Party	First elected	Result	General election
Kentucky	Andy Beshear	Democratic	2019	Incumbent re-elected.	▌ ✓ Andy Beshear (Democratic) 52.5%; ▌Daniel Cameron (Republican) 47.5%
Louisiana	John Bel Edwards	Democratic	2015	Incumbent term-limited. Republican gain.	▌ ✓ Jeff Landry (Republican) 51.6%; ▌Shawn Wilson (Democratic) 25.9%; ▌Stephen Waguespack (Republican) 5.9%; ▌John Schroder (Republican) 5.3%; Others: ▌Hunter Lundy (Independent) 4.9%; ▌Danny Cole (Democratic) 2.6%; ▌Sharon Hewitt (Republican) 1.7%; ▌Benjamin Barnes (Independent) 0.5%; ▌Patrick "Dat" Barthel (Republican) 0.4%; ▌Richard Nelson (Republican) 0.3%; ▌Jeffrey Istre (Independent) 0.3%; ▌Xavier Ellis (Republican) 0.2%; ▌Keitron Gagnon (Independent) 0.1%; ▌Xan John (Republican) 0.1%; ▌Frank Scurlock (Independent) 0.1%
Mississippi	Tate Reeves	Republican	2019	Incumbent re-elected.	▌ ✓ Tate Reeves (Republican) 50.9%; ▌Brandon Presley (Democratic) 47.7%; ▌Gwendolyn Gray (Independent) 1.4%

== Closest states ==
States where the margin of victory was between 1% and 5%:

1. Mississippi, 3.24%

States where the margin of victory was between 5% and 10%:

1. Kentucky, 5.07%

Red denotes states won by Republicans. Blue denotes states won by Democrats.

== Kentucky ==
Kentucky gubernatorial election
- Turnout: 38.0% ▼
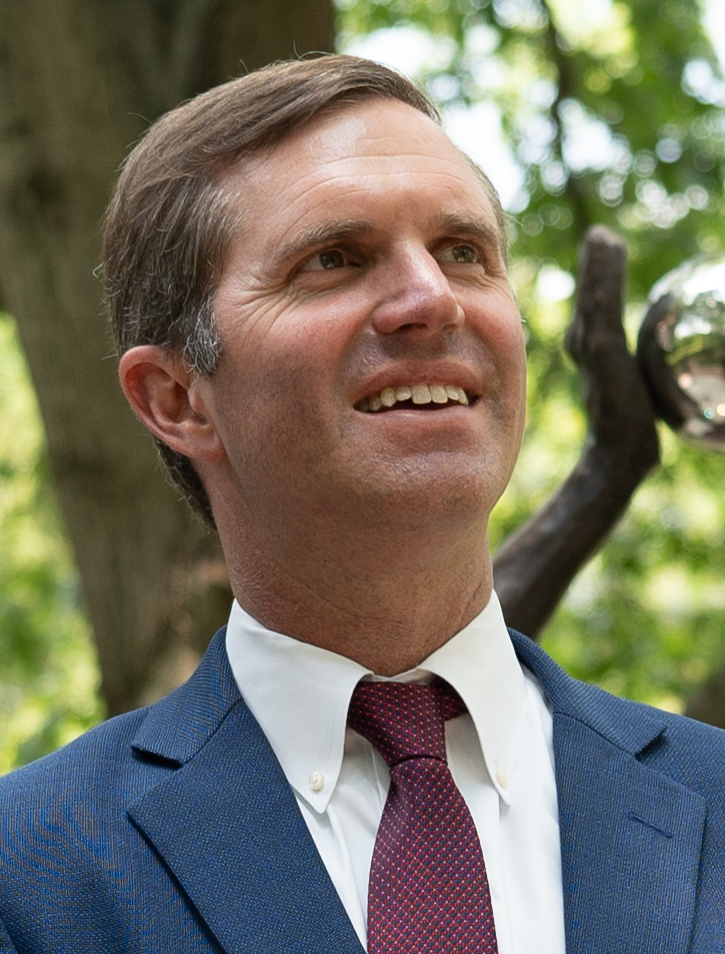

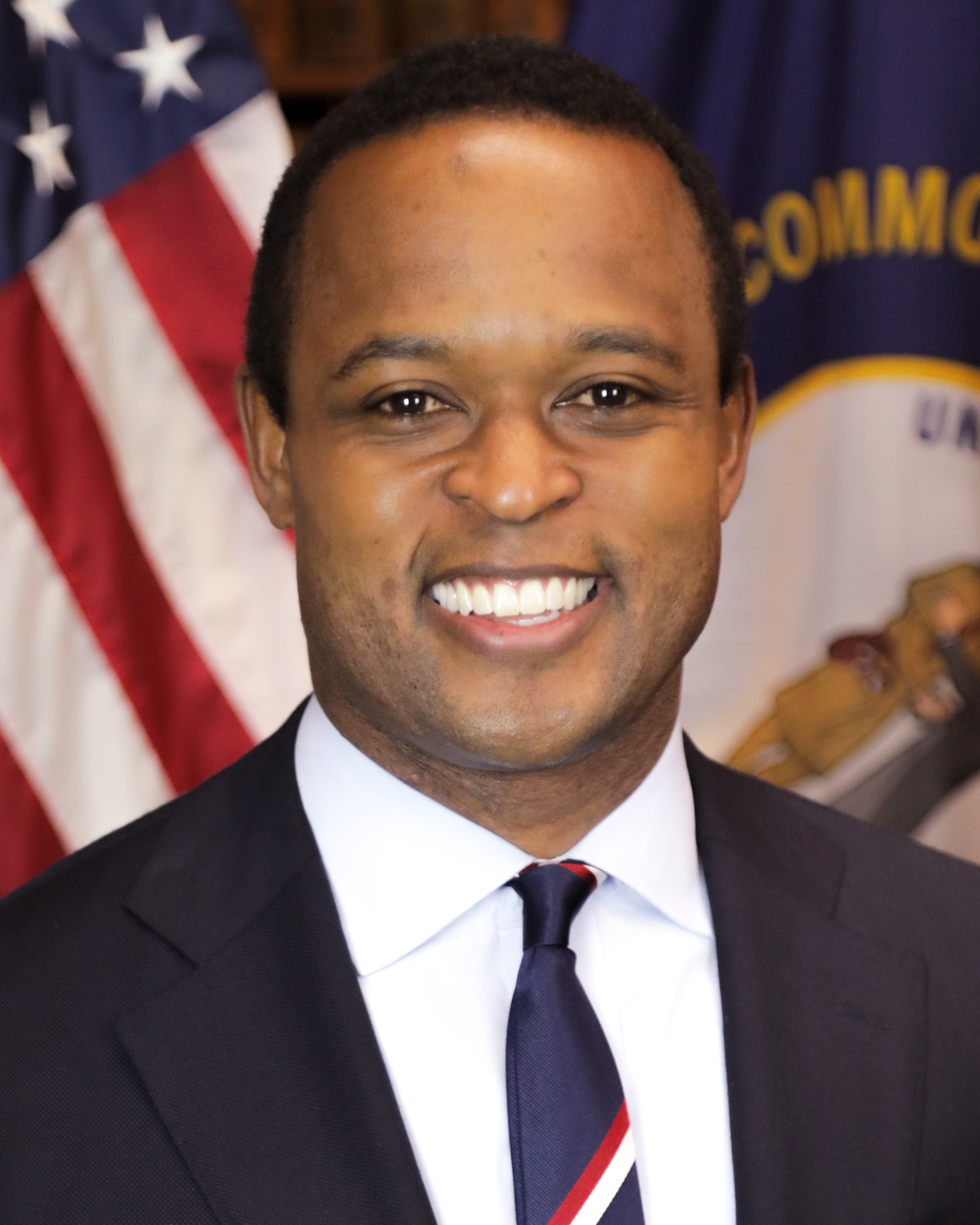
Nominee	Andy Beshear	Daniel Cameron
Party	Democratic	Republican
Running mate	Jacqueline Coleman	Robby Mills
Popular vote	694,482	627,457
Percentage	52.53%	47.46%
- Beshear: 50–60% 60–70% 70–80% Cameron: 50–60% 60–70% 70–80%
Governor before election
Andy Beshear
Democratic
Elected Governor
Andy Beshear
Democratic

Governor Andy Beshear was elected in 2019 with 49.2% of the vote and ran for re-election to a second term. He won the Democratic nomination with little opposition & won the general election.

Attorney general Daniel Cameron, former US Ambassador to the UN Kelly Craft, state auditor Mike Harmon, and agriculture commissioner Ryan Quarles all ran for the Republican gubernatorial nomination. Cameron was supported by former president Donald Trump, and led every poll leading to the primary, with Craft and Quarles trailing behind him. Cameron won the Republican nomination, becoming the first African American major party gubernatorial nominee in Kentucky's history.

Democratic primary results
Party	Candidate	Votes	%
Democratic	Andy Beshear (incumbent)	176,589	91.3
Democratic	Geoff Young	9,865	5.1
Democratic	Peppy Martin	6,913	3.6
Total votes		193,367	100.0

Republican primary results
Party	Candidate	Votes	%
Republican	Daniel Cameron	144,576	47.7
Republican	Ryan Quarles	65,718	21.7
Republican	Kelly Craft	52,170	17.2
Republican	Eric Deters	17,464	5.8
Republican	Mike Harmon	7,797	2.6
Republican	Alan Keck	7,317	2.4
Republican	David Cooper	2,282	0.8
Republican	Jacob Clark	1,900	0.6
Republican	Robbie Smith	1,388	0.5
Republican	Bob DeVore	931	0.3
Republican	Johnny Rice	726	0.2
Republican	Dennis Ormerod	696	0.2
Total votes		302,965	100.0

2023 Kentucky gubernatorial election
Party	Candidate	Votes	%	±%
Democratic	Andy Beshear (incumbent); Jacqueline Coleman (incumbent)	694,482	52.53%	+3.33%
Republican	Daniel Cameron; Robby Mills	627,457	47.46%	−1.37%
Write-in		82	0.01%	N/A
Total votes		1,322,021	100.00%	
Democratic hold				

== Louisiana ==
2023 Louisiana gubernatorial election
- October 14, 2023
- Turnout: 36.3% ▼
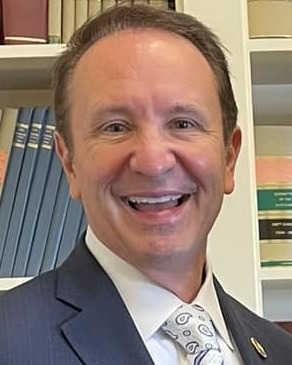

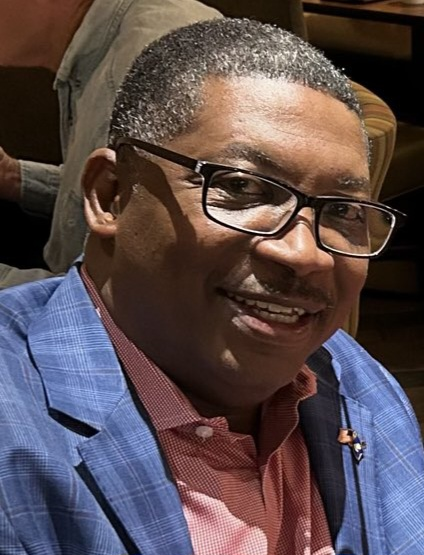

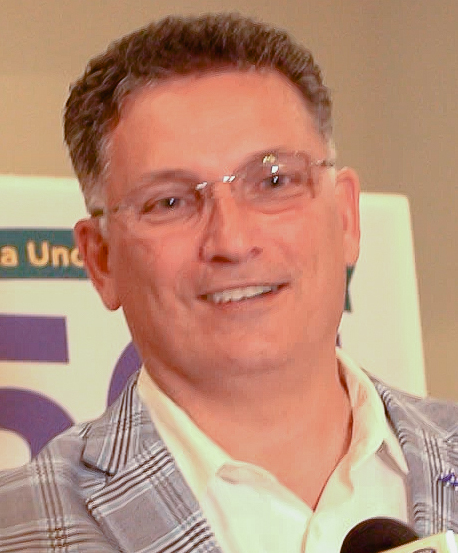
Candidate	Jeff Landry	Shawn Wilson
Party	Republican	Democratic
Popular vote	547,827	275,525
Percentage	51.6%	25.9%
Candidate	Stephen Waguespack	John Schroder
Party	Republican	Republican
Popular vote	62,287	56,654
Percentage	5.9%	5.3%
- Landry: 30–40% 40–50% 50–60% 60–70% 70–80% 80–90% Wilson: 40–50% 70–80%
Governor before election
John Bel Edwards
Democratic
Elected Governor
Jeff Landry
Republican

Governor John Bel Edwards was re-elected to a second term in 2019 with 51.3% of the vote. He was term-limited by the Louisiana Constitution in 2023, and could not seek reelection for a third consecutive term.

Louisiana utilizes a jungle primary system. Republican Attorney General Jeff Landry was considered the frontrunner. Other candidates included state senator Sharon Hewitt, and Treasurer John Schroder. Democratic Secretary of Transportation Shawn Wilson also ran to succeed Edwards.

Landry won with over 51% of the vote in the primary, becoming the first person to win a Louisiana gubernatorial election without a runoff since Bobby Jindal in 2011. Landry easily prevailed over several Republican opponents and the leading Democratic candidate. All the Republican candidates collectively won 65.52% of the vote, including a candidate who got 0.34% of the vote as he dropped out of the race but remained on the ballot. All the Democrats collectively won 28.53% of the vote, and all the Independents collectively won 5.95% of the vote. This was the only governorship to flip parties in the 2023 elections.

2023 Louisiana gubernatorial election
Party	Candidate	Votes	%
Republican	Jeff Landry	547,827	51.56%
Democratic	Shawn Wilson	275,525	25.93%
Republican	Stephen Waguespack	62,287	5.86%
Republican	John Schroder	56,654	5.33%
Independent	Hunter Lundy	52,165	4.91%
Democratic	Danny Cole	27,662	2.60%
Republican	Sharon Hewitt	18,468	1.74%
Independent	Benjamin Barnes	5,190	0.49%
Republican	Dat Barthel	4,426	0.42%
Republican	Richard Nelson (withdrawn)	3,605	0.34%
Independent	Jeffery Istre	3,400	0.32%
Republican	Xavier Ellis	1,734	0.16%
Independent	Keitron Gagnon	1,260	0.12%
Republican	Xan John	1,164	0.11%
Independent	Frank Scurlock	1,131	0.11%
Total votes		1,062,498	100.00%
Republican gain from Democratic			

== Mississippi ==
Mississippi gubernatorial election
- Turnout: 42.6%
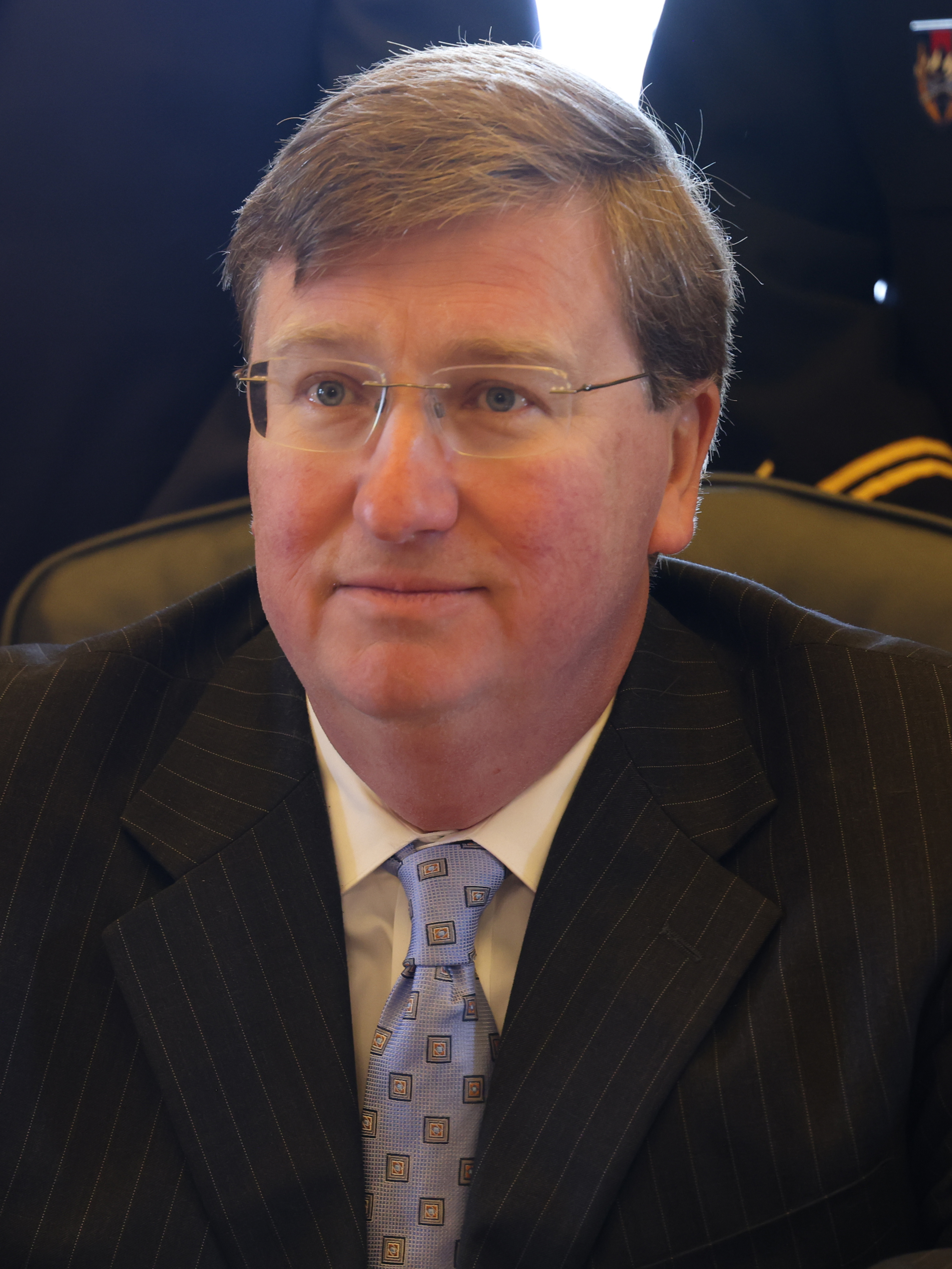

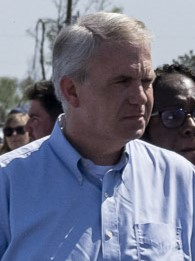
Nominee	Tate Reeves	Brandon Presley
Party	Republican	Democratic
Popular vote	418,233	391,614
Percentage	50.9%	47.7%
- Reeves: 40–50% 50–60% 60–70% 70–80% 80–90% Presley: 40–50% 50–60% 60–70% 70–80% 80–90%
Governor before election
Tate Reeves
Republican
Elected Governor
Tate Reeves
Republican

Governor Tate Reeves was elected in 2019 with 51.9% of the vote and ran for re-election to a second term.

Democrat Brandon Presley, Mississippi Public Service Commissioner for the Northern District, was the Democratic nominee to challenge Reeves.

Reeves won re-election.

Republican primary results
Party	Candidate	Votes	%
Republican	Tate Reeves (incumbent)	281,213	74.7
Republican	John Witcher	66,698	17.7
Republican	David Grady Hardigree	28,561	7.6
Total votes		376,472	100.0

Democratic primary results
Party	Candidate	Votes	%
Democratic	Brandon Presley	196,307	100.0
Total votes		196,307	100.0

2023 Mississippi gubernatorial election
Party	Candidate	Votes	%	±%
Republican	Tate Reeves (incumbent)	418,233	50.94	–0.97
Democratic	Brandon Presley	391,614	47.70	+0.87
Independent	Gwendolyn Gray (withdrawn)	11,153	1.36	N/A
Total votes		821,000	100.00	
Republican hold				

== See also ==
- List of elections in 2023
