= Katie Bernhardt =

American politician and businessperson

Chair of the Louisiana Democratic Party
- In office September 13, 2020 – April 13, 2024
- Preceded by: Karen Carter Peterson
- Succeeded by: Randal Gaines

Personal details
- Political party: Democratic
- Children: 4
- Education: University of Louisiana, Monroe (BA); Louisiana State University (JD)

Katie Bernhardt served as the chair of the Louisiana Democratic Party from September 2020 through April 2024.

== Career ==
Bernhardt graduated from Louisiana State University Law Center. Bernhardt and her husband operate Standard Law in Lafayette, Louisiana. She served as a member on the Democratic state central committee and executive committee for four years.

In September 2020, Bernhardt was elected to a four year term as the chair of the Louisiana Democratic Party 127 to 51 against Lynda Woolard, a party organizer. She succeeded Karen Carter Peterson. Bernhardt campaigned on her ability to reverse the party's decline in the state and appeal to moderate and rural voters. She addressed the North and South divide in Louisiana Democratic politics. Bernhardt had aimed to modernize the party. She established the Louisiana Democratic disability caucus and the Democratic women's caucus. She has reinstituted groups for young Democrats.

In January 2023, Bernhardt signaled interest but did not officially announce that she would run in the 2023 Louisiana gubernatorial election. Her political advertisement sparked criticism among some party members, prompting first vice chairman C. Travis Johnson to stepdown. She also faced calls to resign, mainly from progressives while other party members came to her defense. In February 2023, Bernhardt announced that she was not running in the gubernatorial election. She later announced her support of gubernatorial candidate Shawn Wilson.

At the April 2024 party meetings, Bernhardt was not nominated for State Party Chair, meaning she could not be re-elected.

Party political offices
Preceded by Karen Carter Peterson	Chair of the Louisiana Democratic Party; 2020–2024	Succeeded by Randal Gaines
