= 2025 Fort Worth mayoral election =

Municipal election in Fort Worth, Texas

- May 3, 2025
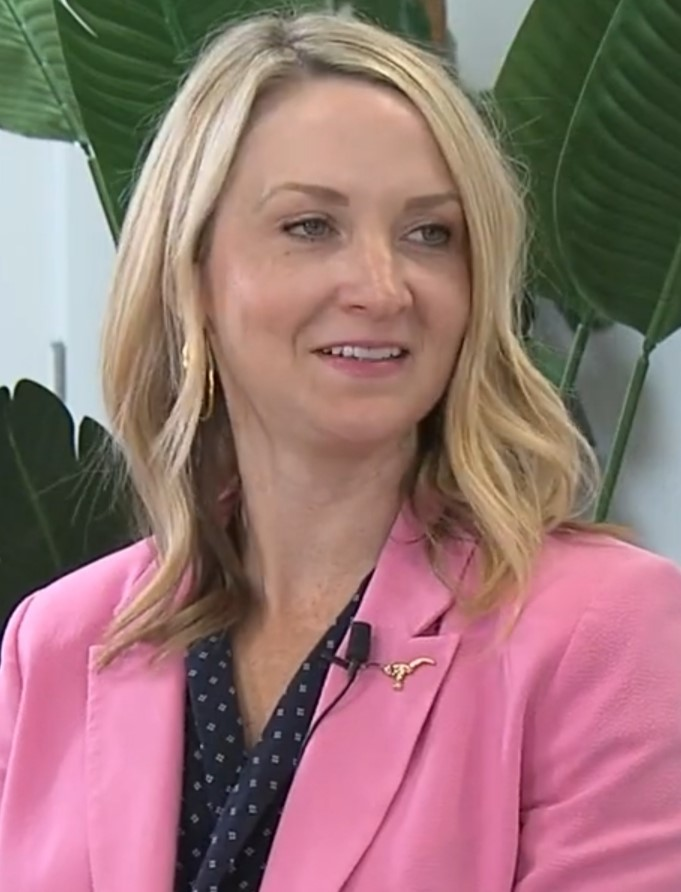

Candidate	Mattie Parker	Josh Lucas
Popular vote	26,104	7,005
Percentage	66.54%	17.86%
Mayor before election
Mattie Parker
Elected mayor
Mattie Parker

The 2025 Fort Worth mayoral election took place on May 3, 2025. Incumbent mayor Mattie Parker was re-elected to a third two-year term in office.

== Candidates ==
=== Declared ===
- Donnell Ballard, nonprofit founder and podcast host
- Alyson Kennedy, perennial candidate, facility cleaner, and candidate in 2023 (Party affiliation: Socialist Workers)
- Jeremy F. Labelle, landscaper
- Josh Lucas, community ministries coordinator (Party affiliation: Democrat)
- Mattie Parker, incumbent mayor (Party affiliation: Republican)
- Lawrence Walker, entrepreneur
- Chris Wood, website developer
- Millennium Anton C. Woods Jr., private contractor and activist

== Endorsements ==
Josh Lucas

Organizations

- Tarrant County Young Democrats

Political parties

- Tarrant County Democratic Party
Mattie Parker

Organizations

- Fort Worth Police Officers Association

Newspapers and other publications

- Fort Worth Star-Telegram

== Results ==
2025 Fort Worth mayoral general election
Candidate	Votes	%
Mattie Parker	26,104	66.54
Josh Lucas	7,005	17.86
Alyson Kennedy	1,651	4.21
Chris Wood	1,191	3.04
Donnell Ballard	1,054	2.69
Lawrence Walker	1,019	2.60
Millenium Woods	1,004	2.56
Jeremy Labelle	204	0.52
Total votes	39,232	100.00
