= Louisiana's 89th House of Representatives district =

American legislative district

Louisiana's 89th State House of Representatives district
Representative
Kim Carver; R–Mandeville

Louisiana's 89th House of Representatives district is one of 105 Louisiana House of Representatives districts. It is currently represented by Republican Kim Carver.

== Geography ==
HD89 includes the entire city of Mandeville and the surrounding area.

== Election results ==
Year	Winning candidate	Party	Percent	Opponent	Party	Percent
2011	Timothy Burns	Republican	69.1%	Pat Phillips	Republican	30.9%
2015	Reid Falconer	Republican	66%	Pat Phillips	Republican	34%
2019	Richard Nelson	Republican	53.3%	Vince Liuzza	Republican	46.7%
2023	Kim Carver	Republican	53.9%	Joshua Allison	Republican	46.1%
