= Ron Henson =

American Louisiana state government administrator

Ron J. Henson

First Assistant Treasurer of Louisiana
- In office 2017–present
- Governor: John Bel Edwards
- Preceded by: John N. Kennedy
- Succeeded by: John Schroder

Personal details
- Born: Searcy, Arkansas, U.S.
- Party: Republican
- Education: University of Arkansas; Louisiana Tech University (B.S.)

Ron J. Henson is an American government administrator serving as First Assistant Treasurer of Louisiana. He has worked within the Louisiana State Treasurer’s Office in an administrative capacity.

== Early life and education ==
Henson was born in Searcy, Arkansas, and grew up in El Dorado, Arkansas. He holds a Bachelor of Science degree in Business Administration from Louisiana Tech University in Ruston, Louisiana and attended the University of Arkansas. He has also completed Executive Finance courses at the Kellogg School of Management at Northwestern University in Illinois.

== Career ==
He previously served for 17 years as John Neely Kennedy’s first assistant state treasurer, where he managed a budget in excess of $10 million and more than 80 employees.

Henson is a 40 plus year veteran of state government and has held a variety of positions including undersecretary for the Louisiana Department of Economic Development and Louisiana Department of Culture, Recreation and Tourism. He was deputy chief of staff to Governor Buddy Roemer and served as special assistant to Lieutenant Governor Melinda Schwegmann. He served for 14 years in the Louisiana Legislative Fiscal Office.

In 2014, Henson was the recipient of the prestigious Monte M. Lemann Award for his outstanding contributions to the civil service merit system. He has volunteered his time for numerous non-profit and governmental organizations including the National WWII Museum board of directors, the Gregory K. Burchell Memorial Scholarship Fund, and the Louisiana Business and Technology Center board.

== Treasurer of Louisiana ==
Ron J. Henson was sworn in as the 23rd Treasurer of Louisiana on January 7, 2017, following Kennedy's election to the United States Senate. A special election was held on November 18, 2017. As treasurer, Henson oversaw nearly $5 billion in state investments; chairs the State Bond Commission; and returns millions of dollars in unclaimed property to Louisiana citizens.

Political offices
Preceded by John Kennedy	Treasurer of Louisiana; Acting; 2017	Succeeded by John Schroder
