= Randal Gaines =

American politician (born 1955)

Chair of the Louisiana Democratic Party
- Incumbent
- Assumed office April 13, 2024
- Preceded by: Katie Bernhardt

Personal details
- Born: November 7, 1955 (age 70) LaPlace, Louisiana, U.S.
- Party: Democratic
- Education: Southern University (BA, JD)

Randal Gaines (born November 7, 1955) is an American politician from the state of Louisiana. He served in the Louisiana House of Representatives and is a member of the Democratic Party.

Gaines is an attorney from LaPlace, Louisiana. He served in the United States Army for three years and in the Louisiana National Guard for 25 years, including in Operation Desert Storm and Hurricane Katrina. He became a lieutenant colonel. He has also worked as a tax attorney for the Internal Revenue Service, an assistant city attorney for the New Orleans, and an associate professor and director of the Criminal Justice Department at Southern University. Governor Bobby Jindal appointed Gaines to Southern University's board of supervisors in 2009.

In 2007, Gaines ran for the 57th district seat in the Louisiana House, but lost the election to Nickie Monica. He ran again and was elected to the Louisiana House in 2011. He was unopposed for reelection in 2015 and 2019, when his only challenger was disqualified from running. Gaines could not run for reelection in 2023 due to term limits.

On April 13, 2024, Gaines won election as the chair of the Louisiana Democratic Party, defeating incumbent Katie Bernhardt.

Party political offices
Preceded by Katie Bernhardt	Chair of the Louisiana Democratic Party; 2024–present	Incumbent
