= 2023 Fort Worth mayoral election =

- May 6, 2023
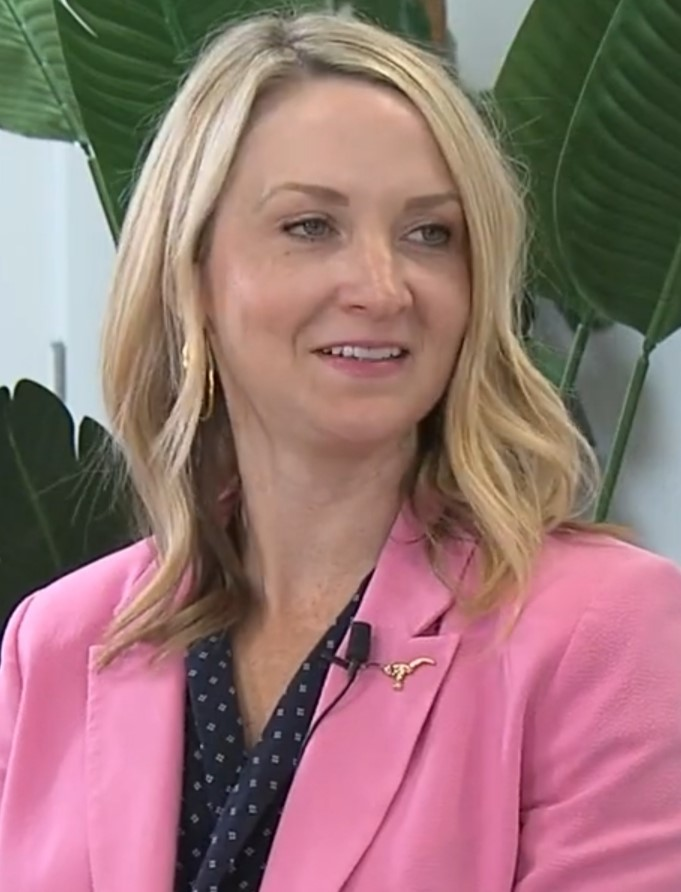

| Candidate | Mattie Parker | Jennifer Castillo |
| Popular vote | 30,118 | 5,315 |
| Percentage | 69.3% | 12.2% |
| Candidate | Kenneth Bowens, Jr. | Alyson Kennedy |
| Popular vote | 3,793 | 2,276 |
| Percentage | 8.7% | 5.2% |
Mayor before election
Mattie Parker
Elected mayor
Mattie Parker

The 2023 Fort Worth mayoral election was held on May 6, 2023, to elect the mayor of Fort Worth, Texas. The election was officially nonpartisan. Incumbent Republican mayor Mattie Parker won re-election to a second two-year term in office.

== Candidates ==
=== Declared ===
- Ken Bowens Jr., entrepreneur (Party affiliation: Independent)
- Jennifer Castillo, realtor
- Alyson Kennedy, cashier and perennial candidate (Party affiliation: Socialist Workers)
- Mattie Parker, incumbent mayor (Party affiliation: Republican)
- Chris Rector, author and candidate in 2021
- Adrian Smith, veteran

=== Declined ===
- Ramon Romero Jr., Texas state representative (Party affiliation: Democratic)

== Results ==
2023 Fort Worth mayoral election
| Candidate | Votes | % |
|---|---|---|
| Mattie Parker (incumbent) | 30,118 | 69.32 |
| Jennifer Castillo | 5,315 | 12.23 |
| Kenneth Bowens Jr. | 3,793 | 8.73 |
| Alyson Kennedy | 2,276 | 5.24 |
| Adrian Smith | 1,948 | 4.48 |
| Total votes | 43,450 | 100.00 |
