= 2021 Fort Worth mayoral election =

- May 1, 2021
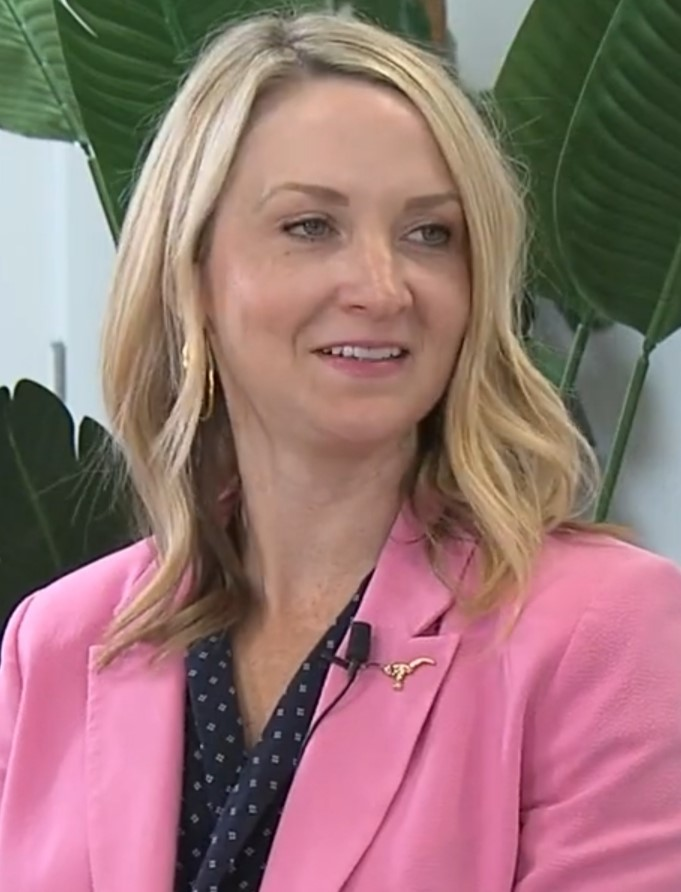

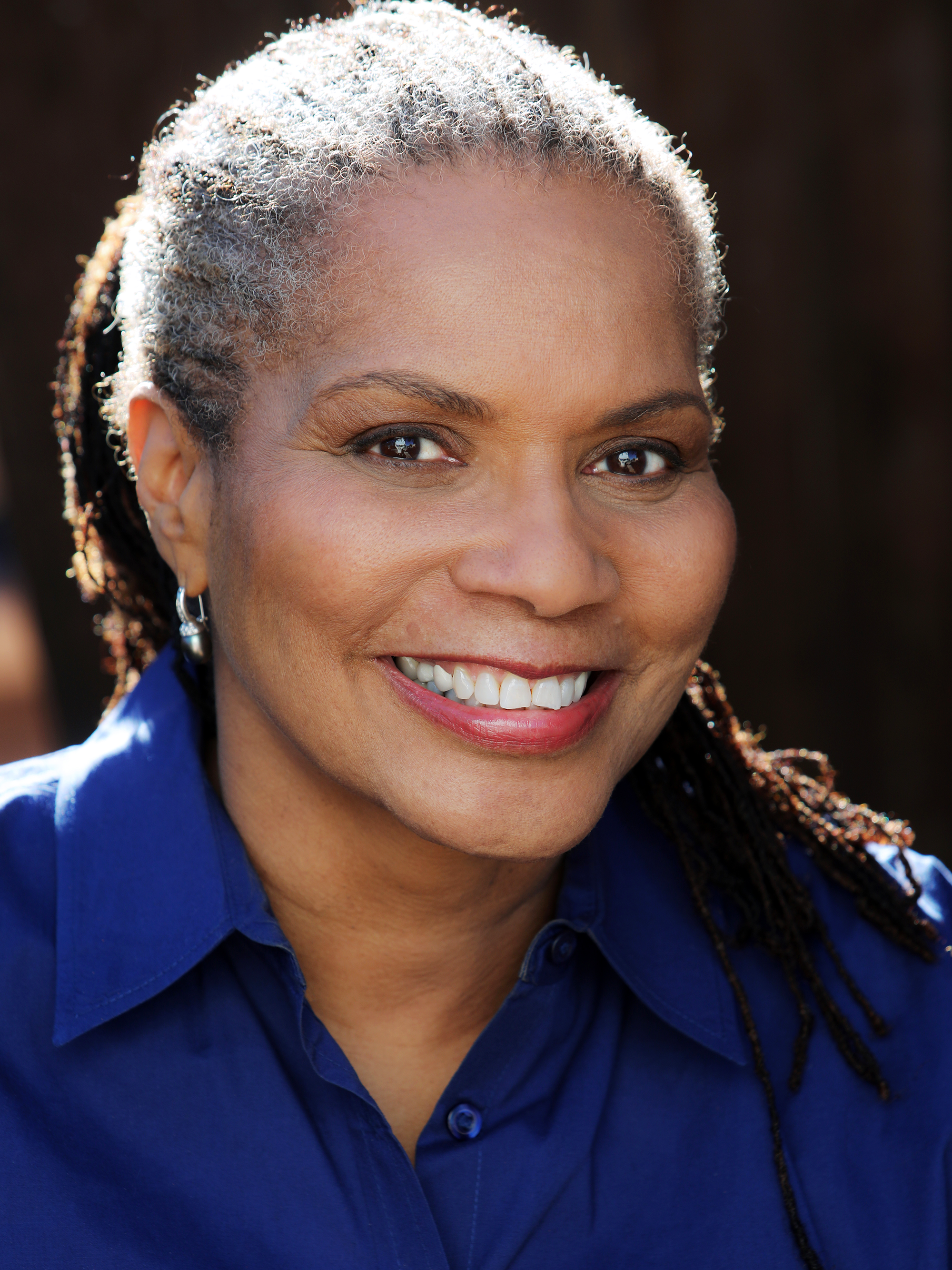

Candidate	Mattie Parker	Deborah Peoples	Brian Byrd
First round	20,890; 30.89%	22,529; 33.31%	9,923; 14.67%
Runoff	47,283; 53.55%	41,012; 46.45%	Eliminated
Candidate	Steve Penate	Ann Zadeh
First round	6,436; 9.52%	5,794; 8.57%
Runoff	Eliminated	Eliminated
Mayor before election
Betsy Price
Nonpartisan
Elected mayor
Mattie Parker
Nonpartisan

The 2021 Fort Worth mayoral election was held on Saturday, May 1, 2021, to decide the mayor of Fort Worth, Texas. Incumbent mayor Betsy Price, who had served as the city's mayor since 2011, announced on January 6, 2021, that she would not seek a sixth term. Ten candidates ran in the primary election. Early voting in person began on April 19, 2021. Since no candidate received a majority of the vote on May 1, the top two finishers, Democrat Deborah Peoples and Republican Mattie Parker, advanced to a June 5, 2021, runoff election. Parker won the runoff and was elected mayor.

== General election ==
=== Candidates ===
==== Declared ====
- Brian Byrd, city councillor
- Daniel "DC" Caldwell I, educator
- Mylene George, marketing coordinator
- Mike Haynes, businessman
- Cedric C. Kanyinda, IT professional
- Mattie Parker, non-profit executive and former chief of staff for Mayor Betsy Price (party preference: Republican)
- Steve Penate, real estate broker
- Deborah Peoples, former chair of the Tarrant County Democratic Party and candidate for mayor in 2019 (party preference: Democratic)
- Chris Rector, author and military veteran
- Ann Zadeh, city councillor

==== Declined ====
- Tim Carter, banker and chair of the board at Texas Wesleyan University
- Dee Kelly Jr., attorney
- Betsy Price, incumbent mayor (party preference: Republican)

=== Endorsements ===
Mattie Parker

Federal officials

- Pete Geren, former Secretary of the Army (2007–2009) and U.S. representative for Texas's 12th congressional district (1989–1997)

State officials

- Craig Goldman, state representative, District 97
- Phil King, state representative, District 61
- Robert Orr, former state representative, District 58 (2005–2015)

Local officials

- Brian Byrd, city councillor
- Mike Moncrief, former mayor (2003–2011)
- Betsy Price, incumbent mayor
- Dennis Shingleton, city councillor

Organizations

- Fort Worth Police Officers Association
- Fort Worth Professional Firefighters Association
Deborah Peoples

Federal officials

- Julian Castro, former secretary of Housing and Urban Development
- Jaime Harrison, chairman of the Democratic National Committee
- Eddie Bernice Johnson, U.S. representative for Texas's 30th congressional district
- Beto O'Rourke, former U.S. representative for Texas's 16th congressional district (2013–2019)
- Marc Veasey, U.S. representative for Texas's 33rd congressional district

City officials

- Keisha Lance Bottoms, mayor of Atlanta
- Latoya Cantrell, mayor of New Orleans

County officials

- Roy Brooks, Tarrant County commissioner
- Michael Campbell, Tarrant County constable
- Sandra Lee, Tarrant County constable

State officials

- Nicole Collier, state representative, District 95
- Ramon Romero Jr., state representative, District 90
- Chris Turner, state representative, District 101
- Royce West, state senator, District 23

Organizations

- AFL–CIO of Tarrant County
- The Collective PAC
- EMILY's List
- North Side Community
- Tarrant County Central Labor Council
- Tarrant County DP AAPI committee
- Tarrant County Latinx Voter Outreach committee
- Texas Democratic Party
- Working Families Party

Individuals

- Robert Hughes, basketball coach
- Lupe Valdez, former Dallas County sheriff and nominee for governor of Texas in 2018

=== Results ===
2021 Fort Worth mayoral primary election results
Party	Candidate	Votes	%
Nonpartisan	Deborah Peoples	22,529	33.31
Nonpartisan	Mattie Parker	20,890	30.89
Nonpartisan	Brian Byrd	9,923	14.67
Nonpartisan	Steve Penate	6,436	9.52
Nonpartisan	Ann Zadeh	5,794	8.57
Nonpartisan	Mike Haynes	996	1.47
Nonpartisan	Cedric Kayinda	346	0.51
Nonpartisan	Daniel Caldwell	330	0.49
Nonpartisan	Chris Rector	322	0.48
Nonpartisan	Mylene George	59	0.09
Total ballots		67,625	100.00

== Runoff ==
=== Candidates ===
- Mattie Parker, former chief of staff to incumbent mayor Betsy Price (Republican)
- Deborah Peoples, former chair of the Tarrant County Democratic Party (Democratic)

=== Endorsements ===
Mattie Parker

Federal officials

- Pete Geren, former Secretary of the Army (2007–2009) and U.S. representative for Texas's 12th congressional district (1989–1997)

State officials

- Greg Abbott, incumbent governor of Texas
- Craig Goldman, state representative, District 97
- Phil King, state representative, District 61
- Robert Orr, former state representative, District 58 (2005–2015)

Local officials

- Brian Byrd, city councillor
- Mike Moncrief, former mayor (2003–2011)
- Betsy Price, retiring mayor
- Dennis Shingleton, city councillor

Organizations

- Fort Worth Police Officers Association
- Fort Worth Professional Firefighters Association

Newspapers and editorials

- The Dallas Morning News
- Fort Worth Star-Telegram
Deborah Peoples

Federal officials

- Keisha Lance Bottoms, mayor of Atlanta
- Latoya Cantrell, mayor of New Orleans
- Julian Castro, former secretary of Housing and Urban Development
- Jaime Harrison, chairman of the Democratic National Committee
- Eddie Bernice Johnson, U.S. representative for Texas's 30th congressional district
- Beto O'Rourke, former U.S. representative for Texas's 16th congressional district (2013–2019)
- Marc Veasey, U.S. representative for Texas's 33rd congressional district

County officials

- Roy Brooks, Tarrant County commissioner
- Michael Campbell, Tarrant County constable
- Sandra Lee, Tarrant County constable
- Lupe Valdez, former Dallas County sheriff and nominee for governor of Texas in 2018

State officials

- Nicole Collier, state representative, District 95
- Ramon Romero Jr., state representative, District 90
- Chris Turner, state representative, District 101
- Royce West, state senator, District 23

Organizations

- AFL–CIO of Tarrant County
- The Collective PAC
- EMILY's List
- North Side Community
- Tarrant County Central Labor Council
- Tarrant County DP AAPI committee
- Tarrant County Latinx Voter Outreach committee
- Texas Democratic Party
- Working Families Party

Individuals

- Robert Hughes, basketball coach

=== Results ===
2021 Fort Worth mayoral runoff election results
Party	Candidate	Votes	%
Nonpartisan	Mattie Parker	47,283	53.55
Nonpartisan	Deborah Peoples	41,012	46.55
Total ballots		88,295	100.00
