= Louisiana Department of Revenue =

US state agency

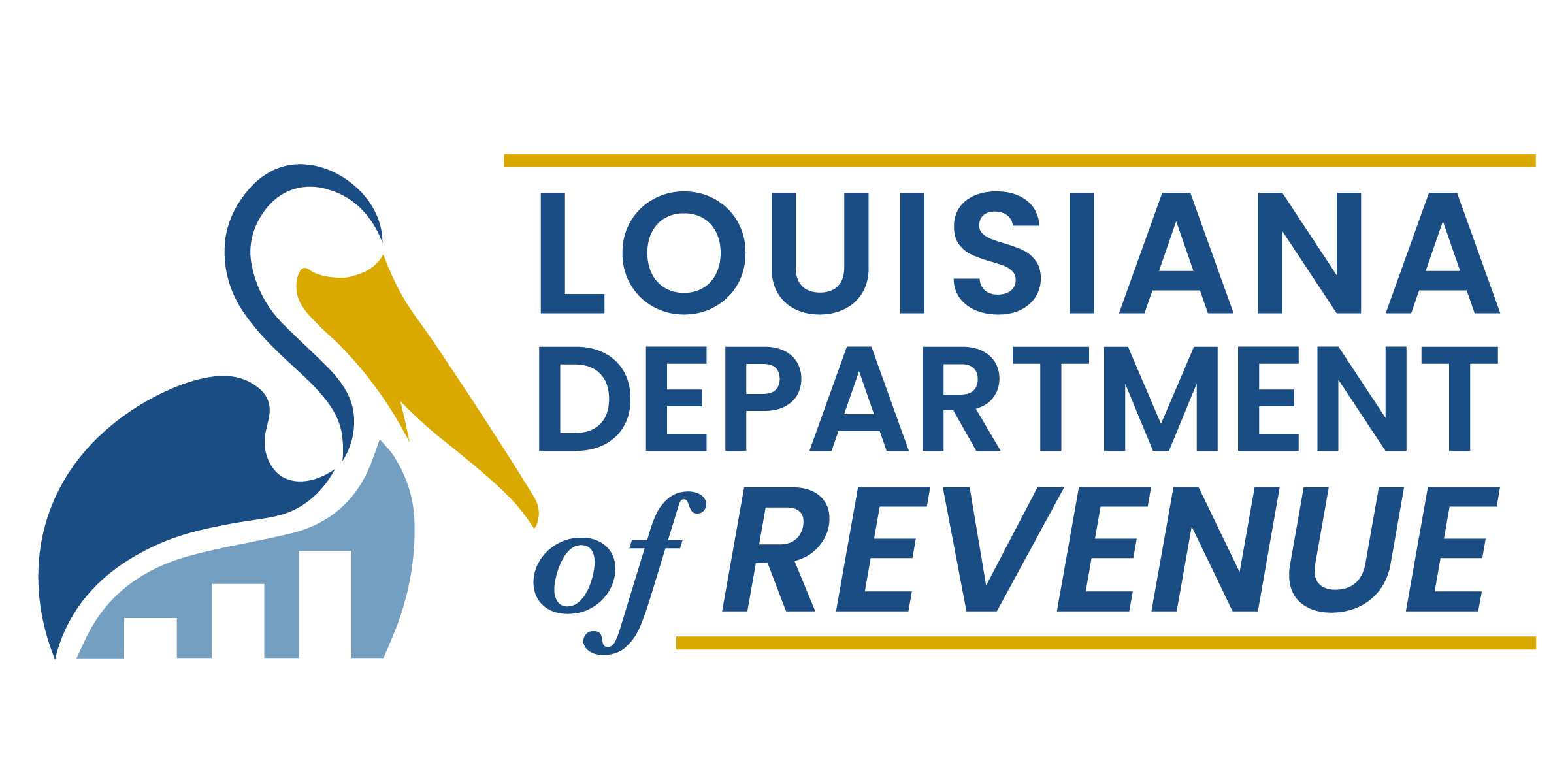
- Official logo of the Department of Revenue

Agency overview
- Formed: 1936
- Headquarters: 617 North 3rd Street, Baton Rouge, Louisiana
- Employees: 850
- Agency executive: Richard Nelson, Secretary
- Website: revenue.louisiana.gov

The Louisiana Department of Revenue (LDR) is a cabinet-level state agency of Louisiana responsible for the administration, collection, and enforcement of the state's tax laws and regulations, as well as the recovery of certain state debts. Headquartered in Baton Rouge, the department serves to ensure taxpayer compliance to support the financial stability and public services of the government of Louisiana.

The department is led by the Secretary of Revenue, who is appointed by the Governor of Louisiana and confirmed by the Louisiana State Senate. Since January 2024, Richard Nelson has served as the secretary of the Louisiana Department of Revenue.

== History ==
The Louisiana Department of Revenue was established by an amendment to the Constitution of Louisiana in 1936. The Secretary of Revenue is a statutory member of the Louisiana Tax Commission, along with the Speaker of the Louisiana House of Representatives and the President of the Louisiana State Senate.

In 2020, the department opened a regional office in Lafayette, Louisiana, to serve Acadiana residents. In 2023, the department opened a regional office in Shreveport, Louisiana.

In January 2024, Governor Jeff Landry appointed former State Representative Richard Nelson as Secretary of Revenue.

== List of secretaries ==
List of secretaries of the Louisiana Department of Revenue:

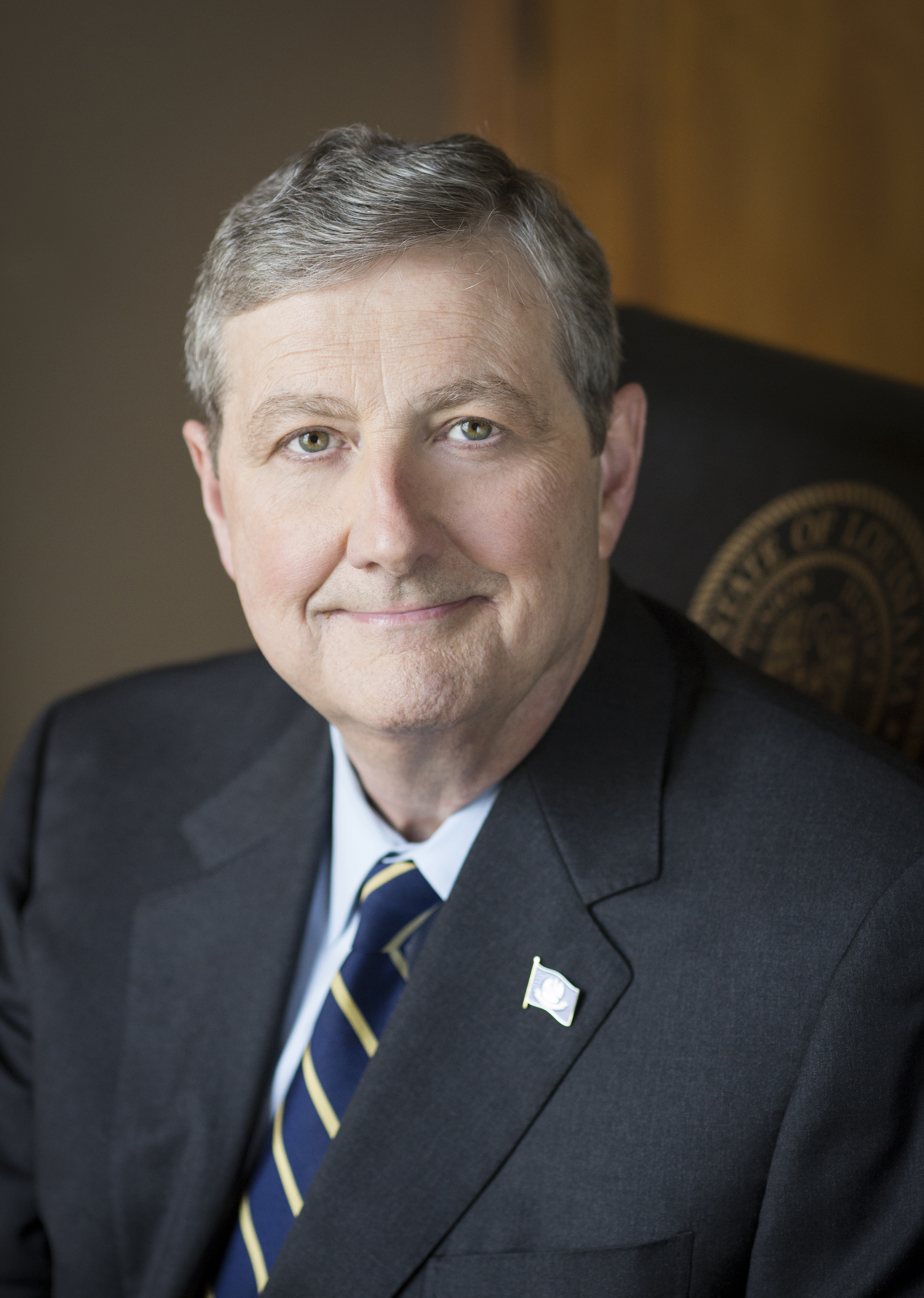
U.S. Senator John Kennedy served as Secretary of Revenue from 1996 to 1999.

- John Kennedy (1996–1999)
- Kimberly Lewis Robinson (2016–2022)
- Kevin J. Richard (2022–2024)
- Richard Nelson (2024–present)

== See also ==
- Louisiana Department of Health
- Louisiana Department of Education
- Louisiana Department of Culture, Recreation & Tourism
