= 2023 Louisiana gubernatorial election =

- October 14, 2023
- Turnout: 36.3% ▼
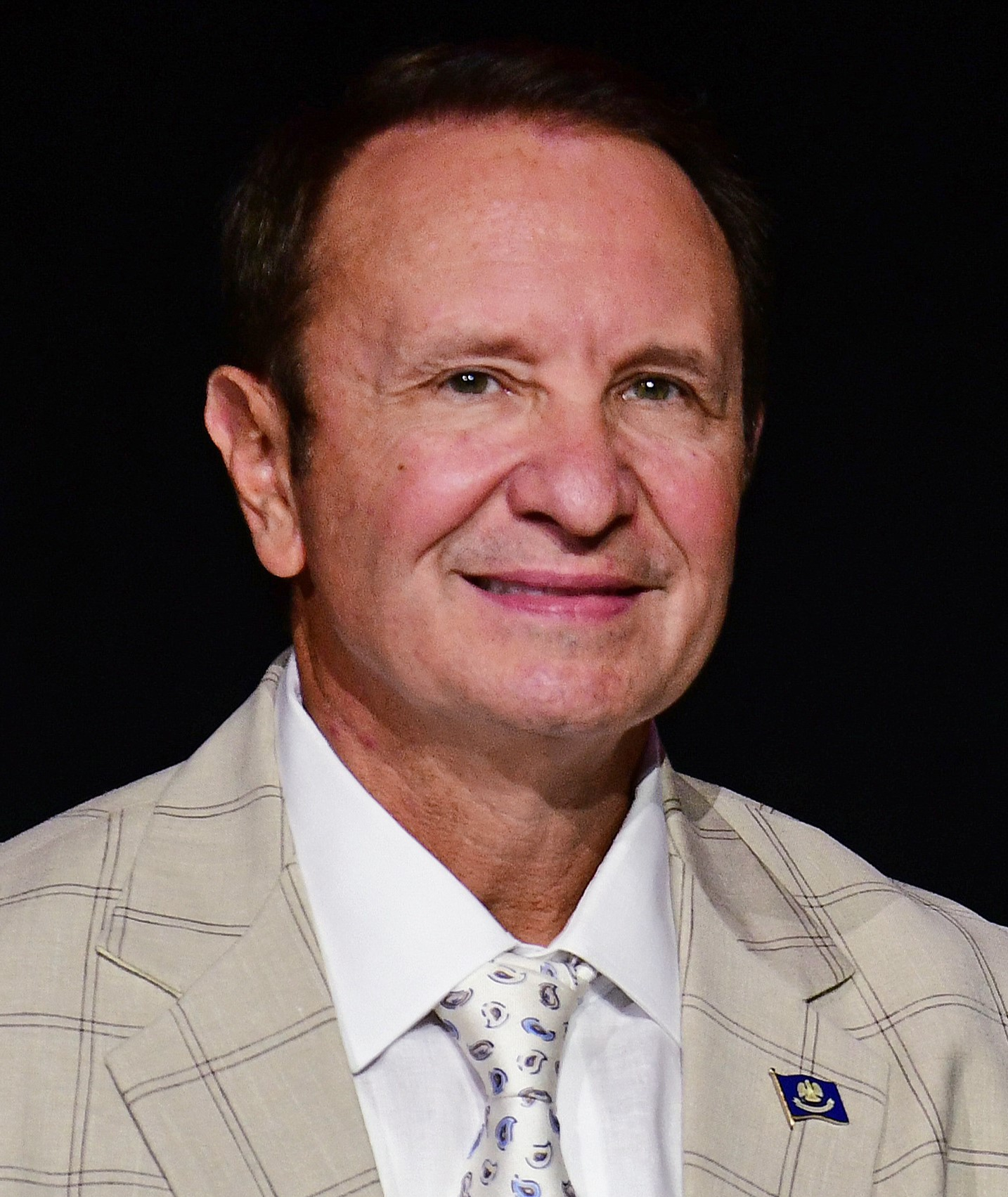

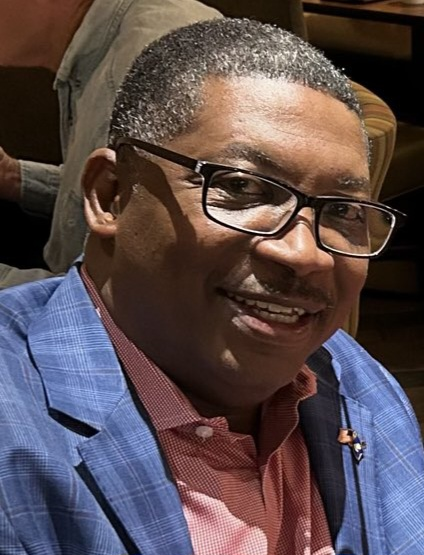

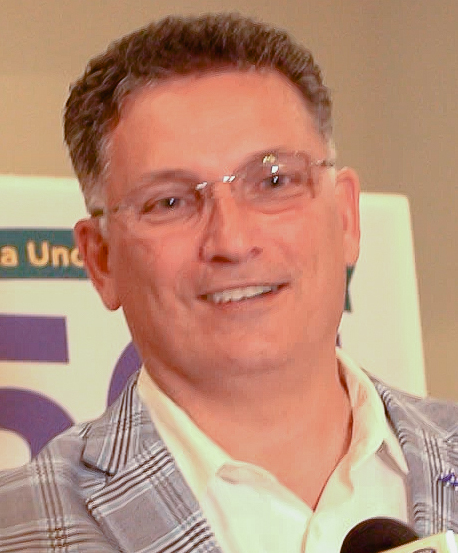
Candidate	Jeff Landry	Shawn Wilson
Party	Republican	Democratic
Popular vote	547,827	275,525
Percentage	51.56%	25.93%
Candidate	Stephen Waguespack	John Schroder
Party	Republican	Republican
Popular vote	62,287	56,654
Percentage	5.86%	5.33%
- Landry: 30–40% 40–50% 50–60% 60–70% 70–80% 80–90% Wilson: 40–50% 50–60% 70–80% Landry: 30–40% 40–50% 50–60% 60–70% 70–80% 80–90% Wilson: 40–50% 50–60% 70–80% Landry: 20–30% 30–40% 40–50% 50–60% 60–70% 70–80% 80–90% >90% Wilson: 20–30% 30–40% 40–50% 50–60% 60–70% 70–80% 80–90% >90% Waguespack: 30–40% 40–50% 50–60% >90% Schroder: 30–40% 60–70% >90% Lundy: 30–40% 40–50% Cole: 30–40% 60–70% >90% Tie: 20–30% 30–40% 40–50% 50% No votes
Governor before election
John Bel Edwards
Democratic
Elected Governor
Jeff Landry
Republican

The 2023 Louisiana gubernatorial election was held on October 14, 2023, to elect the governor of Louisiana. Incumbent Governor John Bel Edwards was term-limited and could not seek re-election to a third consecutive term in office. This race was one of two Democratic-held governorships up for election in 2023 in a state that voted for Donald Trump in 2020.

Under Louisiana's two-round system, all candidates appear on the same ballot, regardless of party, and voters may vote for any candidate regardless of that person's party affiliation. If no candidate had received an absolute majority of the vote during the primary election on October 14, 2023, a runoff election would have been held on November 18, 2023, between the top two candidates in the primary.

State Attorney General Jeff Landry won with over 51% of the vote in the primary. This was the first time a candidate won a Louisiana gubernatorial election without a runoff since fellow Republican Bobby Jindal was re-elected in 2011. Landry easily prevailed over several Republican opponents, including former state chamber of commerce CEO Stephen Waguespack and State Treasurer John Schroder. Former state Transportation Secretary Shawn Wilson was the leading Democratic candidate. All the Republican candidates collectively won 65.52% of the vote, including a candidate who got 0.34% of the vote as he dropped out of the race but remained on the ballot. All the Democrats collectively won 28.53% of the vote, and all the Independents collectively won 5.95% of the vote. This was the only governorship to flip parties in the 2023 elections.

== Background ==
Louisiana, like much of the Deep South, is a socially conservative "Bible Belt" state. Democrats were the favored party at all levels of government as recently as the 1990s; however, the Republican Party has since rapidly gained ground, first at the federal level and gradually at the state and local level as well. Today, the state is strongly Republican-leaning and, at the time of the election, Republicans held both of the state's U.S. Senate seats, all but one of its U.S. House seats, majorities in both of its state legislative chambers, and every statewide executive office except the governorship, which they would ultimately win.

John Bel Edwards, a populist conservative Democrat, was able to win two terms as governor and overcome the state's partisan lean by diverging from the national party on certain policy matters, such as abortion, while also appealing to Louisiana's contemporary Democratic voting base. However, as Edwards was term-limited going into the election, most analysts expected the governorship to flip back to the Republican Party in 2023, primarily due to the lack of Democratic candidates with Edwards' crossover appeal.

This proved to be true as Republican Jeff Landry won the election in a landslide, with over 51% of the vote. Republicans collectively secured about 66% of the vote while Democrats won only about 29%, an all time low, with about 26% going to their top vote getter and runner up Shawn Wilson.

== Democratic candidates ==
=== Declared ===
- Danny Cole, Pentecostal pastor
- Shawn Wilson, former secretary of the Louisiana Department of Transportation and Development

=== Declined ===
- Katie Bernhardt, chair of the Louisiana Democratic Party (endorsed Wilson)
- Sharon Weston Broome, mayor of Baton Rouge (endorsed Wilson)
- Gary Chambers, community organizer, runner-up for U.S. Senate in 2022, and candidate for Louisiana's 2nd congressional district in 2021 (endorsed Wilson)
- Hillar Moore, East Baton Rouge Parish district attorney
- Cedric Richmond, former director of the Office of Public Engagement, former Senior Advisor to the President, and former U.S. representative from Louisiana's 2nd congressional district
- Jason Williams, Orleans Parish district attorney

== Republican candidates ==
=== Declared ===
- Patrick "Dat" Barthel, engineer and Democratic candidate for governor in 2003
- Xavier Ellis, teacher
- Sharon Hewitt, majority leader of the Louisiana Senate from the 1st district
- Xan John, businessman and independent candidate for U.S. Senate in 2020 and 2022
- Jeff Landry, Louisiana attorney general
- John Schroder, Louisiana state treasurer
- Stephen Waguespack, former president and CEO of the Louisiana Association of Business and Industry and former chief of staff to then-governor Bobby Jindal

=== Withdrawn ===
- Richard Nelson, state representative from the 89th district (endorsed Landry)

=== Declined ===
- Bill Cassidy, U.S. senator
- Garret Graves, U.S. representative from Louisiana's 6th congressional district (endorsed Waguespack)
- John Kennedy, U.S. senator
- Billy Nungesser, lieutenant governor of Louisiana (ran for re-election)
- Clay Schexnayder, speaker of the Louisiana House of Representatives (ran for Secretary of State)
- Mike Strain, commissioner of the Louisiana Department of Agriculture and Forestry (ran for re-election)
- Rick Ward III, former state senator from the 17th district

== Independent candidates ==
=== Declared ===
- Benjamin Barnes
- Keitron Gagnon
- Jeffery Istre, oilfield worker and U.S. Army veteran
- Hunter Lundy, attorney and Democratic candidate for Louisiana's 7th congressional district in 1996
- Frank Scurlock, retired businessman and Democratic candidate for mayor of New Orleans in 2017

== Jungle primary ==
=== Campaign ===
The Louisiana Republican Party endorsed Attorney General Jeff Landry's campaign on November 7, 2022, a year before the election. The party had had a full-body meeting scheduled for October 29, but it was canceled, and instead the endorsement was voted on in an exclusive meeting held over Zoom. Landry and Eddie Rispone, a member of the Republican State Central Committee who supported him, had pushed the party to make an early endorsement, arguing that the Republicans' best chance of flipping the governorship was to unite around one candidate well in advance of the election. This move was heavily criticized by other Republicans who had expressed interest in running for governor. Lieutenant Governor Billy Nungesser said the party's endorsement process "looks more like communist China than the Louisiana we know and love," State Treasurer John Schroder claimed it was driven by "money and inside party politics," and Louisiana Senate Majority Leader Sharon Hewitt proclaimed "the citizens of Louisiana do not need backroom deals and political insiders telling them who should be our next governor." Michael DiResto, a member of the Republican State Central Committee, believed "the idea that a small cabal would preempt the democratic process literally under the cover of darkness and in a smoke-filled Zoom goes against the foundational values of our party." In response, Louisiana Republican Party chair Louis Gurvich said "others who are crying over this endorsement are just upset because they didn't have the support within our party to win the endorsement for themselves."

=== Endorsements ===
Jeff Landry (R)

Federal officials

- Donald Trump, 45th president of the United States (2017–2021)

U.S. senators

- Bill Cassidy, U.S. senator from Louisiana (2015–present)

U.S. representatives

- Ralph Abraham, LA-5 (2015–2021) and candidate for governor in 2019
- Clay Higgins, LA-3 (2017–present)
- Mike Johnson, LA-4 (2017–present)
- Steve Scalise, House majority leader (2023–present) from LA-1 (2008–present)

State legislators

- Richard Nelson, state representative from the 89th district (2020–present)

Individuals

- Joseph C. Canizaro, commercial real estate developer
- Tracy Lawrence, country singer
- Eddie Rispone, member of the Louisiana Republican State Central Committee and runner-up for governor in 2019
- Donald Trump Jr., businessman and son of former president Donald Trump

Organizations

- Club for Growth
- Gun Owners of America
- Louisiana Sheriffs' Association
- National Rifle Association Political Victory Fund
- Oil & Gas Workers Association

Political parties

- Louisiana Republican Party
Shawn Wilson (D)

Federal officials

- Cedric Richmond, director of the Office of Public Engagement (2021–2022)

U.S. senators

- Mary Landrieu, U.S. senator from Louisiana (1997–2015)

U.S. representatives

- Troy Carter, LA-2 (2021–present)
- Cleo Fields, LA-4 (1993–1997), candidate for governor in 1995, state senator from the 14th district (2020–present)

Statewide officials

- John Bel Edwards, governor of Louisiana (2016–present)
- Davante Lewis, Louisiana Public Service Commissioner from the 3rd district (2022–present)

State legislators

- Gerald Boudreaux, state senator from the 24th district (2016–present)
- Jay Luneau, state senator from the 29th district (2016–present)
- Vincent Pierre, state representative from the 44th district (2012–present)

Local officials

- Sharon Weston Broome, mayor-president of Baton Rouge (2017–present)
- Helena Moreno, vice president of the New Orleans City Council (2023–present) from the at-large district (2018–present)

Organizations

- Louisiana AFL-CIO
- Moms Demand Action
- New Orleans Independent Women's Organization

Individuals

- Katie Bernhardt, chair of the Louisiana Democratic Party (2020–present)
- Gary Chambers, community organizer

Political parties

- Louisiana Democratic Party

Newspapers and other media

- Gambit
Stephen Waguespack (R)

U.S. representatives

- Garret Graves, LA-6 (2015–present)

Newspapers and other media

- The Times-Picayune/The New Orleans Advocate

=== Predictions ===
Source	Ranking	As of
The Cook Political Report	Lean R (flip)	July 21, 2023
Inside Elections	Likely R (flip)	September 1, 2023
Sabato's Crystal Ball	Likely R (flip)	July 13, 2023
Elections Daily	Safe R (flip)	July 12, 2023

=== Polling ===
Poll source	Date(s) administered	Sample size (Note: Key: A – all adults RV – registered voters LV – likely voters V – unclear)	Margin of error	Hewitt (R)	Istre (I)	Landry (R)	Lundy (I)	Nelson (R)	Schroder (R)	Waguespack (R)	Wilson (D)	Other	Undecided
Mason-Dixon Polling & Strategy (Note: Poll sponsored by Gray Television)	September 12–15, 2023	625 (RV)	± 4.0%	2%	0%	40%	4%	1%	3%	9%	24%	2% (Note: Oscar Dantzler & Patrick Henry Barthel with 1%; Benjamin Barnes, Daniel Cole, Xavier Ellis, Keitron Gagnon, Xan John & Frank Scurlock with 0%)	15%
The Trafalgar Group (R) (Note: Poll commissioned by LA Integrity PAC)	September 11–15, 2023	1,062 (LV)	± 2.9%	4.1%	–	37.7%	6.3%	1.2%	6.5%	6.7%	22.6%	–	14.9%
Faucheux Strategies (Note: Poll commissioned by WWL-TV, WBRZ-TV, KTBS-TV, KATC-TV, The Times-Picayune/The New Orleans Advocate, Urban League of Louisiana and Public Affairs Research Council)	August 14–19, 2023	800 (LV)	± 3.46%	3%	–	36%	7%	2%	4%	6%	26%	2%	14%
Emerson College	August 13–14, 2023	982 (LV)	± 3.1%	5%	–	40%	–	–	–	5%	22%	10 (Note: No other candidate received more than 5%)	18%
BDPC (Note: Poll sponsored by the conservative group Citizens for a New Louisiana)	July 6–10, 2023	600 (V)	± 4.0%	4%	–	30%	5%	1%	6%	5%	28%	–	23%
Kaplan Strategies	June 30 – July 2, 2023	1,077 (LV)	± 3.0%	5%	–	30%	5%	2%	6%	6%	22%	–	24%
Remington Research (R) (Note: Poll sponsored by Reboot Louisiana, a super PAC supporting Waguespack)	June 22–25, 2023	896 (LV)	?	3%	–	25%	4%	0%	7%	16%	27%	–	18%
WPA Intelligence (R) (Note: Poll sponsored by Club for Growth, which has endorsed Landry)	June 15–17, 2023	500 (LV)	± 2.45%	2%	<1%	35%	4%	<1%	3%	6%	27%	2%	18%
The Kitchens Group (D) (Note: Poll sponsored by Vantage Data House)	June 12–15, 2023	1,600 (LV)	± 2.45%	≥6%	–	31%	4%	–	≥6%	≥6%	21%	7% (Note: "Someone else" with 7%)	25%
WPA Intelligence (R)	April 30 – May 2, 2023	500 (LV)	± 2.45%	2%	1%	32%	2%	1%	6%	2%	18%	4%	32%
WPA Intelligence (R)	April 11–13, 2023	500 (LV)	± 4.4%	3%	–	36%	3%	1%	6%	2%	18%	1% (Note: "Someone else" with 1%)	29%
WPA Intelligence (R) (Note: Poll conducted for Lieutenant Governor Billy Nungesser)	Before April 18, 2023	?	?	–	–	35%	–	–	–	–	25%	17% (Note: No other candidate received more than 3%)	23%
JMC Analytics (Note: Poll conducted for Attorney General candidate John Belton)	March 6–8, 2023	600 (LV)	± 4.0%	2%	–	28%	3%	–	3%	–	29%	–	22%
BDPC (Note: Poll conducted for Billy Nungesser)	December 7–13, 2022	630 (LV)	± 4.0%	3%	–	22%	2%	–	2%	–	23%	23% (Note: Billy Nungesser (R) with 23%)	24%
Torchlight Strategies (Note: Poll conducted for John Kennedy)	December 6–9, 2022	861 (LV)	± 3.3%	–	–	14%	–	–	–	–	22%	42% (Note: John Kennedy (R) with 42%)	20%
Torchlight Strategies	November 9–12, 2022	800 (LV)	± 3.5%	<1%	–	13%	2%	–	1%	–	18%	40% (Note: John Kennedy (R) with 22%; Billy Nungesser (R) with 7%; Bill Cassidy (R) with 6%; Garret Graves (R) with 5%)	26%
JMC Analytics (R)	March 21–23, 2022	600 (LV)	± 4.0%	2%	–	11%	–	–	1%	–	–	46% (Note: John Kennedy (R) with 22%; Sharon Weston Broome (D) with 14%; Bill Cassidy (R) with 10%; Billy Nungesser (R) with 7%; Gary Smith Jr. (D) with 4%)	29%

Hypothetical polling

Jeff Landry vs. Sharon Hewitt

Poll source	Date(s) administered	Sample size	Margin of error	Jeff Landry (R)	Sharon Hewitt (R)	Undecided
Mason-Dixon Polling & Strategy	September 12–15, 2023	625 (RV)	± 4.0%	53%	23%	24%

Jeff Landry vs. Hunter Lundy

Poll source	Date(s) administered	Sample size	Margin of error	Jeff Landry (R)	Hunter Lundy (I)	Undecided
Mason-Dixon Polling & Strategy	September 12–15, 2023	625 (RV)	± 4.0%	56%	30%	14%

Jeff Landry vs. John Schroder

Poll source	Date(s) administered	Sample size	Margin of error	Jeff Landry (R)	John Schroder (R)	Undecided
Mason-Dixon Polling & Strategy	September 12–15, 2023	625 (RV)	± 4.0%	51%	23%	26%

Jeff Landry vs. Stephen Waguespack

Poll source	Date(s) administered	Sample size	Margin of error	Jeff Landry (R)	Stephen Waguespack (R)	Undecided
Mason-Dixon Polling & Strategy	September 12–15, 2023	625 (RV)	± 4.0%	52%	27%	21%

Jeff Landry vs. Shawn Wilson

Poll source	Date(s) administered	Sample size	Margin of error	Jeff Landry (R)	Shawn Wilson (D)	Undecided
Mason-Dixon Polling & Strategy	September 12–15, 2023	625 (RV)	± 4.0%	52%	39%	9%
Faucheux Strategies	August 14–19, 2023	800 (LV)	± 3.46%	54%	36%	10%
BDPC	July 6–10, 2023	600 (V)	± 4.0%	45%	40%	16%

John Kennedy vs. Jeff Landry

Poll source	Date(s) administered	Sample size	Margin of error	John Kennedy (R)	Jeff Landry (R)	Undecided
Torchlight Strategies	December 6–9, 2022	861 (LV)	± 3.3%	46%	21%	27%

John Kennedy vs. Shawn Wilson

Poll source	Date(s) administered	Sample size	Margin of error	John Kennedy (R)	Shawn Wilson (D)	Undecided
Torchlight Strategies	December 6–9, 2022	861 (LV)	± 3.3%	58%	27%	14%
Torchlight Strategies	November 9–12, 2022	800 (LV)	± 3.5%	58%	32%	12%

Generic Democrat vs. generic Republican

Poll source	Date(s) administered	Sample size	Margin of error	Generic Democrat	Generic Republican	Undecided
JMC Analytics (R)	March 21–23, 2022	600 (LV)	± 4.0%	33%	50%	17%

=== Results ===
Turnout map by parish 25–30% 30–35% 35–40% 40–45% 45–50% 50–60%

2023 Louisiana gubernatorial election
Party	Candidate	Votes	%
Republican	Jeff Landry	547,827	51.56%
Democratic	Shawn Wilson	275,525	25.93%
Republican	Stephen Waguespack	62,287	5.86%
Republican	John Schroder	56,654	5.33%
Independent	Hunter Lundy	52,165	4.91%
Democratic	Danny Cole	27,662	2.60%
Republican	Sharon Hewitt	18,468	1.74%
Independent	Benjamin Barnes	5,190	0.49%
Republican	Dat Barthel	4,426	0.42%
Republican	Richard Nelson (withdrawn)	3,605	0.34%
Independent	Jeffery Istre	3,400	0.32%
Republican	Xavier Ellis	1,734	0.16%
No party preference	Keitron Gagnon	1,260	0.12%
Republican	Xan John	1,164	0.11%
Independent	Frank Scurlock	1,131	0.11%
Total votes		1,062,498	100.00%
Republican gain from Democratic			

==== By parish ====
Parish	Jeff Landry Republican		Shawn Wilson Democratic		Stephen Waguespack Republican		John Schroder Republican		Various candidates Other parties		Margin		Total
Parish	#	%	#	%	#	%	#	%	#	%	#	%	Total
Acadia	11,685	78.28%	1,283	8.59%	533	3.57%	178	1.19%	1,249	8.37%	10,402	69.68%	14,928
Allen	3,280	73.79%	427	9.61%	133	2.99%	42	0.94%	563	12.67%	2,853	64.18%	4,445
Ascension	14,676	49.17%	7,045	23.61%	3,853	12.91%	1,432	4.80%	2,839	9.51%	7,631	25.57%	29,845
Assumption	3,454	53.15%	1,633	25.13%	351	5.40%	454	6.99%	607	9.34%	1,821	28.02%	6,499
Avoyelles	6,763	68.37%	1,846	18.66%	293	2.96%	78	0.79%	912	9.22%	4,917	49.71%	9,892
Beauregard	5,323	70.79%	546	7.26%	320	4.26%	111	1.48%	1,219	16.21%	4,777	63.53%	7,519
Bienville	2,193	53.91%	1,049	25.79%	78	1.92%	45	1.11%	703	17.28%	1,144	28.12%	4,068
Bossier	16,498	70.91%	3,310	14.23%	856	3.68%	321	1.38%	2,281	9.80%	13,188	56.68%	23,266
Caddo	21,979	47.56%	16,177	35.01%	2,091	4.52%	574	1.24%	5,390	11.66%	5,802	12.56%	46,211
Calcasieu	22,021	52.70%	7,820	18.71%	2,075	4.97%	418	1.00%	9,451	22.62%	14,201	33.99%	41,785
Caldwell	2,287	73.35%	215	6.90%	87	2.79%	131	4.20%	398	12.76%	2,072	66.45%	3,118
Cameron	1,993	74.59%	63	2.36%	99	3.71%	20	0.75%	497	18.60%	1,894	70.88% (Note: Compares margin over Waguespack.)	2,672
Catahoula	2,219	68.91%	438	13.60%	88	2.73%	85	2.64%	390	12.11%	1,781	55.31%	3,220
Claiborne	2,554	59.18%	923	21.39%	104	2.41%	46	1.07%	689	15.96%	1,631	37.79%	4,316
Concordia	2,161	50.12%	1,200	27.83%	128	2.97%	147	3.41%	676	15.68%	961	22.29%	4,312
De Soto	5,193	61.38%	1,811	21.41%	199	2.35%	209	2.47%	1,048	12.39%	3,382	39.98%	8,460
East Baton Rouge	31,308	31.41%	42,563	42.70%	13,131	13.17%	3,423	3.43%	9,262	9.29%	−11,255	−11.29%	99,687
East Carroll	537	34.78%	647	41.90%	69	4.47%	35	2.27%	256	16.58%	−110	−7.12%	1,544
East Feliciana	3,143	48.49%	2,211	34.11%	259	4.00%	191	2.95%	678	10.46%	932	14.38%	6,482
Evangeline	5,624	67.53%	1,574	18.90%	163	1.96%	81	0.97%	886	10.64%	4,050	48.63%	8,328
Franklin	3,780	68.83%	793	14.44%	162	2.95%	222	4.04%	535	9.74%	2,987	54.39%	5,492
Grant	4,405	80.90%	331	6.08%	166	3.05%	45	0.83%	498	9.15%	4,074	74.82%	5,445
Iberia	11,980	70.24%	3,322	19.48%	379	2.22%	107	0.63%	1,269	7.44%	8,658	50.76%	17,057
Iberville	4,603	41.14%	3,938	35.20%	621	5.55%	692	6.18%	1,335	11.93%	665	5.94%	11,189
Jackson	3,184	69.13%	576	12.51%	108	2.34%	135	2.93%	603	13.09%	2,608	56.62%	4,606
Jefferson	35,015	40.05%	23,067	26.39%	6,730	7.70%	12,778	14.62%	9,832	11.25%	11,948	13.67%	87,422
Jefferson Davis	5,849	71.40%	731	8.92%	273	3.33%	54	0.66%	1,285	15.69%	5,118	62.48%	8,192
Lafayette	35,454	61.26%	13,363	23.09%	2,850	4.92%	788	1.36%	5,415	9.36%	22,091	38.17%	57,870
Lafourche	14,029	66.95%	2,098	10.01%	1,174	5.60%	1,432	6.83%	2,221	10.60%	11,931	56.94%	20,954
LaSalle	3,891	78.13%	189	3.80%	155	3.11%	146	2.93%	599	12.03%	3,702	74.34%	4,980
Lincoln	4,569	56.46%	1,824	22.54%	483	5.97%	235	2.90%	982	12.13%	2,745	33.92%	8,093
Livingston	24,240	68.20%	2,663	7.49%	2,912	8.19%	2,362	6.65%	3,366	9.47%	21,328	60.01%	35,543
Madison	1,269	43.99%	802	27.80%	126	4.37%	94	3.26%	594	20.59%	467	16.19%	2,885
Morehouse	3,210	57.10%	1,545	27.48%	153	2.72%	136	2.42%	578	10.28%	1,665	29.62%	5,622
Natchitoches	5,193	56.62%	2,288	24.95%	259	2.82%	173	1.89%	1,259	13.73%	2,905	31.67%	9,172
Orleans	6,943	9.74%	50,352	70.61%	5,056	7.09%	2,721	3.82%	6,240	8.75%	−43,409	−60.87%	71,312
Ouachita	17,754	58.58%	6,936	22.89%	1,477	4.87%	1,027	3.39%	3,114	10.27%	10,818	35.69%	30,308
Plaquemines	3,172	54.34%	970	16.62%	305	5.23%	632	10.83%	758	12.99%	2,202	37.72%	5,837
Pointe Coupee	4,078	53.66%	1,890	24.87%	519	6.83%	280	3.68%	833	10.96%	2,188	28.79%	7,600
Rapides	19,857	64.20%	6,135	19.83%	1,500	4.85%	336	1.09%	3,104	10.03%	13,722	44.36%	30,932
Red River	1,338	62.49%	510	23.82%	48	2.24%	15	0.70%	230	10.74%	828	38.67%	2,141
Richland	3,510	66.74%	922	17.53%	106	2.02%	122	2.32%	599	11.39%	2,588	49.21%	5,259
Sabine	5,095	77.99%	441	6.75%	197	3.02%	121	1.85%	679	10.39%	4,654	71.24%	6,533
St. Bernard	5,305	51.57%	1,714	16.66%	372	3.62%	1,139	11.07%	1,756	17.07%	3,591	34.91%	10,286
St. Charles	7,159	50.15%	3,144	22.02%	732	5.13%	1,501	10.51%	1,740	12.19%	4,015	28.12%	14,276
St. Helena	1,807	40.86%	1,639	37.06%	90	2.04%	180	4.07%	706	15.97%	168	3.80%	4,422
St. James	3,405	40.30%	2,970	35.15%	542	6.41%	427	5.05%	1,105	13.08%	435	5.15%	8,449
St. John the Baptist	3,025	29.37%	4,707	45.70%	274	2.66%	530	5.15%	1,763	17.12%	−1,682	−16.33%	10,299
St. Landry	11,449	57.71%	5,946	29.97%	437	2.20%	128	0.65%	1,880	9.48%	5,503	27.74%	19,840
St. Martin	11,053	72.55%	2,792	18.33%	295	1.94%	115	0.75%	981	6.44%	8,261	54.22%	15,236
St. Mary	7,092	60.46%	2,830	24.12%	434	3.70%	219	1.87%	1,156	9.85%	4,262	36.33%	11,731
St. Tammany	32,236	47.54%	10,057	14.83%	3,599	5.31%	12,364	18.23%	9,548	14.08%	19,872	29.31%	67,804
Tangipahoa	15,982	54.20%	5,761	19.54%	1,213	4.11%	3,136	10.64%	3,394	11.51%	10,221	34.66%	29,486
Tensas	773	39.34%	596	30.33%	148	7.53%	60	3.05%	388	19.75%	177	9.01%	1,965
Terrebonne	13,474	63.35%	2,845	13.38%	941	4.42%	1,532	7.20%	2,478	11.65%	10,629	49.97%	21,270
Union	4,784	71.49%	879	13.14%	191	2.85%	222	3.32%	616	9.21%	3,905	58.35%	6,692
Vermilion	12,940	78.20%	1,435	8.67%	477	2.88%	179	1.08%	1,516	9.16%	11,505	69.53%	16,547
Vernon	6,835	79.97%	704	8.24%	175	2.05%	84	0.98%	749	8.76%	6,131	71.73%	8,547
Washington	6,833	55.38%	2,503	20.29%	249	2.02%	1,250	10.13%	1,503	12.18%	4,330	35.09%	12,338
Webster	4,784	61.44%	1,695	21.77%	252	3.24%	136	1.75%	919	11.80%	3,089	39.67%	7,786
West Baton Rouge	4,921	49.98%	3,046	30.94%	583	5.92%	397	4.03%	898	9.12%	1,875	19.05%	9,845
West Carroll	1,843	76.54%	182	7.56%	76	3.16%	89	3.70%	218	9.05%	1,661	68.98%	2,408
West Feliciana	1,855	49.57%	1,075	28.73%	330	8.82%	142	3.79%	340	9.09%	780	20.84%	3,742
Winn	2,963	66.02%	538	11.99%	208	4.63%	150	3.34%	629	14.02%	2,425	54.03%	4,488
TOTALS	547,827	51.56%	275,525	25.93%	62,287	5.86%	56,654	5.33%	120,205	11.31%	272,302	25.63%	1,062,498

==== By congressional district ====
Landry won five of six congressional districts.

District	Wilson	Landry	Waguespack	Schroder	Representative
1st	16%	49%	8%	16%	Steve Scalise
2nd	60%	21%	4%	4%	Troy Carter
3rd	18%	64%	4%	1%	Clay Higgins
4th	23%	61%	3%	1%	Mike Johnson
5th	21%	60%	4%	4%	Julia Letlow
6th	23%	50%	12%	5%	Garret Graves

== Aftermath ==
In his victory speech, Governor-elect Landry stated that the "election says that our state is united", adding, "it's a wake up call and it's a message that everyone should hear loud and clear, that we the people in this state are going to expect more out of our government from here on out".

== See also ==
- 2023 Louisiana elections

== Notes ==
Partisan clients
