= 2017 Louisiana State Treasurer special election =

- October 14, 2017 and November 18, 2017
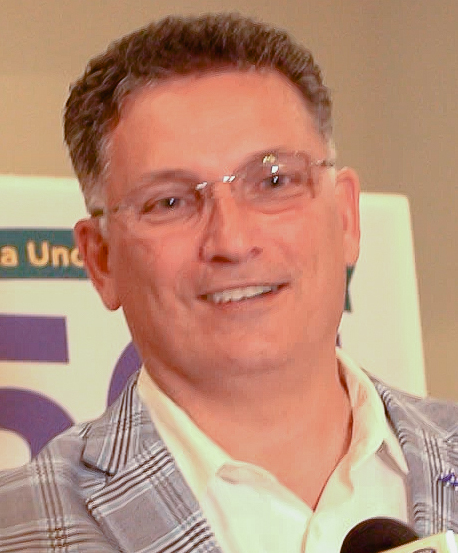

Nominee	John Schroder	Derrick Edwards
Party	Republican	Democratic
Popular vote	208,118	165,269
Percentage	55.7%	44.3%
- Schroder: 20–30% 30–40% 40–50% 50–60% 60–70% 70–80% 80–90% >90% Edwards: 20–30% 30–40% 40–50% 50–60% 60–70% 70–80% 80–90% >90% Davis: 20–30% 30–40% 40–50% 50–60% 60–70% 70–80% 80–90% >90% Riser: 20–30% 30–40% 40–50% 50–60% 60–70% 70–80% 80–90% >90% Hughes: 60–70% 70–80% 80–90% Little: 60–70% Tie: 20-30% 30–40% 40–50% No votes Schroder: 20–30% 30–40% 40–50% 50–60% 60–70% 70–80% 80–90% >90% Edwards: 20–30% 30–40% 40–50% 50–60% 60–70% 70–80% 80–90% >90% Davis: 20–30% 30–40% 40–50% 50–60% 60–70% 70–80% 80–90% >90% Riser: 20–30% 30–40% 40–50% 50–60% 60–70% 70–80% 80–90% >90% Hughes: 60–70% 70–80% 80–90% Little: 60–70% Tie: 20-30% 30–40% 40–50% No votes Schroder: 50–60% 60–70% 70–80% 80–90% >90% Edwards: 50–60% 60–70% 70–80% 80–90% >90% Tie: 50% No Data Schroder: 50–60% 60–70% 70–80% 80–90% >90% Edwards: 50–60% 60–70% 70–80% 80–90% >90% Tie: 50% No Data
State Treasurer before election
Ron Henson
Republican
Elected State Treasurer
John Schroder
Republican

The Louisiana State Treasurer special election took place on October 14, 2017, to elect the state treasurer of Louisiana, with a runoff election to be held on November 18, 2017, if necessary. Republican State Treasurer John Kennedy resigned after he was elected to the U.S. Senate in 2016. First Assistant Treasurer Ron Henson replaced Kennedy as treasurer, and served until the special election. Henson did not run in the special election.

Under Louisiana's jungle primary system, all candidates appeared on the same ballot, regardless of party and voters may vote for any candidate, regardless of their party affiliation. If no candidate receives a majority of the vote during the primary election, a runoff election will be held between the top two candidates. Louisiana is the only state that has a jungle primary system (California and Washington have a similar "top two primary" system). In the first round, Republican candidates received over 65% votes. Republican John Schroder defeated Democrat Derrick Edwards 55.7%-44.3% in the runoff.

== Candidates ==
=== Republican Party ===
==== Declared ====
- Angele Davis, businesswoman and former commissioner of the Louisiana Department of Administration
- Terry Hughes
- Neil Riser, state senator and candidate for LA-05 in 2013
- John Schroder, state representative

==== Withdrew ====
- Julie Stokes, state representative

==== Declined ====
- Ron Henson, incumbent state treasurer
- Rob Maness, retired United States Air Force colonel and candidate for U.S. Senate in 2014 and 2016

=== Democratic Party ===
==== Declared ====
- Derrick Edwards, attorney and candidate for U.S. Senate in 2016

=== Libertarian Party ===
==== Declared ====
- Joseph D. Little

== Jungle primary ==
Louisiana State Treasurer special election Jungle Primary, 2017
Party	Candidate	Votes	%
Democratic	Derrick Edwards	125,503	31.26
Republican	John Schroder	96,440	24.02
Republican	Angele Davis	86,880	21.64
Republican	Neil Riser	72,792	18.13
Republican	Terry Hughes	11,117	2.77
Libertarian	Joseph Little	8,767	2.18
Majority		29,063	7.24
Total votes		401,499	100%

== Runoff ==
Louisiana State Treasurer special election, 2017
Party	Candidate	Votes	%
Republican	John Schroder	208,118	55.74
Democratic	Derrick Edwards	165,269	44.26
Total votes		373,387	100
Republican hold			
