= 2023 Tampa mayoral election =

- March 7, 2023; Officially nonpartisan
- Turnout: 13.68%
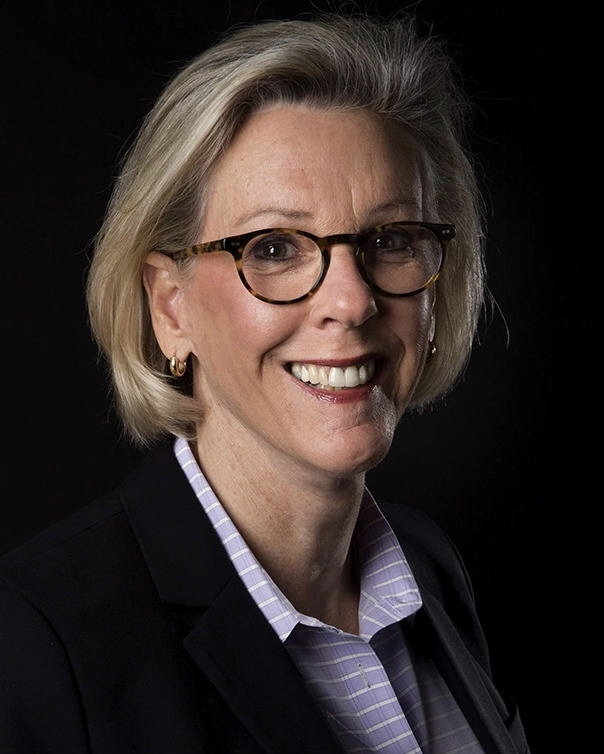

Candidate	Jane Castor	Belinda Noah (write-in)
Popular vote	22,988	2,138
Percentage	80.1%	8.5%
- Results by precinct Castor: 60–70% 70–80% 80–90% >90%
Mayor before election
Jane Castor
Elected mayor
Jane Castor

The 2023 Tampa mayoral election was held on March 7, 2023, to elect the mayor of Tampa, Florida. The election was officially nonpartisan. Incumbent mayor Jane Castor ran for re-election to a second term in office. Castor was the only candidate on the ballot, as the only other person who qualified for the race was a write-in candidate.

Castor easily won a second term, receiving more than 80% of the vote.

== Candidates ==
=== Declared ===
- Jane Castor, incumbent mayor (Party affiliation: Democratic)
- Belinda Noah, lawyer and perennial candidate (Party affiliation: Republican) (write-in)

=== Withdrew ===
- Jeff Godsell, personal chef
- Andre Hill Sr.

=== Declined ===
- Bill Carlson, city councilor (ran for re-election)

== Endorsements ==
Jane Castor

Federal officials

- Kathy Castor, U.S. Representative for Florida's 14th congressional district (2007–present) (no relation)
- Frank Sánchez, former Under Secretary of Commerce for International Trade

Statewide officials

- Betty Castor, former Education Commissioner of Florida (1987–1994) (no relation)

State legislators

- Janet Cruz, former state senator
- Arthenia Joyner, former state senate minority leader
- Ed Narain, former state representative
- Michele Rayner, state representative
- Darryl Rouson, state senator

Local officials

- Bob Buckhorn, former mayor of Tampa
- Chad Chronister, Hillsborough County sheriff (Republican)
- Harry Cohen, Hillsborough County commissioner
- Ken Hagan, Hillsborough County commissioner (Republican)
- Bob Henriquez, Hillsborough County property appraiser
- Pat Kemp, Hillsborough County commissioner
- Gwen Myers, Hillsborough County commissioner
- Tom Scott, former Tampa city councilmember
- Mariella Smith, former Hillsborough County commissioner

Organizations

- Equality Florida Action PAC
- LGBTQ Victory Fund
- LPAC

== Polling ==
Poll source	Date(s) administered	Sample size (Note: Key: A – all adults RV – registered voters LV – likely voters V – unclear)	Margin of error	Jane Castor	Generic Candidate	Undecided
Frederick Polls	January 4–10, 2023	605 (LV)	± 4.0%	61%	34%	5%

== Results ==
-->

2023 Tampa mayoral election
Candidate	Votes	%
Jane Castor (incumbent)	22,988	80.1%
Belinda Noah (write-in)	2,138	8.5%
Other write-ins	3,560	11.4%
Total votes	28,686	100.0%
