= Mattie Parker =

Mayor of Fort Worth, Texas, United States

- Parker in 2022

45th Mayor of Fort Worth
- Incumbent
- Assumed office June 15, 2021
- Preceded by: Betsy Price

Personal details
- Born: November 9, 1983 (age 42) Hico, Texas, U.S.
- Party: Republican
- Spouse: David Parker
- Education: University of Texas, Austin (BA); Texas Wesleyan University (JD)

Mattie Parker (born November 9, 1983) is an American politician, businesswoman, and attorney serving as the 45th Mayor of Fort Worth, Texas. She was elected in 2021 after serving as Chief of Staff for the Mayor and the Fort Worth City Council for five years.

After coming in second place in the first round of voting in May 2021, Parker faced off against Deborah Peoples, the Tarrant County Democratic Party chair, in the run-off election on June 5, 2021. Parker received 53.5% of the vote in the nominally non-partisan election.

In Fort Worth, mayors are elected to two-year terms. Parker succeeded Betsy Price, who served five consecutive terms as mayor, including the 2019 election. Price opted to not run for a sixth term in 2021 and endorsed Parker, her former chief of staff. Parker won the 2021 election and was re-elected in 2023 and 2025. Although Fort Worth's mayoral election is nonpartisan, Parker is affiliated with the Republican Party.

== Early life and education ==
Parker was born Mattie Jean Pearcy in Hico, Texas, about 80 miles southwest of Fort Worth. She graduated from Hico High School in 2002. She graduated in 2006 with a Bachelor of Arts in Government from the University of Texas at Austin. In 2012, Parker graduated from the Texas Wesleyan University School of Law with a Juris Doctor and, in 2013, was admitted to the State Bar of Texas. Parker was in Texas Wesleyan's final graduating class before the law school was sold and became the Texas A&M University School of Law in 2013. As a law student, she was awarded the MacLean & Boulware Endowed Law Scholarship.

== Family ==
Parker is married to David Parker, a registered lobbyist and director at Longbow Partners, and has two sons and one daughter.

== Career ==
During her junior year at the University of Texas, Parker became a press assistant in then-Texas House of Representatives Speaker Tom Craddick's office. She later became Craddick's deputy press secretary and served as his executive assistant after graduating from college. Between 2007 and 2010, Parker worked as legislative director and chief of staff to Texas Rep. Phil King, a Republican from Weatherford. While attending law school, Parker served as campaign manager for U.S. Rep Kay Granger, the first Republican woman to represent Texas in the U.S. House and Fort Worth's first female mayor. In 2012, she became Granger's district director before leaving in 2014 to work as an associate attorney at Harris, Finley & Bogle, P.C.

Parker was appointed Chief of Staff for Fort Worth's mayor and the city council starting in 2015, where she remained until April 2020. Parker then became the founding chief executive officer of Fort Worth Cradle to Career, a nonprofit organization, and the Tarrant To & Through (T3) Partnership, a coalition of organizations focused on increasing the number of Tarrant County students who obtained a postsecondary credential before entering the workforce. She left the position in July 2021 following her victory in the mayor's race, but remains on the board of directors.

== Mayor of Fort Worth ==
=== Elections ===
In January 2021, shortly after Price announced her decision not to run for another term, Parker went public with her campaign for mayor. She received endorsements from the previous mayor of Fort Worth, Betsy Price, and other prominent members of Fort Worth's business and philanthropic communities, including billionaire Sid Bass. During Parker's mayoral campaign she chose to follow the strategy of the former mayor and her prior boss, Betsy Price, to uphold a nonpartisan campaign even though she has a long history with the Republican Party.

In the general election on May 1, Parker earned 30.82% of the vote and a combined total of 55% with a few of the other Republican candidates in the race. She finished second to Deborah Peoples, the outgoing Tarrant County Democratic Party chair who had 34% of votes. Parker and Peoples competed in a June 5 runoff election, which attracted the highest early voter turnout in a Fort Worth mayor's race in at least a decade. In addition to attracting many young voters, this race grabbed the attention of many major leaders across the state, due to Fort Worth's standing as one of the few large cities in Texas with Republican representation in the mayor's office.

Prior to Election Day, Parker received an endorsement from Texas governor Greg Abbott. Parker obtained many more endorsements from political leaders and managed to obtain support from a few Democratic politicians, such as former U.S. Representative Pete Geren. Parker won the runoff with 53.5%, becoming Fort Worth's first millennial mayor and the youngest mayor among the 25 largest cities in the U.S. Parker raised and spent more than $1.98 million during the general election and runoff, a figure that surpassed any previous expenditures in Fort Worth mayoral races. She was sworn in alongside four new city council members on June 14, 2021.

=== Tenure ===
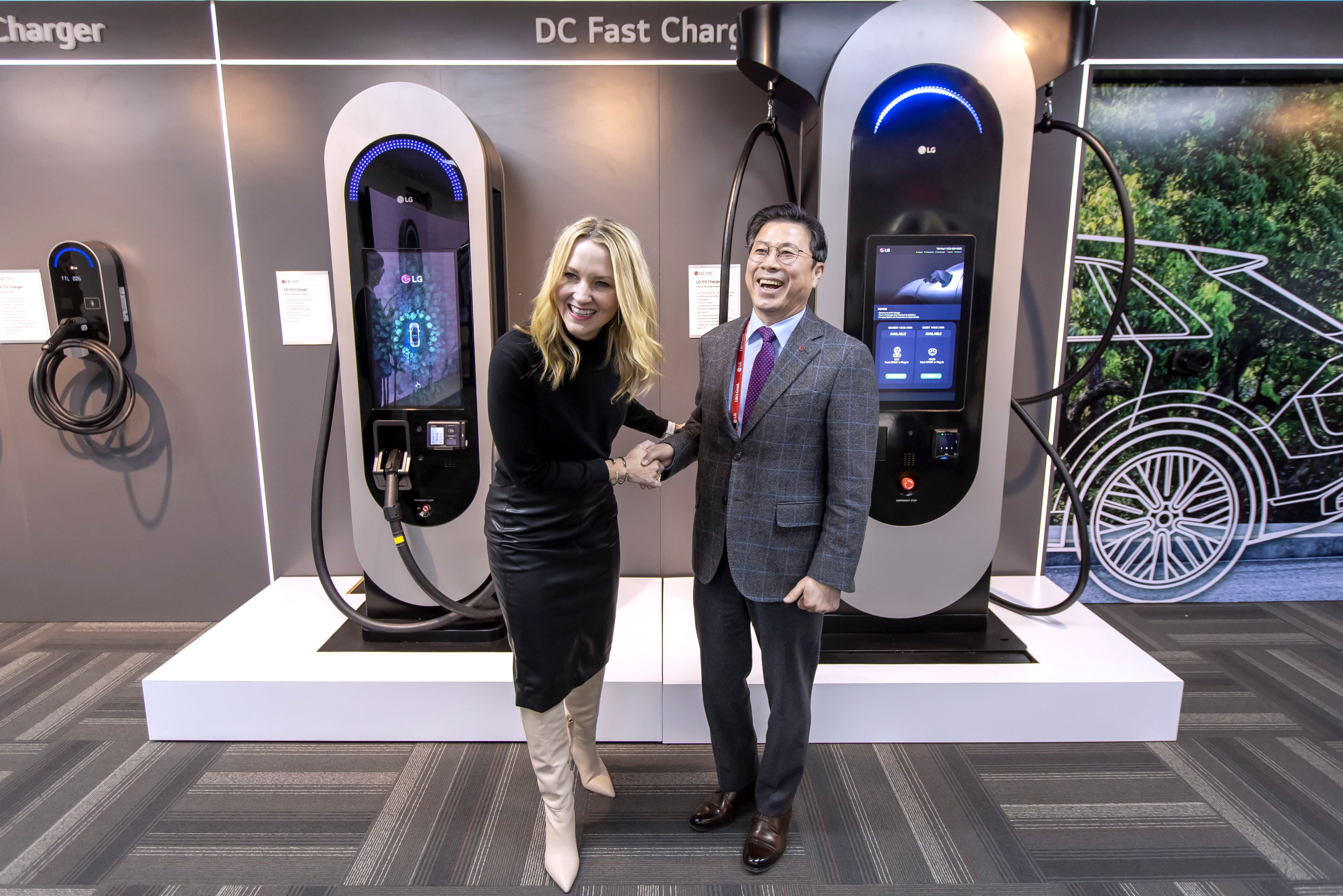
Parker at the LG charger production plant in Fort Worth, January 2024

Mattie Parker has repeatedly stated that education and school reform was a priority for her term as mayor of Fort Worth. She claims that not all students have an equitable chance at a quality education in Fort Worth. In the twelve school districts that service Fort Worth, Parker's "number one priority" is that every student has an equal chance at success. She has contributed to education nonprofits and aided in the hiring of a new Fort Worth ISD Schools Superintendent.

During her time in office, she has also secured the federal allocation of $400 million towards the Central City Flood Control Project, an initiative led by the federal government to help prevent flooding in downtown Fort Worth.

As Mayor of Fort Worth, Parker in association with the Texas Blockchain Council, helped Fort Worth to become the first city in the U.S. to mine bitcoin.

=== Controversy regarding data centers ===
The 2026 fillings with the Texas Ethics Commission shows the mayor's husband, David Parker, as a registered lobbyist for Data Center Coalition, which has been advocating for data centers in Texas. While both the mayor and her husband have strongly denied any conflict of interest, David Parker reported compensation income of at least one penny in 2026. This has come under further scrutiny as Fort Worth lacks a formal independent ethics committee. Community and ethics scholars are asking the Mayor to recuse herself from data center votes.

Political offices
Preceded by Betsy Price	Mayor of Fort Worth; 2021–present	Incumbent
