= 2023 Kansas City mayoral election =

- June 20, 2023
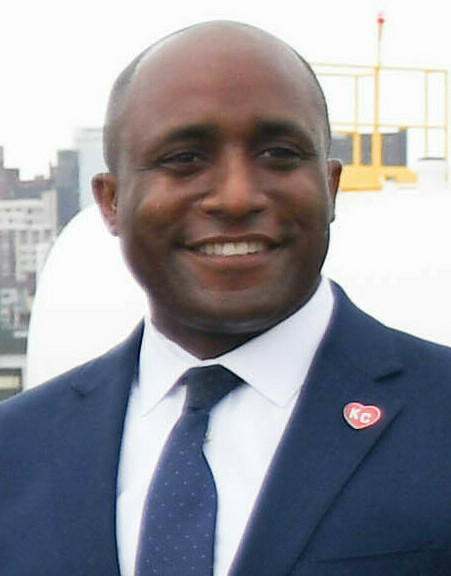

Candidate	Quinton Lucas	Clay Chastain
Party	Democratic	Republican
Popular vote	33,266	7,993
Percentage	80.62%	19.37%
Mayor before election
Quinton Lucas
Democratic
Elected mayor
Quinton Lucas
Democratic

The 2023 Kansas City mayoral election was held on June 20, 2023, to elect the mayor of Kansas City, Missouri. A primary election was held on April 4, with incumbent mayor Quinton Lucas and Clay Chastain advancing to the general. Lucas was re-elected to a second term in office in a landslide victory.

== Primary election ==
=== Candidates ===
==== Advanced to runoff ====
- Quinton Lucas, incumbent mayor (Party affiliation: Democratic)
- Clay Chastain, transit activist and perennial candidate (Party affiliation: Republican)

==== Eliminated in primary ====
- Andrew McGuire (write-in)
- Leroy Glover Jr. (write-in)

=== Results ===
2023 Kansas City mayoral primary election
Party	Candidate	Votes	%
Nonpartisan	Quinton Lucas (incumbent)	35,436	81.54%
Nonpartisan	Clay Chastain	8,308	19.11%
Write-in		72	0.01%
Total votes		43,456	100.0%

== General election ==
=== Endorsements ===
Quinton Lucas

Labor unions

- Service Employees International Union State Council of Missouri & Kansas

Organizations

- Sierra Club Missouri

=== Results ===
2023 Kansas City mayoral general election
Party	Candidate	Votes	%
Nonpartisan	Quinton Lucas (incumbent)	33,266	80.62%
Nonpartisan	Clay Chastain	7,993	19.37%
Write-in		72	0.01%
Total votes		41,259	100.0%
