= Oil & Gas Workers Association =

The Oil & Gas Workers Association (OGWA) is an American 501(c)(6) non-profit organization that generally supports Republicans and bills itself as a "grassroots, independent trade association working to save American oil and gas jobs.".

It was founded by its president Matt Coday in 2015, and incorporated in 2020. Coday has hosted events for Republican politicians and candidates and spoken on Fox News on oil and gas industry matters. Coday was a speaker at Trump's July 13, 2024 rally in Butler, Pennsylvania, where the attempted assassination occurred, and was about 20 feet away from Trump in the VIP section when shots were fired.

The organization's reported membership revenue in 2020 was $411, and $67,501.55 in 2022.
