= Christopher Kim Carver =

American politician

Kim Carver
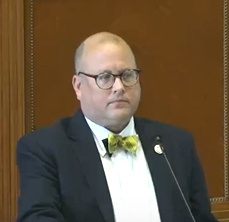

Member of the Louisiana House of Representatives from the 89th district
- Incumbent
- Assumed office January 8, 2024
- Preceded by: Richard Nelson

Personal details
- Party: Republican
- Education: Louisiana State University (BS); University of New Orleans (MBA)
- Occupation: Banker

Christopher Kim Carver is an American politician serving as a member of the Louisiana House of Representatives from the 89th district. A member of the Republican Party, Carver represents parts of St. Tammany Parish and has been in office since January 8, 2024.
