= Shawn Wilson =

American politician

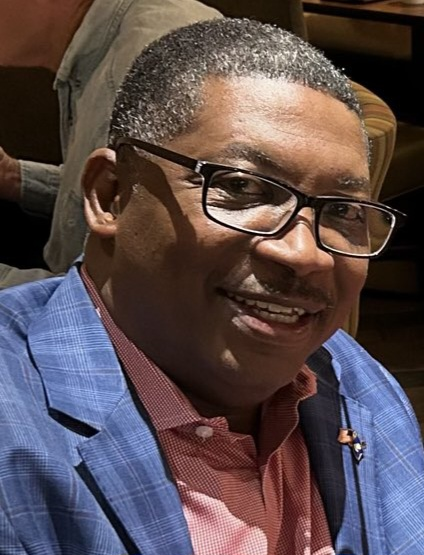
- Wilson in 2023

Secretary of the Louisiana Department of Transportation and Development
- In office January 11, 2016 – March 4, 2023
- Governor: John Bel Edwards
- Preceded by: Sherri LeBas
- Succeeded by: Eric Kalivoda

Personal details
- Born: New Orleans, Louisiana, U.S.
- Party: Democratic
- Children: 2
- Education: University of Louisiana at Lafayette (BA); Southern University (MPA, PhD)
- Website: Campaign website

Shawn D. Wilson is an American politician and transportation official who served as the secretary of the Louisiana Department of Transportation and Development from 2016 to 2023. Wilson unsuccessfully ran for governor of Louisiana in 2023 and came in second place to Republican Jeff Landry in a jungle primary receiving 25.9% of the vote.

== Early life and career ==
Wilson is from New Orleans. He intended to pursue nursing but changed his path after the death of his father. In 1993, Wilson completed a bachelor's degree in Urban and Regional Planning from the University of Louisiana at Lafayette. He was president of the Student Government Association and was the student member on the University of Louisiana System board. Wilson earned both a master's degree and Ph.D. in Public Administration from Southern University. His 2015 dissertation was titled A comparative study of transportation decision making by state and locally elected officials in Louisiana. James S. Larson was Wilson's doctoral advisor.

Wilson was executive director of the Louisiana Serve Commission and served as the deputy legislative director for Governor Kathleen Blanco. In 2005, Wilson joined the Louisiana Department of Transportation and Development as a confidential assistant to Secretary Johnny Bradberry. In 2007, Wilson was a candidate for Lafayette Parish Council. He lost in a runoff. Wilson served as chief of staff to state transportation secretary William Anker and Sherri LeBas. Wilson was appointed secretary by Governor John Bel Edwards, beginning his term on January 11, 2016. In 2021, Wilson was elected president of the American Association of State Highway and Transportation Officials. He is the first African-American to serve in the role.

== 2023 Louisiana gubernatorial election ==
In December 2022, Wilson established an exploratory committee for the 2023 Louisiana gubernatorial election. On February 15, 2023, Wilson announced that he would be resigning as secretary effective March 4, 2023, which was taken as confirmation that he would run for governor.

On March 6, 2023, Wilson officially launched his campaign for Governor of Louisiana. As the only major Democratic candidate in the race, Wilson garnered the endorsements of incumbent governor John Bel Edwards, the Louisiana Democratic Party, and former 2022 Senate candidate Gary Chambers.

Wilson stood second in the jungle primary with 25 percent of the vote, losing to Republican Jeff Landry. As Landry won over 50% vote in the primary, no runoff was needed.

== Electoral history ==
=== Lafayette Parish Council ===
2007

Blanket primary
Party	Candidate	Votes	%
Democratic	Brandon Shelvin	986	25.85%
Democratic	Shawn Wilson	718	18.83%
Democratic	Lloyd Rochon	586	15.36%
Democratic	Dale J. Brasseaux	515	13.50%
Democratic	Amos Batiste Jr.	513	13.45%
Democratic	Shelton J. Cobb	496	13.00%

Runoff
Party	Candidate	Votes	%
Democratic	Brandon Shelvin	1,656	57.34%
Democratic	Shawn Wilson	1,232	42.66%

=== Governor of Louisiana ===
2023

2023 Louisiana gubernatorial election
Party	Candidate	Votes	%
Republican	Jeff Landry	547,827	51.6
Democratic	Shawn Wilson	275,525	25.9
Republican	Stephen Waguespack	62,287	5.9
Republican	John Schroder	56,654	5.3
Independent	Hunter Lundy	52,165	4.9
Democratic	Danny Cole	27,662	2.6
Republican	Sharon Hewitt	18,468	1.7
Independent	Benjamin Barnes	5,190	0.5
Republican	Dat Barthel	4,426	0.4
Republican	Richard Nelson (withdrawn)	3,605	0.3
Independent	Jeffery Istre	3,400	0.3
Republican	Xavier Ellis	1,734	0.2
Independent	Keitron Gagnon	1,260	0.1
Republican	Xan John	1,164	0.1
Independent	Frank Scurlock	1,131	0.1
Total votes		1,062,498	100.0
Republican gain from Democratic			

== Personal life ==
Wilson and his wife, Rocki, live in Lafayette, Louisiana. They have two children. He is a Progressive Baptist and a member of Alpha Phi Alpha Fraternity, Inc.

Party political offices
Preceded by John Bel Edwards	Democratic nominee for Governor of Louisiana; 2023	Most recent
