= Ramon Romero Jr. =

Texas state legislator

Member of the Texas House of Representatives from the 90th district
- Incumbent
- Assumed office January 13, 2015
- Preceded by: Lon Burnam

Personal details
- Born: November 13, 1973 (age 52) Fort Worth, Texas, U.S.
- Party: Democratic
- Education: Tarrant County College
- Occupation: Business owner
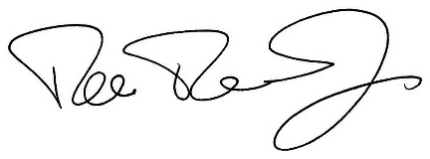
- Signature
- Website: www.ramonromerojr.com

Ramon Romero Jr. is a Democratic member of the Texas House of Representatives, serving since 2015. He was elected to the House of Representatives in 2014 to represent District 90, located entirely within the city limits of Fort Worth.

== Biography ==
Ramon Romero Jr. was born and raised in east Fort Worth. In his early twenties, he founded and continues to own A-Fast Tile & Coping, and has since become the owner of Stone Mason Supply. In the early 2000s, he was appointed to the Fort Worth Zoning Commission and chaired the Planning Commission.

== Texas House of Representatives ==
In the 2014 Democratic primary election, Romero defeated long-time Democratic Representative Lon Burnam. He made history by becoming the first Latino Representative to represent Tarrant County.

Elected in 2024, Romero serves as Chair of the Texas House's Mexican American Legislative Caucus (MALC). MALC is the oldest and largest Latino legislative caucus in the United States.

During the 89th Legislative First Called Special Session in August 2025, Romero was one of the members of the Texas House Democratic Caucus that broke quorum, delaying the mid-decade Congressional redistricting plan proposed by Texas Republicans at the request of President Donald Trump.

Romero fasted for three days in April 2017 in opposition to Texas Senate Bill 4. In 2021, he tested positive for COVID-19 with mild symptoms.

== Legislative Committees ==
Romero is currently serving as a member of the following committees:

- Licensing & Administrative Procedures, Member
- Natural Resources, Member
- Calendars, Member

== Election History ==
=== 2014 ===
Texas Primary Election 2014: House District 90
Party	Candidate	Votes	%	±%
Democratic	Ramon Romero Jr.	2,594	51.08	0.00
Democratic	Lon Burnam	2,484	48.92	0.0

=== 2016 ===
Texas General Election 2016: House District 90
Party	Candidate	Votes	%	±%
Democratic	Ramon Romero Jr.	20,925	100	0.00

=== 2018 ===
Texas General Election 2018: House District 90
Party	Candidate	Votes	%	±%
Democratic	Ramon Romero Jr.	20,728	100	0.00

=== 2020 ===
Texas General Election 2020: House District 90
Party	Candidate	Votes	%	±%
Democratic	Ramon Romero Jr.	2,594	72.4	−27.6
Republican	Elva Camacho	9,656	27.6	0.0

=== 2022 ===
Texas Primary Election 2022: House District 90
Party	Candidate	Votes	%	±%
Democratic	Ramon Romero Jr.	5,399	100	0.00

=== 2024 ===
Texas General Election 2024: House District 90
Party	Candidate	Votes	%	±%
Democratic	Ramon Romero Jr.	35,674	100	0.00
