= Richard Nelson (politician) =

American engineer, attorney, and politician

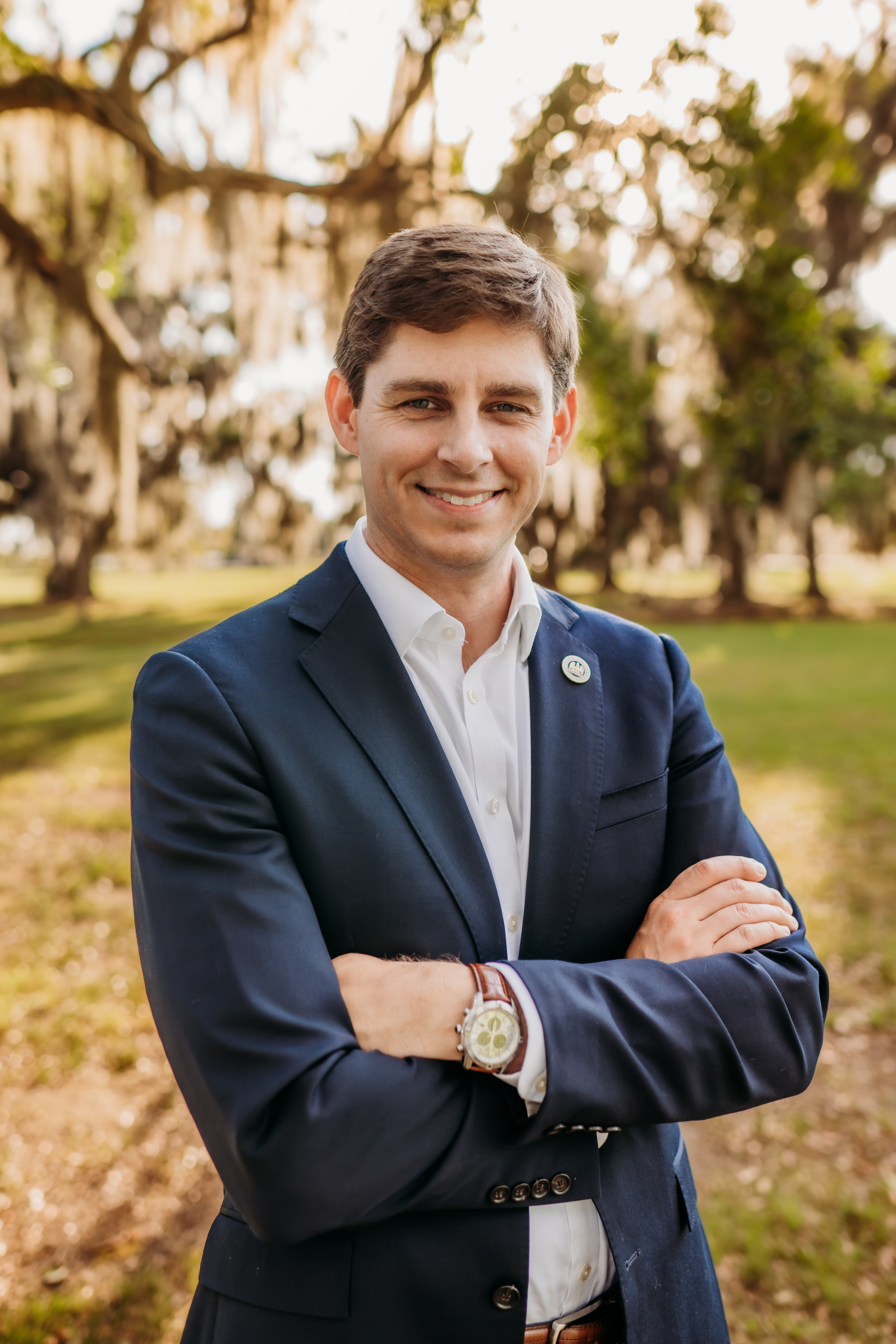

President of the Louisiana Community and Technical College System
- Incumbent
- Assumed office January 1, 2026
- Preceded by: Monty Sullivan

Secretary of the Louisiana Department of Revenue
- In office January 8, 2024 – December 4, 2025
- Governor: Jeff Landry
- Preceded by: Kevin Richard
- Succeeded by: Jarrod Coniglio

Member of the Louisiana House of Representatives from the 89th district
- In office January 13, 2020 – January 8, 2024
- Preceded by: Reid Falconer
- Succeeded by: Christopher Kim Carver

Personal details
- Born: May 20, 1986 (age 40) McAllen, Texas, U.S.
- Party: Republican
- Spouse: Ashley
- Children: 3
- Education: Louisiana State University (BS, JD)

Richard James Nelson (born May 20, 1986) is an American politician, engineer, attorney, and academic administrator who is the president of the Louisiana Community and Technical College System since January 2026. A member of the Republican Party, he served as Secretary of the Louisiana Department of Revenue from 2024 to 2025, under by Governor Jeff Landry, and represented Louisiana's 89th district in the Louisiana House of Representatives from 2020 to 2024. He was a candidate for governor of Louisiana in the 2023 Louisiana elections.

== Early life and education ==
Richard Nelson was born on May 20, 1986, in McAllen, Texas, to Michael and Deborah Nelson. He is the second of four children.

Nelson graduated from Mandeville High School in 2004. While in high school, he also became an Eagle Scout.

Nelson graduated summa cum laude from Louisiana State University in 2007 with a Bachelor of Science in Biological engineering. He graduated from Paul M. Hebert Law Center in 2010. Nelson was a member of the Louisiana Law Review and Order of the Coif.

== Career ==
After he graduated law school, Nelson joined the United States Foreign Service as a Security Engineering Officer and diplomat. He served in Frankfurt, Germany, Tbilisi, Georgia, and Washington, D.C., while also leading projects in regions such as Afghanistan, Pakistan, Iraq, and Libya. During his career with the State Department, Nelson earned several awards including the Meritorious Honor Award and the Superior Honor Award.

Nelson resigned from the State Department in 2017 to work for a consulting firm in his hometown of Mandeville, Louisiana. He launched his own consulting company in 2020.

Nelson ran for State Representative in 2019 nonpartisan primary election as one of four Republicans. He ran for office on the platform of eliminating the income tax in Louisiana. Nelson won in the run-off general election against a fellow Republican and was sworn into office on January 13, 2020. In 2023, Nelson ran for Governor of the State of Louisiana, eventually withdrawing from the race and endorsing front runner Jeff Landry. In 2024, Governor Landry appointed Nelson to serve as the Secretary to the Louisiana Department of Revenue. On December 4, 2025, he was succeeded as secretary by Jarrod Coniglio. On January 1, 2026, Nelson became the president of the Louisiana Community and Technical College System, succeeding Monty Sullivan.

== Personal life ==
Nelson and his wife, Ashley, have three sons.
