= John Schroder =

American politician

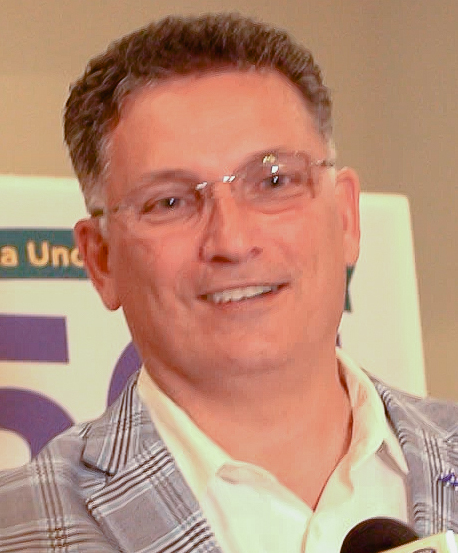

Treasurer of Louisiana
- In office November 18, 2017 – January 8, 2024
- Governor: John Bel Edwards
- Preceded by: John Kennedy
- Succeeded by: John Fleming

Member of the Louisiana House of Representatives from the 77th district
- In office January 14, 2008 – June 8, 2017
- Preceded by: Diane Winston
- Succeeded by: Mark Wright

Personal details
- Born: February 23, 1961 (age 65) Covington, Louisiana, U.S.
- Party: Republican
- Spouse: Ellie Daigle
- Children: 2
- Education: Southeastern Louisiana University (BS)

John Michael Schroder Sr. (born February 23, 1961) is an American businessman from Covington, Louisiana who served as state treasurer from 2017 to 2024. He was formerly a Republican member of the Louisiana House of Representatives for District 77 in St. Tammany Parish in suburban New Orleans.

Schroder was a candidate for Governor of Louisiana in 2023, receiving 5.3% of the vote coming in fourth place, which was won by fellow Republican Jeff Landry.

== Career ==
Schroder vacated his House seat on June 8, 2017, to devote full-time to his campaign for Louisiana state treasurer in the special election set for October 14, 2017, to fill the position vacated on January 3 by U.S. Senator John Kennedy. In his statement of candidacy, Schroder said that he has recognized since his election to the State House that "we had fundamental issues with our budget and spending practices. I have always taken a stand for the Louisiana taxpayer and that will not change when elected treasurer." State Senator Neil Riser of Columbia in Caldwell Parish in North Louisiana was also a candidate for the seat. John Schroder and Democrat Derrick Edwards advanced to the runoff, where Schroder won. In October 2022 Schroder said Louisiana pulled $794 million out of the BlackRock Inc. investment firm due to the company putting political and social goals ahead of robust returns for state taxpayers. Jessi Parfair, campaign representative at the Sierra Club's "Beyond Dirty Fuels" campaign called Schroder's announcement "just another flavor of climate denial cooked up by right-wing politicians and their fossil fuel donors."

On February 9, 2023, Schroder formally announced he was running for governor of Louisiana in the 2023 election. He ultimately finished fourth in the jungle primary, receiving 5.3% percent of the vote.

Party political offices
Preceded by John Kennedy	Republican nominee for Louisiana State Treasurer; 2017, 2019	Succeeded by John Fleming
Louisiana House of Representatives
Preceded by Diane Winston	Member of the Louisiana House of Representatives from the 77th district 2008–2017	Succeeded by Mark Wright
Political offices
Preceded by John Kennedy	Treasurer of Louisiana; 2017–2024	Succeeded by John Fleming
