= Beckham (surname) =

Beckham is an English-language placename, and a surname derived from Beckham, Norfolk. Notable people with the name include:

- Albert Sidney Beckham (1897–1964), African American psychologist
- Barry Beckham (born 1944), American playwright and novelist
- Bob Beckham (1927–2013), American country singer
- Brice Beckham (born 1976), American actor
- Brooklyn Beckham (born 1999), English model and photographer, son of David Beckham
- Chayce Beckham (born 1996), American singer-songwriter and musician, winner of the nineteenth season of the singing show American Idol
- Christopher Beckham (born 1977), American musician
- Clark Beckham (born 1992), American singer-songwriter and musician
- David Beckham (born 1975), English footballer
- Gordon Beckham (born 1986), American baseball player
- J. C. W. Beckham (1869–1940), American politician and former Governor of Kentucky and US Senator
- Jackson Beckham (born 1994), Brazilian footballer
- Janette Hales Beckham (1933–2022), American politician from Utah and Mormon women's leader
- Joseph Beckham (born 1945), American university chairman
- Mike Beckham (born 1970), Cook Islands rugby union player
- Norm Beckham (1903–1983, Australian rules footballer
- Odell Beckham Jr. (born 1992), American football player
- Robert Emmett Beckham (1844–1910), American politician
- Robert Franklin Beckham (1837–1864), American artillery officer
- Romeo Beckham (born 2002), English footballer, son of David Beckham
- Rodrigo Beckham (born 1976), Brazilian footballer
- Stephen Dow Beckham, American historian
- Terron Beckham (born 1992), American content creator
- Thomas Beckham (1810–1875), New Zealand politician
- Tim Beckham (born 1990), American baseball player
- Tony Beckham (born 1978), American football player
- Trap Beckham (born 1991), stage name of Travis Cave, American hip hop artist
- Victoria Beckham (born 1974), English singer, songwriter, fashion designer and television personality, wife of David Beckham
- Walter C. Beckham (1916–1996), American air force officer
