= John Peter Smith =

John Peter Smith may refer to:

- John Peter Smith (Texas politician) (1831–1901), known as the 'Father of Fort Worth'
- John Peter Smith (Montana politician) (1848–?), mayor of Missoula, Montana

== See also ==
- John Peter Smith Hospital, Ft. Worth, Texas
- John Peter Smith Health Network, Tarrant County, Texas
- John Smith (disambiguation)
