= William Smartt Pendleton =

American politician and lawyer (1848–1933)

- Pendleton's portrait for the 19th Texas Legislature

Member of the Texas House of Representatives from the 34th district
- In office January 13, 1885 – January 11, 1887
- Preceded by: Andrew Jackson Chambers
- Succeeded by: Elihu Newton

Mayor of Fort Worth, Texas
- In office April 8, 1890 – August 5, 1890
- Preceded by: H. S. Broiles
- Succeeded by: John Peter Smith

Member of the Oklahoma Legislature
- In office 1921–1923

Personal details
- Born: February 6, 1848 Warren County, Tennessee, US
- Died: March 22, 1933 (aged 85) Shawnee, Oklahoma, US
- Party: Democratic
- Relations: George C. Pendleton (brother); K. M. Van Zandt (brother-in-law)
- Parent: Edmund Gaines Pendleton (father)
- Occupation: Politcian, lawyer

William Smartt Pendleton (February 6, 1848 – March 22, 1933) was an American politician and lawyer. A Democrat, he was Mayor of Fort Worth, Texas and a member of the Texas House of Representatives.

Born in Tennessee, Pendleton lived between there in Texas throughout his childhood before settling in Fort Worth in 1873. He was a lawyer. He was a member of the House from 1885 to 1887, and was Mayor in 1890, resigning from the latter office due to having his affair publicized. He moved to New York, then to Amarillo, and to Oklahoma, where he was a member of the state legislature.

== Early life and education ==
Pendleton was born on February 6, 1848, in Warren County, Tennessee, the son of politician Edmund Gaines Pendleton and Sarah (née Smartt) Pendleton. His brother was politician George C. Pendleton and his sister, Octavia, married K. M. Van Zandt. He was of English descent.

In 1857, Pendleton and his family moved to Ellis County, Texas. After his father's death in 1868, they moved to Manchester, Tennessee. There, he attended public schools and studied at Manchester College, after which he worked as an educator for a short time.

== Career ==
=== Early career ===
In 1873, Pendleton moved to Fort Worth, Texas. There, he established a law practice with Joseph C. Terrell, which lasted until March 1876, after which he practiced independently. By 1884, he had partnered with brothers Newton Rhea Bowlin and C. Ross Bowlin. In early 1876, he was made an editor of The Fort Worth Standard. In August 1878, he was fined $100 for brawling with an opposing attorney who had insulted him during his closing arguments, and in 1882, was fined for fighting in public.

=== Texas House, return to private career, and Mayor of Fort Worth ===
Pendleton was a Democrat. In August 1873, he unsuccessfully ran for justice of the peace. In February 1874, he announced himself as a candidate for district attorney of Tarrant County, though withdrew in April. In November 1878, he was elected the district attorney. Ideologically, he was a supporter of the "free grass", which opposed leasing public land for ranchers and schools.

Pendleton was a member of the Texas House of Representatives, from January 13, 1885, to January 11, 1887, representing the 34th district. While serving, he was chairman of the Committee on Towns, Cities, and Corporations, and was a member of the Committees on the Judiciary; on Privileges and Elections; and on Public Land and Land Office. He proposed ten bills, with two passing. One reworded the code for jury selection, while the other changed the open days of the Seventeenth Judicial District court. He opposed Prohibition.

In 1885, Pendleton was a cofounder of the Fort Worth & New Orleans Railroad. He established the law practice Pendleton & Powell, which in February 1886, became Pendleton, Chapman & Powell. During the Great Southwest railroad strike of 1886, he was appointed by Mayor John Peter Smith to maintain order. In May 1886, he was made director of an organization to establish a law library for the Tarrant County Courthouse. He was also a director of the Democrat Publishing Company, publisher of the Fort Worth Gazette.

Pendleton was Mayor of Fort Worth from April 8, to August 5, 1890, having won the election against William John Bailey and H. S. Broiles. Compared to Bailey, he was more fiscally conservative, with him supporting public improvements, so long as the city budget not be exceeded, in order to "bring in more capitalists". At the first City Council meeting of his term, he removed Bailey from the Committee on and reassigned him to the Finance to the Committee on Sewers. Bailey resigned from City Council the following day, though was re-elected. Pendleton resigned on August 5, after his affair was publicized.

=== Later career ===
After resigning, Pendleton moved to New York, where he practiced law. However, he lacked connections, so moved to Amarillo in November 1893. In 1894, he moved to Tecumseh, Oklahoma Territory, where he practiced law. From 1894 to 1896, he was a United States commissioner, and from 1901 to 1903, was probate judge of Pottawatomie County. In 1898, he moved to Shawnee. In 1905, he established a law firm with W. M. Melton and D. B. Madden. He was later a member of Pendleton, Abernethy & Howell. In July 1905, he was the Pottawatomie County delegate to the Single Statehood Convention in Oklahoma City. From 1917 to 1919, and again from 1923 to 1929, he was judge of Pottawatomie County. From 1921 to 1923, he was a member of the Oklahoma Legislature. He retired in 1928, after losing his re-election for judge.

== Personal life and death ==
On October 5, 1875, Pendleton married Isabelle Shelton, with whom he had four children. Around 1888, Pendleton had an affair with Adelaide "Addie" Cullen, a c. 17-year-old telephone operator at his law office. In July 1899, he attempted to file a no-fault divorce without informing his wife, by forging her signature, though misspelled her name on the papers. His wife discovered love letters between he and Cullen in March 1890, though kept it the matter secret.

On July 5, 1892, Pendleton and Cullen eloped in New Orleans. The affair was publicized during his honeymoonl with reporters in Chicago proving his divorce papers to be fraudulent. He and his wife officially divorced on October 4, with he and Cullen marrying on October 22. Cullen died on July 25, 1906. On October 20, 1907, he married the 19-year-old Rosa Addie Prather, who he divorced on December 14, 1909.

Pendleton was a member of the Knights of Pythias. He died on March 22, 1933, aged 85, in Shawnee, and was buried at Fairview Cemetery, in Shawnee.
