= 2011 Fort Worth mayoral election =

- May 14, 2011 (first round); June 18, 2011 (runoff)
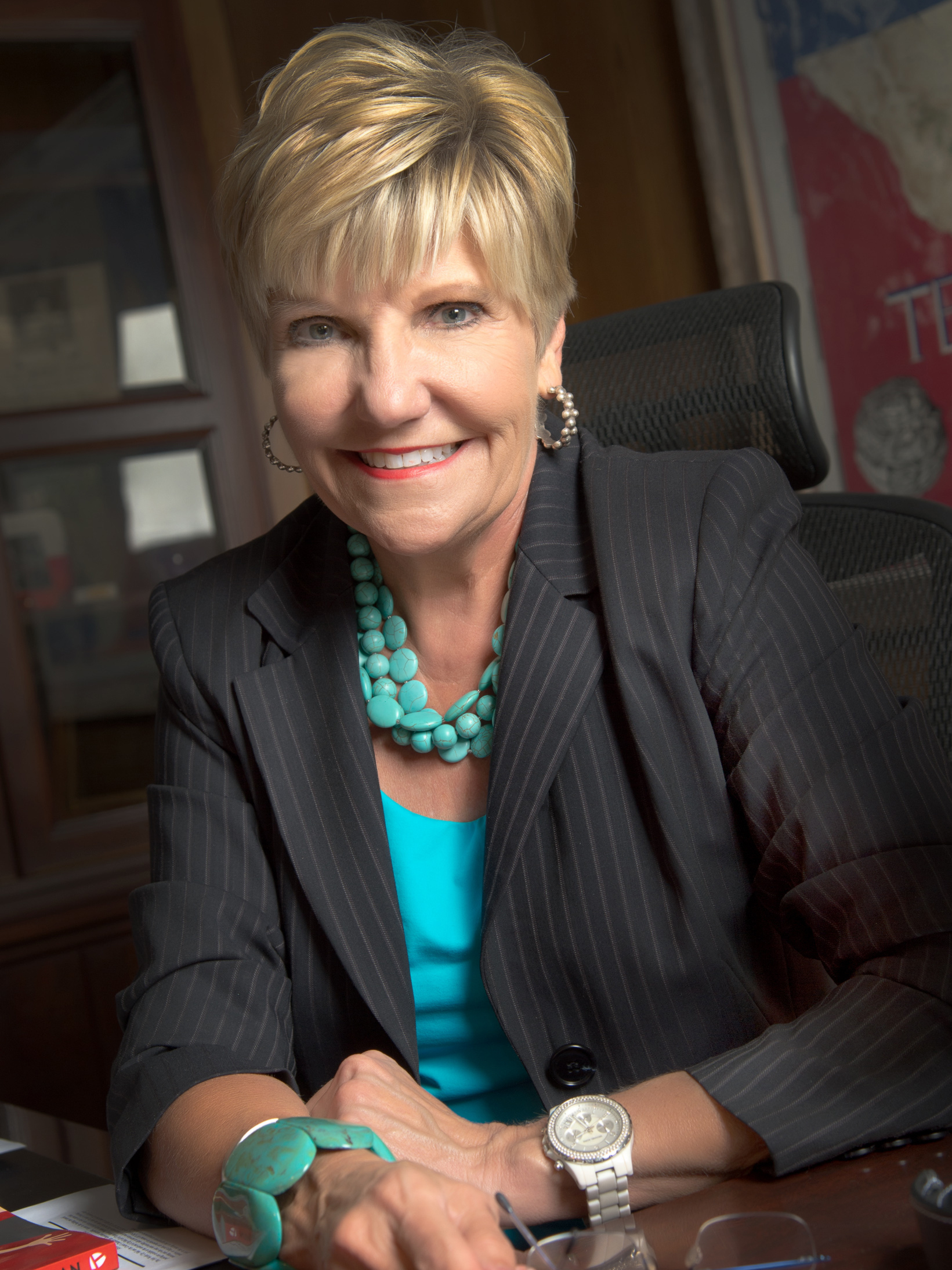

Candidate	Betsy Price	Jim Lane	Cathy Hirt
Party	Nonpartisan	Nonpartisan	Nonpartisan
First round vote	14,585	8,838	7,207
First round percentage	43.29%	26.24%	21.39%
Runoff vote	19,963	15,725
Runoff percentage	55.94%	44.06%
Candidate	Dan Barret
Party	Nonpartisan
First round vote	2,801
First round percentage	8.32%
Mayor before election
Mike Moncrief
Democratic
Elected mayor
Betsy Price
Republican

The 2011 Fort Worth mayoral election was held on May 14 and June 18, 2011, to elect the next mayor of Fort Worth, Texas. The incumbent mayor Mike Moncrief did not seek reelection after having served four terms as mayor of Fort Worth since 2003. Republican Betsy Price won the election against Democrat Jim Lane and succeeded Moncrief on July 12, 2011.

== Qualifications ==
As with most cities in Texas, a candidate for mayor does not run on a partisan ballot. The only qualifications for a candidate are:

- Be a United States citizen
- Be 21 years of age
- Be a qualified voter
- Considered of sound mind with no mental impediments
- No prior felony record for which one has not been pardoned
- Resided continuously in the state for 12 months and the city and/or district for 6 months before the first filing date

== Candidates ==
- Dan Barrett - attorney, former Texas State Representative (2007–2009)
- Cathy Hirt - consultant, former Fort Worth City Council member (1996–1999)
- Jim Lane - attorney, Tarrant Regional Water Board, Fort Worth City Council member (1993–2005)
- Betsy Price - Tarrant County Tax Assessor (2001–2011)
- Nicholas Zebrun - videographer and filmmaker, producer and writer

== Results ==
=== First-round ===
First round results
Party	Candidate	Votes	%
Nonpartisan	Betsy Price	14,585	43.29
Nonpartisan	Jim Lane	8,838	26.24
Nonpartisan	Cathy Hirt	7,207	21.39
Nonpartisan	Dan Barret	2,801	8.32
Nonpartisan	Nicolas Zebrun	257	0.76
Total votes		33,688	

=== Runoff ===
Runoff results
Party	Candidate	Votes	%
Nonpartisan	Betsy Price	19,963	55.94
Nonpartisan	Jim Lane	15,725	44.06
Total votes		35,688	
