= William Paxton Burts =

American physician and politician (1827–1895)

1st Mayor of Fort Worth, TX
- In office February 17, 1873 - October 29, 1882
- Preceded by: Office Established
- Succeeded by: Giles Hiram Day

Personal details
- Born: December 7, 1827 Washington County, Tennessee, U.S.
- Died: September 5, 1895 (aged 67) Fort Worth, Texas, U.S.
- Profession: Mayor

William Paxton Burts (December 7, 1827 – September 5, 1895) was an American physician and politician. Burts was born in Washington County, Tennessee, and relocated to Fort Worth in 1858. He served as the first mayor of Fort Worth, Texas, serving from 1873 until 1875.

Burts died on September 5, 1895, and is buried at the Oakwood Cemetery.
