= 2009 Fort Worth mayoral election =

- May 9, 2009
- Turnout: 6.12%
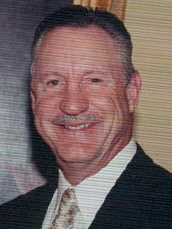

Candidate	Mike Moncrief	Clyde Picht	Louis McBee
Party	Nonpartisan	Nonpartisan	Nonpartisan
Popular vote	13,990	4,376	1,532
Percentage	70.31%	21.99%	7.70%
Mayor before election
Mike Moncrief
Democratic
Elected mayor
Mike Moncrief
Democratic

The 2009 Fort Worth mayoral election took place on May 9, 2009, to elect the Mayor of Fort Worth, Texas. The election was held concurrently with various other local elections, and was officially nonpartisan. The election saw the reelection of incumbent mayor Mike Moncrief.

The mayoral term in Fort Worth is two years.

If no candidate received a majority of the vote in the general election, a runoff would have been held.

== General election ==
=== Results ===
Results
Party	Candidate	Votes	%
Nonpartisan	Mike Moncrief (incumbent)	13,990	70.31
Nonpartisan	Clyde Picht	4,376	21.99
Nonpartisan	Louis "Mac" McBee	1,532	7.70
Total votes		19,898	
