= William D. Davis =

American politician (1867–1942)

William D. "Bill" Davis
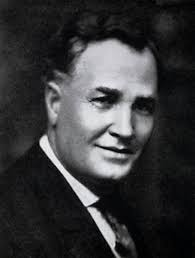
- Davis c. 1942

Mayor of Fort Worth
- In office June 1, 1909 – April 15, 1913
- Preceded by: William D. Williams
- Succeeded by: Robert F. Milam

Mayor of Fort Worth
- In office April 1917 – April 1921
- Preceded by: William Bryce
- Succeeded by: E. R. Cockrell

3rd Mayor of North Fort Worth
- In office 1908 – June 1, 1909
- Preceded by: James M. Scott
- Succeeded by: Office abolished (North Fort Worth annexed by Fort Worth)

Personal details
- Born: October 30, 1867 Neshoba County, Mississippi, U.S.
- Died: August 2, 1942 (aged 74) Fort Worth, Texas, U.S.
- Resting place: West Hill Cemetery, Sherman, Texas
- Party: Democratic
- Spouses: Ella P. Reynolds (m. 1890; died 1908); Malissa "Ola" DeOlar (Henderson) Price (m. 1909; div. by 1920)
- Children: 2 (including Marvin Lester Davis)
- Occupation: Cattleman, businessman, oil entrepreneur, politician
- Known for: Annexation of North Fort Worth; construction of Lake Worth

William D. "Bill" Davis (October 30, 1867 – August 2, 1942) was an American cattleman, businessman, oil entrepreneur, and Democratic politician who served as the third mayor of North Fort Worth and later as mayor of Fort Worth, Texas. A leading figure in Fort Worth's political and civic life during the early twentieth century, he played a central role in the 1909 annexation of North Fort Worth into Fort Worth and served multiple terms as mayor of the consolidated city.

== Early life and education ==
Davis was born on October 30, 1867. He was a native of Neshoba County, Mississippi, and the son of Moses Davis and Cynthia Threatt Davis. He attended rural schools before studying at Granbury College. In December 1869, his family moved to Glen Rose, Texas, and by 1880 they had settled in Limestone County, where they farmed.

== Business career ==
During the 1890s, Davis lived in Galveston, Texas, where he was a major wheat trader. He went bankrupt after a large shipment of wheat was lost in a flood. By 1900, he had relocated to Denton and entered the cattle business as a buyer and seller. He later went bankrupt again during the Panic of 1907. A few years later, he acquired a large cattle ranch, in which he also grew wheat, near Waurika, Oklahoma. Davis was also involved in the oil business through the Bill Davis Oil Association, a private company organized to develop his oil leases.

After his last campaign for mayor in 1920, Davis resumed his cattle business and operated a 30,000-acre ranch near Waurika, Oklahoma, for a number of years.

== Mayor of North Fort Worth ==
In January 1906, Davis entered politics with the organization of a "Davis Club" in North Fort Worth to campaign for his mayoral election. He was a member of the Democratic Party, and was elected the municipality's third mayor in 1908. He became one of the principal advocates of annexing North Fort Worth into the City of Fort Worth in 1909.

== Mayor of Fort Worth ==
Following the resignation of Fort Worth mayor W. D. Williams to accept a post on the Texas Railroad Commission, Davis was elected mayor of Fort Worth by a two-to-one margin, with the North Side solidly behind him. He defeated R. H. McNatt in the Democratic primary held in May 1909 and then stood unopposed in the special election on May 29, receiving all 339 votes cast. He was sworn into office on June 1, 1909.

Davis was re-elected mayor in 1910. In March, Davis organized the construction of two gravel railroad crossings to connect roads divided by tracks of the Gulf, Colorado and Santa Fe Railway after the company had repeatedly delayed their construction. The work was carried out at night without the railroad's consent. In April, Davis organised a campaign to assist federal census enumerators in obtaining a complete population count for Fort Worth.

In September 1911, Davis signed the contract authorizing construction of the Lake Worth dam on behalf of the City of Fort Worth.

Davis was defeated by Robert Milam in the 1912 city election for mayor. He left office on April 15, 1913.

In 1913, Davis opposed the proposed McNealus anti-stream pollution bill, arguing before the House Committee on Public Health that compliance would be inconvenient and expensive for Fort Worth. He also maintained that Dallas would have opposed the legislation had it been situated upstream.

In June 1913, Davis inspected construction of the Lake Worth reservoir and expressed confidence that the work could be completed within four months if allowed to proceed without interruption.

Davis was defeated again in 1914 in a three-cornered race against Robert Milam and E. T. Tyra, with Tyra emerging as the victor.

Davis returned to the mayoral race in 1916 and defeated Robert Harrison. He was re-elected in 1918 without making a single campaign speech and defeated two opponents, T. A. Altman, and E. L. Stevens. His 1918 re-election campaign called for open sessions of government, opposition to closed-door meetings, lower streetcar fares, and economy in administration.

Davis was defeated for re-election in 1920 by E. R. Cockrell and was again unsuccessful in his 1922 bid to unseat Cockrell. The latter campaign marked the end of the commission form of government in Fort Worth and the establishment of the city council–city manager plan.

Although he did not return to the mayor's office, Davis remained active in Fort Worth politics.

=== Lake Worth and municipal improvements ===
Davis advocated the construction of Lake Worth. Construction of the city-owned dam and reservoir began in 1912 and was completed in October 1914. The project was both supported and criticised, with supporters citing the water it would provide for future growth and fire protection, while opponents objected to its cost. The project's cost remained a recurring issue for Davis in the years that followed.

Davis was honored for his accomplishments and contributions to the city at a dinner held by the Half Century Club. During his administration as mayor, the construction of Lake Worth was described as one of his outstanding accomplishments. It was described as be the foundation of an adequate city water supply.

While mayor of Fort Worth, Mr. Davis was known as a builder. It was during his administration that many streets were paved.

== Civic and public activities ==
Davis was elected president of the Texas Mayors' Association in July 1909 during the organization's annual convention in San Angelo. He continued serving in that capacity during 1910.

In March 1911, Davis served as master of ceremonies at the opening of Fort Worth's Fifteenth Annual Fat Stock Show, which featured former President Theodore Roosevelt as the principal speaker.

In 1917, Davis served as a civilian supervisor at three U.S. Army training camps in the western United States, despite having no military service. The following year, he led Fort Worth's Third Liberty Loan campaign.

Davis was a member of Weatherford Street Methodist Church, the Ancient Arabic Order of the Nobles of the Mystic Shrine, and the Mystic Order of the Knights of Bovinia, where he held the title of "Ranch Boss." He was also a director of the American League of Municipalities.

== Later political career ==
In 1933, Davis served as foreman of the Tarrant County grand jury and later that year in November was a delegate to the Texas ratification convention in Austin.

In early 1934, Davis was elected chairman of the Tarrant County Home Rule Charter Convention and was also elected to the drafting commission. That same year, Davis ran for the Democratic nomination for Tarrant County judge but was defeated. In 1936, Davis again sought election as county judge, but narrowly lost to Dave T. Miller. During the campaign, the construction of Lake Worth was again used to attack Davis.

During his 1934 campaign for Tarrant County judge, Davis filed a libel suit against the Fort Worth Press over editorials criticizing his record as mayor. One editorial alleged that a settling basin project undertaken during his administration had cost Fort Worth taxpayers $80,000 and had been abandoned. Davis alleged that the statements were false and libelous. A jury awarded him $1,000 in actual damages, but the Texas Court of Civil Appeals reversed the judgment, finding that the statements concerning the settling basin were substantially true, except for the $80,000 amount stated in the editorial.

In 1939, Davis made his final political campaign by running for the Fort Worth City Council. He was also promoted for city manager by supporters of his candidacy and others on the same ticket.

== Personal life ==
Davis married Ella P. Reynolds in Denton, Texas, on December 18, 1890. The couple had one child, Marvin Lester Davis. Ella Davis died in August 1908, and Marvin Lester Davis died of respiratory failure in Arizona in December 1927.

In November 1909, Davis married Malissa "Ola" DeOlar (Henderson) Price in a private ceremony at her home in Aubrey, Texas. Their daughter was born in 1910 and died at ten days of age in September that year. By 1920, the couple had divorced. Davis lived with his widowed sister, Emma V. Yancy, four nephews and three nieces. One of Davis's nieces, Frances Eileen Hutt, married Thomas E. Dewey, who served as Governor of New York from 1943 to 1954 and was the Republican nominee for President of the United States in 1944 and 1948.

== Death ==
Davis suffered a heart attack on July 31, 1942, and was admitted to All Saints Hospital in Fort Worth. He died there on August 2 at the age of 74. Funeral services were held at Weatherford Street Methodist Church, where Davis was an active member, before his burial at West Hill Cemetery in Sherman, Texas.

== See also ==
- Lake Worth (Texas)
- History of Fort Worth, Texas
- List of mayors of Fort Worth, Texas
