= 2015 Fort Worth mayoral election =

- May 9, 2015
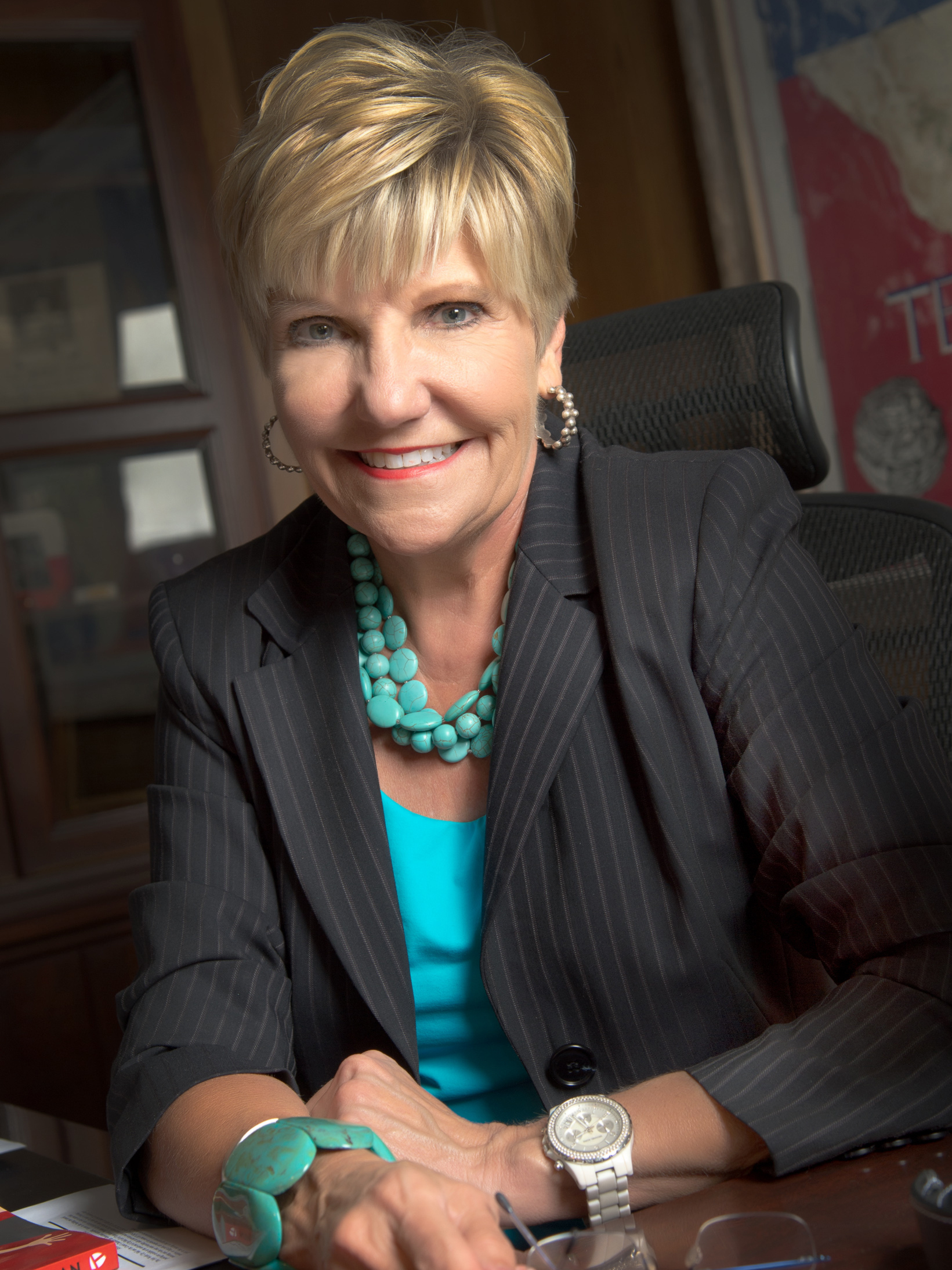
Nominee	Betsy Price
Percentage	100.0%
Mayor before election
Betsy Price
Republican
Elected Mayor
Betsy Price
Republican

The 2015 Fort Worth mayoral election took place on May 9, 2015, to elect the Mayor of Fort Worth, Texas. The election was held concurrently with various other local elections, and is officially nonpartisan.

The mayoral term in Fort Worth is two years. Incumbent Mayor Betsy Price, a Republican who was first elected in 2011, ran unopposed for a third term.

If more than two candidates had filed, and had no candidate received a majority of the vote in the general election, a runoff would have been held on June 13.

== Candidates ==
- Betsy Price, incumbent Mayor

== General election ==
=== Results ===
Fort Worth mayoral general election, 2015
Party	Candidate	Votes	%
Nonpartisan	Betsy Price		100%
Total votes			100
