= 2007 Fort Worth mayoral election =

- May 12, 2007
- Turnout: 6.93%
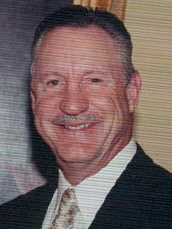

Candidate	Mike Moncrief	Louis McBee
Party	Nonpartisan	Nonpartisan
Popular vote	16,424	3,138
Percentage	80.17%	15.32%
Mayor before election
Mike Moncrief
Democratic
Elected mayor
Mike Moncrief
Democratic

The 2007 Fort Worth mayoral election took place on May 12, 2007, to elect the Mayor of Fort Worth, Texas. The election was held concurrently with various other local elections, and was officially nonpartisan. The election saw the reelection of incumbent mayor Mike Moncrief.

The mayoral term in Fort Worth is two years.

If no candidate received a majority of the vote in the general election, a runoff would have been held.

== General election ==
=== Results ===
Results
Party	Candidate	Votes	%
Nonpartisan	Mike Moncrief (incumbent)	16,424	80.17
Nonpartisan	Louis "Mac" McBee	3,138	15.32
Nonpartisan	Charles Hibbler	925	4.52
Total votes			100
