= 2017 Fort Worth mayoral election =

- May 6, 2017
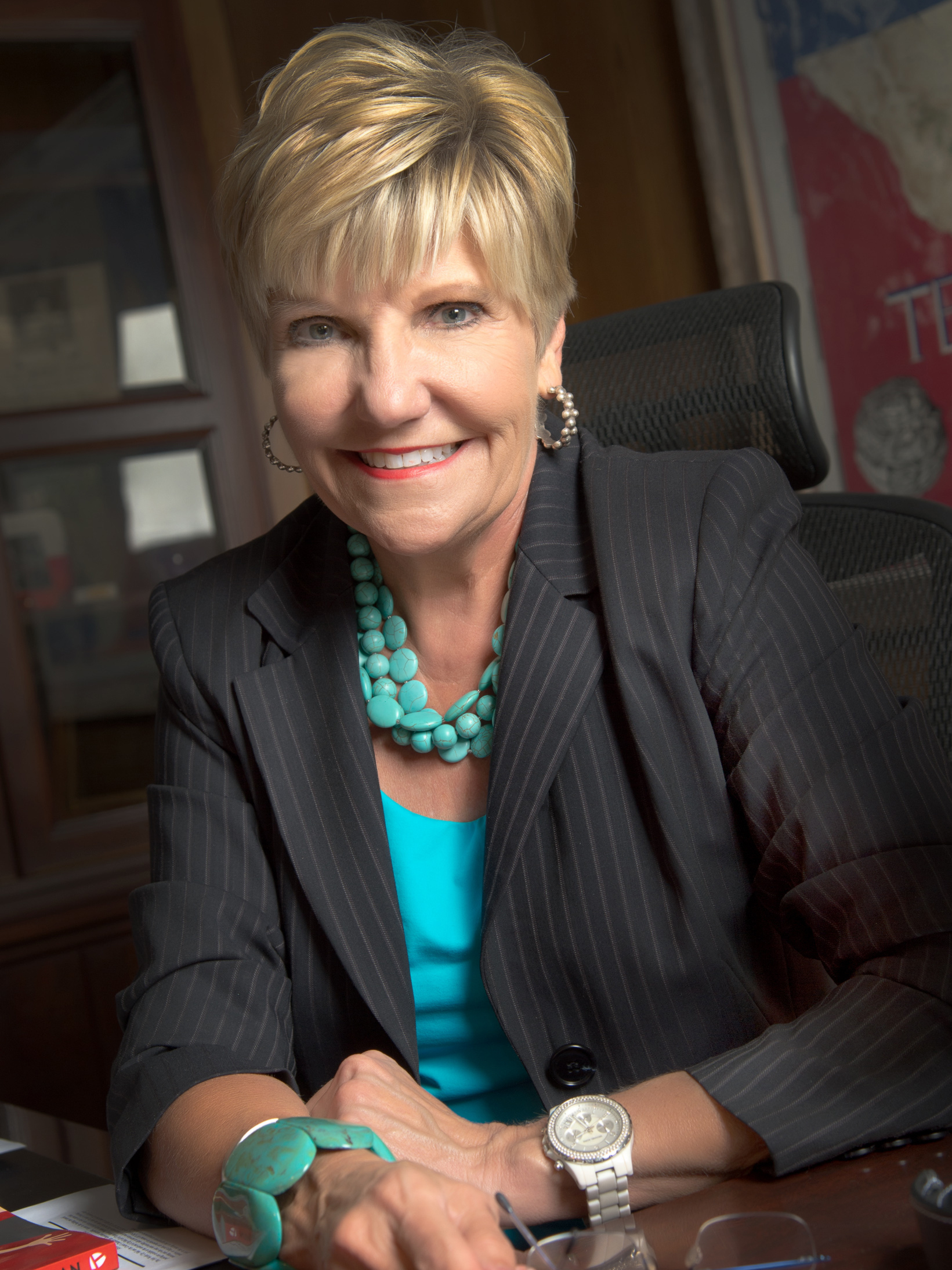

Candidate	Betsy Price	Chris Nettles
Party	Nonpartisan	Nonpartisan
Popular vote	23,140	9,775
Percentage	70.3%	29.7%
Mayor before election
Betsy Price
Republican
Elected Mayor
Betsy Price
Republican

The 2017 Fort Worth mayoral election took place on May 6, 2017, to elect the mayor of Fort Worth, Texas. The election was officially non-partisan.

Betsy Price, who was serving her third term, ran for reelection. She handily won reelection with over 70% of the vote.

== Results ==
Results
Party	Candidate	Votes	%
Nonpartisan	Betsy Price (incumbent)	23,140	70.3
Nonpartisan	Chris Nettles	9,775	29.7
