= 2019 Fort Worth mayoral election =

- May 4, 2019
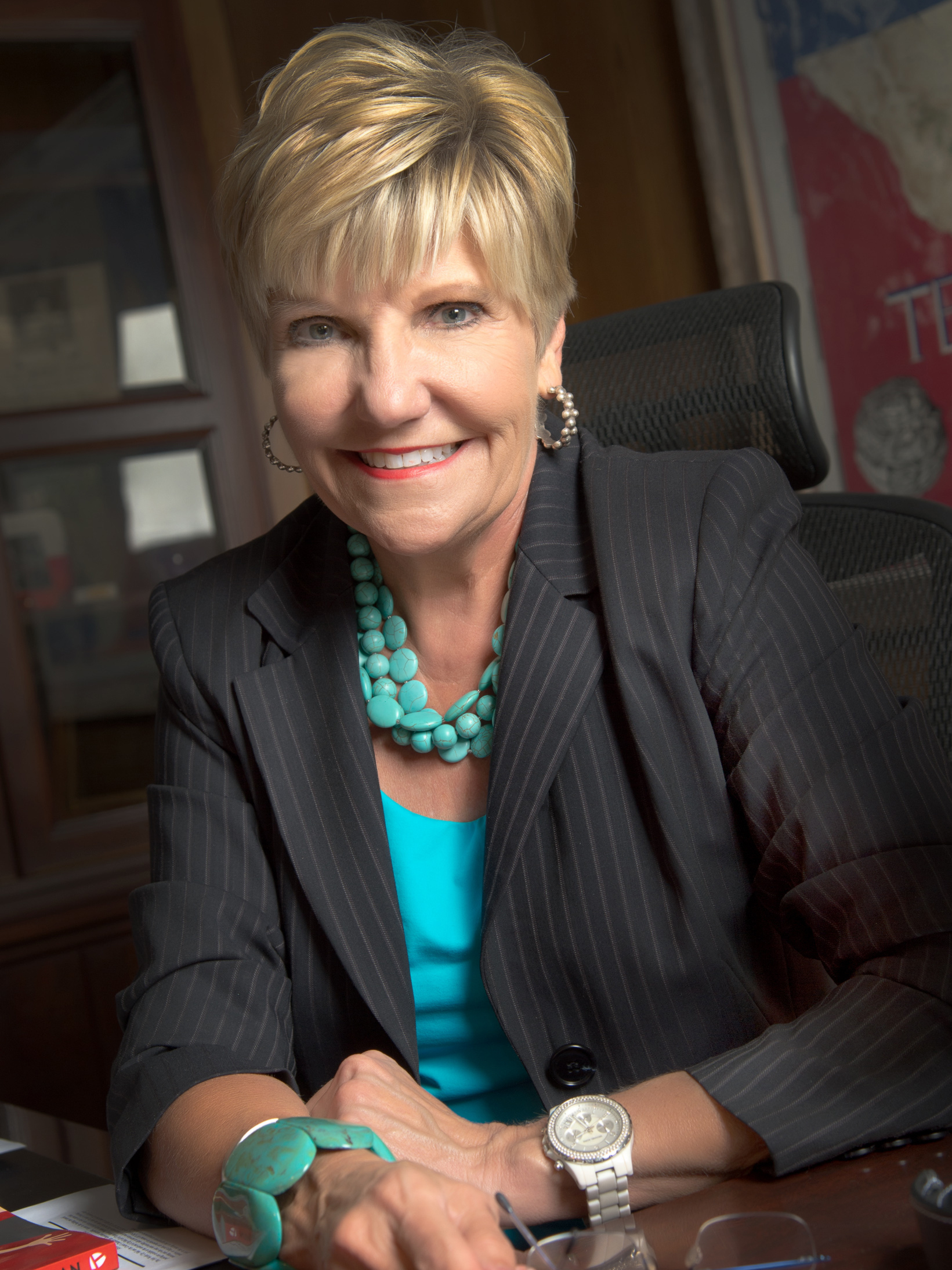

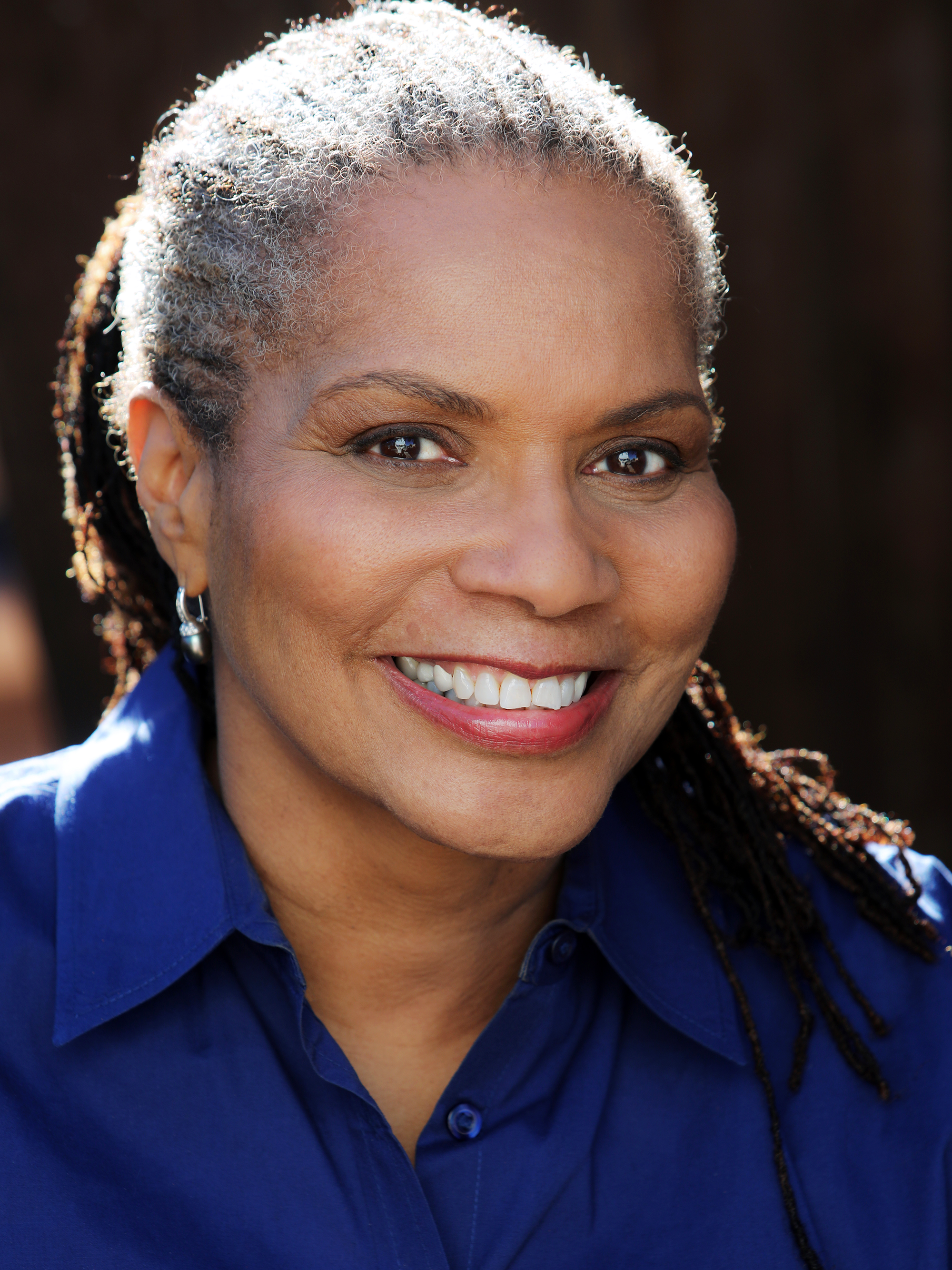
Candidate	Betsy Price	Deborah Peoples
Party	Nonpartisan	Nonpartisan
Alliance	Republican	Democratic
Popular vote	21,596	16,218
Percentage	55.7%	41.8%
Mayor before election
Betsy Price
Nonpartisan
Elected Mayor
Betsy Price
Nonpartisan

The 2019 Fort Worth mayoral election took place on May 4, 2019, to elect the mayor of Fort Worth, Texas. The election was officially non-partisan.

Betsy Price, who was serving her fourth term, ran for reelection. Deborah Peoples, the chair of the Tarrant County Democratic Party, ran as a challenger.

Price handily won re-election with just under 56% of the vote. She won a record fifth term as mayor of Fort Worth.

== Results ==
Fort Worth mayoral election, 2019
Party	Candidate	Votes	%
Nonpartisan	Betsy Price (Incumbent)	21,596	55.7
Nonpartisan	Deborah Peoples	16,218	41.8
Nonpartisan	James H. McBride	872	2.2
Nonpartisan	Mike Haynes (write-in)	35	0.1
Total votes		38,721	100
