= John Thomas Brown (politician) =

American politician (1857–1942)

4th Mayor of Fort Worth, TX
- In office 12 April 1880 - 11 April 1882
- Preceded by: Robert Emmett Beckham
- Succeeded by: John Peter Smith

Personal details
- Born: 1857 Mississippi, U.S.
- Died: 1942 (aged 84–85) Fort Worth, Texas, U.S.
- Profession: Mayor

John Thomas Brown (1857–1942) was an American politician. He was the fourth mayor of Fort Worth, Texas, from 12 April 1880 – 11 April 1882.
