= Beckham =

Beckham most commonly refers to:

- Beckham (surname), a surname (and list of people with that name)
  - David Beckham (born 1975), English former professional footballer
  - Odell Beckham Jr. (born 1992), American football player

Beckham may also refer to:

== Places ==
- Beckham, Virginia, US, an unincorporated community
- East Beckham, Norfolk, England
- West Beckham, Norfolk, England
- Beckham County, Kentucky, US
- Beckham County, Oklahoma, US

== Other ==
- Beckham, a British documentary series about David Beckham
- Bend It Like Beckham, a British sports comedy film
- Beckham rule, a rule in Major League Soccer in the United States and Canada, allowing each team to sign one player outside of the league's salary cap

== See also ==
- Beckingham Palace (Rowneybury House), a play on Victoria and David Beckham's name
- Posh and Becks, a widely used nickname for Victoria and David Beckham
- Bechem (disambiguation)
