= Giles Hiram Day =

American politician (1839–1909)

2nd Mayor of Fort Worth, TX
- In office November 10, 1874 - August 8, 1878
- Preceded by: Giles Hiram Day
- Succeeded by: Robert Emmett Beckham

Personal details
- Born: September 18, 1839; Vermont, U.S.
- Died: October 29, 1909 (aged 70); Fort Worth, Texas, U.S.
- Profession: Mayor

Giles Hiram Day (September 18, 1839 – October 29, 1909) was an American politician.

== Career ==
Day was born on September 18, 1839, in Vermont, to Hiram Benjamin Day and Elizabeth Brown.

He served as the second mayor of Fort Worth, Texas between November 10, 1874 – August 8, 1878.

Day died on October 29, 1909, and is buried at the Oakwood Cemetery.
