= Oakwood Cemetery (Fort Worth, Texas) =

Historic cemetery in Fort Worth, Texas

- Oakwood Cemetery Historic District
- U.S. National Register of Historic Places
- U.S. Historic district
- Recorded Texas Historic Landmark
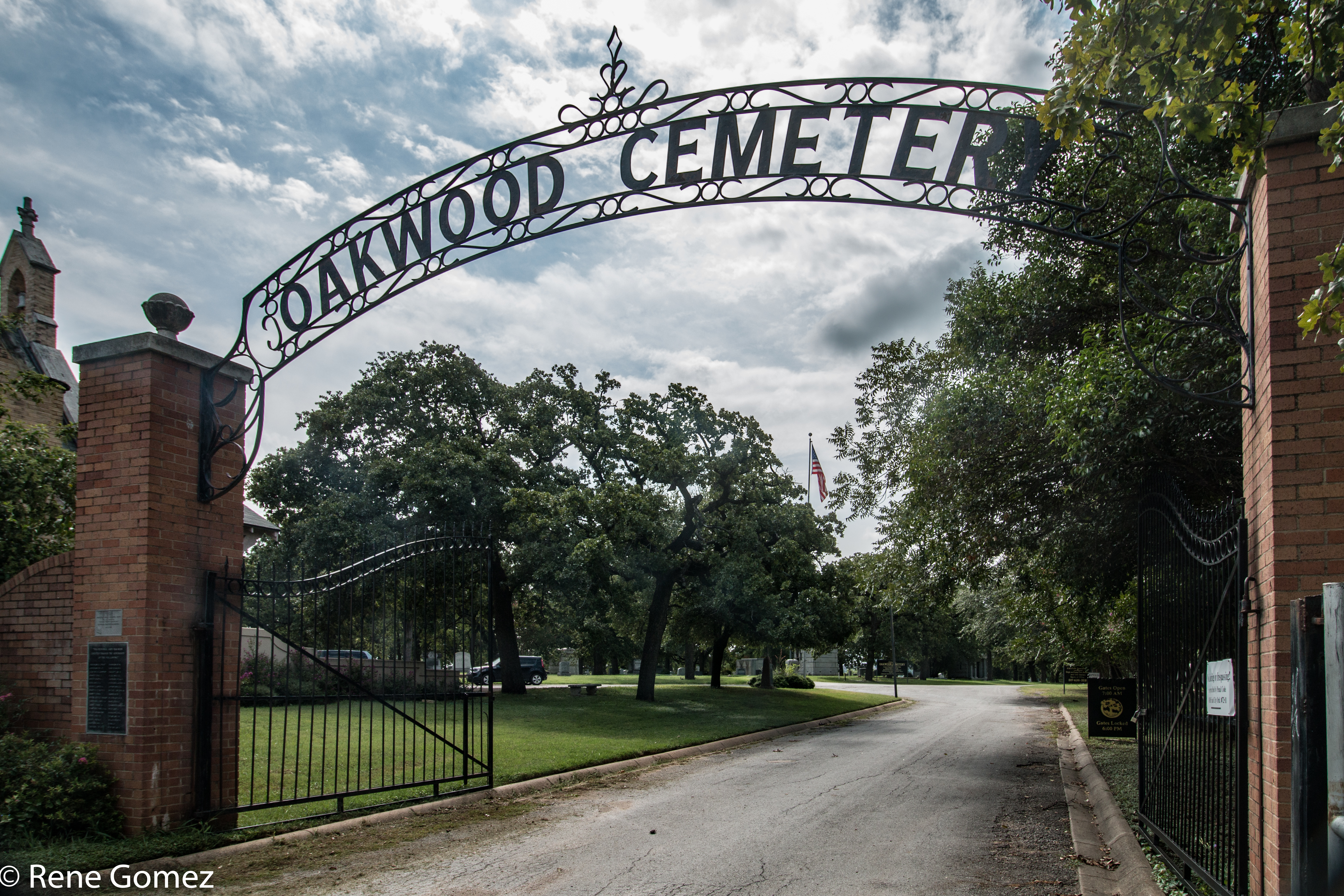
- Entrance to Oakwood Cemetery in 2017

- Location within Texas Location within the United States
- Location: 701 Grand Avenue; Fort Worth, Texas
- Coordinates: 32°46′10″N 97°20′50″W
- Area: 63.726 acres (25.789 ha)
- Built: 1879
- Built by: J.W. McPherson, Fort Worth Granite and Marble Company
- Architect: Waller & Field, unknown
- Architectural style: Late Gothic Revival
- NRHP reference No.: 100002473
- RTHL No.: 3659

Significant dates
- Added to NRHP: 29 May 2018
- Designated RTHL: 1966

Oakwood Cemetery is a historic cemetery in the city of Fort Worth, Texas. Deeded to the city in 1879, it is the burial place of prominent local citizens, pioneers, politicians, and performers.

Located at 701 Grand Avenue, Oakwood is a 62-acre cemetery on the north side of the Trinity River, just across the river from downtown Fort Worth.

The cemetery is actually composed of three historically distinct cemeteries divided along racial and religious lines: New City Cemetery, the oldest section historically limited to white burials; Trinity Cemetery, designated for African-American burials; and Calvary Cemetery, a section specifically for Catholic burials.

The cemetery was designated a historic district on the National Register of Historic Places in 2018 and a Recorded Texas Historic Landmark in 1966. One grave site within the cemetery is also designated separately as a Recorded Texas Historic Landmark since 1983.

== History ==
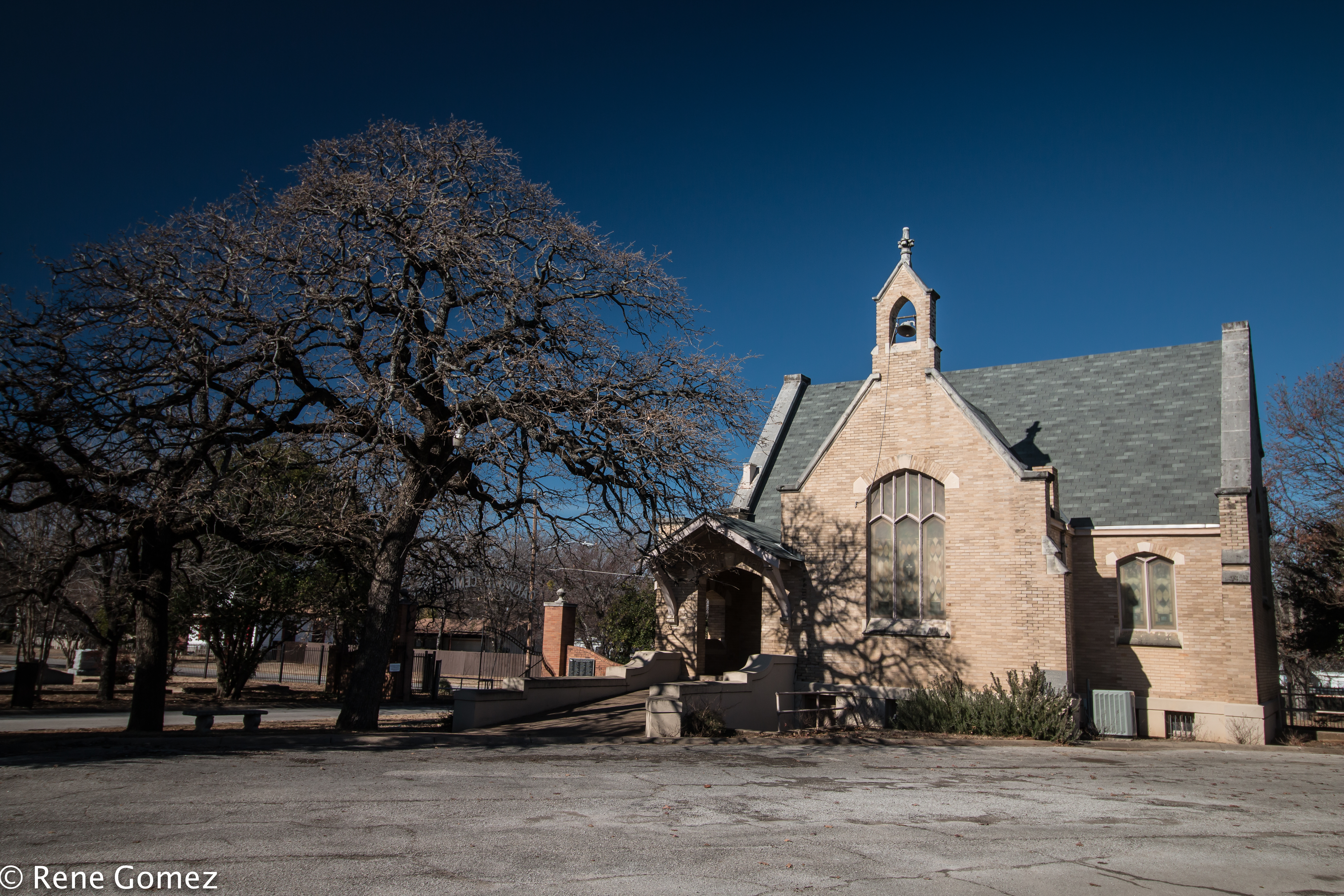
Oakwood Cemetery Chapel

The original 20 acres that form the City Cemetery were deeded to the City of Fort Worth by local civic leader John Peter Smith in 1879, after the city's oldest cemetery, Pioneers Rest, had rapidly filled. In 1880, a section of the property was partitioned off and limited to Catholic burials at the request of Bishop C.W. Dubois of Galveston. This new Catholic section was named Calvary Cemetery.

The Oakwood Cemetery Association formed in 1908 and a chapel was built on the north end of the property in 1912. In 1926 a new Oakwood Cemetery Association charter was instated requiring a five-member board of directors. The president of the Fort Worth National Bank, the institution that held the association's funds in trust, was required to be a director; of the remaining four members, two had to be women. Among the first board members were Jennie Scott Scheuber, a local civic leader and the city's first librarian, and K. M. Van Zandt, longtime president of the Fort Worth National Bank. In 1952, the charter was amended to allow board representation from any bank in Fort Worth with oversight of the association's endowment.

== Notable graves and monuments ==
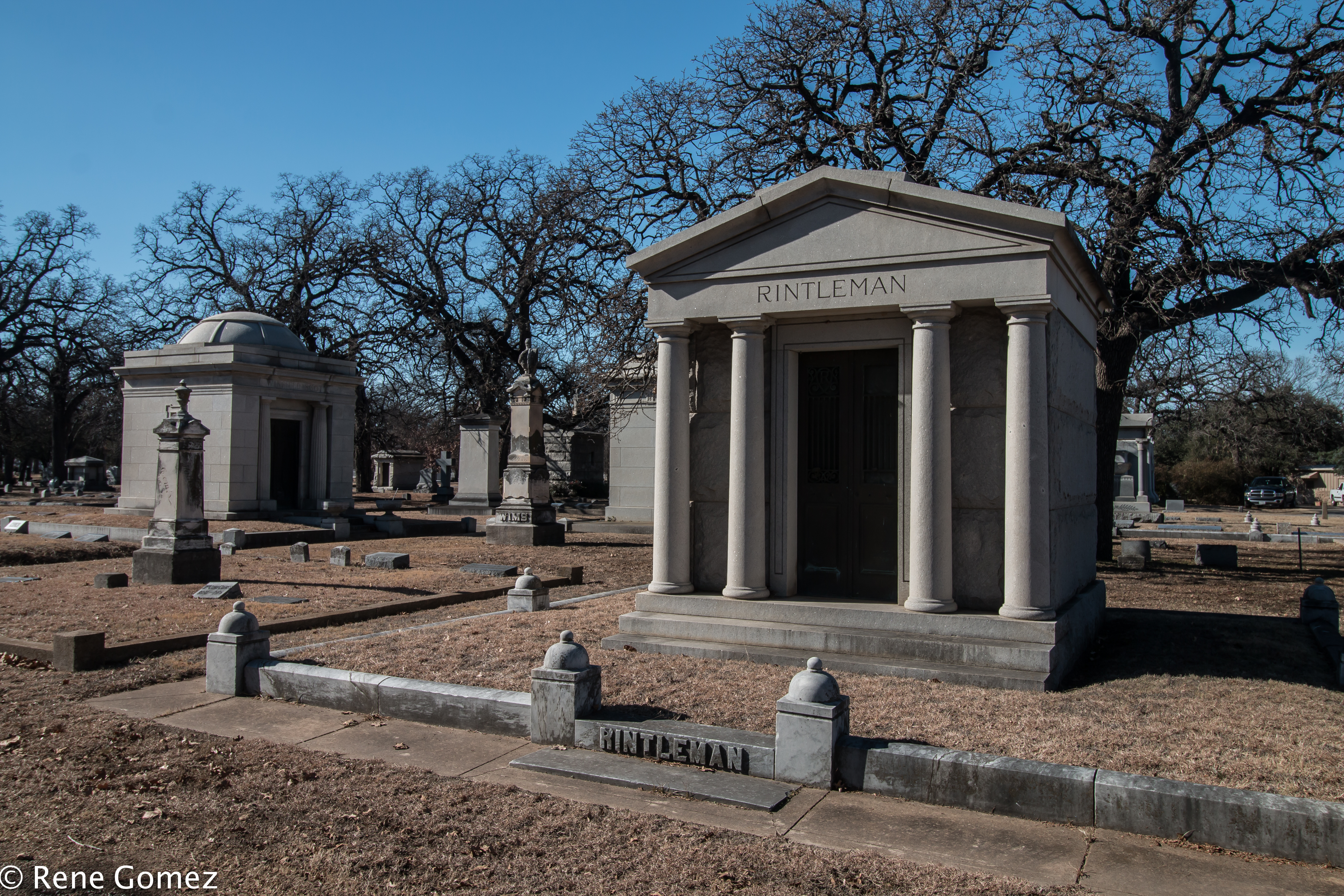
Mausoleums at Oakwood Cemetery

Oakwood Cemetery is home to Bartenders' Row, a section of graves belonging to bartenders from Fort Worth's notorious Hell's Half Acre, and Bricklayers' Row, a section formerly reserved for members of the local bricklayers' union. In 1903, Fort Worth mayor T.J. Powell designated a section of the cemetery, known as Soldiers' Row, for the burial of Confederate Civil War veterans and their wives.

Notable local individuals interred at Oakwood Cemetery include:

- Adrienne Ames (1907–1947), actress
- Charles Keith Bell (1853–1913), member of the United States House of Representatives
- Euday Louis Bowman (1887–1949), musician and ragtime composer
- Samuel Burk Burnett (1849–1922), cattleman and owner of the 6666 Ranch
- Mary Couts Burnett (1856–1924), philanthropist and donor to Texas Christian University
- William Paxton Burts, first mayor of Fort Worth
- Horace J. Carswell, Jr. (1916–1944), U.S. Army major and namesake of the former Carswell Air Force Base
- Jim Courtwright (1848–1887), Fort Worth sheriff killed in gun battle with Luke Short
- Charles Allen Culberson (1855–1925), Texas governor and U.S. Senator
- Elisha Adam Euless (1848–1911), founder and namesake of the city of Euless, Texas
- Al Hayne (1850–1890), British civil engineer who perished rescuing women & children from the Texas Spring Palace fire
- Gladys McClure (1914–1933), actress and sister of Adrienne Ames
- William Madison "Gooseneck Bill" McDonald (1866–1950), African-American politician and businessman
- Jim Miller (1861–1909), outlaw and assassin
- Joe Pate (1892–1948), professional baseball player
- Jennie Scott Scheuber (1860–1944), notable librarian and civic leader
- Luke Short (1854–1893), cowboy, gunfighter, and saloon owner
- John Bunyan Slaughter (1848–1928), rancher
- John Peter Smith (1831–1901), civic leader and six-term mayor of Fort Worth and namesake of John Peter Smith Hospital
- K. M. Van Zandt (1836–1930), businessman and politician
- Electra Waggoner (1882–1925), rancher, heiress, and socialite
- William Thomas Waggoner (1852–1934), rancher and oilman
- Thomas Neville Waul (1813–1903), Confederate Army brigadier general; the grave is designated Recorded Texas Historic Landmark #2142

In December 2017, the 1,100-year-old remains of a Native American woman found by construction workers digging a trench in downtown Fort Worth were buried at Oakwood Cemetery in accordance with NAGPRA requirements; burial rites were performed by local Native American spiritual leaders.

== See also ==
- National Register of Historic Places listings in Tarrant County, Texas
- Recorded Texas Historic Landmarks in Tarrant County
