= Bechem (disambiguation) =

Bechem is a town in Ghana

Bechem may also refer to:

- Bechem United F.C., a Ghanaian football club
- Berekum Chelsea F.C., a Ghanaian football club formerly known as Bechem Chelsea Football Club
- Günther Bechem, (1921 – 2011) was a racing driver from Germany

== See also ==
- Beckham (disambiguation)
