= JPS Health Network =

Hospital district in Tarrant County, Texas

JPS Health Network logo

The Tarrant County Hospital District (TCHD) does business as the JPS Health Network. It is located in the taxpayer-supported hospital district of Tarrant County, Texas. Headquarters are in the John Peter Smith Hospital at 1500 South Main Street, Fort Worth, Texas, 76104.

== About JPS Health Network ==
The origins of JPS Health Network go back to October 1877. Future Fort Worth mayor, John Peter Smith, deeded five acres of land for medical facilities for indigent patients in Fort Worth and Tarrant County. JPS is a teaching facility. It is the site of the nation's largest hospital-based Family Medicine residency program.

JPS Health Network operates John Peter Smith Hospital, which is a 573-bed acute care facility in Fort Worth, Texas.

John Peter Smith Hospital provides emergency services and Level 1 trauma care. The hospital is the only psychiatric emergency services site in Tarrant County. More than 5,000 babies are born each year at John Peter Smith Hospital.

JPS is a certified Chest Pain Center, Certified Primary Stroke Center and an Accredited American College of Surgeons Cancer Center. It is Joint Commission Disease Specific Certified in Sepsis and Geriatrics. JPS has a Level lll Neonatal Intensive Care Center (NICU).

== Academics ==
JPS is a teaching site and trains physicians, nurses, physician assistants and other health care workers. JPS supports nine residency programs. The Family Medicine residency is the largest hospital-based family medicine residency program in the nation.

== Leadership ==
The JPS Board of Managers includes 11 members. They are appointed by the Tarrant County Commissioners. This committee manages the JPS Health Network facilities and leadership.

== Health centers ==
The network includes more than 40 community-based health centers, including 20 clinics based on school campuses.

== See also ==
- Harris Health System (former Harris County Hospital District)
- Parkland Health & Hospital System (Dallas County)
