= Robert Emmett Beckham =

American physician and politician (1844–1910)

3rd Mayor of Fort Worth, TX
- In office August 8, 1878 – April 12, 1880
- Preceded by: Giles Hiram Day
- Succeeded by: John T. Brown

Personal details
- Born: April 13, 1844; Murray, Kentucky, U.S.
- Died: June 9, 1910 (aged 66); Fort Worth, Texas, U.S.
- Profession: Mayor

Robert Emmett Beckham (April 13, 1844 – June 9, 1910) was an American lawyer and politician.

== Career ==
Beckham was born on April 13, 1844, in Murray, Kentucky, to Pleasant H. Brown and Sarah Francis Churchill. During the American Civil War, he served in Company F, First Kentucky Infantry Regiment in the Confederate States Army. He was captured and exchanged in Vicksburg during December 1862.

In 1878, he was elected mayor of Fort Worth, Texas, he served until April 12, 1880. He was then elected county judge, holding that office two terms.

Beckham died on June 9, 1910, and is buried at the Oakwood Cemetery.
