= List of mayors of Fort Worth, Texas =

Mayor of Fort Worth, Texas
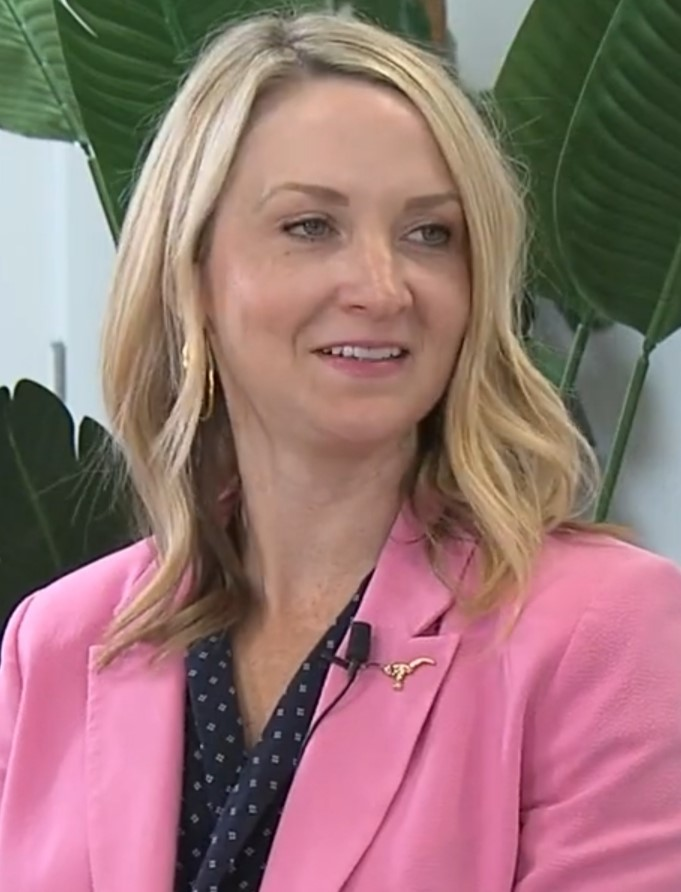
- Incumbent; Mattie Parker since June 15, 2021
- Type: Mayor
- Formation: February 17, 1873
- First holder: William Paxton Burts

This is a list of mayors of Fort Worth, Texas.

== List of mayors ==
No.	Mayor	Took office	Left office	Tenure	Party	Election
1	William Paxton Burts (1827–1895)	February 17, 1873	October 29, 1874 (Note: Burts resigned due to controversy over debt handling and a city deficit.)	1 year, 254 days	Unknown	TBA
Unknown		October 29, 1874	November 10, 1874			
2	Giles Hiram Day (1839–1909)	November 10, 1874	August 8, 1878	3 years, 271 days	Unknown	TBA
3	Robert Emmett Beckham (1844–1910)	August 8, 1878	April 12, 1880	1 year, 248 days	Unknown	TBA
4	John Thomas Brown (1857–1942)	April 12, 1880	April 11, 1882	1 year, 364 days	Unknown	TBA
5	John Peter Smith (1831–1901); 1st time	April 11, 1882	April 20, 1886	4 years, 9 days	Unknown	TBA
6	H. S. Broiles (1845–1913)	April 20, 1886	April 8, 1890	3 years, 353 days	Unknown	1886
6	H. S. Broiles (1845–1913)	April 20, 1886	April 8, 1890	3 years, 353 days	Unknown	1888
7	William Smartt Pendleton (TBA–TBA)	April 8, 1890	August 5, 1890	119 days	Democratic	1890
8	John Peter Smith (1831–1901); 2nd time	August 5, 1890	April 12, 1892	1 year, 251 days	Unknown	TBA
9	Buckley Burton Paddock (TBA–TBA)	April 12, 1892	April 10, 1900	7 years, 363 days	Unknown	TBA
10	T. J. Powell (TBA–TBA)	April 10, 1900	April 10, 1906	6 years, 0 days	Democratic	TBA
11	William Dawson Harris (TBA–TBA)	April 10, 1906	April 13, 1909	3 years, 3 days	Unknown	TBA
12	William David Williams (TBA–TBA)	April 13, 1909	April 27, 1909 (Note: Williams resigned to accept appointment to the Texas Railroad Commission.)	14 days	Unknown	TBA
Unknown		April 27, 1909	June 1, 1909			
13	William D. Davis (1867–1942); 1st time	June 1, 1909	April 15, 1913	3 years, 318 days	Democratic	May 1909
13	William D. Davis (1867–1942); 1st time	June 1, 1909	April 15, 1913	3 years, 318 days	Democratic	1911
14	Robert Fain Milam (TBA–TBA)	April 15, 1913	April 15, 1915	2 years, 0 days	Democratic	1913
15	E. T. Tyra (TBA–TBA)	April 16, 1915	April 16, 1917	2 years, 0 days	Unknown	1915
16	William D. Davis (1867–1942); 2nd time	April 16, 1917	April 16, 1921	4 years, 0 days	Democratic	1917
16	William D. Davis (1867–1942); 2nd time	April 16, 1917	April 16, 1921	4 years, 0 days	Democratic	1919
17	E. R. Cockrell (TBA–TBA)	April 16, 1921	October 8, 1924	3 years, 175 days	Democratic	TBA
18	W. P. Burton (TBA–TBA)	October 8, 1924	April 15, 1925	189 days	Unknown	TBA
19	Henry Clay Meacham (TBA–TBA)	April 15, 1925	April 12, 1927	1 year, 362 days	Unknown	TBA
20	William J. Bryce (1861–1944)	April 12, 1927	December 20, 1933 (Note: Bryce resigned due to his wife's failing health.)	6 years, 252 days	Unknown	TBA
21	Van Zandt Jarvis (TBA–TBA)	December 20, 1933	April 7, 1937	3 years, 108 days	Unknown	TBA
22	W. J. Hammond (TBA–TBA)	April 8, 1937	May 11, 1938	1 year, 33 days	Unknown	TBA
23	R. H. W. Drechsel (TBA–TBA)	May 11, 1938	July 27, 1938	77 days	Unknown	TBA
24	T. J. Harrell (TBA–TBA)	July 27, 1938	June 19, 1940	1 year, 328 days	Unknown	TBA
Unknown		June 19, 1940	July 17, 1940			
25	I. N. McCrary (TBA–TBA)	July 17, 1940	April 4, 1945	4 years, 261 days	Unknown	TBA
26	Roscoe L. Carnrike (TBA–TBA)	April 4, 1945	April 8, 1947	2 years, 4 days	Unknown	TBA
27	F. Edgar Deen (TBA–TBA); 1st time	April 9, 1947	April 6, 1951	3 years, 362 days	Unknown	TBA
28	J. R. Edwards (TBA–TBA)	April 6, 1951	April 22, 1953	2 years, 16 days	Unknown	TBA
29	F. Edgar Deen (TBA–TBA); 2nd time	April 22, 1953	April 6, 1955	1 year, 349 days	Unknown	TBA
Unknown		April 6, 1955	April 20, 1955			
30	F. E. Garrison (TBA–TBA)	April 20, 1955	April 2, 1957	1 year, 347 days	Unknown	TBA
31	Thomas A. McCann (TBA–TBA)	April 2, 1957	April 21, 1961	4 years, 19 days	Unknown	TBA
32	John S. Justin Jr. (TBA–TBA)	April 21, 1961	April 22, 1963	2 years, 1 day	Unknown	TBA
33	Bayard H. Friedman (TBA–TBA)	April 22, 1963	April 6, 1965	1 year, 349 days	Unknown	TBA
34	Willard Barr (TBA–TBA)	April 6, 1965	April 6, 1967	2 years, 0 days	Unknown	TBA
35	DeWitt McKinley (TBA–TBA)	April 6, 1967	April 9, 1969 (Note: Dates given by Fort Worth Mayor's office.)	2 years, 3 days	Unknown	TBA
36	R. M. Stovall (TBA–TBA)	April 6, 1969	April 14, 1975	6 years, 8 days	Unknown	TBA
37	Clif Overcash (TBA–TBA)	April 14, 1975	April 5, 1977	1 year, 356 days	Unknown	TBA
38	Hugh Parmer (1939–2020)	April 5, 1977	May 1, 1979	2 years, 26 days	Democratic	TBA
39	Woodie Woods (TBA–TBA)	May 1, 1979	November 10, 1981	2 years, 193 days	Republican	TBA
–	Richard Newkirk (TBA–TBA); Interim	November 11, 1981	February 1, 1982	82 days	Unknown	–
40	Bob Bolen (1926–2014)	February 2, 1982	May 21, 1991 (Note: Bolen retired to serve as an advisor to the chancellor of Texas Christian University.)	9 years, 108 days	Republican	TBA
41	Kay Granger (1943–2026)	May 21, 1991	December 19, 1995 (Note: Granger left office to campaign for Texas's 12th congressional district.)	4 years, 212 days	Republican	TBA
–	Jewel Woods (TBA–TBA); Interim	December 20, 1995	May 20, 1996	152 days	Unknown	–
42	Kenneth Barr (TBA–TBA)	May 21, 1996	May 20, 2003	6 years, 364 days	Democratic	TBA
43	Mike Moncrief (born 1943)	May 20, 2003	July 12, 2011	8 years, 53 days	Democratic	2003
43	Mike Moncrief (born 1943)	May 20, 2003	July 12, 2011	8 years, 53 days	Democratic	2005
43	Mike Moncrief (born 1943)	May 20, 2003	July 12, 2011	8 years, 53 days	Democratic	2007
43	Mike Moncrief (born 1943)	May 20, 2003	July 12, 2011	8 years, 53 days	Democratic	2009
44	Betsy Price (born 1949)	July 12, 2011	June 15, 2021	9 years, 338 days	Republican	2011
44	Betsy Price (born 1949)	July 12, 2011	June 15, 2021	9 years, 338 days	Republican	2013
44	Betsy Price (born 1949)	July 12, 2011	June 15, 2021	9 years, 338 days	Republican	2015
44	Betsy Price (born 1949)	July 12, 2011	June 15, 2021	9 years, 338 days	Republican	2017
44	Betsy Price (born 1949)	July 12, 2011	June 15, 2021	9 years, 338 days	Republican	2019
45	Mattie Parker (born 1983)	June 15, 2021	Incumbent	5 years, 84 days	Republican	2021
45	Mattie Parker (born 1983)	June 15, 2021	Incumbent	5 years, 84 days	Republican	2023
45	Mattie Parker (born 1983)	June 15, 2021	Incumbent	5 years, 84 days	Republican	2025
