= Kent Brantly =

American doctor

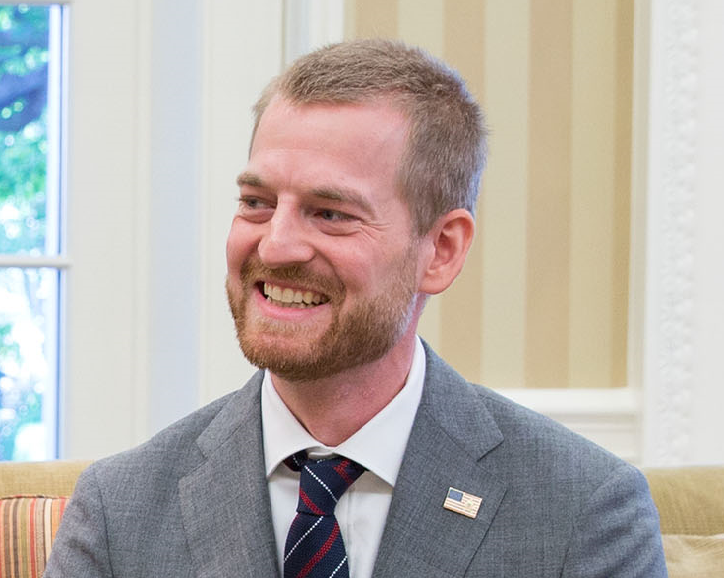
- Brantly visiting the White House, September 16, 2014
- Born: Indianapolis, Indiana
- Education: Abilene Christian University; Indiana University – Purdue University Indianapolis
- Occupations: Physician, author, speaker
- Years active: 2009-present
- Known for: Treating, contracting, and surviving Ebola virus disease
- Spouse: Amber Brantly
- Children: 2
- Medical career
- Profession: Medical missionary
- Field: Medicine
- Institutions: Samaritan's Purse
- Awards: Time Person of the Year

Kent Brantly is an American doctor with the medical mission group Samaritan's Purse. While treating Ebola patients in Liberia, he contracted the virus. He became the first American to return to the United States to be treated for the disease.

== Life ==
Brantly was born in Indianapolis, the youngest of six children to Jim and Jan Brantly. He is married to Amber Brantly, and they have two children.

Brantly attended Abilene Christian University in Texas, where he earned an undergraduate degree in biblical text in 2003. It was here, at ACU, where he pledged Pi Kappa, a men's social club founded on a deep sense of Christian brotherhood, regardless of which denomination that member belonged to. After leaving ACU, he earned his medical degree from Indiana University School of Medicine (within Indiana University – Purdue University Indianapolis) in 2009 and completed his family medicine residency and fellowship in maternal child health at John Peter Smith Hospital in Fort Worth, Texas.

Brantly and his wife served as medical missionaries in Monrovia, Liberia, with World Medical Mission, the medical arm of Samaritan's Purse. After contracting the Ebola virus in summer 2014, he was evacuated to Emory University Hospital in Atlanta, Georgia, where he recovered and was later reunited with his family. He now serves as the medical missions advisor for Samaritan's Purse and lives with his family in Texas.

Brantly's first public speaking engagement after his release from Emory hospital was on October 10, 2014, at his alma mater, Abilene Christian University. In September 2014, he testified at a joint Senate hearing on the Ebola crisis in West Africa and met privately with President Barack Obama at the White House. That month he donated his plasma three times to American Ebola patients.

In 2014, he, along with other medical professionals involved in treating Ebola patients, became Time magazine's Person of the Year.

In 2015 Brantly gave the invocation at the National Prayer Breakfast attended by President Obama and First Lady Michelle Obama.

On July 21, 2015, the Brantlys released a book written with biographer David Thomas titled Called for Life: How Loving Our Neighbor Led Us Into the Heart of the Ebola Epidemic published by WaterBrook Press.

After surviving Ebola, Brantly made the decision to return to Africa for medical missions in 2019. Brantly gave a brief statement of why he decided to return despite his near-death situation of contracting Ebola. Brantly stated:

“It’s been five years of emotional healing and spiritual healing and growth,” the doctor, 38, told The Christian Chronicle in an interview at the Southside Church of Christ in Fort Worth, his family’s home congregation for much of the last decade. “I think we’ve grown and been equipped in ways during this five years that we were not before we went to Liberia.”
