= 2003 Fort Worth mayoral election =

Fort Worth mayoral election, 2003
- May 3, 2003
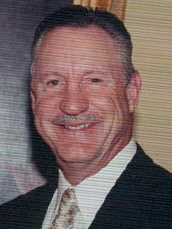

Candidate	Mike Moncrief	Cathy Hirt
Party	nonpartisan candidate	nonpartisan candidate
Popular vote	23,965	13,604
Percentage	61.23%	34.76%
Mayor before election
Kenneth Barr
Democratic
Elected mayor
Mike Moncrief
Democratic

The 2003 Fort Worth mayoral election took place on May 3, 2003, to elect the Mayor of Fort Worth, Texas. The election was held concurrently with various other local elections, and was officially nonpartisan. The election saw the election of Mike Moncrief.

The mayoral term in Fort Worth is two years.

If no candidate received a majority of the vote in the general election, a runoff would have been held.

== General election ==
=== Results ===
Results
Party	Candidate	Votes	%
Nonpartisan	Mike Moncrief	23,965	61.23
Nonpartisan	Cathy Hirt	13,604	34.76
Nonpartisan	Marilyn Hodge	482	1.23
Nonpartisan	Elliot Goldman	455	1.16
Nonpartisan	Joseph Sandoval	341	0.87
Nonpartisan	Andrew B. Hill	207	0.53
Nonpartisan	George Host	84	0.21
Total votes		39,447	
