= Joseph Beckham =

American academic administrator

- Born: January 1, 1945 (age 81)
- Education: University of Florida
- Known for: Ross Oglesby Award for contributions to FSU

Joseph C. Beckham (born January 1, 1945) is Professor Emeritus Florida State University. He served on the faculty at FSU for thirty-five years beginning in 1980, chaired the Department of Educational Leadership and Policy Studies on three occasions, and was named Allen Tucker Professor of Higher Education during his tenure at the Institution. Beckham served a term as president of the National Organization on Legal Problems of Education in 1989. In 1991, he was awarded the McGhehey Award for contributions to the field of education law by the Education Law Association. He received teaching awards throughout his tenure at FSU, including the Graduate Faculty Mentor Award in 2011, and was recognized by Florida Gold Key with the Ross Oglesby Award for contributions to the university in 1999. He was the Faculty Athletic Representative to the ACC and NCAA for Florida State University from 2005 to 2011.

Prior to his position at FSU, he was administrative counsel to Connecticut Lieutenant Governor Peter Cashman and executive director of a comprehensive educational program for youthful offenders established jointly through the Connecticut Council on Human Services and the Law Enforcement Assistance Administration. Early in his career, he instructed courses for the North Carolina Outward Bound School, Hurricane Island Outward Bound and Minnesota Outward Bound. He also developed adaptive Outward Bound programs, notably the Connecticut Wilderness School (1974) and Project Bold (1970) (U.S.Dependent Schools Europe).

Beckham has been active in promoting outdoor education programs and greenways in Trails in the State of Florida. He was part of a citizen's group that successfully lobbied and helped establish Florida's first Rail-Trail, the St. Marks Trail, was President of the Florida Greenways and Trails Foundation during the build-out of the Coast-to-Coast Trail in the period from 2013 to 2015. He has also served on the boards of several youth development non-profits, including the Boys and Girls Clubs of the Big Bend.

== Education ==
- Juris Doctor from the University of Florida in 1969.
- Doctorate of Philosophy in Educational Leadership and Policy (higher education) from University of Florida in 1977.
