= Norm Beckham =

Australian rules footballer, born 1903

Personal information
- Full name: Norman Beckham
- Born: 2 May 1903
- Died: 30 April 1983 (aged 79)
- Original team: Millgrove

Playing career^{1}
Years	Club	Games (Goals)
1929	Fitzroy	3 (0)
- ^{1} Playing statistics correct to the end of 1929.

Norm Beckham (2 May 1903 – 30 April 1983) was an Australian rules footballer who played with Fitzroy in the Victorian Football League (VFL).
