= West Hill Cemetery =

West Hill Cemetery may refer to:

- West Hill Cemetery, Sherburne, a cemetery in the town of Sherburne, Chenango County, New York, United States
- West Hill Cemetery, Winchester, a cemetery in the city of Winchester, Hampshire, United Kingdom
