= Terron Beckham =

American content creator (born 1992)

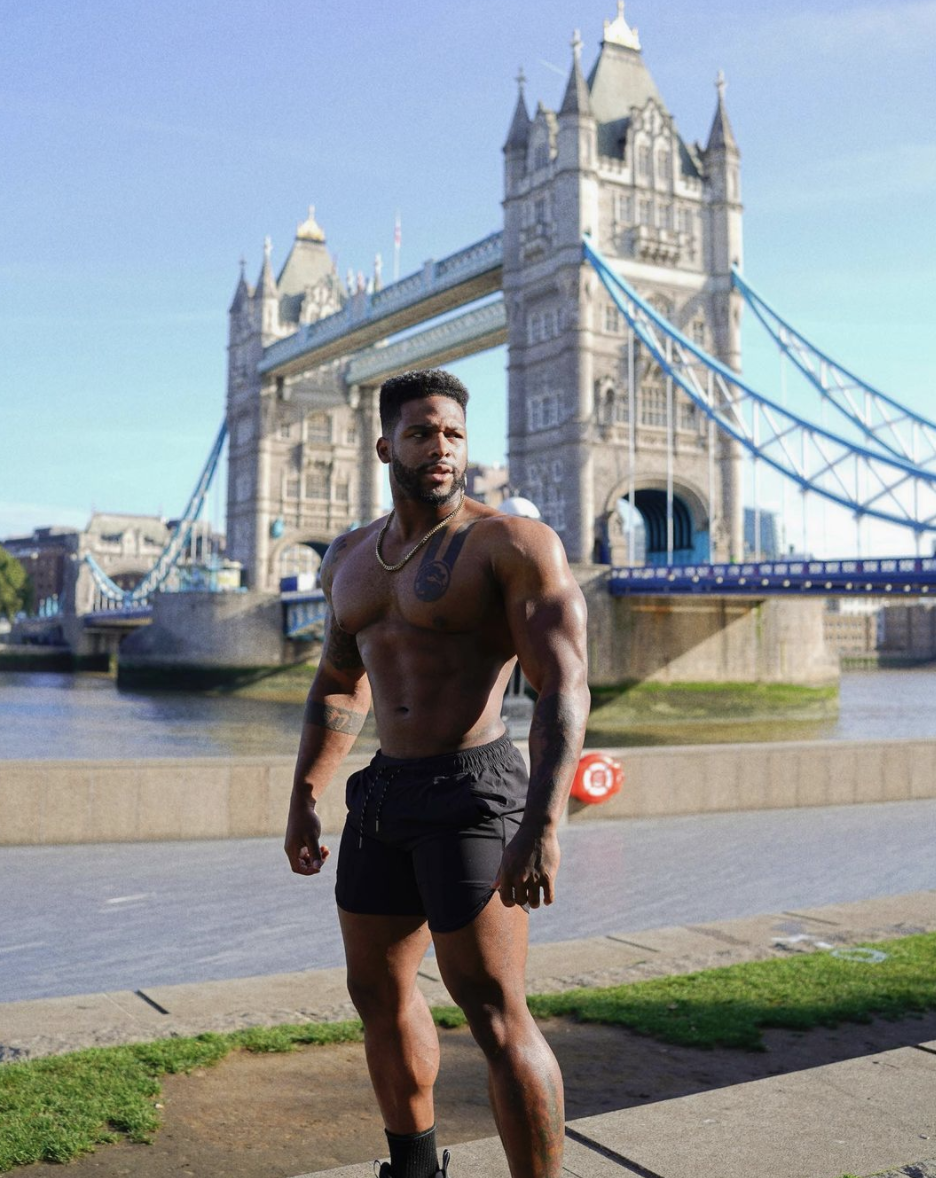
- Born: July 28, 1992 (age 34); Dallas, Texas
- Parent(s): Terry Beckham, Jerri Fondren

Twitch information
- Channel: fbaftermathtv
- Genre: Gaming
- Games: Fighting and First Person Shooter Games
- Followers: 20 thousand

YouTube information
- Channels: FBAFTERMATH; Terron Beckham
- Genres: Fitness & Vlogging
- Subscribers: 359 thousand
- Views: 50.8 million
- Last updated: 2 November 2023

Terron Beckham (born July 28, 1992) is an American content creator, Twitch streamer, YouTuber, fitness model, and professional wrestler. He played college football at Stevenson University. He is the cousin of NFL star wide receiver Odell Beckham Jr.

== Early years ==
Terron Beckham was born on July 28, 1992, in Dallas, Texas. He attended Richardson High School in Richardson, Texas for the first three years of high school where he played football, basketball, and track & field. He played running back, defensive end, linebacker, and safety for the Richardson Eagles football team. Coming into his senior year Terron transferred and finished high school at Fort Meade High School in Fort Meade, Maryland. He was the starting running back for the Meade High Mustangs and rushed for 1,300 yards and scored 17 touchdowns throughout his tenure.

After high school, Beckham attended Stevenson University in Baltimore, Maryland but elected to drop out of college due to financial matters and had to work a job at GameStop to pay off his loans. He then attended Navarro College in Corsicana, Texas and had a stint at the Tyler Junior College in Tyler, Texas but never really found his place at any of these schools.

To stay fit during his journey to find a college to play football he started bodybuilding and became a fitness model and started participating in competitions like Mr. Olympia Fitness and Performance Expo.

== Pro football career ==
Kevin Dunn, the CEO of Test Football Academy, invited Beckham to get ready for the NFL draft, as Dunn saw Beckham's ability to play football.

Height	Weight	40- yard dash	20- yard shuttle	Three- cone drill	Vertical jump	Broad jump	Bench press
5 ft 11 in (1.80 m)	223 lbs (101.2 kg)	4.47 s	4.18 s	6.8 s	44.5 in (1.13 m)	10 ft 8 in (3.25 m)	36 reps
All values from Pro TEST Football Academy

In 2016, Beckham was signed to a rookie mini-camp deal with the New York Jets which was one of the teams who scouted him during his pro day. He also had a private workout with the Indianapolis Colts. Nothing really materialized from these workouts and Beckham has yet to make an NFL roster.

== High school career ==
Beckham was a three-sport athlete, playing American football and basketball and competing in track and field at Richardson High School in Dallas County, Texas. However, he transferred to Fort Meade High School in Fort Meade, Maryland for his senior year and focused his final season on American football. His parents were struggling with finances after splitting up; feeling like a burden to his parents, he moved in with this uncle and aunt. As an American football running back in his final season, he ran for over 1300 yards and scored 17 touchdowns.

Despite his high level of performance, he got little attention from college programs. As a three-sport athlete for three years, Beckham didn't spend an entire season as a running back for most of high school, and he lacked experience compared to other more sought-after recruits. As a result, he was not the preferred athlete for college scouts. Furthermore, the colleges that expressed interest in him early in high school - predominantly the Texas colleges - were not given much thought by Beckham as he focused on the upcoming basketball and track seasons. Beckham was unaware of the recruitment process, stating that "[he] wasn't big into football outside of what [he] did on the field", and that "[he] didn't pay attention much to the big schools". Major colleges have rolling admissions, filling up classes early. With Beckham getting a late start on the recruitment process, he lost the opportunity to join the schools that had previously shown interest in him early on, and not many schools could offer him a spot on their team's roster.

== College career ==
Beckham decided to attend Stevenson University in Owings, Maryland, which offered a newly formed Division III American football program. However, his time at the university was short-lived; Beckham left Stevenson University after the first semester due to financial struggles. Unlike Division I and Division II athletes, Division III athletes aren't given scholarships for living expenses and tuition, which he was unaware of at the time. He decided to give up on football to work a job and pay for housing.

After working at a local GameStop, Beckham decided to continue pursuing American football by attending Navarro College, a community college in Corsicana, Texas. The American football program at Navarro College competes in the Southwest Junior College Conference of the National Junior College Athletic Association (NJCAA). However, he encountered financial difficulties again and left the program to work a job.

Beckham enrolled at Tyler Junior College, a community college in Tyler, Texas. The American football program at Tyler Junior College competes in the Southwest Junior College Conference of the National Junior College Athletic Association (NJCAA), similar to Navarro College. Unlike the previous times, Beckham had financial support here as a family friend covered school expenses. However, with incoming recruits already selected and limited spots available for walk-ons, Beckham had to try out for the team. When running a 40-yard dash, Beckham pulled a hip muscle, rendering his season over before it even started.

== Fitness career ==
After his unsuccessful college American football career, Beckham moved to New York City and ventured into the fitness industry at 21 years old. While his muscular and lean physique landed him fitness modeling gigs, he primarily worked as a personal trainer. He created Aftermath Fitness, a fitness company selling workout and nutrition plans for specific fitness goals, such as gaining muscle or losing fat.

=== Controversies ===
Beckham's physique has become a contentious topic in the fitness industry, with many questioning his use of anabolic steroids and performance-enhancing drugs (PEDs). He has denied using substances to attain his muscular physique and athleticism, instead attributing them to his genetics and strong work ethic.

== New York Jets tryout ==
In September 2015, when he was 23 years old, Beckham went to the Mr. Olympia Fitness and Performance Expo in Las Vegas. Beckham took part in a vertical jump contest at the exhibition, jumping 44 inches off the floor. Kevin Dunn, the CEO and owner of TEST Football Academy, saw Beckham's athleticism and, in awe, decided to put Beckham through a private workout at the TEST facility in Martinsville, New Jersey. After a successful workout, Dunn offered Beckham a spot on the 2016 class of prospects. Here, Beckham worked on his hip and hamstring flexibility to get him back into football shape.

In April 2016, Beckham showcased his skills and abilities at the TEST Football Academy's Pro Day, an NFL Combine-like event. Scouts and various NFL teams were present. He ran the 40-yard dash in 4.47 seconds, performed a three-cone drill in 6.80 seconds, had a 44.5-inch vertical jump, and bench-pressed 225 pounds for 36 repetitions. The New York Jets were impressed and offered him a chance to try out for the team.

After the tryout, the New York Jets decided not to sign Beckham.

== Online career ==
Beckham's YouTube and Instagram accounts have amassed a large following and have turned him into a public figure in the fitness industry.

=== YouTube ===
Beckham launched his self-titled YouTube channel on April 29, 2010. The channel's content focuses on fitness and nutrition. As of November 2021, he has 359K subscribers.

=== Instagram ===
Beckham's Instagram account (@fbaftermath) features pictures and videos of his physique and an active lifestyle in the gym and outdoors. As of November 2021, he has 511K followers and is a verified account.

== Sponsorships ==
Beckham has sponsorship deals with Myprotein and Alpha Clothing.

== Other sports ==
Beckham had a stint with the Colorado XO, which is a rugby team in Colorado, and also trained with the Rugbytown Crossover Academy.

== Professional wrestling career ==
In 2017, Beckham was invited to participate in a tryout for the WWE. He was offered a deal with WWE but decided not to sign due to financial issues regarding his contract and stipulations within the contract.

In 2024, Beckham joined Reality of Wrestling and began his career as a Professional wrestler. In March, Beckham defeated Hans Steel in 19 Seconds, earning him the record for the fastest victory in a beat the Clock match in ROW history. Beckham also won the ROW Last Stand Rumble of 2024 by last eliminating Dexx Dixon.

== Content creation ==
On Instagram and YouTube Beckham documents his fitness journey which includes workouts and training videos. Beckham also streams on the livestreaming service Twitch. He streams a variety of content which consists of fighting games like Mortal Kombat 11, first person shooter games like Apex Legends and talks about fitness and his workouts.

Beckham also appeared in Olympic Outposts in 2018 on the episode Weightlifting in Samoa and also appeared in the documentary Strength Wars: The Movie.

== Personal life ==
Terry Beckham, his father, was a prominent track and field athlete at Morehead State University. His mother, Jerri Fondren, played basketball. Terron Beckham gained an interest in sports, playing organized American football at an early age.

Beckham is a passionate video gamer and often live streams himself playing games on Twitch. Beckham is also an anime fan; he has posted and discussed anime characters, such as Satoru Gojo from Jujutsu Kaisen and Meruem from Hunter × Hunter, on his Instagram.

Although Terron Beckham and Odell Beckham Jr. are cousins, they aren't close. However, Terron Beckham has a close relationship with Odell Beckham Jr.'s father, Odell Beckham Sr., who mentored Terron throughout high school and college.

In 2016, Beckham gained media attention when news outlets, such as The Washington Post, USA Today, and Bleacher Report, reported his goal of aiming for the NFL but over the years disappeared from the football aspect of things.

== Championships and accomplishments ==
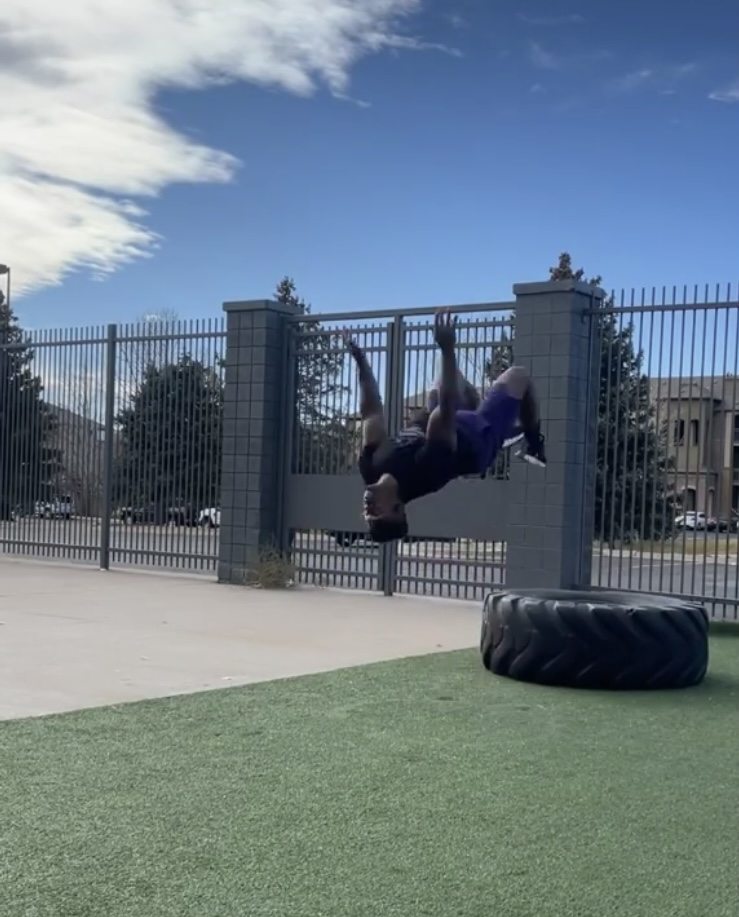
Terron Beckham doing a backflip.

=== Professional wrestling ===
- Reality of Wrestling
  - ROW Games: Ultimate Athlete (2024, inaugural)

=== Digital media ===
- YouTube
  - YouTube Creator Awards (100,000 subscribers) (1-time)
