= H. S. Broiles =

American politician (1845–1913)

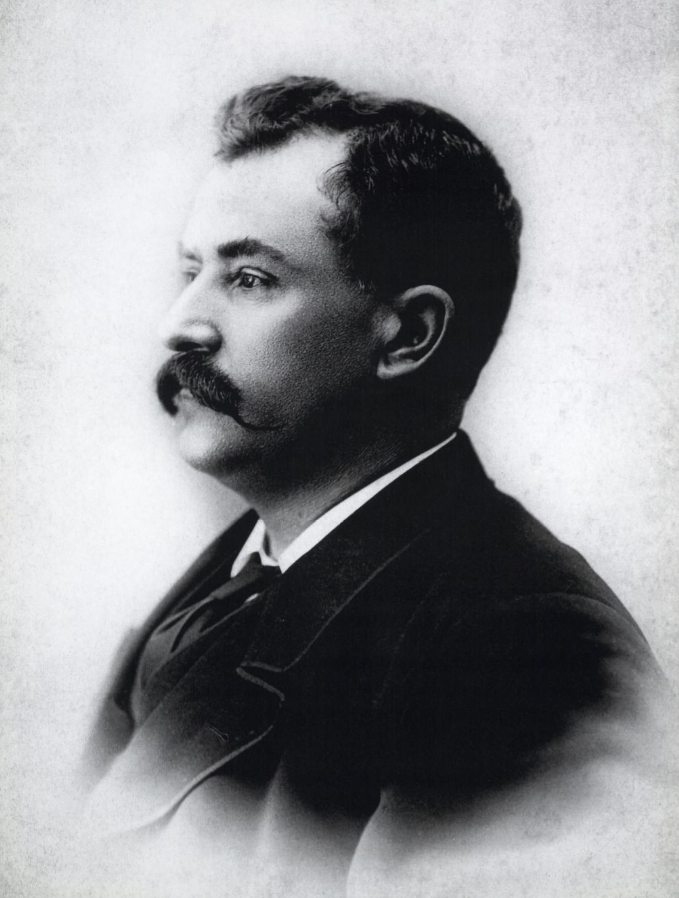

6th Mayor of Fort Worth, Texas
- In office April 20, 1886 – April 8, 1890
- Preceded by: John Peter Smith
- Succeeded by: William Smartt Pendleton

Personal details
- Born: Hiram Stokley Broiles; December 2, 1845 Millersburgh, Tennessee, U.S.
- Died: July 27, 1913 (aged 67) Leavenworth, Kansas, U.S.
- Party: Farmers' Alliance; People's; Republican; Socialist; Union Labor
- Spouse(s): Charlotte Wilmouth Grant; Amma Yarbrough
- Children: 10
- Education: University of Nashville

Military service
- Allegiance: United States; Confederate States
- Branch/service: United States Army; Confederate States Army
- Years of service: 1860–1863 (C.S.); 1864–1865 (U.S.)
- Unit: 45th Tennessee Infantry Regiment (C.S.); Second U.S. Volunteer Infantry (U.S.)

Hiram Stokley Broiles (December 2, 1845 – July 27, 1913) was an American politician who served as the 6th Mayor of Fort Worth, Texas from 1886 to 1890. He was involved with the Farmers' Alliance, People's, Republican, and Socialist, and Union Labor parties.

Broiles was born to a slave-owning family in Tennessee, and ran away to join the Confederate States Army at age 15. He served until his capture at the Battle of Missionary Ridge. He became a galvanized Yankee in order to leave prison, but deserted and stole equipment.

Broiles received a medical degree from the University of Nashville in 1873, and moved to Texas. He was elected to the Fort Worth Board of Aldermen in 1882, and mayor in 1886. He was reelected in 1888, but lost to William Smartt Pendleton in 1890.

== Early life and military career ==
Hiram Stokley Broiles was born in Millersburgh, Tennessee, on December 2, 1845, to Wilson Broiles and Fanny Hoover. He was one of ten children and his father owned six slaves in 1860.

Broiles ran away from home at age 15 and joined the Confederate States Army, enlisting into the 45th Tennessee Infantry Regiment. He was captured at the Battle of Missionary Ridge. He was imprisoned in Louisville, Kentucky, before being transferred to Rock Island Prison in December 1863.

On October 6, 1864, Broiles enlisted for a one-year term in the Union Army in order to leave prison. He was a private in Company F of the Second U.S. Volunteer Infantry. He deserted and stole equipment on October 10, 1865, while at Fort Zarah. His desertion charges would not be lifted until 1910.

== Career ==
In 1873, Broiles served as the secretary for Precinct 5 political meetings in Tarrant County. He was elected to the Fort Worth Board of Aldermen in 1882, but later resigned and was succeeded by W.R. Haymaker on August 30, 1882.

Broiles was elected mayor of Fort Worth in the 1886 election with the support of the Knights of Labor and Farmers' Alliance. He was reelected in 1888. Democratic nominee William Smartt Pendleton defeated him in the 1890 election.

During Broiles' time as mayor he attempted to suppress illegal activity in Hell's Half Acre. He filed a $35,000 libel lawsuit against the publishers of the Daily Gazette in 1887, after an editorial claimed he was giving out appointments and contracts for his own financial benefit. He got into multiple fights with journalist Sam Stone in 1889. He reestablished the police department fourteen years after it was dissolved.

Members of the Knights of Labor and former members of the Greenback Party attended a convention in Waco on July 5, 1887, and formed an affiliate of the Union Labor Party. Around 300 delegates, mostly members of the Farmers' Alliance, from seventy counties attended a convention on May 15, 1888, to consider possible electoral campaigns. The delegates appointed Broiles as a one-man executive committee and he called for a Nonpartisan Convention to be held on July 2–3. The Nonpartisan Convention created a platform and slate of candidates. In 1888, the Union Labor Party nominated Broiles for lieutenant governor. However, Broiles was replaced by W.A. Moers as the party did not want to be viewed as prohibitionist, which Broiles supported.

Broiles attended the organization meeting of the People's Party's Texas affiliate on August 17, 1891. He was a leader of the party in Fort Worth. He spoke at a meeting of the Socialist Party of America in 1906, and stated that "socialism was his religion".

In 1904, Broiles ran for a seat on Fort Worth's board of alderman from the seventh ward as a Republican, but he did not meet the residency requirements. He ran for mayor as a Republican instead, but lost to Democratic nominee T.J. Powell.

== Personal life and death ==
Broiles graduated from the University of Nashville with a medical degree in 1873. He moved to Texas in August 1873, and became a member of the medical association in Tarrant County. He moved to San Antonio in 1895, and continued his medical practice there. He became an insurance agent in 1898. He returned to Fort Worth, but moved to Nacogdoches, Texas, in 1910.

Broiles married Charlotte Wilmouth Grant, with whom he had six children before her death in 1891. On October 31, 1894, he married Amma Yarbrough, with whom he had four children. His son Barnes Hoover Broiles was the publisher of the Jacksonville Progress. Yarbrough died on March 22, 1959.

Broiles suffered a stroke in May 1912, and was partially paralyzed. He was admitted to the National Home for Disabled Volunteer Soldiers in Leavenworth, Kansas, in June. He died of a cerebral hemorrhage on July 27, 1913, and was buried in Leavenworth National Cemetery.

== Electoral history ==
1888 Fort Worth, Texas mayoral election
| Party | Candidate | Votes | % |
|---|---|---|---|
| | H.S. Broiles (incumbent) | 1,314 | 50.15% |
| | Jackson | 983 | 37.52% |
| | Darter | 323 | 12.33% |
| Total votes | | 2,620 | 100.00% |

1904 Fort Worth, Texas mayoral election
| Party | Candidate | Votes | % |
|---|---|---|---|
| Democratic | T.J. Powell (incumbent) | 1,616 | 83.73% |
| Republican | H.S. Broiles | 268 | 13.89% |
| Socialist | I.D. Schurman | 46 | 2.38% |
| Total votes | | 1,930 | 100.00% |

== Works cited ==
- Barr, Alwyn (1971). Reconstruction to Reform: Texas Politics, 1876-1906. University of Texas Press. ISBN 0292701357.
- Hild, Matthew (2015). "The Knights of Labor and the Third-Party Movement in Texas, 1886–1896". The Southwestern Historical Quarterly. 119 (1). Texas State Historical Association: 24–43. doi:10.2307/447112. JSTOR 24388910.
