= Stephen Dow Beckham =

American historian (1941–2026)

Stephen Dow Beckham (August 31, 1941 – October 10, 2026) was an American historian known for his work with Native Americans and the American West, especially the Pacific Northwest and the Lewis and Clark Expedition. He authored many works, and was a Professor Emeritus of History at Lewis & Clark College in Portland, Oregon.

== Life and career ==
Beckham was born in Marshfield (Coos Bay), Oregon, on August 31, 1941, the son of Ernest Dow Beckham and Anna Marie (Adamson) Beckham. Like his son, Ernest had a lifelong interest in history and wrote several books in his retirement, including Stars in the Dark: Coal Mines of Southwest Oregon. He had two younger brothers, Mark Ernest Beckham (1954–2000) and David Blake Beckham. Anna Marie died in 2001, and Ernest Dow Beckham died in 2005.

He earned his bachelor's degree in history and biology at the University of Oregon in 1964. He earned a master's degree and PhD in history/anthropology at University of California, Los Angeles in 1966 and 1969, respectively. His M.A. thesis was published in 1971 as Requiem for a People: The Rogue Indians and the Frontiersmen. From 1969 until 1977, he taught at Linfield University in McMinville, Oregon. From 1977 to 2012, he taught at Lewis & Clark College.

Beckham was also a leading authority on Indian law. He has been called as an expert witness in many land-use issues, including reservations, casinos, and fishing rights. His research has been used to determine tribal status, riparian rights, and boundary lines. By the time that he retired from full-time teaching, he had testified in more than 30 cases and continued to do so after that. He was also the lead instructor for the Indian Law Summer Program at Lewis & Clark Law School.

Additionally, Beckham helped to develop many museums and exhibits both in the Pacific Northwest and around the world. Some of his projects include The Literature of the Lewis and Clark Expedition touring exhibit, the Columbia Gorge Discovery Center in The Dalles, the National Historic Oregon Trail Interpretive Center in Baker City, The High Desert Museum in Bend, and Oregon, My Oregon at the Oregon Historical Society. Towards the end of his life, he served as one of the trustees of the Theodore Roosevelt Presidential Library.

Beckham died on October 10, 2026, at the age of 85.

== Selected bibliography ==
- George Gibbs, 1815-1873 : historian and ethnologist (1969)
- Coos Bay: The Pioneer Period, 1851-1890 (1973)
- Indians of Western Oregon: This Land Was Theirs (1977)
- Land of the Umpqua: A History of Douglas County, Oregon (1986)
- Tall Tales from Rogue River: The Yarns of Hathaway Jones (1990)
- Lewis & Clark College (1991)
- Many Faces: An Anthology of Oregon Autobiography (1993)
- Hoffman Construction Company: 75 Years of Building (1995)
- Requiem for a People: The Rogue Indians and the Frontiersmen (1996)
- Lewis and Clark in Oregon Country: From the Rockies to the Pacific (2002)
- Literature of the Lewis and Clark Expedition (2003)
- Oregon Indians: Voices from Two Centuries (2006)
- Stimson Lumber (2009)
- Fortune and Friendship: Lewis & Clark’s Heritage Properties (2009)
- Windows on America: The Challenges of Leadership (2013)
- Rise of the Collectors (2018)
- The Willamette Falls Fishery: Tribal Use and Occupancy (2018)
- Nestucca, Nechesne, and Siletz: Indians of Oregon’s North-Central Coast (2026)
- Astoria Column: Landmark at the Pacific Crossroads (2026)

== Sources ==
- Lewis and Clark College's Pamplin Society
- Lewis and Clark Law School
