= Hell's Half Acre (Fort Worth) =

Former red-light district in Fort Worth

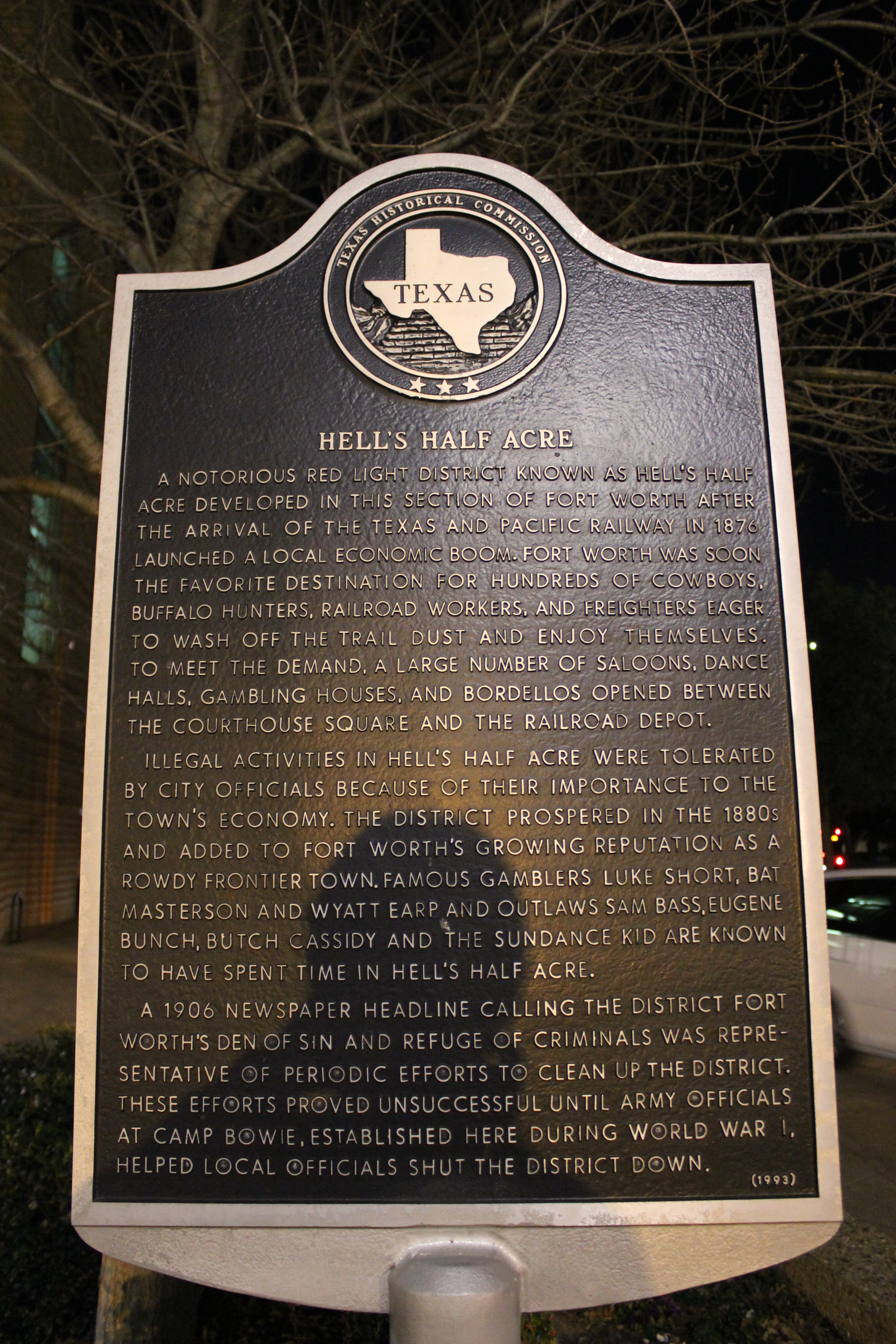
- Texas historical marker located at 12th and Houston street

- Location within Texas
- 32°45′01″N 97°19′42″W
- Location: Tarrant County, Texas
- Nearest city: Fort Worth, Texas

History
- Formed: 1870s

Site notes
- Elevation: 610 feet (190 m)
- Area: .5 acres (0.20 ha)
- Governing body: State of Texas

Hell's Half Acre was a precinct of Fort Worth, Texas designated as a red-light district beginning in the early to mid 1870s in the Old Wild West. It came to be called the town's "Bloody Third ward" because of the violence and lawlessness in the area.

== History ==
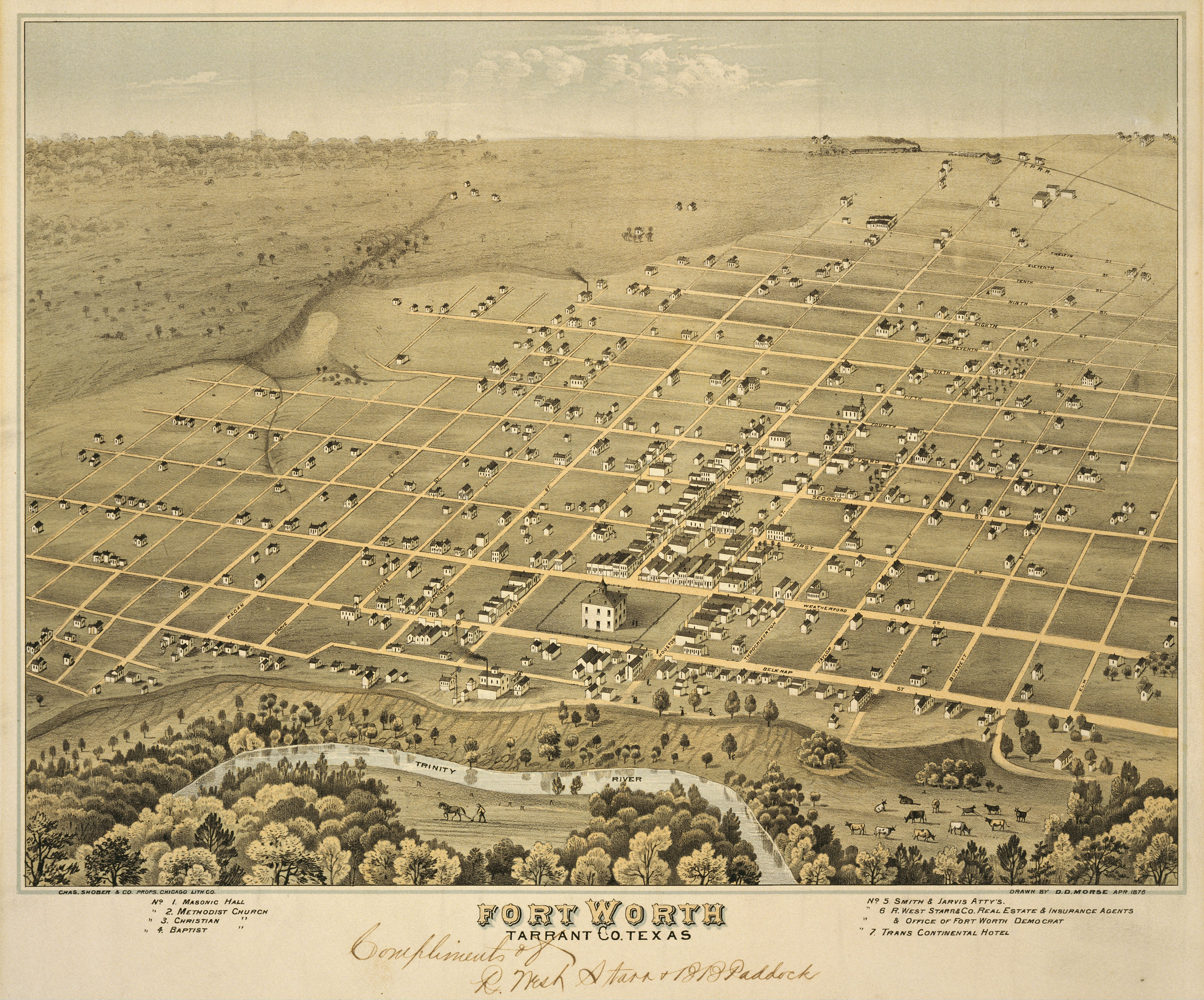
Fort Worth, Texas in 1876

The area developed in the 1870s as a rest stop on the cattle trails from Texas through Kansas. It quickly became populated with saloons, brothels, and other vice dens offering gambling, liquor, and prostitutes. The half-acre block was originally designated from Tenth Street to Fifteenth Street while intersecting with Houston Street, Main Street, and Rusk Street with Throckmorton and Calhoun streets established as boundaries. The Chisholm Trail and Texas and Pacific Railway were branded as the economic driving force leading to the progressive development of the rambunctious red-light district.

At its peak, Hell's Half Acre consisted of boarding houses, bordellos, gambling parlours, hotels, saloons, and a sparse assortment of mercantile businesses. It became a hide-out for thieves and violent criminals. The twenty-two thousand square foot ward caught the glimpse of such Old West personalities as Bat Masterson, Butch Cassidy, Doc Holliday, Etta Place, Luke Short, Sam Bass, Sundance Kid, and Wyatt Earp. This led to crackdowns by law enforcement though they rarely interfered with the gambling and other vice operations in the area. The Acre was an important source of income for the town, and despite outside pressures against the illegal activities, Fort Worth officials were reluctant to take action.

The city's most famous saloon was the White Elephant, technically located just outside of the Acre. The venue was known as much for its elegance and live entertainment as for its gun fights and often illegal dealings.

The major complaints against the area within the community were primarily against the dance halls and brothels, which reformers saw as the most immoral, as well as the general violence. The saloons and gambling halls were generally less of a concern. In 1889, following serious bouts of violence in the city, officials shut down many of the activities that were deemed as most directly contributing to the violence. By the start of the 20th century, the Acre's popularity as a destination for out-of-town visitors had diminished dramatically. The Progressive movement of the early 20th century put increasing pressure on the area. By 1919, Fort Worth's "Third Ward" was mostly spread throughout other parts of the city as a result of the U.S. Army's investment in Camp Bowie and the 1918 Spanish Flu.

== See also ==
- Cattle drives in the United States
- Fort Worth Stockyards
- Gilded Age
- History of vice in Texas
