= John Peter Smith (Texas politician) =

American politician and pioneer (1831–1901)

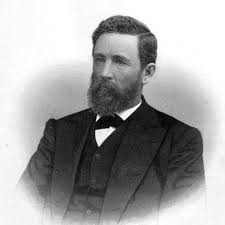
- The "Father of Fort Worth"

5th and 8th Mayor of Fort Worth, TX
- In office 11 April 1882 - 20 April 1886
- Preceded by: John T. Brown
- Succeeded by: H.S. Broiles
- In office 5 August 1890 - 12 April 1892
- Preceded by: William Smartt Pendleton
- Succeeded by: B. B. Paddock

Personal details
- Born: September 16, 1831 Owen County, Kentucky, U.S.
- Died: April 11, 1901 (aged 69) St. Louis, Missouri, U.S.
- Spouse: Mary E. Fox
- Education: Franklin College, Indiana; Bethany College, West Virginia
- Profession: Mayor, philanthropist, teacher, lawyer, land surveyor

Military service
- Allegiance: Confederate States
- Branch/service: Confederate States Army
- Years of service: 1861 - 1865
- Rank: Colonel
- Unit: 7th Texas Cavalry

John Peter Smith (September 16, 1831 – April 11, 1901), known as the 'Father of Fort Worth', was born in Owen County, Kentucky, to Samuel and Polly (Bond) Smith. Smith was instrumental in the early prosperity of the city of Fort Worth, its establishment as the Tarrant County seat, and the creation of the county's only public hospital which still bears his name.

== Early life ==
Smith and his five brothers were orphaned in 1844 after the death of their parents.

== Career ==
As an adult, he moved in 1853 to the Texas Territory, making Fort Worth his home. He opened the city's first school in 1854 followed by forming a bank, gas light company, and street railway.

A competition for the site of the Tarrant County seat arose in 1853 between the burgeoning cities of Fort Worth and Birdville, lasting for seven years and causing several fights and fatal duels. Smith successfully lobbied to move the county seat to his city.

In 1860, Smith voted against Texas Secession however, when Texas joined the fight, he promptly began to show his support for the Confederacy. After mustering up 120 Tarrant County men, Smith helped form Company K under the command of Col. William Steele. Joining the Seventh Texas Cavalry in Sibley's brigade, Smith fought with the Army of Western Louisiana in campaigns throughout New Mexico, Arizona, and Western Louisiana. He was severely wounded at Donaldsonville, Louisiana, in 1863 and slightly wounded at the battle of Mansfield, Louisiana, in 1864. In that same year Smith was promoted to Colonel of his regiment, and he commanded 600 soldiers until the Regiment disbanded in Navarro County on May 18, 1865.

In 1877, he donated five acres of land at the future 1500 South Main Street for the creation of a medical care facility. This later became John Peter Smith Hospital, Tarrant County's only public hospital.

Smith became mayor of Fort Worth in 1882, helping to found the city's first water department, independent school system, and school board.

== Personal life ==
On October 16, 1867, he married Mary E. Fox, the widow of a Fort Worth physician. They had five children together.

== Death ==
Smith died in 1901 while traveling to St. Louis, Missouri to promote Fort Worth. An attacker mugged him, and he later succumbed to his injuries. He is buried at the historical Oakwood Cemetery, a site he had donated to the city during his lifetime.

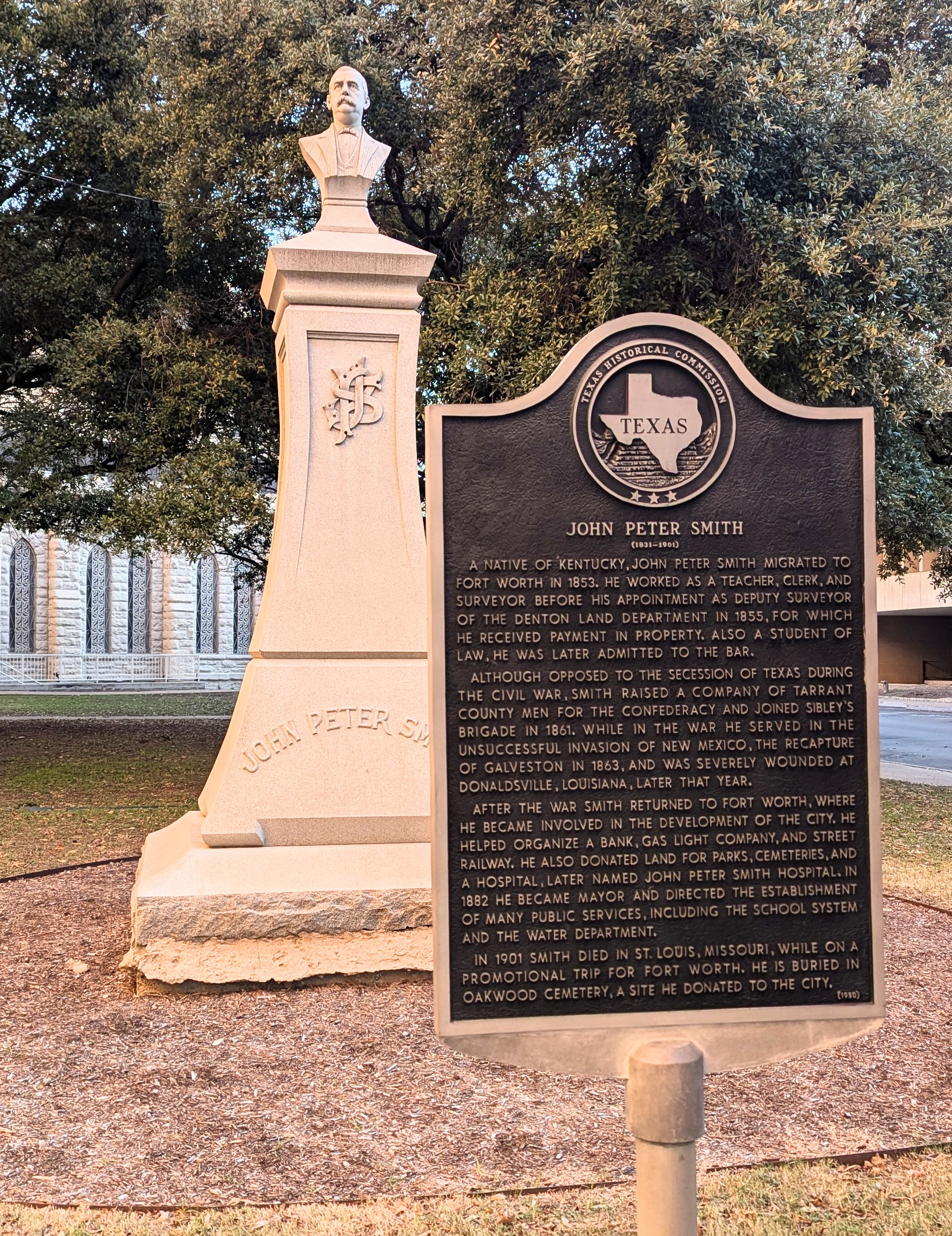
John Peter Smith Monument, Fort Worth TX

Citizens erected a marble bust, the John Peter Smith Monument, near St. Patrick's Cathedral in his honor.

== See also ==
- Timeline of Fort Worth, Texas
- History of Fort Worth, Texas
- John Peter Smith Hospital
