= John Peter Smith Hospital =

Geography
- Location: Fort Worth, TX, United States
- Coordinates: 32.7274°N 97.3272°W

Organization
- Type: Teaching
- Network: JPS Health Network

Services
- Emergency department: Level I trauma center
- Beds: 573

History
- Opened: 1906

Links
- Lists: Hospitals in the United States

John Peter Smith Hospital (also known as JPS Hospital) is a Level 1 Trauma Center, 573-bed public hospital located in Fort Worth, Texas that provides inpatient, outpatient, and behavioral healthcare.

== About ==
John Peter Smith Hospital is part of the tax-supported JPS Health Network of the Tarrant County Hospital District.

The hospital has an Emergency Department, Trauma Services Department, Urgent Care Center and is home to Tarrant County's only Psychiatric Emergency Center.

Established in 1906, the hospital is named for John Peter Smith, a former mayor of Fort Worth. Smith is considered by many to be "the Father of Fort Worth." He was instrumental in changing the Tarrant county seat to Fort Worth. Smith served six terms as mayor and donated many acres of land for public works projects such as cemeteries, parks, and the county hospital which bears his name.

The hospital is the first of two Level I Trauma Centers in Tarrant County.

The facilities at 1500 Main Street on Fort Worth's Near Southside, include a Patient Care Pavilion (a five-story acute care facility), an outpatient care center, and a dedicated facility for psychiatric services.

In August 1981 a flood caused power to go out in JPS hospital. A psychiatric patient at JPS helped direct emergency operations. "Michael," as he was called, put on scrubs and acted as a supervisor for hours before officials found out who he was and brought him back to his room. “He had everyone thinking he was in charge and he did a great job,” said a spokesman at JPS hospital relations. “He told a lot of people where supplies were throughout the hospital and arranged for a shipment of ice and performed in a superb fashion overall.”

== Academics ==
JPS is a teaching hospital and trains nurses, physicians, and other healthcare workers.

JPS is home to ACGME and AOA accredited residency programs including a Family Medicine, Emergency Medicine, Radiology, Psychiatry, Orthopedics, Obstetrics/Gynecology, Podiatry, and Transitional Year. It also is the main teaching hospital for the Texas College of Osteopathic Medicine at the University of North Texas Health Science Center and Texas Christian University Burnett School of Medicine. In addition, the hospital supports the University of Texas Southwestern Medical Center oral/maxillofacial residency and Baylor University Medical Center general surgery residency programs. In June 2011, the hospital welcomed its first batch of emergency medicine residents. The first class of emergency medicine residents graduated in June 2014.

JPS trains doctors through residency programs: Emergency Medicine, Family Medicine, Obstetrics and Gynecology, Oral and Maxillofacial Surgery, Orthopedic Surgery, Podiatry, Psychiatry, Sports Medicine and Transitional Internship.

JPS also has academic affiliations with Texas A&M Health Science Center.

=== Podiatry Residency ===
JPS’s Podiatry Residency program started in 1991 and is part of the Department of Orthopedic Surgery. The residency lasts for three years, with the first year split between Podiatry and rotations on other services, the second year spent in Podiatry except for a month rotating with Orthopedics, and the third year split between Podiatry and Orthopedics. There are two residents per year, for a total of six residents. This residency program is PMSR/RRA accredited.

JPS’s Podiatry Residency is widely considered one of the top podiatry residencies in the country. Residents gain exposure to a mix of surgery and clinical work through their time at JPS, including comanaging cases with other specialties. The rigorous curriculum of this program means residents are trained in a fast-paced, high volume environment, performing over 1,500 surgeries on average before graduating. Residents are expected to be on call for at least ten days per month in their first year, six days per month in their second year, and three days per month when Chief Resident in their third year. Residents have a high degree of autonomy and responsibility, running clinic by themselves and being involved in patient care from start to finish. The skills learned during JPS’s Podiatry Residency are equivalent to an orthopedic surgeon fellowship trained in foot and ankle surgery. As such, JPS’s podiatry residents are commonly recruited to join orthopedic groups as well as hospitals.

The Podiatry Residency at JPS has a faculty of five podiatrists, currently led by Dr. Travis A. Motley, a leading foot and ankle surgeon. Each faculty member is board certified in both foot and reconstructive ankle surgery. Dr. Motley also serves as the Presiding Officer of the Texas Podiatric Medical Examiners Advisory Board, which provides advice and recommendations to the Texas Department of Licensing and Regulation on technical matters relevant to the regulation of the practice of podiatry. Additionally, third year residents often work with Dr. Michael Downey, a top total ankle replacement (TAR) surgeon.

== Brain death controversy ==
Marlise Muñoz was 14 weeks pregnant when her husband found her unconscious in November 2013, possibly from a pulmonary embolism. She was subsequently declared brain dead after her arrival at JPS Hospital. Muñoz had previously indicated to her husband that she would not like to be kept artificially alive if brain dead. The fetus had suffered from oxygen deprivation and was suspected to be non-viable. Fetus' lower extremities were deformed to the extent that the gender couldn't be determined. Fetus also had fluid building up inside the skull (Hydrocephalus) and possibly had a heart problem. A 2002 study estimated the cost for an ICU bed in an average U.S. hospital is $2,000 to $3,000 per day.

When her husband asked that life support be removed JPS officials cited a state law requiring that a pregnant woman remain on life support - regardless of her end-of-life wishes - until the fetus is viable, usually at 24 to 26 weeks. Officials feared that if they turn off the machines, the Tarrant County District Attorney Joe Shannon Jr.'s office would charge them with murder of the fetus. The assistant district attorney insisted that the state had a compelling interest in protecting a fetus, pointing to a section of the Texas Penal Code that stated that a person may commit criminal homicide by causing the death of a fetus and a recently passed bill that banned abortions after 20 weeks of pregnancy on the theory that a fetus was capable of feeling pain at that stage. An attorney who had helped rewrite the Texas state law being used to keep her body on life support at John Peter Smith Hospital said that there was a problem with the application of the law to a patient that was no longer alive. The Texas law itself, passed in 1989 and amended in 1999, provides lawyers for each side with little guidance. The relevant section of the Texas Health and Safety Code is a single sentence, reading, “A person may not withdraw or withhold life-sustaining treatment under this subchapter from a pregnant patient.”

Her husband Eric, with the support of her family, successfully sued the hospital for continuing treatment. On January 24, 2014, a state judge issued an order giving JPS three days "to pronounce Mrs. Muñoz dead and remove the ventilator and all other 'life-sustaining' treatment from the body." On January 26 JPS issued the following statement: "The past eight weeks have been difficult for the Muñoz family, the caregivers and the entire Tarrant County community, which found itself involved in a sad situation. JPS Health Network has followed what we believed were the demands of a state statute. From the onset, JPS has said its role was not to make nor contest law but to follow it. On Friday, a state district judge ordered the removal of life-sustaining treatment from Marlise Muñoz. The hospital will follow the court order." At about the same time the statement was issued, Muñoz's body was removed from life support and released to her husband.

== Notable doctors ==
- Eddy Furniss, family physician
- John Haynes, Jr., family physician and surgeon
- Kent Brantly

== See also ==
- List of hospitals in Texas
- John Peter Smith (Texas politician)
- Parkland Memorial Hospital
