= Mike Moncrief =

American politician (born 1943)

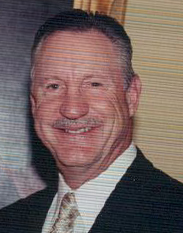

43rd Mayor of Fort Worth
- In office 20 May 2003 – 12 July 2011
- Preceded by: Kenneth Barr
- Succeeded by: Betsy Price

Member of the Texas Senate from the 12th district
- In office 1991–2003
- Preceded by: Hugh Q. Parmer
- Succeeded by: Jane Nelson

Personal details
- Born: September 5, 1943 (age 83) Houston, Texas, U.S.
- Party: Democratic
- Spouse: Rosie Moncrief
- Education: Tarleton State University
- Profession: Business owner

Michael J. Moncrief (born September 5, 1943) is an American retired judge and politician who served as the 43rd mayor of Fort Worth, Texas, from 2003 to 2011.

Moncrief started his political career when elected to the Texas Legislature on Nov.3,1970, serving for two years. From 1974 to 1986, he served as judge of the Tarrant County Commissioners Court. He was later elected as a State Senator from the 12th district as a Democrat. On May 3, 2003, Moncrief was elected mayor in a non-partisan race. He succeeded Kenneth Barr. He was re-elected in May 2009 with 70% of the vote.

Moncrief is an alumnus of Tarleton State University in Stephenville, Texas. He served as the first 'Texan Rider,' the mascot of Tarleton State.

== Election history ==
Senate election history of Moncrief from 1992.

=== Previous elections ===
==== 2000 ====
Texas general election, 2000: Senate District 12
Party	Candidate	Votes	%	±%
Republican	George Host	61,846	36.34	+36.34
Democratic	Mike Moncrief (Incumbent)	108,349	63.66	−36.34
Majority		46,503	27.32	−72.68
Turnout		170,195		+50.97
Democratic hold				

==== 1996 ====
Texas general election, 1996: Senate District 12
Party	Candidate	Votes	%	±%
Democratic	Mike Moncrief (Incumbent)	112,733	100.00	0.00
Majority		112,733	100.00	0.00
Turnout		112,733		+19.03
Democratic hold				

Democratic primary, 1996: Senate District 12
Candidate		Votes	%	±
✓	Mike Moncrief (Incumbent)	16,932	83.40	
	Nancy Ward	3,369	16.60	
Majority		13,563	66.81	
Turnout		20,301		

==== 1994 ====
Texas general election, 1994: Senate District 12
Party	Candidate	Votes	%	±%
Democratic	Mike Moncrief (Incumbent)	94,707	100.00	0.00
Majority		94,707	100.00	0.00
Turnout		94,707		−6.99
Democratic hold				

==== 1992 ====
Texas general election, 1992: Senate District 12
Party	Candidate	Votes	%	±%
Democratic	Mike Moncrief (Incumbent)	101,823	100.00	
Majority		101,823	100.00	
Democratic hold				

Texas Senate
Preceded by Hugh Q. Parmer	Texas State Senator from District 12 (Fort Worth); 1991–2003	Succeeded by Jane Nelson
