= Betsy Price =

Mayor of Fort Worth, Texas, United States

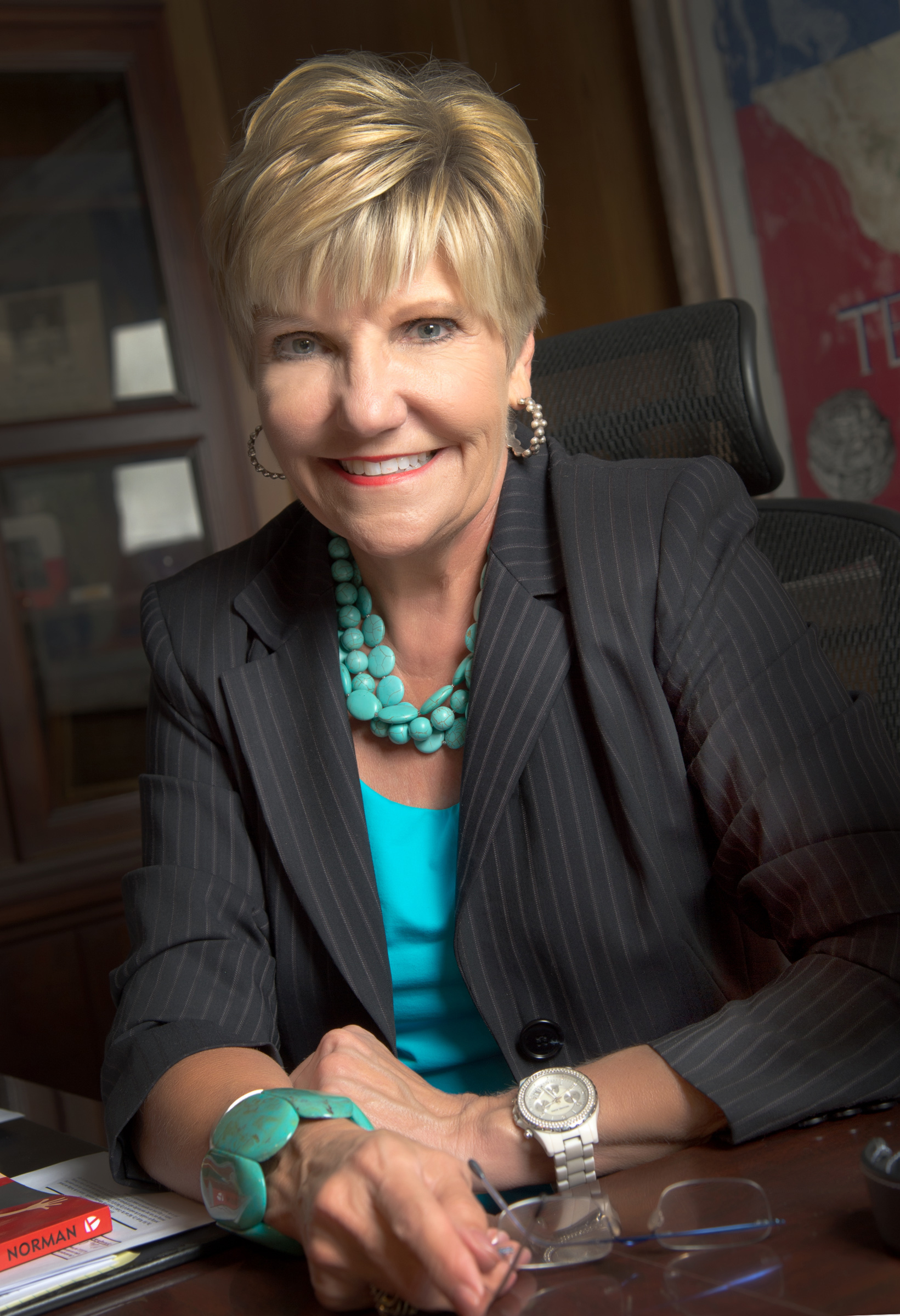
- Price in 2012

44th Mayor of Fort Worth
- In office July 12, 2011 – June 15, 2021
- Preceded by: Mike Moncrief
- Succeeded by: Mattie Parker

Personal details
- Born: Barbara Elizabeth Cornelius; October 21, 1949 (age 76) Tarrant County, Texas, U.S.
- Party: Republican
- Education: University of Texas, Arlington (BS)

Barbara Elizabeth Cornelius Price (born October 21, 1949) is an American businesswoman and politician who served as mayor of Fort Worth, Texas through 2021. She was first elected to the nonpartisan office on June 18, 2011. Price previously served 2½ terms as the elected Tarrant County tax assessor-collector, from 2001 to 2011. She is a Republican who describes herself as fiscally conservative, deplores polarization and extremist tendencies in both major parties, and professed a commitment to work for the entire community as an elected local official.

Having decided to not seek re-election as mayor after five terms and a tenure spanning ten years, Price announced in June 2021 that she would be a candidate for County Judge of Tarrant County.

In Texas, the county judge is the chief executive of the county and typically does not perform judicial duties. Unlike the mayor, the judge is elected in a partisan contest, which required Price to win nomination in the Republican primary. Although Price enjoyed personal popularity, she faced competition from hardline Republicans. She lost to Tim O'Hare, the former Tarrant County Republican chairman, who had the support of Allen West, the recently departed chair of the Texas GOP.

== Early life and education ==
Price was born Barbara Elizabeth Cornelius in Tarrant, Texas to parents Wayne Clarence Cornelius and Elizabeth Mary Dalton. Price is the youngest of four children. Residing on Tremont Avenue in the Arlington Heights neighborhood of Fort Worth, Price attended South Hi Mount Elementary School and Stripling Junior High School. She graduated from Arlington Heights High School in 1968, where she had been President of her homeroom, as well as President of the Future Homemakers of America. She was also a member of the Allied Youth and Young Citizen's Forum and spent time working as a nurse's assistant. As a high school senior, Price was selected as one of the elite Who's Who and was a finalist in a Daughters of the American Revolution contest. Her first jobs included babysitting and working at her family's used car business, Cornelius Motors, which is located on Fort Worth's northeast side. With aspirations after high school to become a veterinarian, Price earned a Bachelor of Science degree in biology from the University of Texas at Arlington in 1972.

== Career ==
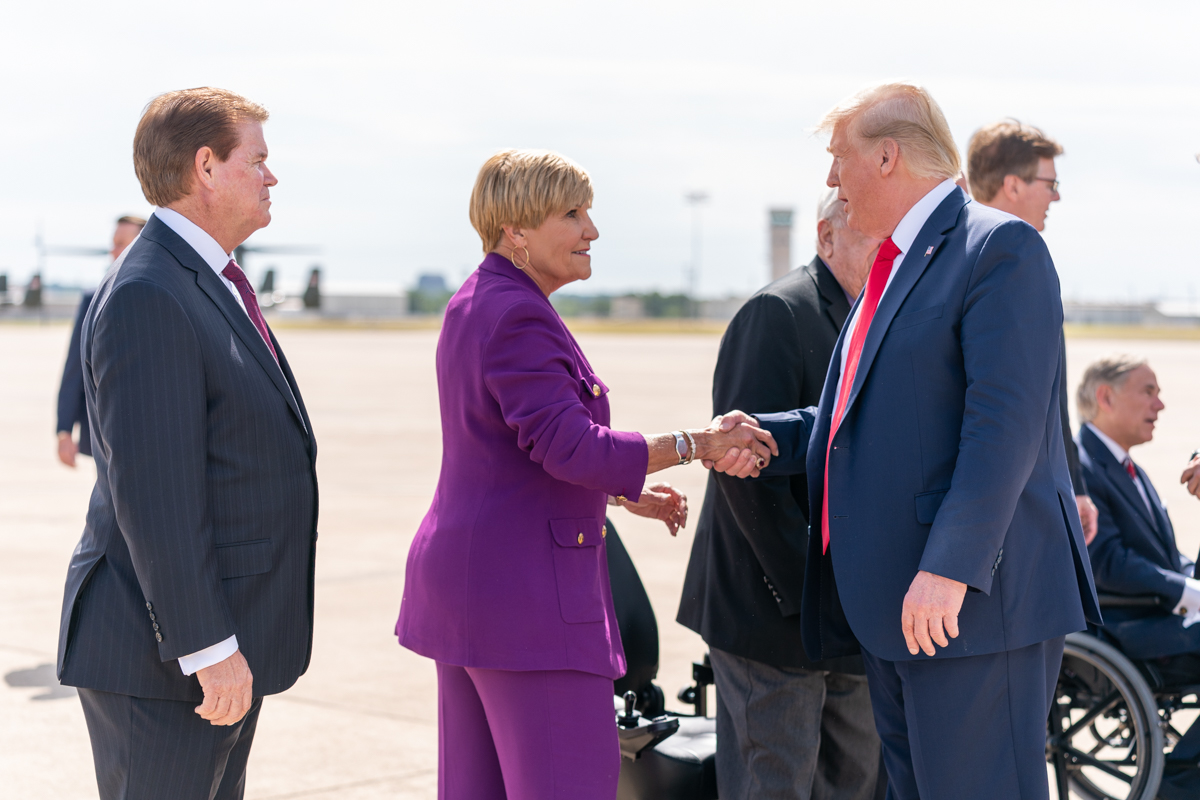
Price shakes hands with President Donald Trump in 2019

Beginning in the late 1980s, Price ran her own car title and licensing company from her father's car business for 17 years, during which she involved herself in title lending reform at the state level and became active in other community affairs such as the FWPD's Bike Officers Citizens Support Club. She had also been the Vice President of the Red Cross. Price served on numerous boards, commissions, and professional associations.

Active in the Republican Party, Price began her first bid for public office and ran for office in 2000 for the position of Tarrant County's Tax Assessor. She was elected. Price has stated she never thought about running for mayor, but began contemplating the position after being approached by several politicos, including Congresswoman Kay Granger, who was the first female mayor of Fort Worth in the early 1990s.

In 2011, Price decided to run for mayor of Fort Worth, Texas, winning a run-off election against Jim Lane in the non-partisan contest. She succeeded Mike Moncrief. She was elected to a third consecutive term in 2015, running unopposed.

In April 2016, Price announced her support for several measures to change the city charter: the most important included increasing the number of council seats from 8 to 10 (due to the city's northward expansion), increasing the term of office from 2 years to 3 years, raising the pay of the council, and determining how to fill a vacant council seat.

In May 2019, Price defeated Tarrant County Democratic Party Chair Deborah Peoples, who earned 42% of the vote, compared with Price's 56%.

In October 2019, Price denounced the Fort Worth Police Department's shooting of Atatiana Jefferson and announced that she wanted the police chief to conduct a "complete and thorough investigation."

In 2020, Price contracted Covid-19, but recovered, after several scares with the virus throughout the pandemic. On January 6, 2021, Price announced that she would not seek a sixth term.

During her time as mayor, she was known to have a close working relationship with Dallas Mayor Mike Rawlings.

== Personal life ==
She has been married to Tom Price, an insurance executive, for more than 40 years. They have three adult children and several grandchildren.

== Honors ==
- Jason Baldwin, Fort Worth Parks & Recreation Advisory Board Chairman proposed renaming the Northwest Community Center to Betsy Price Community Center. City Council approved the name change on December 10, 2024.

Political offices
Preceded by Mike Moncrief	Mayor of Fort Worth; 2011–2021	Succeeded by Mattie Parker
