= 2023 United States ballot measures =

- March 7 to November 18, 2023

Part of the 2023 United States elections

As 2023 coincides neither with the calendar for regular federal elections nor with most elections for state offices (save for Kentucky, Louisiana, Mississippi, New Jersey and Virginia), most 2023 ballot measures either coincided with municipal or judicial elections or were held on separate dates as the sole questions on the ballot. With 47 ballot measures sent to the statewide ballot in multiple states, 2023 had the highest number of statewide ballot measures approved for the ballot in an odd-year election since 2007, when 45 measures (four citizen initiatives, 41 legislative referrals) were certified for statewide ballots. Ballot measures were also held at the local and tribal level.

== List by state ==
=== Colorado ===
| Origin | Status | Measure | Description (Result of a "yes" vote) | Date | Yes | No |
|---|---|---|---|---|---|---|
| Legislature | Failed | Proposition HH | Reduce property tax rates; allow the state to retain and spend revenues that it would otherwise be required to refund to residents under the Colorado Taxpayer's Bill of Rights (TABOR); create a new, increased cap on state revenue, allowing the state to retain and spend additional revenue each year up to the Proposition HH Cap; allocate revenue to local governments to make up for decreased property tax revenues; and create a limit on local government property tax revenue. | Nov 7 | 682,667; 40.69% | 995,259; 59.31% |
| Legislature | Approved | Proposition II | Allow the state to keep revenue that exceeds official projections from increased taxes on cigarettes, tobacco, and nicotine products, which voters approved as Proposition EE; and require the state to spend this revenue on preschool programs. | Nov 7 | 1,130,047; 67.53% | 543,405; 32.47% |

=== Louisiana ===
| Origin | Status | Measure | Description (Result of a "yes" vote) | Date | Yes | No |
|---|---|---|---|---|---|---|
| Legislature | Approved | Louisiana Amendment 1, Ban on Private or Foreign Funding of Election Costs Amendment | Prohibit state and local governments from using funds, goods, and services donated by foreign governments or nongovernmental (private) sources for the purpose of conducting elections. | Oct 14 | 734,324; 72.57% | 277,564; 27.43% |
| Legislature | Approved | Louisiana Amendment 2, Constitutional Right to Worship in a Church or Place of Worship Amendment | Provide in the state constitution that "the freedom to worship in a church or other place of worship is a fundamental right that is worthy of the highest order of protection;" and provide that a legal challenge brought against a state or a local government action for conflicting with the right would be required to be examined by a court with strict scrutiny. | Oct 14 | 805,676; 79.20% | 211,621; 20.80% |
| Legislature | Approved | Louisiana Amendment 3, State Retirement System Funding Amendment | Require a minimum of 25% of state revenue that is designated as nonrecurring to be applied to the balance of the unfunded liability of the state retirement system. | Oct 14 | 559,540; 56.16% | 436,717; 43.84% |
| Legislature | Approved | Louisiana Amendment 4, Prohibit Property Tax Exemptions for Nonprofits Owning Damaged Residential Property Amendment | Prohibit a nonprofit organization from receiving a property tax exemption if they own residential property that is in such a state of disrepair that it is dangerous to the public's health or safety, as determined by the governing authority of the municipality or parish the property is located in. | Oct 14 | 661,332; 66.00% | 340,632; 34.00% |
| Legislature | Approved | Louisiana Amendment 1, Gubernatorial Deadlines on Bills and Legislative Veto Sessions Amendment | Providing that the governor's deadline to act on a bill is based on the legislative session in which the bill was passed rather than whether or not the legislature is in session and that the legislature may consider vetoed bills during a regular or extraordinary session rather than convening a separate veto session. | Nov 18 | 387,207; 61.03% | 247,266; 38.97% |
| Legislature | Approved | Louisiana Amendment 2, Remove Constitutional References to Inactive State Funds Amendment | Repeal constitutional provisions establishing various state funds that are now inactive and allows for remaining money in the funds to be transferred to the state general fund. | Nov 18 | 346,766; 54.70% | 287,211; 45.30% |
| Legislature | Approved | Louisiana Amendment 3, Property Tax Exemptions for First Responders Amendment | Authorize local governments to provide an additional property tax exemption of up to $2,500 for first responders including fire fighters, emergency medical service personnel, emergency response dispatchers, peace officers, police officers, and sheriffs. | Nov 18 | 338,823; 53.00% | 300,477; 47.00% |
| Legislature | Failed | Louisiana Amendment 4, Revenue Stabilization Trust Fund Amendment | Allow the state legislature, through a two-thirds supermajority vote, to use up to $250 million of funds in the Revenue Stabilization Trust Fund to alleviate a budget deficit. | Nov 18 | 278,009; 44.01% | 353,622; 55.99% |

=== Maine ===
| Origin | Status | Measure | Description (Result of a "yes" vote) | Date | Yes | No |
|---|---|---|---|---|---|---|
| Citizens | Approved | Maine Question 1 | Require voter approval for certain state entities, municipal electric districts, electrification cooperatives, or consumer-owned transmission utilities to incur a total outstanding debt that exceeds $1 billion. | Nov 7 | 260,670; 65.47% | 137,478; 34.53% |
| Citizens | Approved | Maine Question 2, Prohibit Foreign Spending in Elections Initiative | Prohibit foreign governments, or entities with at least 5% foreign government ownership or control, from spending money to influence ballot measures or candidate elections. | Nov 7 | 348,781; 86.33% | 55,226; 13.67% |
| Citizens | Failed | Maine Question 3, Pine Tree Power Company Initiative | Create the Pine Tree Power Company, an electric transmission and distribution utility governed by an elected board, and would allow the company to purchase and acquire all investor-owned transmission and distribution utilities in Maine. | Nov 7 | 122,961; 30.26% | 283,401; 69.74% |
| Citizens | Approved | Maine Question 4, "Right to Repair Law" Vehicle Data Access Requirement Initiative | Require motor vehicle manufacturers to standardize on-board vehicle diagnostics and make access to vehicle systems available to owners and third-party independent shops for repairs. | Nov 7 | 341,574; 84.38% | 63,208; 15.62% |
| Legislature | Approved | Maine Question 5, Change Time Period of Judicial Review of Initiative Petitions Amendment | Change the timeline for the judicial review of initiative petitions, including: changing the judicial review period from within 100 days of a petition being filed to within 100 business days of a petition being filed; and allowing for the judicial review period to begin 30 days after a general election when an initiative petition is filed within 30 days of a general election. | Nov 7 | 227,602; 57.70% | 166,876; 42.30% |
| Legislature | Approved | Maine Question 6, Require Indian Treaty Obligations and Other Constitutional Provisions Included in Official Printing Amendment | Require Maine Indian Treaty Obligations, codified as Section 5 of Article X of the Maine Constitution, and Sections 1 and 2 of Article X to be included in official printed copies of the constitution. | Nov 7 | 289,818; 72.95% | 107,466; 27.05% |
| Legislature | Failed | Maine Question 7, Remove Residency Requirement for Initiative Petition Circulators Amendment | Remove a constitutional provision, previously found unconstitutional by a federal appellate court, that says a circulator for a citizen initiative or referendum petition must be a citizen of Maine. | Nov 7 | 122,646; 31.26% | 269,699; 68.74% |
| Legislature | Failed | Maine Question 8, Repeal Constitutional Provision Prohibiting Voting for Individuals Under Guardianship Due to Mental Illness Amendment | Remove a constitutional provision, previously found unconstitutional by a federal district court in 2001, that says individuals under guardianship for reasons of mental illness cannot vote for governor, senators, and representatives. | Nov 7 | 184,063; 46.58% | 211,120; 53.42% |

=== New York ===
| Origin | Status | Measure | Description (Result of a "yes" vote) | Date | Yes | No |
|---|---|---|---|---|---|---|
| Legislature | Approved | New York Proposal 1, Remove Debt Limit on Small City School Districts Amendment | Eliminate the constitutional debt limit for small city school districts, which amounted to 5% of the average full value of the last five years' property tax rolls within the district. | Nov 7 | 1,504,083; 64.34% | 833,758; 35.66% |
| Legislature | Approved | New York Proposal 2, Exclude Indebtedness for Sewage Facilities Amendment | Allow municipalities to exclude from their constitutional debt limits indebtedness for the construction or reconstruction of sewage facilities for an additional ten years (2024-2034). | Nov 7 | 1,582,382; 68.00% | 744,696; 32.00% |

=== Ohio ===
| Origin | Status | Measure | Description (Result of a "yes" vote) | Date | Yes | No |
|---|---|---|---|---|---|---|
| Legislature | Failed | Ohio Issue 1 | Increase the voter approval threshold for new constitutional amendments to 60%; require citizen-initiated constitutional amendment campaigns to collect signatures from each of the state's 88 counties, an increase from half (44) of the counties; and eliminate the cure period of 10 days for campaigns to gather additional signatures for citizen-initiated constitutional amendments when the original submission did not have enough valid signatures. | Aug 8 | 1,329,052; 42.89% | 1,769,482; 57.11% |
| Citizens | Approved | Ohio Issue 1 | Provide a state constitutional right to "make and carry out one’s own reproductive decisions, including but not limited to" decisions about abortion, contraception, fertility treatment, miscarriage care, and continuing pregnancy, and allow the state to restrict abortion after fetal viability, except when “necessary to protect the pregnant patient’s life or health.” | Nov 7 | 2,227,384; 56.78% | 1,695,480; 43.22% |
| Citizens | Approved | Ohio Issue 2 | Legalize marijuana in Ohio, including: allowing the sale and purchase of marijuana, which a new Division of Cannabis Control would regulate; allowing adults who are at least 21 years old to use and possess marijuana, including up to 2.5 ounces of marijuana; and enacting a 10% tax on marijuana sales. | Nov 7 | 2,226,399; 57.19% | 1,666,3166; 42.81% |

=== Oklahoma ===
| Origin | Status | Measure | Description (Result of a "yes" vote) | Date | Yes | No |
|---|---|---|---|---|---|---|
| Citizens | Failed | Oklahoma State Question 820 | Legalize recreational marijuana for adults 21 years old and older, allowing adults to possess up to one ounce (28.35 grams) of marijuana and grow up to six mature marijuana plants and up to six seedlings, and enacting a tax on marijuana sales. | Mar 7 | 217,078; 38.33% | 349,284; 61.67% |

=== Texas ===
| Origin | Status | Measure | Description (Result of a "yes" vote) | Date | Yes | No |
|---|---|---|---|---|---|---|
| Legislature | Approved | Texas Proposition 1 | Establish a right to farming, ranching, timber production, horticulture, and wildlife management in the Texas Constitution. | Nov 7 | 2,025,803; 79.03% | 537,666; 20.97% |
| Legislature | Approved | Texas Proposition 2 | Amend the state constitution to allow counties or municipalities to authorize a property tax exemption on all or part of the appraised value of real property used to operate child-care facilities. | Nov 7 | 1,629,151; 64.78% | 885,704; 35.22% |
| Legislature | Approved | Texas Proposition 3 | Amend the state constitution to prohibit the Legislature from enacting a wealth or net worth tax in the future. | Nov 7 | 1,712,458; 67.89% | 809,815; 32.11% |
| Legislature | Approved | Texas Proposition 4 | Amend the state constitution to increase the homestead tax exemption from $40,000 to $100,000; authorize the state legislature to limit the annual appraisal increase on non-homestead real property; exclude appropriations made to increase state education funding from the state appropriations limit; and authorize the state legislature to provide for four-year terms for members of the governing body of an appraisal entity in counties with a population of 75,000 or more. | Nov 7 | 2,121,784; 83.44% | 421,177; 16.56% |
| Legislature | Approved | Texas Proposition 5 | Rename the National Research University Fund to the Texas University Fund and allocating annually the interest income, dividends, and investment earnings from the state's rainy day fund to the university fund to support research activities at state universities. | Nov 7 | 1,622,620; 64.35% | 898,790; 35.65% |
| Legislature | Approved | Texas Proposition 6 | Amend the state constitution to create the Texas Water Fund administered by the Texas Water Development Board to finance water projects in the state. | Nov 7 | 1,969,996; 77.66% | 566,712; 22.34% |
| Legislature | Approved | Texas Proposition 7 | Create the Texas Energy Fund to be administered by the Public Utilities Commission and authorizing the state legislature to allocate funds for the modernization of electric generating facilities. | Nov 7 | 1,644,279; 64.92% | 888,410; 35.08% |
| Legislature | Approved | Texas Proposition 8 | Amend the state constitution to create the broadband infrastructure fund to finance broadband and telecommunications projects. | Nov 7 | 1,750,736; 69.45% | 770,112; 30.55% |
| Legislature | Approved | Texas Proposition 9 | Amend the state constitution to authorize the state legislature to make cost-of-living adjustments to certain annuitants, as defined by law, of the Teacher Retirement System of Texas. | Nov 7 | 2,145,585; 83.73% | 416,824; 16.27% |
| Legislature | Approved | Texas Proposition 10 | Amend the state constitution to authorize the state legislature to provide for an ad valorem tax exemption on equipment and inventory manufactured by medical or biomedical companies. | Nov 7 | 1,370,569; 55.00% | 1,121,576; 45.00% |
| Legislature | Approved | Texas Proposition 11 | Amend the state constitution to authorize the state legislature to permit conservation and reclamation districts in El Paso County to issue bonds to fund parks and recreational facilities. | Nov 7 | 1,526,830; 63.35% | 883,339; 36.65% |
| Legislature | Approved | Texas Proposition 12 | Amend the state constitution to provide for the abolishment of the Galveston County treasurer and authorizing the county to employ or contract a qualified person or designate another county officer to fulfill the function previously performed by the treasurer. | Nov 7 | 1,212,667; 52.94% | 1,078,056; 47.06% |
| Legislature | Failed | Texas Proposition 13 | Amend the state constitution to increase the mandatory retirement age for state judges and justices from 75 to 79. | Nov 7 | 932,834; 37.31% | 1,567,129; 62.69% |
| Legislature | Approved | Texas Proposition 14 | Amend the state constitution to create the Centennial Parks Conservation Fund—a trust fund for the creation and improvement of state parks. | Nov 7 | 1,928,021; 76.52% | 591,658; 23.48% |

=== Wisconsin ===
| Origin | Status | Measure | Description (Result of a "yes" vote) | Date | Yes | No |
|---|---|---|---|---|---|---|
| Legislature | Approved | Wisconsin Question 1 | Amend the state constitution to allow the state legislature to define what serious harm means in relation to the bail conditions that judges impose on accused persons released before their criminal trial, for the purpose of “[protecting] members of the community from serious harm." | Apr 4 | 1,163,303; 66.55% | 584,624; 33.45% |
| Legislature | Approved | Wisconsin Question 2 | Amend the state constitution to consider the totality of the circumstances when imposing and setting cash bail for persons accused of violent crimes, including circumstances related to a previous conviction of a violent crime, the probability the accused will not appear in court, the need to protect the community from serious harm as defined by the state legislature, the need to prevent witness intimidation, and the potential affirmative defenses of the accused. | Apr 4 | 1,186,025; 67.57% | 569,286; 32.43% |
| Legislature | Approved | Wisconsin Question 3 | Advise the state legislature to require "able-bodied, childless adults... to look for work in order to receive taxpayer-funded welfare benefits." | Apr 4 | 1,417,035; 79.57% | 363,941; 20.43% |

== Local ballot measures ==
The following is a list of notable ballot measures held at the local level.

=== California ===
==== March ====
- Redondo Beach Measure CA5, would amend the city charter to allow for ranked-choice voting in city elections

=== Michigan ===
==== November ====
- East Lansing, Michigan Ranked-Choice Voting Amendment, which would legalize ranked-choice voting in city elections
- Kalamazoo, Michigan Ranked-Choice Voting Amendment, which would legalize ranked-choice voting in city elections
- Royal Oak, Michigan Ranked-Choice Voting Amendment, which would legalize ranked-choice voting in city elections

=== Minnesota ===
==== November ====
- Minnetonka, Minnesota Repeal of Ranked-Choice Voting Amendment, which would repeal the use of ranked-choice voting for city elections

=== Vermont ===
==== March ====
- Burlington Vermont Question 6, would legalize ranked-choice voting for mayor, school commissioner and ward election officer

== Tribal ballot measures ==
=== Eastern Band of Cherokee Indians ===
==== September ====
- ECBI Question 1, which would allow the issuing of mixed drink permits for sale of mixed beverages on tribal land. The measure was approved.
- ECBI Question 2, which would legalize the possession, use and regulation of cannabis on tribal land. The measure was approved.
