= Texas Proposition 8 =

Texas Proposition 8 may refer to various ballot measures in Texas, including:

- 1972 Texas Proposition 8, about changing the length of the terms of statewide elected offices in Texas
- 2007 Texas Proposition 8, about home equity loans
- 2021 Texas Proposition 8, about a homestead property tax exemption for the surviving spouse of a military member "killed or fatally injured in the line of duty"
- 2023 Texas Proposition 8
