= Proposition 5 =

Proposition 5 may refer to:

- 2008 California Proposition 5
- 2018 California Proposition 5
- 2024 California Proposition 5
- Various ballot measures in Texas, including:
  - 2007 Texas Proposition 5
  - 2021 Texas Proposition 5
  - 2023 Texas Proposition 5
- 2022 Vermont Proposition 5
