= Texas Proposition 7 =

Texas Proposition 7 may refer to various ballot measures in Texas, including:

- 2007 Texas Proposition 7
- 2021 Texas Proposition 7
- 2023 Texas Proposition 7
