= Texas Proposition 2 =

Texas Proposition 2 may refer to various ballot measures in Texas, including:

- 2005 Texas Proposition 2
- 2007 Texas Proposition 2
- 2021 Texas Proposition 2
- 2023 Texas Proposition 2
