= Texas Proposition 3 =

Texas Proposition 3 may refer to various ballot measures in Texas, including:

- 2007 Texas Proposition 3
- 2021 Texas Proposition 3
- 2023 Texas Proposition 3
