= 2023 Eastern Band of Cherokee Indians Marijuana Legalization Measure =

Referendum Question #2
- September 7, 2023
- Do you support legalizing the possession and use of cannabis for persons who are at least twenty-one (21) years old, and require the EBCI Tribal Council to develop legislation to regulate the market?

Results
Choice	Votes	%
Yes	2,464	69.98%
No	1,057	30.02%
Valid votes	3,521	100.00%
Invalid or blank votes	0	0.00%
Total votes	3,521	100.00%
Registered voters/turnout	6,716	52.43%
- Referendum results by tribal community (Pending release of certified results)

Referendum Question #2, the Eastern Band of Cherokee Indians Marijuana Legalization Measure, was a ballot measure in the US that was sent to voters on September 7, 2023, by the Eastern Band of Cherokee Indians Tribal Council. The proposal sought to legalize the recreational use of cannabis on tribal lands for those over the age of 21, and to require the EBCI Tribal Council to adopt legislation to regulate legal cannabis.

According to the EBCI's official results, the measure passed in a landslide, by 70% to 30%. 52.43% of registered voters turned out in the referendum.

== Background ==
As a federally recognized tribe, the Eastern Band of Cherokee Indians' authority to regulate cannabis supersedes North Carolina law, but only on the Qualla Boundary, the tribe's land trust, where it has authority. Off of tribal land, cannabis remains illegal for all purposes in North Carolina, and transporting cannabis off of tribal land constitutes a violation of state law. Historically, federal law concerning cannabis applied to recognized tribes, and it is de jure illegal nationwide, regardless of local jurisdiction. However, August 2013's Cole Memorandum established that the federal government would not enforce these laws in states and federally recognized tribes that legalized and regulated the drug.

Cannabis has been on the tribal government's agenda since 2015. An organization, Common Sense Cannabis, convinced the Tribal Council to approve a feasibility study for legalized cannabis that year, however, the study was vetoed by the Principal Chief at the time, Patrick Lambert. The following year, efforts on cannabis reform were more successful, with the Tribal Council passing a resolution instructing the tribal attorney general to draft legislation legalizing medical cannabis. A new feasibility study was approved in 2019, analyzing the pros and cons of medical cannabis legalization.

Finally, as part of the growing trend of cannabis reform in the United States, in May 2021, the EBCI's Tribal Council voted to decriminalize small amounts of cannabis on tribal land for individuals over 21 years of age. Later that year, in August, the council approved an ordinance establishing the EBCI Cannabis Control Board and legalizing the cultivation, sale, and usage of cannabis for medicinal purposes for individuals over 18 with select medical conditions. Applications for medical cannabis licenses opened up to tribal members in April 2023, and in June 2023, the EBCI permitted all North Carolina residents to apply for a license.

In July 2023, the council voted 56–38 to approve a ballot measure introduced by councilmember Teresa McCoy for the tribe's September 7 general election, intended to legalize recreational cannabis. While nonbinding, the Tribal Council has indicated that they will respect the vote and implement the changes approved by the voters. The referendum additionally does not legalize high-potency cannabis for recreational use, instead placing it under the sole authority of the tribe's medical cannabis program and the EBCI Cannabis Control Board. In the EBCI's elections, only members of the tribe over the age of 18 may vote.

== Opposition and support ==
While widely expected to pass and widely supported amongst the EBCI, the ballot measure encountered opposition from several notable figures. Opponents expressed concerns over violation of federal law and the mental health effects of marijuana, while supporters touted the economic benefits of legalizing the drug. Opposition and support additionally focused on not just whether marijuana should be legalized by the EBCI or not, but whether the tribe had the right to hold the referendum and legalize cannabis, and this section indicates those that took positions on one of or both of these issues.

=== Opposition ===
==== U.S. representatives ====
- Chuck Edwards, NC-11 (Republican)
  - Chuck Edwards, U.S. Representative for North Carolina's 11th congressional district, home to the Qualla Boundary, came out in opposition to the proposal, introducing the Stop Pot Act in the 118th Congress, stating:
    "The laws of any government should not infringe on the overall laws of our nation, and federal funds should not be awarded to jurisdictions that willfully ignore federal law. During a time when our communities are seeing unprecedented crime, drug addiction, and mental illness, the Stop Pot Act will help prevent even greater access to drugs and ease the strain placed on our local law enforcement and mental health professionals who are already stretched thin."
    The legislation is intended to withhold ten percent of federal highway funds for governments that violate federal law concerning marijuana. Edwards additionally wrote an opinion piece in The Carolina Journal opposing the referendum. Edwards' proposed legislation and statements concerning cannabis were met with backlash and criticism, with EBCI Principal Chief Richard Sneed criticizing the act as “a major political blunder" in a published statement in the official tribal newspaper. Sneed additionally criticized Edwards' disregard of tribal sovereignty.
- Greg Murphy, NC-03 (Republican)
  - Murphy co-sponsored the Stop Pot Act.

==== North Carolina state representatives ====
- Tim Moore, Speaker of the North Carolina House of Representatives and member of the North Carolina House of Representatives from the 111th district (Republican)
  - On the matter of the referendum, Moore expressed his belief that it was problematic, stating:
    “I think there’s some issues about how far they can go in terms of recreational. I’ve heard debates among different legal authorities about whether that’s permissible or not. Medical use, if it’s properly supervised with medical professionals involved, is OK. But, I think if you go down this road with recreational it’s really problematic.”

==== Tribal and local officials ====
- Michael Stamper, EBCI Tribal Council member (Nonpartisan)

==== Organizations ====
- Christian Action League of North Carolina
- Smart Approaches to Marijuana

=== Support ===
==== U.S. Armed Forces officials ====
- Moe Davis, retired U.S. Air Force colonel, former director of the Air Force Judiciary, former chief prosecutor of the Guantanamo military commission (2005–2007), and 2020 Democratic nominee for U.S. House, NC-11 (Democratic)

==== North Carolina state senators ====
- Graig R. Meyer, member of the North Carolina Senate from the 23rd district (Democratic)
  - Meyer published an opinion piece in the Cherokee One Feather, the official tribal newspaper, offering a word of encouragement to the tribe for their efforts to legalize recreational cannabis.

==== Tribal and local officials ====
- Richard Sneed, Principal Chief of the Eastern Band of Cherokee Indians (Nonpartisan)
- Michell Hicks, Former Principal Chief of the Eastern Band of Cherokee Indians (2003–2015), and candidate for Principal Chief in the 2023 Eastern Band of Cherokee Indians Principal Chief election (Nonpartisan)

==== Party officials ====
- Garrett Lagan, Swain County Democratic Party Chair (Democratic)
- Diane Snyder, Cherokee County Democratic Party Chair (Democratic)
- Cody Lewis, Jackson County Democratic Party Chair (Democratic)
- Sam Edney, Transylvania County Democratic Party Chair (Democratic)

Four Democratic Party county chairs released a joint statement in the Cherokee One Feather, indicating their disagreement with Rep. Chuck Edwards on marijuana policy and the referendum, endorsing the right for the EBCI to hold a vote on cannabis.

==== Organizations ====
- Indigenous Cannabis Industry Association
- Qualla Enterprises, LLC, the tribally-owned dispensary of the EBCI
  - In an opinion piece published in the Cherokee One Feather, Qualla Enterprises argued the benefits of legalizing cannabis on tribal land, citing greater social progress, potential job growth for members of the tribe, a potential surge in economic activity, an existing high approval rating of cannabis in North Carolina, and mitigation of the opioid crisis as benefits of legalizing the drug.

==== Individuals ====
- Kevin Caldwell, southeast legislative manager for the Marijuana Policy Project

=== Neutrality ===
==== Tribal and local officials ====
- Teresa McCoy, EBCI Tribal Council member (Nonpartisan)
  - While McCoy authored the bill that proposed the referendum and included several reasons why recreational cannabis should be legalized in it, she herself has indicated that she does not mind whether the referendum fails or succeeds.

== Results and impact ==
=== Tribe-wide ===
Referendum Question #2
Choice	Votes	%
For	2,464	69.98
Against	1,057	30.02
Required majority		50.01
Total	3,521	100.00
Registered voters/turnout	6,716	52.43
Turnout needed		30.00

A labeled map of the communities of the EBCI

=== By tribal community ===
Community	Yes		No		Total	RV	Turnout
Community	Votes	%	Votes	%	Total	RV	Turnout
Big Cove	To be announced		To be announced		To be announced	761	To be announced
Birdtown	To be announced		To be announced		To be announced	1,725	To be announced
Cherokee County	To be announced		To be announced		To be announced	385	To be announced
Painttown	To be announced		To be announced		To be announced	817	To be announced
Snowbird	To be announced		To be announced		To be announced	516	To be announced
Wolfetown/Big Y	To be announced		To be announced		To be announced	1,601	To be announced
Yellowhill	To be announced		To be announced		To be announced	911	To be announced
Total	2,464	69.98	1,057	30.02	3,521	6,716	52.43

=== Impact and significance ===
According to initial unofficial results, the ballot measure passed by a landslide, with roughly 70% of voters in support and 30% in opposition, making the Eastern Band of Cherokee Indians the first area in a Republican-controlled Southern state to successfully act to legalize recreational marijuana—Virginia, at the time it legalized recreational marijuana, was under a Democratic trifecta. The election results were certified on October 2, 2023, however, official, certified tallies have not yet been released. Legal, recreational sales of the drug are scheduled to begin later in 2023. If Virginia, the first Southern state to legalize recreational cannabis, does not act to authorize recreational sales before this time, then the Qualla Boundary will be the first jurisdiction in the South with legal recreational marijuana sales. In spite of this, however, the EBCI would not be the first tribe within an illegal state to have held a referendum to legalize recreational marijuana—before the vote, the Oglala Lakota Nation of South Dakota did so in 2020, and the Menominee Tribe of Wisconsin did so in 2015.

Recreational cannabis may prove to be a significant driver of tourism and revenue on the Qualla Boundary, as it will be the only location for many miles with legal recreational cannabis, and it is already in the vicinity of the Great Smoky Mountains National Park and Harrah's Cherokee Center, two tourism hotspots in North Carolina.

The vote has also drawn significant attention to the issue of medical marijuana within North Carolina as a whole, where pro-cannabis advocates have been attempting to get the issue passed in the legislature for several years. A successful 'yes' vote has been described by the University of North Carolina at Chapel Hill's radio station, WUNC, as having the potential to impact the issue of cannabis across the entirety of North Carolina, due to the attention that has been placed on the referendum by state and local leaders. On the vote, PBS North Carolina director Kelly McCullen asked, "Is that the camel's nose under the tent?" in reference to how the vote, although amongst a small group, may signal bigger changes for the rest of the state for marijuana.

Principal Chief-elect Michell Hicks has planned to restrict the usage of cannabis in the proximity of schools in light of the referendum's passing. Revenue from legal cannabis sales is expected to be used to fund areas such as housing, healthcare, education, and elderly dental care, among others.

=== Potential issues ===
Certain challenges are posed due to the unique legal and geographic situation of the Qualla Boundary.

==== Legal issues ====
The facility which the EBCI has established to grow cannabis is located in an enclave surrounded by land that the State of North Carolina has jurisdiction over. In order to deliver cannabis products to the EBCI's dispensary, employees of Qualla Enterprises would have to leave tribal land, constituting a violation of state law. This issue has drawn the attention of Swain County Sheriff Curtis Cochran, issuing a warning, stating:

“I have had several conversations with the chief, tribal attorney general, and others about the transportation of the cannabis from the Coopers Creek location back onto tribal property. I stated that until North Carolina changes the law, that it is still illegal to possess or transport marijuana on the highway.”

North Carolina Attorney General Josh Stein declined to intervene in the matter, stating “This is an issue that the tribe and local law enforcement will need to work out.”

==== Fiscal responsibility and transparency ====
Tribal chief Richard Sneed expressed concerns over the fiscal impact of the cannabis farm, as Qualla Enterprises has not disclosed how it has spent the $31 million allocated to it to begin business operations. His office noted significant discrepancies in the costs of materials Qualla Enterprises has used and the money that Qualla Enterprises has spent.

==== Preparedness ====
Sneed, although in support of the decision of the tribe, additionally expressed concern over whether the EBCI was ready for recreational marijuana, as the tribe had not yet finished fully setting up their medical marijuana program. In a statement to NBC News, Sneed said, "I feel like we’re putting the cart before the horse jumping straight to adult use having not even had the experience of running a dispensary under a medical program."

==== Proper regulation ====
2023 Principal Chief election candidate Michell Hicks expressed concerns about whether regulations would be implemented to keep the drug away from children, although he supported the measure.

== Reactions ==
=== U.S. Armed Forces officials ===
- Moe Davis, former Air Force official, military prosecutor, and candidate for U.S. House, released a post on Twitter, rebuking Rep. Chuck Edwards' position on the referendum and characterizing the results of the referendum as a rebuke of Edwards' position as well.

=== North Carolina state representatives ===
- Sarah Crawford, Member of the North Carolina House of Representatives from the 66th district, stated on PBS North Carolina's television program State Lines that the EBCI's vote on legalization was on the boundary of affecting the entire state.

=== Local government institutions ===
- Jackson County, which the EBCI is partially located within, had its sheriff's office state that they would likely not place any additional focus on cannabis enforcement in light of the referendum. On tribal land, the Jackson County Sheriff's Office has no authority.

=== Tribal and local officials ===
- Tribal councilmember Teresa McCoy published a statement, reading: "To those of you who supported the Cannabis project, thank you for educating yourselves and voting! You listened, paid attention and you are ready for change in our own town!”
