= Richard Sneed =

28th Principal Chief of the Eastern Band of Cherokee Indians

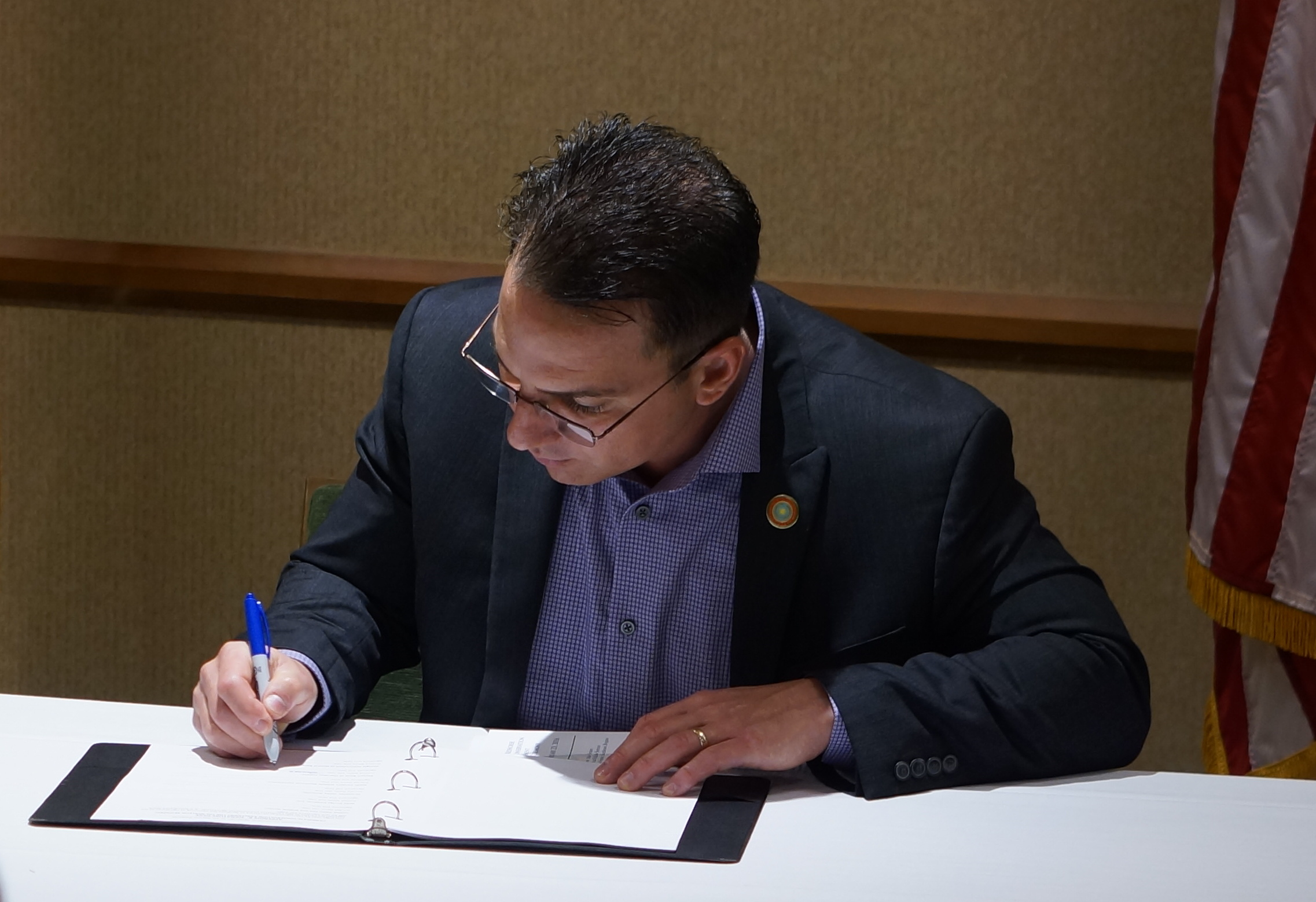

Principal Chief of the Eastern Band of Cherokee Indians
- In office May 26, 2017 – October 2, 2023
- Preceded by: Patrick Lambert
- Succeeded by: Michell Hicks

Personal details
- Born: December 20, 1967 (age 58)
- Spouses: Trina Sneed (divorced): Colene Sneed
- Parent(s): Richard and Patricia Sneed
- Education: Universal Technical Institute; Southwestern Community College
- Occupation: Politician; Teacher

Military service
- Allegiance: United States
- Branch/service: United States Marine Corps

Richard G. Sneed (born December 20, 1967) is a Cherokee politician who served as the 28th Principal Chief of the Eastern Band of Cherokee Indians. Sneed succeeded former Principal Chief Patrick Lambert following Lambert's impeachment, only the second such impeachment since the 19th century.

== Personal life ==
Richard Sneed is a graduate of Cherokee High School in Cherokee, North Carolina. His family is from the Wolfetown Community of the Qualla Boundary. Sneed is a veteran of the United States Marine Corps, and a graduate of Universal Technical Institute in Phoenix, Arizona, and Southwestern Community College in Sylva, North Carolina. He holds a North Carolina teaching license in industrial arts.

Sneed taught vocational classes at Cherokee High School where he was recognized as National Classroom Teacher of the Year by the National Indian Education Association. Sneed has also served as the senior pastor of the Christ Fellowship Church of Cherokee. Sneed and his ex-wife Trina resided in the Birdtown Community of the Qualla Boundary where they raised their five children.

== Political career ==
Sneed began his services as an elected tribal leader for the tribe after winning election as principal vice-chief in September 2015 and assumed office in October 2015. Formerly, Patrick Lambert was serving as the 27th Principal Chief but Sneed began service as principal chief on in May 2017 after his predecessor was impeached and removed by the Eastern Band of Cherokee Indians Tribal Council. In September 2017, Yellowhill Tribal Council member Alan B. Ensley assumed the principal vice-chief title left vacant after Sneed became Principal Chief. Speaking to WLOS in 2017, Sneed most recently called for community "healing" following Lambert's removal. Sneed was re-elected as Principal Chief in 2019 for a full-term, but lost reelection in 2023 to former Chief Michell Hicks.

In April 2023, a law to change the public record status of police bodycam footage to be in line with North Carolina state law was approved unanimously by the Tribal Council and signed by Sneed. Prior to the change, tribal law had given greater access to such recordings.

== Electoral history ==
2015 EBCI Vice Chief primary election
| Candidate | Votes | % |
|---|---|---|
| Richard (Richie) Sneed | 990 | 33.88% |
| Larry Blythe (Incumbent) | 847 | 28.99% |
| Dan McCoy | 652 | 22.31% |
| James (Bud) Smith | 433 | 14.82% |

2015 EBCI Vice Chief general election
| Candidate | Votes | % |
|---|---|---|
| Richard (Richie) Sneed | 2,191 | 59.06% |
| Larry Blythe (Incumbent) | 1,516 | 40.94% |

2019 EBCI Principal Chief primary election
| Candidate | Votes | % |
|---|---|---|
| Teresa McCoy | 1,132 | 42.21% |
| Richard Sneed (Incumbent) | 1,117 | 41.65% |
| Carroll (Peanut) Crowe | 433 | 16.14% |

2019 EBCI Principal Chief general election
| Candidate | Votes | % |
|---|---|---|
| Richard Sneed (Incumbent) | 2,131 | 55.11% |
| Teresa McCoy | 1,736 | 44.89% |

2023 EBCI Principal Chief primary election
| Candidate | Votes | % |
|---|---|---|
| Michell Hicks | 1,075 | 41.73% |
| Richard Sneed (Incumbent) | 548 | 21.27% |
| Robert Saunooke | 441 | 17.11 |
| Gary Ledford | 254 | 9.86 |
| Gene Crowe Jr. | 141 | 5.47 |
| Lori Taylor | 117 | 4.54 |

2023 EBCI Principal Chief general election
| Candidate | Votes | % |
|---|---|---|
| Michell Hicks | 2,254 | 65.03% |
| Richard Sneed (Incumbent) | 1,212 | 34.97% |

| Preceded by Patrick Lambert | Chief of the Eastern Band of Cherokee Indians; 2017-2023 | Succeeded by Michell Hicks |
