= 1976 Texas Senate election =

- November 2, 1976

16 of the 31 seats in the Texas Senate 16 seats needed for a majority
	Majority party	Minority party
Party	Democratic	Republican
Last election	28	3
Seats won	28	3
Seat change	Steady	Steady
Popular vote	1,267,657	485,449
Percentage	72.25%	27.67%
Swing	▼6.18%	▲6.11%
- Senate results by district Democratic hold Republican hold No election
President Pro Tempore before election
Democratic
Elected President Pro Tempore
Democratic

The 1976 Texas Senate elections took place as part of the biennial United States elections. Texas voters elected state senators 16 of the 31 State Senate districts. The winners of this election served in the 65th Texas Legislature for four-year terms.

== Background ==
Democrats had controlled the Texas Senate since the 1872 elections. Long a part of the Solid South, Republicans had gained a foothold in the state in the past two decades, electing U.S. Senator John Tower in 1961 and electing Richard Nixon with 66% of the vote in 1972, but these gains rarely made much impact in downballot, local races. Democrats had controlled every statewide office since the end of Reconstruction and controlled large supermajorities in the legislature. Even these small numbers were an improvement from the past two decades, however, such as after the 1964 election when they held a single seat in the House and none in the Senate.

== Results ==
Although Democrat Jimmy Carter only narrowly won the state in the concurrent presidential election, Democrats held onto all of their seats in the Senate, maintaining their 28–3 supermajority in the chamber. Due to a recent constitutional amendment increasing the term lengths of most statewide officers from two to four years, this was the first general election in 100 years not to feature them on the ballot.

=== Results by district ===
District	Democratic		Republican		Write-in		Total		Result
District	Votes	%	Votes	%	Votes	%	Votes	%	Result
District 4	90,791	100.00%	-	-	0	0.00%	90,791	100.00%	Democratic hold
District 5	105,158	99.97%	-	-	36	0.03%	105,194	100.00%	Democratic hold
District 7	75,902	56.15%	56,923	43.85%	0	0.00%	129,825	100.00%	Democratic hold
District 8	39,352	32.45%	81,911	67.55%	5	0.00%	121,268	100.00%	Republican hold
District 9	77,510	60.59%	50,399	39.40%	8	0.01%	127,917	100.00%	Democratic hold
District 13	57,862	30.32%	132,982	69.68%	0	0.00%	190,844	100.00%	Republican hold
District 15	66,227	59.99%	44,165	40.01%	0	0.00%	110,392	100.00%	Democratic hold
District 16	55,043	50.38%	54,200	49.61%	7	0.01%	109,250	100.00%	Democratic hold
District 17	90,050	99.79%	-	-	194	0.21%	90,244	100.00%	Democratic hold
District 18	85,435	99.97%	-	-	25	0.03%	85,460	100.00%	Democratic hold
District 19	73,016	78.48%	20,023	21.52%	4	0.00%	93,043	100.00%	Democratic hold
District 20	74,914	62.53%	44,846	37.43%	40	0.03%	119,800	100.00%	Democratic hold
District 22	112,238	99.12%	-	-	998	0.88%	113,236	100.00%	Democratic hold
District 24	97,494	99.86%	-	-	139	0.14%	97,633	100.00%	Democratic hold
District 29	69,473	99.90%	-	-	73	0.10%	69,546	100.00%	Democratic hold
District 31	100,192	99.99%	-	-	12	0.01%	100,204	100.00%	Democratic hold
Total	1,267,657	72.25%	485,449	27.67%	1,541	0.09%	1,754,647	100.00%	Source:
