= Michell Hicks =

American and Cherokee politician (born 1964)

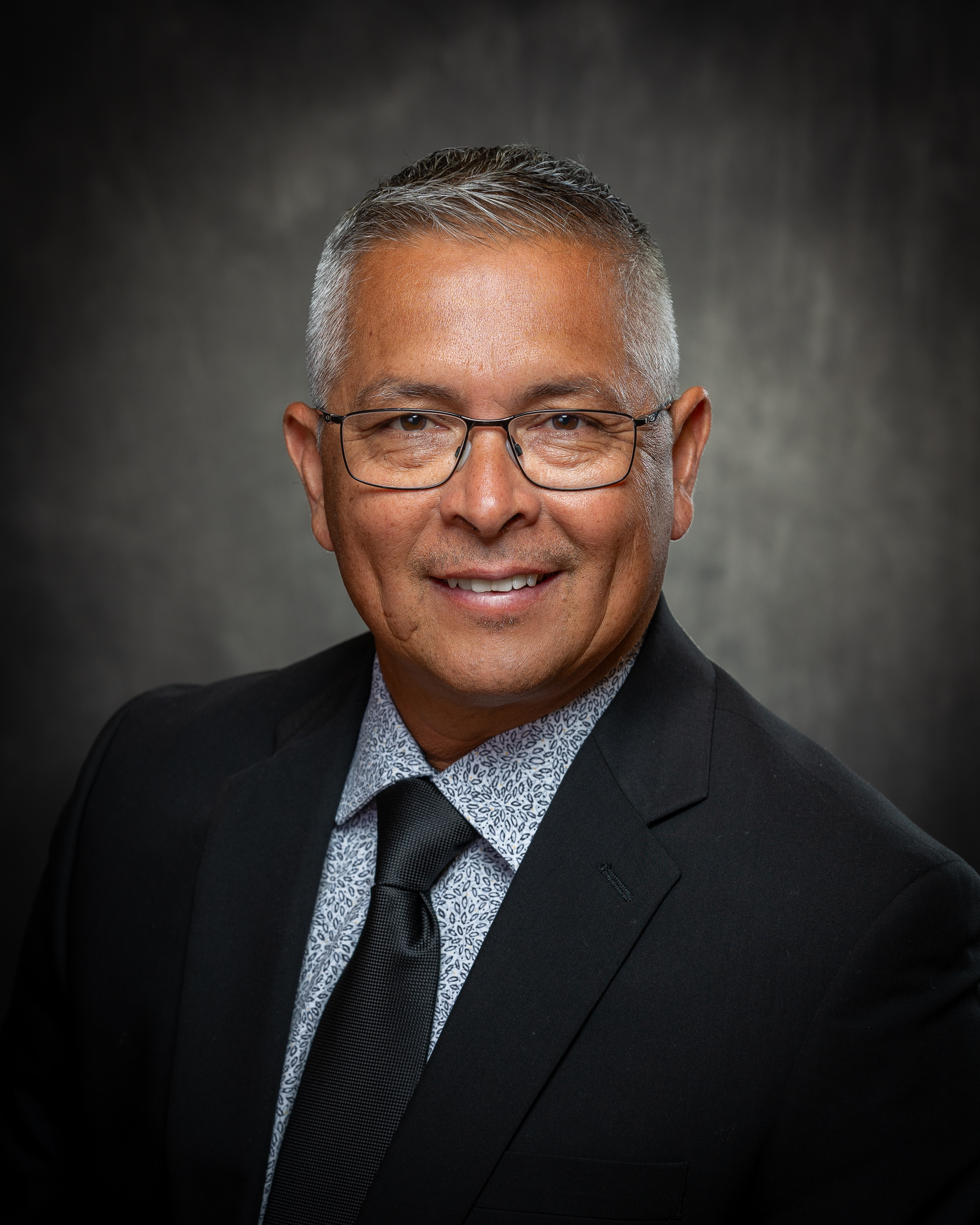
- Hicks in 2023

Principal Chief of the Eastern Band of Cherokee Indians
- Incumbent
- Assumed office October 2, 2023
- Preceded by: Richard Sneed
- In office 2003–2015
- Preceded by: Leon Jones
- Succeeded by: Patrick Lambert

Personal details
- Born: September 8, 1964 (age 61) North Carolina, United States
- Children: 5
- Education: Western Carolina University (BBA); Southwestern Community College
- Occupation: Accountant

Michell Alexander Hicks (born September 8, 1964) is an American and Cherokee politician who has served as the principal chief of the Eastern Band of Cherokee Indians since 2023. He previously served three terms as Principal Chief from 2003 to 2015, becoming the youngest person ever to hold the position at age 38. In 2023, he was re-elected as Principal Chief, marking the beginning of his fourth term. Throughout his leadership, he has guided the 16,000-member tribe through significant economic growth and cultural preservation efforts.

He is recognized as a national leader in Indian Country, known for his commitment to the advancement and well-being of his tribe and community.

== Personal life ==
Hicks was born and raised on the Qualla Boundary, the land trust of the Eastern Band of Cherokee Indians. He has a bachelor's degree in business administration from Western Carolina University. He and his wife Marsha have 5 children.

== Career ==
Prior to serving as Principal Chief, Hicks has also served as the Eastern Band's Executive Director of Budget and Finance.

== Electoral history ==
2023 EBCI Principal Chief primary election
Candidate	Votes	%
Michell Hicks	1,075	41.73%
Richard Sneed (Incumbent)	548	21.27%
Robert Saunooke	441	17.11
Gary Ledford	254	9.86
Gene Crowe Jr.	141	5.47
Lori Taylor	117	4.54

2023 EBCI Principal Chief general election
Candidate	Votes	%
Michell Hicks	2,254	65.03%
Richard Sneed (Incumbent)	1,212	34.97%

== See also ==
- List of Principal Chiefs of the Cherokee

Preceded by Leon Jones	Chief of the Eastern Band of Cherokee Indians; 2003-2016	Succeeded by Patrick Lambert
Preceded by Richard Sneed	Chief of the Eastern Band of Cherokee Indians; 2 October 2023 - Present	Succeeded by Present
