= Cannabis in North Carolina =

Cannabis in North Carolina is illegal for any use except for very limited medical usage, though decriminalized for possession of 0.5 ounces or less for individuals with three or fewer misdemeanor convictions.

== Decriminalization (1977) ==
In 1977, during a short-lived wave of decriminalization in the country, North Carolina reduced the penalty and decriminalized possession of small amounts of cannabis with 0.5 ounces or less to a maximum of a $200 fine. Possession of less than half an ounce is still a Class 3 misdemeanor, the lowest level of misdemeanor, while possession of up to 1.5 ounces is a Class 1 misdemeanor, and more than 1.5 ounces is a Class I felony (the lowest level of felony).

== Failed medical legalization (2014-2023) ==
A medical marijuana bill was introduced in May, 2014, but was killed by the House Committee in March, 2015. Additionally, the House Committee issued an "unfavorable report", which blocks the House from considering bills with medical marijuana components for the next two years. Non-psychoactive cannabis has essentially become legalized, but special seeds of very specific low THC strains (industrial hemp) and licensing must be purchased from the state.

Sen. Bill Rabon reintroduced legislation in 2021, which passed the Senate in 2022 as SB 711, but failed to pass the House. The Senate again passed a medical legalization bill in 2023 as SB 3, but as of July, the House has yet to vote on the legislation, with the Speaker announcing there were no plans to bring it to the floor.

== Legalization of CBD (2015) ==
In 2015, Governor Pat McCrory signed into law HB766, allowing those with intractable epilepsy to use CBD oil. His endorsement followed a House vote of 112–22 and Senate vote of 47–0. The law does not establish any infrastructure for which potential patients may legally purchase CBD within the state.

== Eastern Band of Cherokee Indians Referendum (2023) ==
In September 2023, the Eastern Band of Cherokee Indians, whose laws supersede those of North Carolina, voted to legalize cannabis in a ballot measure by a vote of 70% to 30%. While this does not legalize cannabis in all of North Carolina, it makes the Qualla Boundary, the EBCI's land trust, the first location in the state in which cannabis is legal for recreational use—however, cannabis remains illegal under North Carolina law outside of the area. Major media outlets in the state noted the potential for the referendum to impact the entirety of North Carolina as it relates to the issue of cannabis.
