= 2023 Maine Question 1 =

- Voter Approval of Borrowing Above $1 Billion by State Entities and Electric Cooperatives Initiative

Results
Choice	Votes	%
Yes	259,444	65.46%
No	136,897	34.54%
Total votes	396,341	100.00%
- Yes 50–60% 60–70%

On November 7, 2023, as an indirect initiated state statute, Maine Question 1, the Voter Approval of Borrowing Above $1 Billion by State Entities and Electric Cooperatives Initiative, was put to a vote. This ballot measure requires voter approval before any state agencies, municipal electric districts, electrification cooperatives, or consumer-owned transmission utilities could take on debt totaling more than $1 billion. It also needs the state treasurer to provide a statement outlining the estimated cost of the increased debt to go along with the ballot question. The measure was approved in a landslide victory with nearly a two-thirds approval vote.

== Results ==
2024 Maine Question 1
Choice	Votes	%
For	259,444	65.46
Against	136,897	34.54
Total	396,341	100.00
