= Impeachment in the United States =

Procedure of officially accusing a civil officer

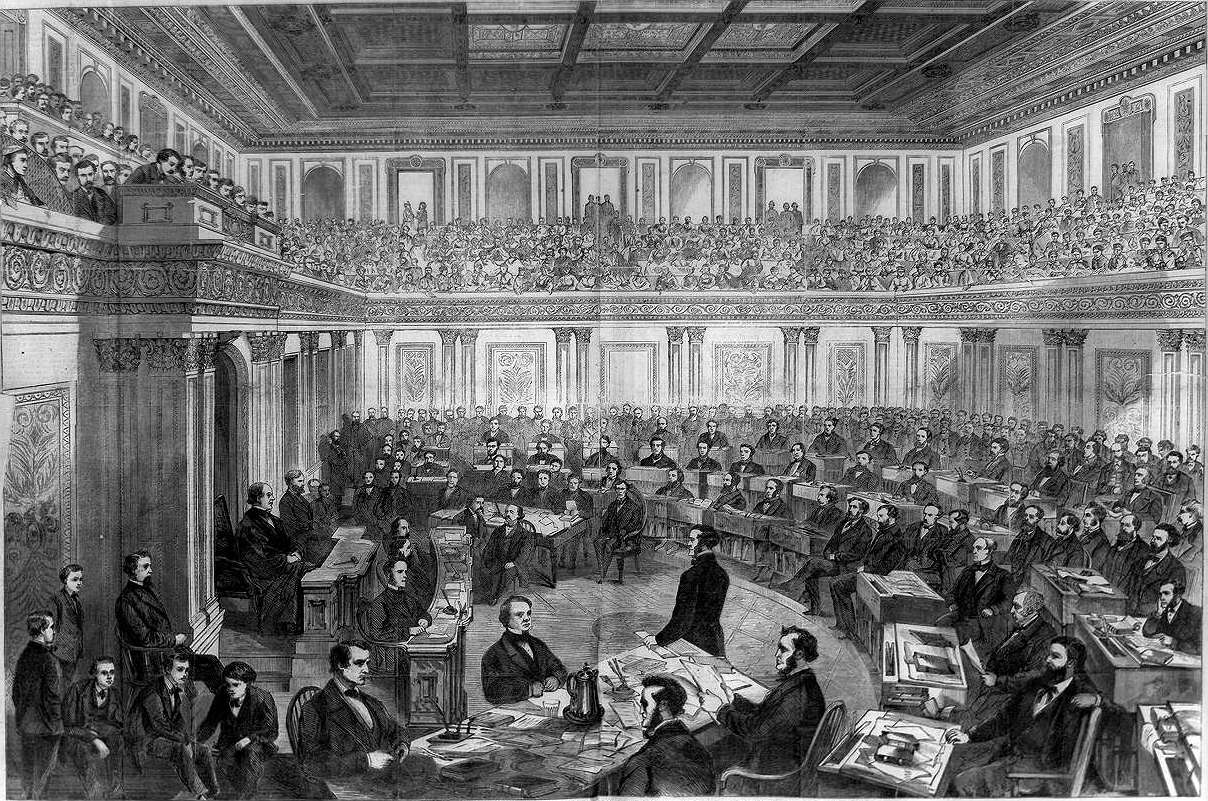
The impeachment trial of Andrew Johnson, the first presidential impeachment trial in US history

In the United States, impeachment is the process by which a legislature may bring charges against an elected member of the executive branch or an appointed official for severe alleged misconduct and may result in removal of the guilty from their position after the consequential trial. In addition to Congress at the federal level, impeachment may occur at the state level if the state or commonwealth has provisions for it under its constitution. Impeachment might also occur with tribal governments as well as at the local level of government. Separate procedures are in place for elected members of the legislature to remove a peer for a comparable level of misconduct.

The federal House of Representatives can impeach a party with a simple majority of the House members present or such other criteria as the House adopts in accordance with Article One, Section 2, Clause 5 of the United States Constitution. This triggers a federal impeachment trial in the United States Senate, which can vote by a two-thirds majority to convict an official, removing them from office. The Senate can also vote to bar an individual convicted in a senate impeachment trial from holding future federal office with a simple-majority vote.

Most state legislatures can impeach state officials, including the governor, in accordance with their respective state constitution. A number of organized United States territories have impeachment processes as well. Additionally, impeachment is a practice of other government bodies, such as tribal governments.

Impeachment proceedings are remedial rather than punitive in nature, and the remedy is limited to removal from office. Because the process is not punitive, a party may also be subject to criminal or civil trial, prosecution, and conviction under the law after removal from office. Also because the conviction is not a punishment, the president of the United States is constitutionally prevented from granting a pardon to impeached and convicted persons, that may have protected them from the consequences of a conviction in an impeachment trial.

== Federal impeachment ==
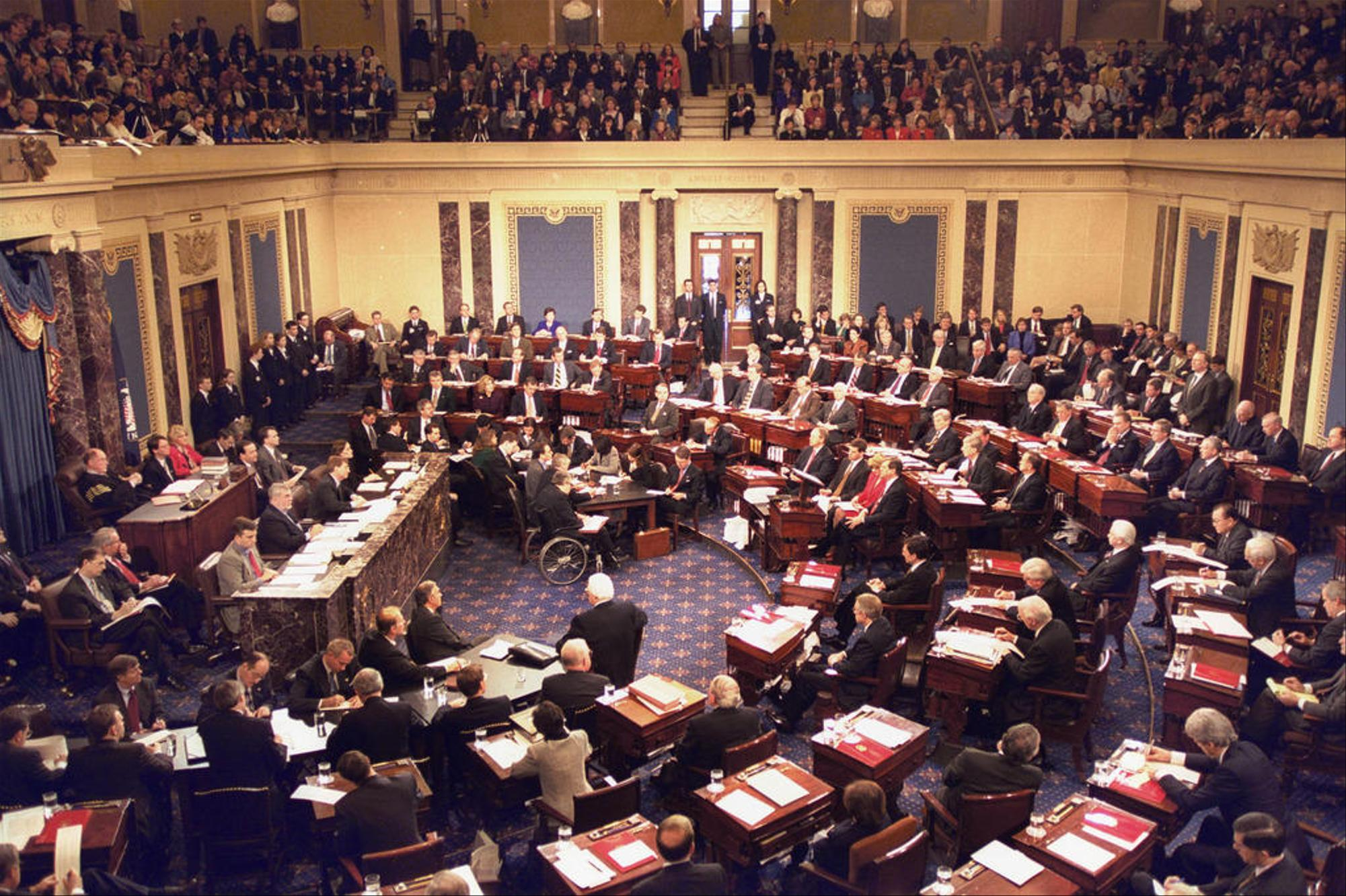
The 1999 impeachment trial of President Bill Clinton, Chief Justice William Rehnquist presiding

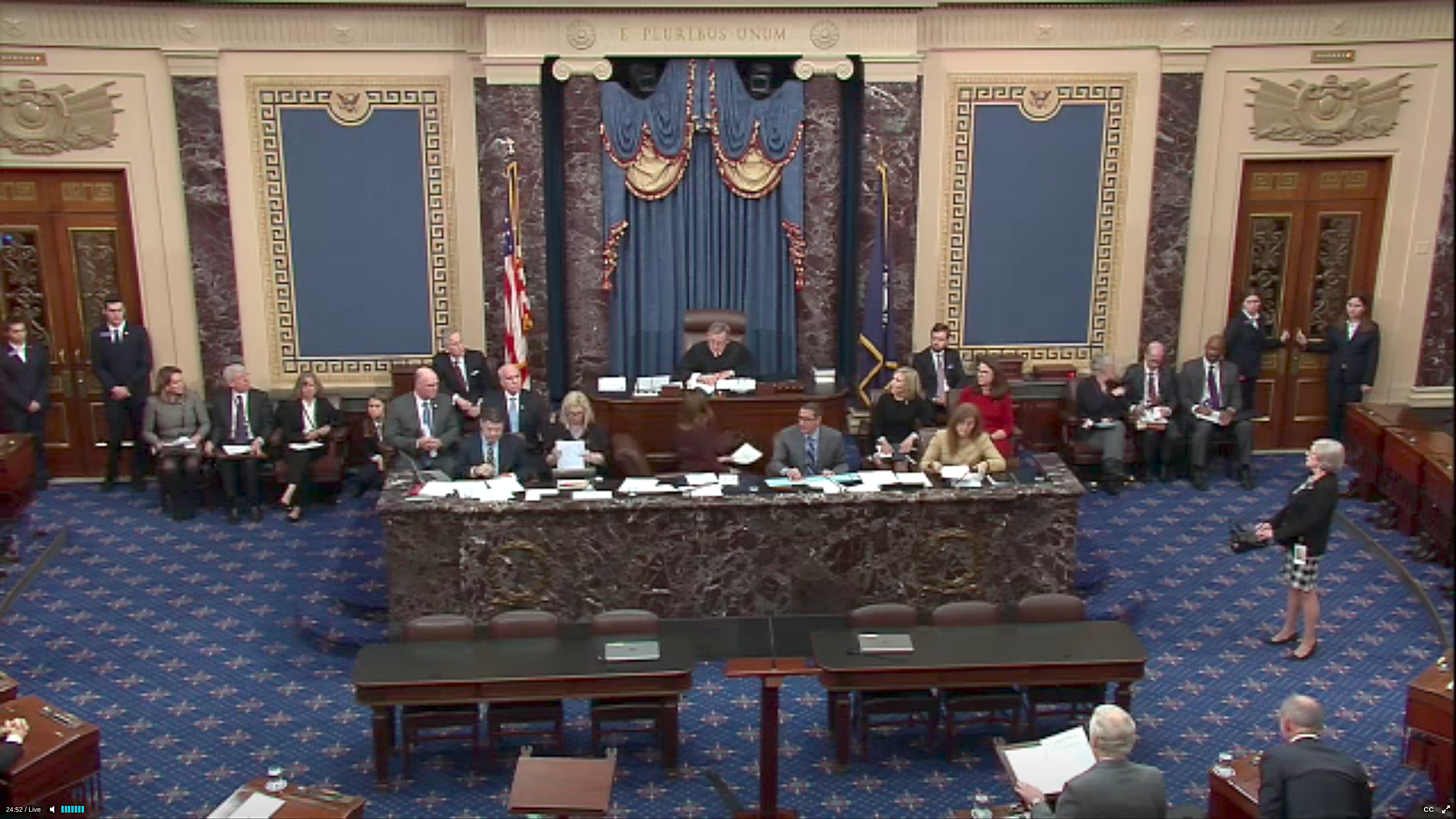
The 2020 first impeachment trial of Donald Trump, Chief Justice John Roberts presiding

=== Constitutional provisions ===
Article I, Section 2, Clause 5 of the United States Constitution provides:

The House of Representatives shall choose their Speaker and other Officers; and shall have the sole Power of Impeachment.

Article I, Section 3, Clauses 6 and 7 provide:

The Senate shall have the sole Power to try all Impeachments. When sitting for that Purpose, they shall be on Oath or Affirmation. When the President of the United States is tried, the Chief Justice shall preside: And no Person shall be convicted without the Concurrence of two-thirds of the Members present. Judgment in Cases of Impeachment shall not extend further than to removal from Office, and disqualification to hold and enjoy any Office of honor, Trust or Profit under the United States; but the Party convicted shall nevertheless be liable and subject to Indictment, Trial, Judgment and Punishment, according to Law.

Article II, Section 2 provides:

[The President] ... shall have power to grant reprieves and pardons for offenses against the United States, except in cases of impeachment.

Article II, Section 4 provides:

The President, Vice President and all civil Officers of the United States, shall be removed from Office on Impeachment for, and Conviction of, Treason, Bribery, or other high Crimes and Misdemeanors.

The Constitution limits grounds of impeachment to "Treason, Bribery, or other high Crimes and Misdemeanors", but does not itself define "high crimes and misdemeanors".

The Constitution gives Congress the authority to impeach and remove "The President, Vice President, and all civil Officers of the United States" upon a determination that such officers have engaged in treason, bribery, or other high crimes and misdemeanors. The Constitution does not articulate who qualifies as a "civil officer of the United States". Federal judges are subject to impeachment. Within the executive branch, any presidentially appointed "principal officer", including a head of an agency such as a secretary, administrator, or commissioner, is a "civil officer of the United States" subject to impeachment. At the opposite end of the spectrum, lesser functionaries, such as federal civil service employees, do not exercise "significant authority", and are not appointed by the president or an agency head. These employees do not appear to be subject to impeachment, though that may be a matter of allocation of House floor debate time by the Speaker, rather than a matter of law.

The Senate has concluded that members of Congress (representatives and senators) are not "civil officers" for purposes of impeachment. As a practical matter, expulsion is effected by the simpler procedures of Article I, Section 5, which provides "Each House shall be the Judge of the Elections, Returns and Qualifications of its own Members ... Each House may determine the Rules of its Proceedings, punish its Members for disorderly Behavior, and, with the Concurrence of two thirds, expel a Member" (see List of United States senators expelled or censured and List of United States representatives expelled, censured, or reprimanded). This allows each House to expel its own members without involving the other chamber. In 1797, the House of Representatives impeached Senator William Blount of Tennessee.

The constitutional text is silent on whether an officer can be tried after the officer resigns or their term ends. However, when the issue has arisen, the House has been willing to impeach after resignation, and the Senate has been willing to try the official after resignation. In 1797, the Senate continued impeachment proceedings against William Blount even after he had been expelled from office, dismissing the proceedings only after determining that a Senator is not a "civil officer of the United States". In 1876, William W. Belknap was impeached by the House of Representatives hours after resigning as United States Secretary of War. The Senate held by a 37–29 vote that it had jurisdiction to try Belknap notwithstanding his resignation, but ultimately acquitted him after trial. The permissibility of trying a former official was a major issue in the second impeachment trial of Donald Trump, which commenced twenty days after Trump's term in office expired, although Trump's impeachment itself occurred while he was president. By a 55–45 vote, the Senate rejected a motion asserting that the trial was unconstitutional.

The Constitution does not limit the number of times an individual may be impeached. As of 2025, Donald Trump is the only federal officer to have been impeached more than once.

=== Process ===
At the federal level, the impeachment process is typically a three-step procedure. The first phase is typically an impeachment inquiry, though this is not a required stage. The two stages constitutionally required for removal are impeachment by the House of Representatives and trial by the United States Senate.

- First, the House investigates through an impeachment inquiry.
- Second, the House of Representatives must pass, by a simple majority of those present and voting, articles of impeachment, which constitute the formal allegation or allegations. Upon passage, the defendant has been "impeached".
- Third, the Senate tries the accused. In the case of the impeachment of a president, the chief justice of the United States presides over the proceedings. For the impeachment of any other official, the Constitution is silent on who shall preside, suggesting that this role falls to the Senate's usual presiding officer, the president of the Senate, who is also the vice president of the United States. Conviction in the Senate requires the concurrence of a two-thirds supermajority of those present. The result of conviction is removal from office and (optionally, in a separate vote) disqualification from holding any federal office in the future, which requires a concurrence of only a majority of senators present.

==== Impeachment in the House of Representatives ====
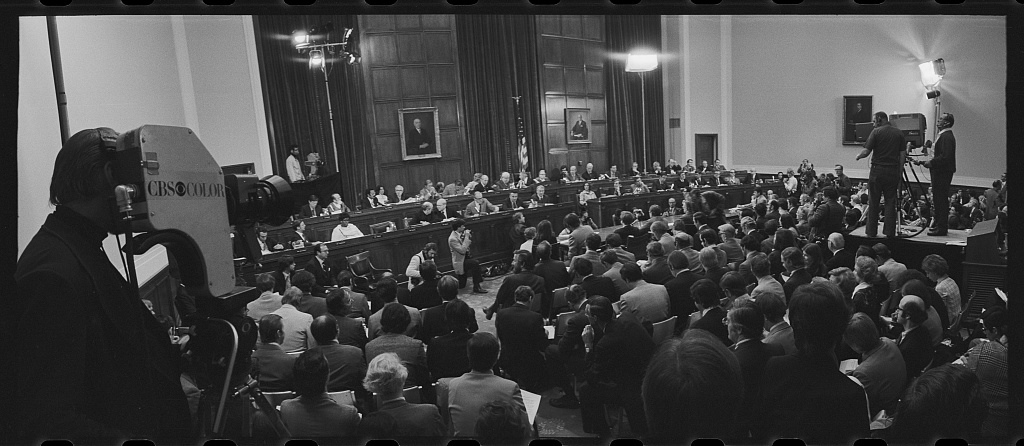
First day of the Judiciary Committee's formal impeachment hearings against President Nixon, May 9, 1974

Impeachment proceedings may be requested by a member of the House of Representatives, either by presenting a list of the charges under oath or by asking for referral to the appropriate committee. The impeachment process may be requested by non-members. For example, when the Judicial Conference of the United States suggests a federal judge be impeached, a charge of actions constituting grounds for impeachment may come from a special prosecutor, the president, or state or territorial legislature, grand jury, or by petition. An impeachment proceeding formally begins with a resolution adopted by the full House of Representatives.

An impeachment resolution may first pass through a House committee before the full House votes on it. The type of impeachment resolution determines the committee to which it is referred. A resolution impeaching a particular individual is typically referred to the House Committee on the Judiciary. A resolution to authorize an investigation regarding impeachable conduct is referred to the House Committee on Rules, and then to the Judiciary Committee. The House Committee on the Judiciary, by majority vote, will determine whether grounds for impeachment exist (this vote is not law and is not required, US Constitution and US law).

Either as part of the impeachment resolution or separately specific grounds and allegations of for impeachment will be outlined in one or more articles of impeachment.

The House debates the resolution and may at the conclusion consider the resolution as a whole or vote on each article of impeachment individually. A simple majority of those present and voting is required for each article for the resolution as a whole to pass. If the House votes to impeach, managers (typically referred to as "House managers", with a "lead House manager") are selected to present the case to the Senate. Recently, managers have been selected by resolution, while historically the House would occasionally elect the managers or pass a resolution allowing the appointment of managers at the discretion of the Speaker of the United States House of Representatives. These managers are roughly the equivalent of the prosecution or district attorney in a standard criminal trial. Also, the House will adopt a resolution in order to notify the Senate of its action. After receiving the notice, the Senate will adopt an order notifying the House that it is ready to receive the managers. The House managers then appear before the bar of the Senate and exhibit the articles of impeachment. After the reading of the charges, the managers return and make a verbal report to the House.

==== Trial in the Senate ====
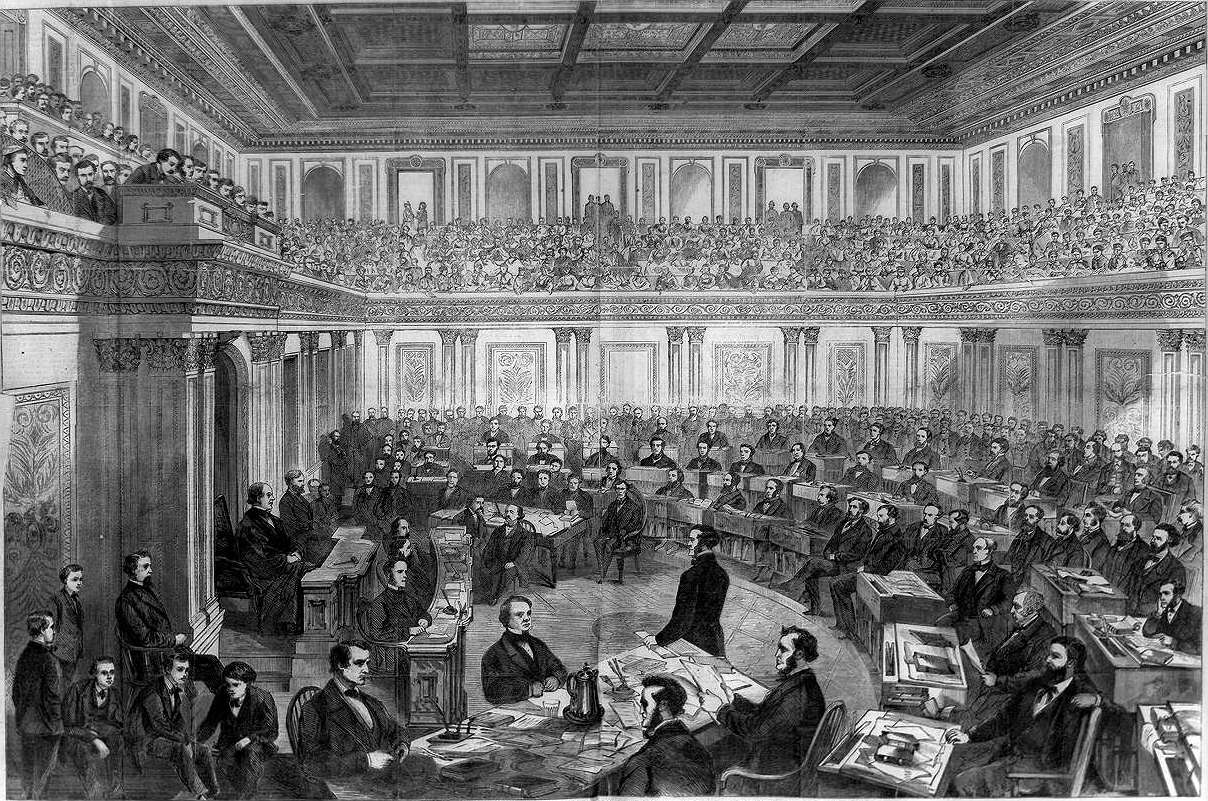
Depiction of the impeachment trial of President Andrew Johnson in 1868, Chief Justice Salmon P. Chase presiding.

Senate rules call for an impeachment trial to begin at 1 pm on the day after articles of impeachment are delivered to the Senate, except for Sundays. There is no timeframe requirement for when the managers must actually deliver the articles of impeachment to the Senate. On the set date, senators are sworn in for the impeachment trial.

The proceedings take the form of a trial, with the Senate having the right to call witnesses and each side having the right to perform cross-examinations. The House members, who are given the collective title of managers during the trial, present the prosecution case, and the impeached official has the right to mount a defense with his or her own attorneys as well. Senators must also take an oath or affirmation that they will perform their duties honestly and with due diligence. After hearing the charges, the Senate usually deliberates in private. The Constitution requires a two-thirds supermajority to convict a person being impeached. The Senate enters judgment on its decision, whether that be to convict or acquit, and a copy of the judgment is filed with the Secretary of State.

Upon conviction in the Senate, the official is automatically removed from office and may by a separate vote also be barred from holding future office. The Senate trial is not an actual criminal proceeding and more closely resembles a civil service termination appeal in terms of the contemplated deprivation. Therefore, the removed official may still be liable to criminal prosecution under a subsequent criminal proceeding. The president may not grant a pardon in the impeachment case, but may in any resulting federal criminal case (unless it is the president who is convicted and thus loses the pardon power). However, whether the president can self-pardon for criminal offenses is an open question, which has never been reviewed by a court.

Beginning in the 1980s with Harry E. Claiborne, the Senate began using "Impeachment Trial Committees" pursuant to Senate Rule XI. These committees presided over the evidentiary phase of the trials, hearing the evidence and supervising the examination and cross-examination of witnesses. The committees would then compile the evidentiary record and present it to the Senate; all senators would then have the opportunity to review the evidence before the chamber voted to convict or acquit. The purpose of the committees was to streamline impeachment trials, which otherwise would have taken up a great deal of the chamber's time. Defendants challenged the use of these committees, claiming them to be a violation of their fair trial rights as this did not meet the constitutional requirement for their cases to be "tried by the Senate". Several impeached judges, including District Court Judge Walter Nixon, sought court intervention in their impeachment proceedings on these grounds. In Nixon v. United States (1993), the Supreme Court determined that the federal judiciary could not review such proceedings, as matters related to impeachment trials are political questions and could not be resolved in the courts.

In the case of impeachment of the president, the chief justice of the Supreme Court presides over the trial. During the second impeachment trial of Donald Trump, some Senate Republicans argued that the chief justice was required to preside, even though Trump was no longer the president when the trial began. However, by a 55–45 vote, the Senate rejected a motion asserting that the trial was unconstitutional. The trial was presided over by president pro tempore Patrick Leahy.

The Constitution is silent about who would preside in the case of the impeachment of a vice president. Constitutional scholar Akhil Reed Amar has argued against the notion that the vice president would be permitted to preside over his or her own trial. As president of the Senate, the vice president would preside over other impeachments. If the vice president did not preside over an impeachment (of anyone besides the president), the duties would fall to the president pro tempore of the Senate.

To convict an accused, "the concurrence of two thirds of the [senators] present" for at least one article is required. If there is no single charge commanding a "guilty" vote from two-thirds of the senators present, the defendant is acquitted and no punishment is imposed.

On April 17, 2024, the Senate trial for the Impeachment of Alejandro Mayorkas, the Secretary of Homeland Security, ended after the Senate dismissed the accusations by agreeing to a point of order that the articles of impeachment did not comply with the United States Constitution. The majority of the Senate ruled that the articles accusing Mayorkas of willfully and systematically refusing to comply with Federal immigration laws and breaching the public trust did not "allege conduct that rises to the level of a high crime or misdemeanor".

==== Removal and disqualification ====
Conviction immediately removes the defendant from office. Following the vote on conviction, the Senate may by a separate vote also bar the individual from holding future federal office, elected or appointed. As the threshold for disqualification is not explicitly mentioned in the Constitution, the Senate has taken the position that disqualification votes only require a simple majority rather than a two-thirds supermajority. The Senate has used disqualification sparingly, as only three individuals (West Hughes Humphreys, Robert W. Archbald, and Thomas Porteous) have been disqualified from holding future office.

Conviction does not extend to further punishment, for example, loss of pension. After conviction by the Senate, "the Party convicted shall nevertheless be liable and subject to Indictment, Trial, Judgment and Punishment, according to Law" in the regular federal or state courts. However, the Former Presidents Act of 1958, which provides a pension and other benefits, does not extend to presidents who were removed from office following an impeachment conviction. Because of an amendment to that law in 2013, a former president who has been removed from office due to impeachment and conviction is still guaranteed lifetime Secret Service protection.

== Impeachment by state and territorial governments ==
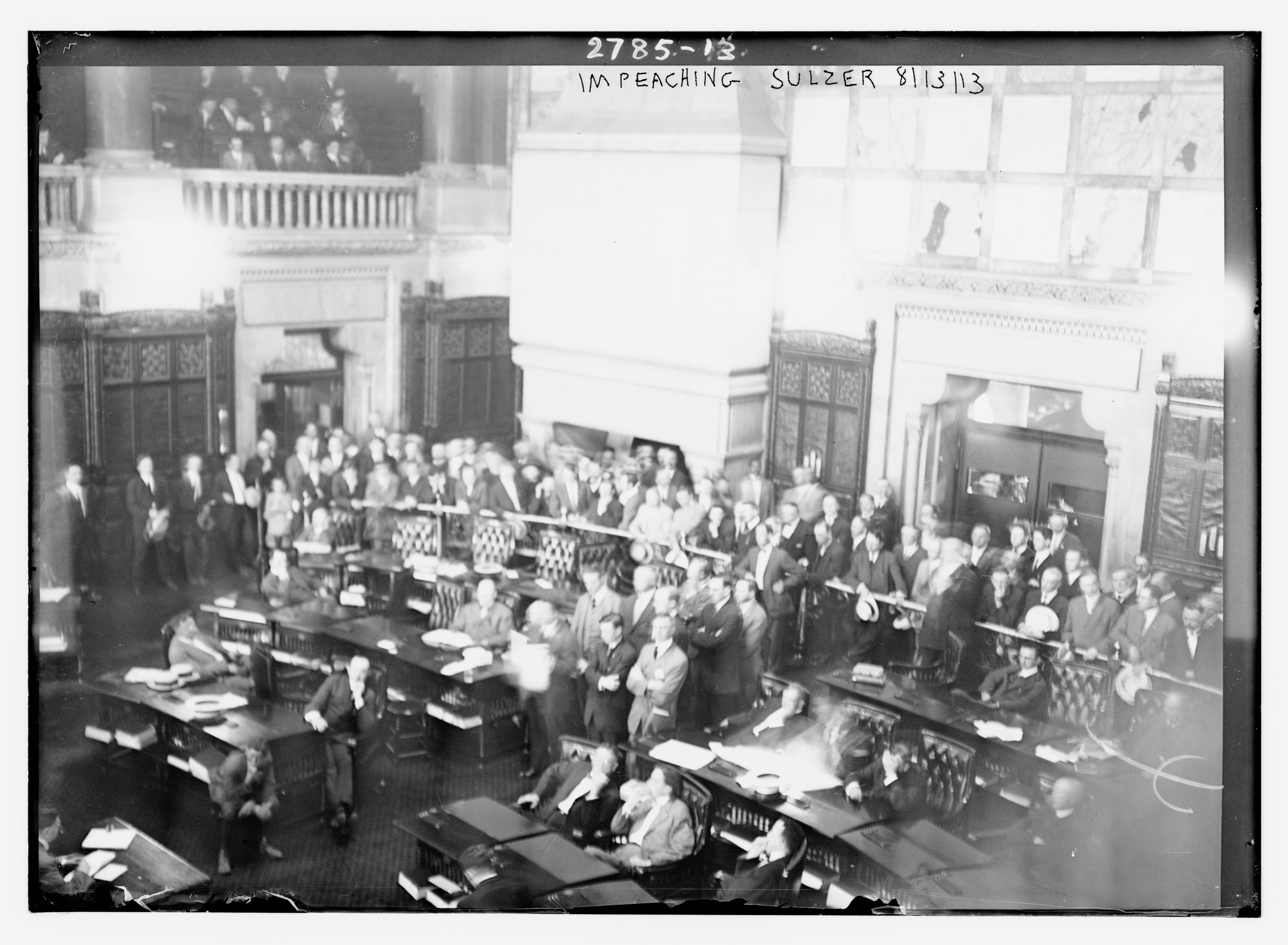
Photograph of a scene from the 1913 impeachment of New York Governor William Sulzer

State legislatures can impeach state officials, including governors and judicial officers, in every state. The court for the trial of impeachments may differ somewhat from the federal model—in New York, for instance, the Assembly (lower house) impeaches, and the State Senate tries the case, but the members of the seven-judge New York State Court of Appeals (the state's highest, constitutional court) sit with the senators as jurors as well. Impeachment and removal of governors has happened occasionally throughout the history of the United States, usually for corruption charges. At least eleven U.S. state governors have faced an impeachment trial; a twelfth, Governor Lee Cruce of Oklahoma, escaped impeachment by one vote in 1912. Several others, including Missouri's Eric Greitens in 2018, have resigned rather than face impeachment, when events seemed to make it inevitable. The most recent impeachment of a state governor occurred on January 14, 2009, when the Illinois House of Representatives voted 117–1 to impeach Rod Blagojevich on corruption charges; he was subsequently removed from office and barred from holding future office by the Illinois Senate on January 29.

In addition, the legislatures of the territories of American Samoa, Northern Mariana Islands, and Puerto Rico have impeachment powers.

The procedure for impeachment, or removal, of local officials varies widely. For instance, in New York a mayor can be removed directly by the governor "upon being heard" on charges—the law makes no further specification of what charges are necessary or what the governor must find in order to remove a mayor.

In 2018, the entire Supreme Court of Appeals of West Virginia was impeached, something that has been often threatened, but had never happened before.

Most states follow the same model as the United States federal government of having the lower chamber of their legislatures hold a vote to "impeach", thereby triggering an impeachment trial held in the upper chamber of their legislatures. However, several states do differ from the convention of holding the impeachment trial in the state legislature's upper chamber. In a reverse, in Alaska it is the upper chamber of the legislature that votes to impeach while the lower chamber acts as the court of impeachment. In Missouri, after the lower chamber votes to impeach, an impeachment trial is held before the Supreme Court of Missouri, except for members of that court or for governors, whose impeachments are to be tried by a panel of seven judges (requiring a vote of five judges to convict), with the members of the panel being selected by the upper legislative chamber, the Missouri State Senate. In Nebraska, which has a unicameral legislature, after the Nebraska Legislature votes to impeach, an impeachment trial takes place before the Nebraska Supreme Court. In addition to all the members of its upper chamber, the state of New York's Court of the Trial of Impeachments also includes all seven members of the state's highest court, the New York Court of Appeals.

== Impeachment by other government bodies and organizations in the United States ==
Other governments and organizations in the United States also utilize impeachment.

=== Tribal governments and other tribal organizations ===
Many tribal governments have impeachment, with tribes generally utilizing a similar bifurcated process to the federal government, having an impeachment vote followed by an impeachment trial. Examples of tribal governments that have an impeachment process include the Pine Ridge Indian Reservation Northern Cheyenne Indian Reservation, Eastern Band of Cherokee Indians, and Oglala Sioux.

The Iroquois (Haudenosaunee) Confederacy's Great Law of Peace, which predates the constitution of the United States, includes what amounts to an impeachment process through which clan mothers can remove and replace a sachem for misdeeds. This is unique in that only a tribe's women are allowed to remove a sachem through this process.

A notable Native impeachment attempt was the 1975 effort to impeach Dick Wilson as chairman of the Oglala of the Pine Ridge Indian Reservation. This immediately preceded the Wounded Knee Occupation.

Examples of Native tribal officials that were impeached include:

- Locher Harjo – impeached and removed in 1876 as chief of the Lower Creeks Muscogee
- Johnathan L. "Ed" Taylor – impeached and removed in 1995 as principal chief of the Eastern Band of Cherokee Indians
- Cecilia Fire Thunder – impeached three times in 2005 and 2006 as president of the Oglala Sioux, removed on third impeachment
- John Red Eagle – impeached and removed in 2014 as chief of the Osage Nation
- Ben Martinez – impeached in 2016 as a member of the Mescalero Apache Tribal Council
- Patrick Lambert – impeached and removed in 2017 as principal chief of the Eastern Band of Cherokee Indians
- Darla Black – impeached and removed in 2019 as vice chairwoman of the Oglala Sioux Tribe
- Joe Brunch – impeached in 2020 as chief of the United Keetoowah Band of Cherokee Indians
- Donna Fisher – impeached and removed in 2022 as president of the Northern Cheyenne Tribal Council

=== Municipal governments ===
Some municipal governments currently or previously have had to power to impeach municipal officials such as mayors. Cities where municipal governments allow impeachment proceedings include cities such as Houston, Texas. An example of an impeachment by a municipal government is that of Philip Tomppert, who was removed through impeachment as the mayor of Louisville, Kentucky by the Louisville Board of Aldermen (city council) in 1865.

=== Other organizations ===
There are other organizations in the United States that have impeachment procedures, including students' union ("student government"/"student council") organizations.

== Impeachment during the Colonial Era ==
Several of the Thirteen Colonies belonging to England that later formed the original states of the United States of America held impeachments. Impeachment was a process carried over from England. Unlike in modern America, but similarly to the practice of impeachment in England, in at least some colonies impeachment was a process that could also be used to try non-officeholders and give criminal penalties. However, in practice, the colonies primarily limited their impeachments to officeholders and punishment to removal from office. Most charges in impeachments were related to misconduct in office. Impeachments in the colonies used a similar bifurcated process to the common modern practice of an impeachment vote followed by an impeachment trial. Like the English impeachment practice and modern United States federal impeachment practice, the charges would be brought by a colonial legislature's lower chamber and tried in its upper chamber.

== Impeachment in independent governments later admitted as states ==
Some states were independent governments before being admitted into the United States. In Vermont, some impeachments took place prior to its statehood.

== See also ==
- Censure in the United States
- Recall election
