= Patrick Lambert =

Principal Chief of the Eastern Band of Cherokee Indians (2015–2017)

Principal Chief of the Eastern Band of Cherokee Indians
- In office 2015 – May 26, 2017
- Preceded by: Michell Hicks
- Succeeded by: Richard Sneed

Personal details
- Born: September 4, 1963 (age 62) Cherokee, North Carolina, U.S.
- Spouse: Cyndi Lambert (m. 1986)
- Education: UNC-Chapel Hill (JD)
- Occupation: Counselor; Gaming Commissioner; Politician

Military service
- Allegiance: United States
- Branch/service: United States Army

Patrick Henry Lambert (born September 4, 1963, in Cherokee, North Carolina) is a Cherokee politician who served as the 27th Principal Chief of the Eastern Band of Cherokee Indians from 2015 to 2017. He also served as the Executive Director of the Cherokee Tribal Gaming Commission for over twenty years. Lambert was impeached on January 18, 2017, and removed from office on May 25, 2017.

== Early life and career ==
Lambert, an enrolled member of the Eastern Band of Cherokee Indians, was born on September 4, 1963, at the Cherokee Indian Hospital on the Qualla Boundary to Henry Ray Lambert and Patricia Sneed Lambert, both from Cherokee, NC. His father, Henry, was a police officer for the Cherokee Indian Police Department for a short time and he worked as a "tribal ambassador", working in full regalia, known as "chiefing". He became known as "Chief Henry" and holder of the title as "World's Most Photographed Indian".

He was very personable and multi-generations of families came back annually to visit him and have pictures taken with him. He continued working as "Chief Henry" for over 35 years and became famous appearing on TV shows, postcards, and was the subject of an article in National Geographic. Chief Henry died in 2007 at the age of 72. Lambert has 5 sisters that all live in Cherokee; his oldest sister, Henrietta, died in December 2016.

Early in his career, Lambert took a job as a drug and alcohol counselor at Cherokee Indian Hospital in Cherokee, North Carolina

== Education and military service ==
Lambert attended Cherokee Indian Reservation School for a short time and also Swain County School. Lambert left high school before graduating and received his GED at the age of 16. Lambert attended school in Sevilla Spain in 1984-1985. In the summer of 1985 he met his current wife, Cyndi and they were married in April 1986. Lambert joined the Army at the age of 23 and attended boot camp at Fort Dix, NJ and Advanced Individual Training at Fort Lee, Virginia, and was stationed in Anchorage, AK. In January 1988, Lambert finished his tour of duty and returned home to serve six years in the Individual Ready Reserve. Returning to Tennessee, Lambert finished his undergraduate work where he earned his dual degrees, BS Sociology and an AS in Criminology, graduating in 1989.

In 1990 Lambert was accepted into Law School at Chapel Hill, North Carolina. He graduated from the University of North Carolina, School of Law with a Juris Doctor in 1993. Lambert returned to the Qualla Boundary following graduation and upon passing the Bar exam he began work for the Tribe as the Tribal Attorney, precursor to the position now titled as the Attorney General. Lambert led the Tribe as legal counsel from in 1994 to 1996 and during his tenure was able to complete the first Tribal State Gaming Compact and the first contract negotiations with a major gaming company to finance and manage a new casino that has proven to be worth billions to his Tribe. In 1996 following the successful completion of adopting gaming legislation and the required National Indian Gaming Commission approvals he took the position as the first Executive Director for the Cherokee Tribal Gaming Commission.

== Principal Chief Campaign ==
Lambert retired in January 2015 after 22 years as executive director of the Tribal Gaming Commission. As a candidate for chief, Lambert said he would start an office of employee rights, deal with the tribe's drug problem, focus on tourism and its economic benefits, and protect the rights of the people as a sovereign nation. He also said the government-owned local newspaper, the Cherokee One Feather, was not truly independent despite the free press act, and he intended to make changes to ensure its independence. As one of five candidates, he received 59 percent of the vote in the June 2015 primary. Lambert won the general election in September 2015 with 71 percent of the vote; the highest vote total ever garnered by a Principal Chief candidate.

=== Internal political strife ===
Lambert suspected previous tribal administration of misusing tribal funds. In April 2016, Lambert presented results of a forensic audit to the Tribal Council. He asked the FBI to conduct its own investigation.

The Tribal Council ordered an investigation of Lambert in August 2016. After the investigation was completed January 18, 2017, the tribal council voted to impeach Lambert. The FBI was also investigating the Qualla Housing Authority, and Lambert stated that he believed this investigation led to the impeachment action. On May 25, 2017, the verdict of the impeachment trial was delivered, with Lambert being found guilty of eight of the twelve articles of impeachment and being removed from office. Vice Chief Richard Sneed replaced Lambert immediately.

Following Lambert's departure from office he promised to continue working for better government for the Cherokee, even if he did not hold office.

== Electoral history ==
2011 EBCI Principal Chief general election
Candidate	Votes	%
Michell Hicks (Incumbent)	2,124	50.66%
Patrick Lambert	1,989	47.44%
Susan Toineeta (write-in)	80	1.9%

2015 EBCI Principal Chief primary election
Candidate	Votes	%
Patrick Lambert	1,751	59.08%
Gene (Tunney) Crowe Jr.	498	16.80%
David Wolfe	453	15.28%
Timmy Ray Smith	165	5.57%
Sam Frell Reed	97	3.27%

2015 EBCI Principal Chief general election
Candidate	Votes	%
Patrick Lambert	2,599	70.99%
Gene (Tunney) Crowe Jr.	971	26.52%
Mary Crowe (write-in)	91	2.49%

Preceded by Michell Hicks	Chief of the Eastern Band of Cherokee Indians; 2015-2017	Succeeded by Richard Sneed
