= 2023 Colorado Proposition HH =

Proposition HH
- Property Tax Changes and Revenue Change Measure

Results
Choice	Votes	%
Yes	642,755	40.36%
No	949,850	59.64%
Total votes	1,592,605	100.00%
County results
For
60–70%
50–60%
Against
80–90%
70–80%
60–70%
50–60%

2023 Colorado Proposition HH is a ballot measure that appeared on the Colorado ballot on November 7, 2023. The ballot measure would have made various changes to the state's property tax law. It was rejected by nearly three-fifths of the electorate.

== Background ==
In May 2023, the Colorado General Assembly placed Proposition HH on the ballot. The proposition was generally supported by Democrats in the legislature, while being opposed by Republicans.

== Contents ==
The proposal appeared on the ballot as follows:

SHALL THE STATE REDUCE PROPERTY TAXES FOR HOMES AND BUSINESSES, INCLUDING EXPANDING PROPERTY TAX RELIEF FOR SENIORS, AND BACKFILL COUNTIES, WATER DISTRICTS, FIRE DISTRICTS, AMBULANCE AND HOSPITAL DISTRICTS, AND OTHER LOCAL GOVERNMENTS AND FUND SCHOOL DISTRICTS BY USING A PORTION OF THE STATE SURPLUS UP TO THE PROPOSITION HH CAP AS DEFINED IN THIS MEASURE?
