= Southwestern Community College (North Carolina) =

College in Sylva, North Carolina, U.S.

Coordinates: 35.3487°N 83.2086°W

- SCC, Southwestern
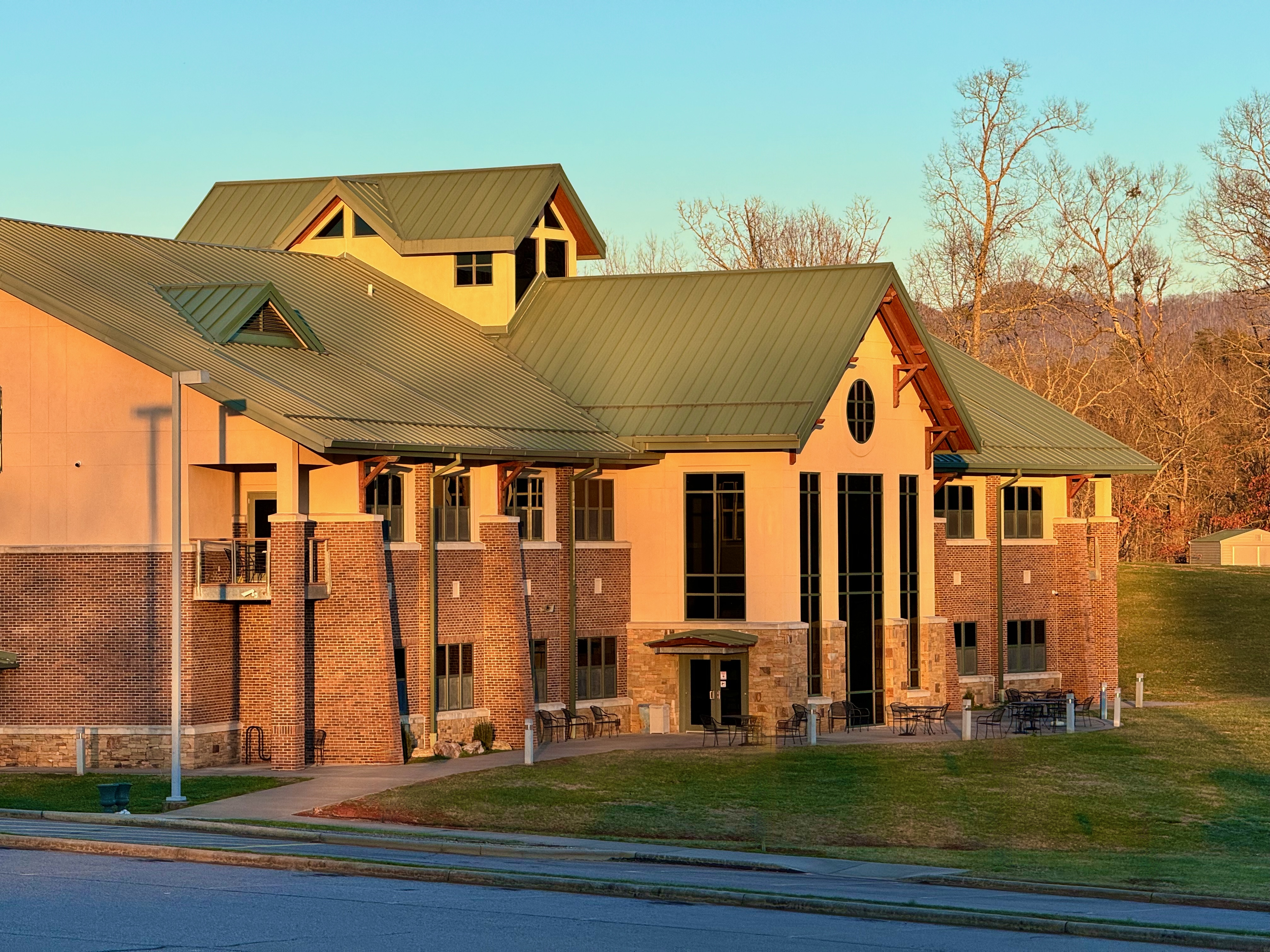
- Former names: Jackson County Industrial Education Center (1964–67), Southwestern Technical Institute (1967–68), Southwestern Technical College (1968–88)
- Type: Public community college
- Active: 1964–Present
- Parent institution: North Carolina Community College System
- Endowment: $2.2 million
- President: Don Tomas
- Students: 8,911 (2010–11 academic year)
- Location: 447 College Dr, Sylva, NC 28779, Webster, North Carolina, United States
- Colors: Blue and burgundy
- Website: www.southwesterncc.edu

Southwestern Community College is a public community college in the town limits of Webster with a Sylva, North Carolina address. It is part of the North Carolina Community College System.

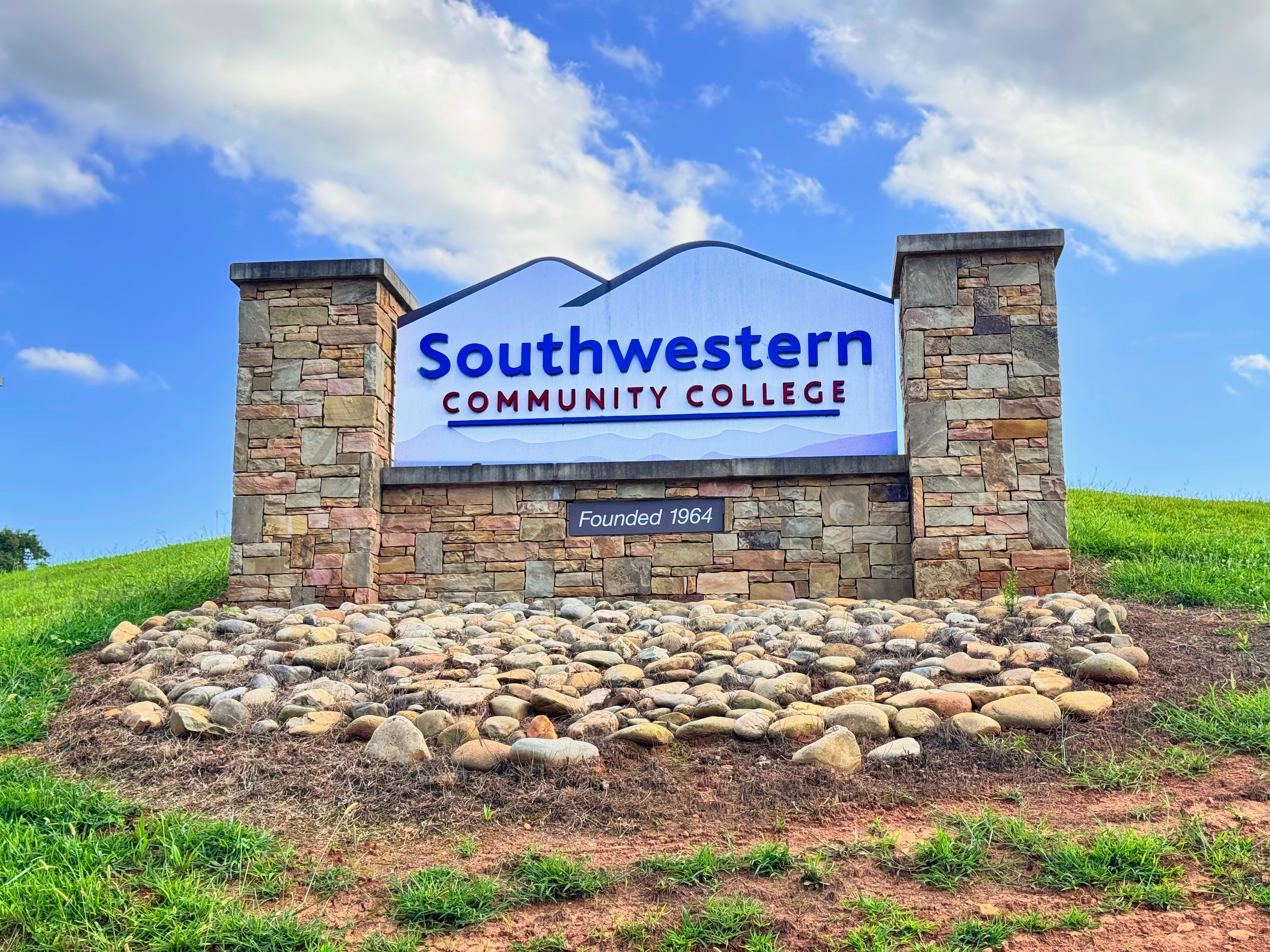
Southwestern Community College campus sign

== History ==
The beginnings of Southwestern Community College can be traced back to April 1961 when a need for skilled textile workers brought representatives of the North Carolina state Trade and Industrial Education Department to Jackson County. The county responded, and began setting up training classes in local schools and in other county locations. The NC Board of Education provided needed equipment and logistics, and began hiring instructors, and an advisory panel was set up from local residents to oversee the project.

The genesis of the idea for a college in western North Carolina came out of those advisory group meetings, and coincidentally, the NC Board of Education was beginning negotiations with the Legislature to begin designating funds for a system of state technical colleges. By 1963, Jackson County had obtained a 17-acre (69,000 m^{2}) site for locating the college, and by May 1964, 90 percent of the block work for the building was completed, with local masonry students providing much of the labor. The students, predominantly local residents who had been taking introductory classes in the previously established trade schools, were ready for hands-on experience.

Work continued on the building until late 1965. The one-story 18,000-square-foot (1,700 m^{2}) structure consisted of five classrooms, four laboratory areas, five instructor offices, two administrative offices, three shop areas, a boiler room, and a coal storage area. The building, appraised at $120,000 when completed, was constructed at a cost of $70,000, principally because student labor helped keep expenses down. Jackson County Industrial Education Center was born as a satellite of Asheville-Buncombe Technical College.

In 1967, it was decided that two other local counties, Macon and Swain, would be included as part of the area which the school served. A new name, Southwestern Technical Institute, was chosen denoting this expanded area of operation, as the school would now be serving the entire southwestern area of the state. Application for independent status of Southwestern Technical College was approved by Governor Dan Moore, and on January 2, 1968, the school began operation under the North Carolina Department of Community Colleges as Southwestern Technical Institute with a budget of $131,000.

In 1970 Southwestern began the process to become accredited by the Southern Association of Colleges and Schools, and received that status in December 1971. It was also accredited by the North Carolina Board of Education in 1972, one of only 11 schools in the state to receive endorsement from both agencies.

Southwestern experienced large growth throughout the next three decades, and evolved into a full-fledged college providing technical training, college transfer, and adult education needs. In 1988, Southwestern Technical College became Southwestern Community College to better reflect its educational role in the community.

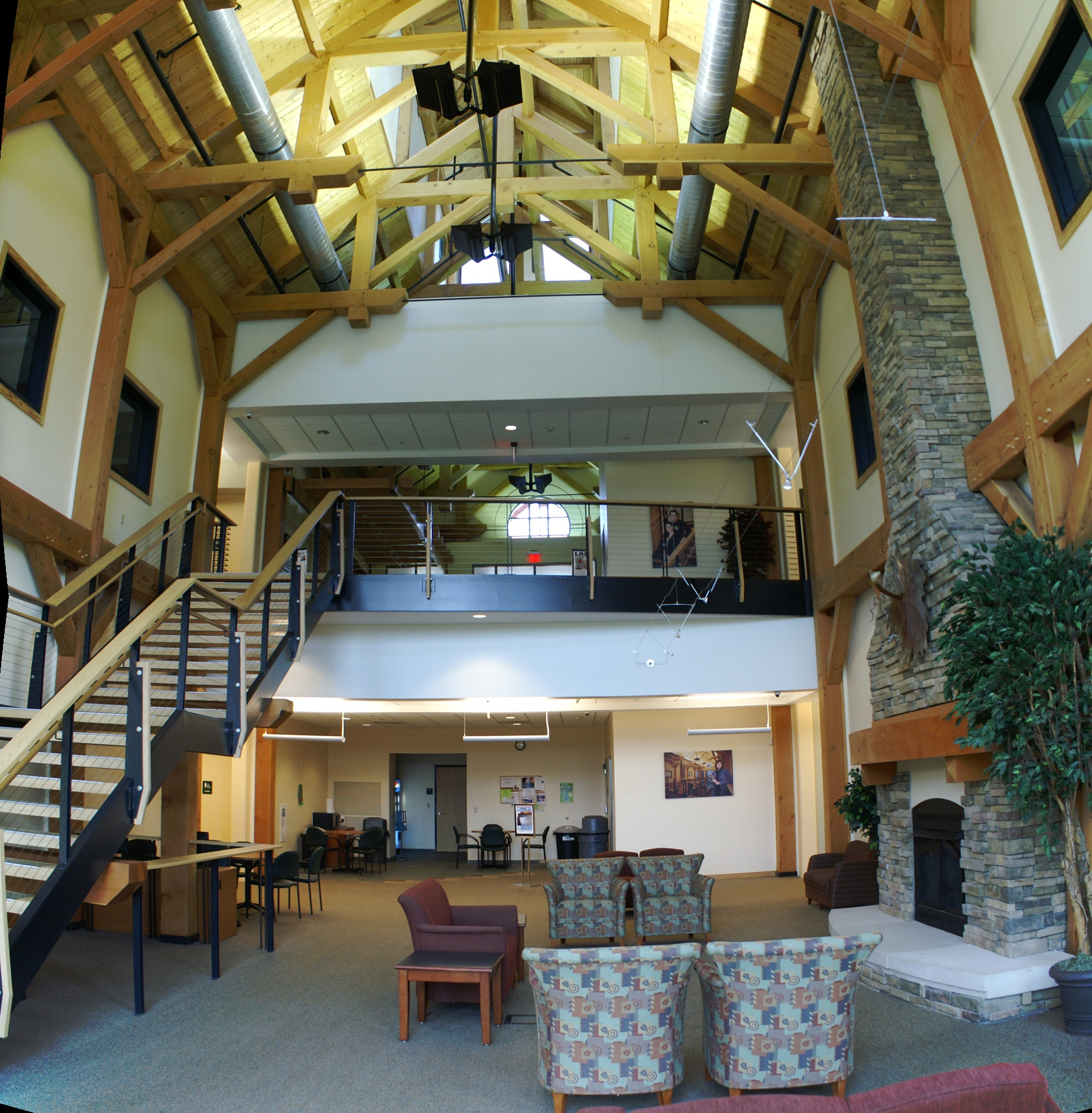
Inside the Macon Campus, 2009.

In 2003 SCC partnered with Drake Enterprises and the Eastern Band of Cherokee to form BalsamWest FiberNET, LLC. This partnership was established in order provide direct network access to Western North Carolina, North Georgia, and Eastern Tennessee, an area which had been experiencing extremely high network access costs, and limited access. Currently the OC192 fiber loop is in final stages of production.

In November 2006, SCC entered into a unique partnership with the Eastern Band of Cherokee Indians that created the Oconaluftee Institute for Cultural Arts (OICA) in Cherokee, North Carolina.

2007 saw the opening of the 23,000-square-foot (2,100 m^{2}) Macon Campus, located in Franklin, North Carolina.

In 2012, OICA became part of the college and still features a focus in Native arts, including printing in the Cherokee syllabary.

Southwestern Community College ranked fourth in the nation in a 2007 listing of America’s best community colleges in Washington Monthly magazine.
