= 1972 Texas Proposition 8 =

Proposition 8
- November 7, 1972
- Four Year Term Of Office For Governor and Other State Officers

Results
Choice	Votes	%
Yes	1,466,291	55.68%
No	1,167,034	44.32%
Total votes	2,633,325	100.00%

Proposition 8 was a referendum for a state constitutional amendment placed on the ballot by the Texas legislature and approved by the voters at the November 7, 1972 general election. The measure amended sections 4, 22, and 23 of the Texas Constitution, changing the length of the terms of statewide elected offices in Texas from two years to four years.

== Full text ==
Be it resolved by the legislature of the State of Texas:

Section 1. That Article IV, Section 4, Constitution of the State of Texas, be amended to read as follows:

"Section 4. The Governor elected at the general election in 1974, and thereafter, shall be installed on the first Tuesday after the organisation of the Legislature, or as soon thereafter as practicable, and shall hold his office for the term of four years, or until his successor shall be duly installed. He shall be at least thirty years of age, a citizen of the United States, and shill have resided in this State at least five years immediately preceding his election."

Sec. 2. That Article IV, Section 22, Constitution of the State of Texas, be amended to read as follows:

"Section 22. The Attorney General elected at the general election in 1974, and thereafter, shall hold office for four years and until his successor is duly qualified. He shall represent the State in all suits and pleas in the Supreme Court of the State in which the State may be a party, and shall especially Inquire into the charter rights of all private corporations, and from time to time, in the name of the State, take such action in the courts as may be proper and necessary to prevent any private corporation from exercising any power or demanding or collecting any species of taxes, tolls, freight or wharfage not authorized by law. he shall, whenever sufficient cause exists, seek a judicial forfeiture of such charters, unless otherwise expressly directed by law, and give, legal advice in writing to the Governor and other executive officers, when requested by them, and perform such other duties as may be required by law, he shall reside at the seat of government during his continuance in office. He shall receive for his services an annual salary in an amount to be fixed by the Legislature."

Sec, 3. That Article IV, Section 28, Constitution of the State of Texas, be amended to read as follows:

"Section 28, The comptroller of Public Accounts, the Treasurer, the Commissioner of the General Land Office, and any statutory state officer who is elected by the electorate of Texas-at large, unless a term of office is otherwise specifically provided in this Constitution, shall each hold office for the term of four years and until the successor is qualified. The four year term applies to these officers who are elected at the general election in 1974 or thereafter. Each shall receive an annual salary in an amount to be fixed by the legislature; reside at the Capital of the state during his continuance in office, and perform such duties as are or may be required by law. They and the Secretary of State shall not receive to their own use any fees, costs or perquisites of office. All fees that may be payable by law for any service performed by any officer specified in this section or in his office, shall be paid, when received, into the State Treasury,"

Sec, 4. The foregoing constitutional amendment shall be submitted to a vote of the qualified electors of this state at an election to be held on the first Tuesday after the first Monday in November, 1971, at which election the ballots shall be printed to provide for voting for or against the proposition: "The constitutional amendment to provide a four-year term of office for the Governor, Lieutenant Governor, Attorney General Comptroller of Public Accounts, Treasurer, Commissioner of the General Land Office, Secretary of State, and certain statutory State officers."

== Legislative approval ==
As provided in Article 17, Section 1 of the Texas Constitution, a proposed constitutional amendment is placed on the ballot only after the Texas legislature has proposed the amendment in a joint resolution of both the Texas senate and the Texas house of representatives. The joint resolution may originate in either chamber. The resolution must be adopted by a vote of at least two-thirds of the membership of each chamber. That means a minimum of 100 votes in the house and 21 votes in the senate.

On April 14, 1971, the Senate voted 22 in favor and 7 against the proposed amendment. On May 31, the House voted 109 in favor and 38 against the proposed amendment, and the ballot was set for November 7.

== Results ==
Proposition 8 passed with 55.7% of the vote, making the amendment valid in the Texas Constitution. In 1974, Governor Dolph Briscoe was elected to the first four-year term for a Governor of Texas.

== Effect on Future Governors ==
Before the passage of Proposition 8, no Texas governor had ever served more than 6 years in office. After its passage, three Texas governors broke that record, with Bill Clements serving eight, Rick Perry serving fourteen, and incumbent Governor Greg Abbott expected to serve at least twelve, and possibly more if he wins his bid for re-election in 2026.
