= 2021 Texas constitutional amendment election =

- November 2, 2021

The 2021 Texas constitutional amendment election took place on November 2, 2021. Texas voters statewide voted on eight proposed amendments to the Texas Constitution. All eight propositions were passed.

== Proposition 1 ==
Proposition 1, the Authorize Charitable Raffles at Rodeo Venues Amendment, amended the state constitution to allow raffles to be conducted at rodeo venues.

Yes The measure passed.

Texas Proposition 1
Choice	Votes	%
For	1,242,625	83.82
Against	239,783	16.18
Total	1,482,408	100.00

== Proposition 2 ==
Proposition 2, the Authorize Counties to Issue Infrastructure Bonds in Blighted Areas Amendment, amended the state constitution to allow counties to issue bond to fund transportation projects in blighted areas, within certain restrictions.

Yes The measure passed.

Texas Proposition 2
Choice	Votes	%
For	931,453	63.09
Against	544,834	36.91
Total	1,476,287	100.00

== Proposition 3 ==
Proposition 3, the Prohibition on Limiting Religious Services or Organizations Amendment, amended the state constitution to "prohibit the state or any political subdivision from enacting a law, rule, order, or proclamation that limits religious services or organizations".

Yes The measure passed.

Texas Proposition 3
Choice	Votes	%
For	925,447	62.42
Against	557,093	37.58
Total	1,482,540	100.00

== Proposition 4 ==
Proposition 4, the Changes to Eligibility for Certain Judicial Offices Amendment, amended the state constitution to change eligibility requirements for various judicial offices in the state of Texas.

Yes The measure passed.

Texas Proposition 4
Choice	Votes	%
For	845,030	58.78
Against	592,585	41.22
Total	1,437,615	100.00

== Proposition 5 ==
Proposition 5, the State Commission on Judicial Conduct Authority Over Candidates for Judicial Office Amendment, amended the state constitution to allow the State Commission on Judicial Conduct to investigate and discipline candidates seeking judicial office in the same manner as they can investigate and discipline current officeholders.

Yes The measure passed.

Texas Proposition 5
Choice	Votes	%
For	852,336	59.23
Against	586,686	40.77
Total	1,439,022	100.00

== Proposition 6 ==
Proposition 6, the Right to Designated Essential Caregiver Amendment, amended the state constitution to "establish a right for residents of nursing or assisted living facilities to designate an essential caregiver, who cannot be prohibited from in-person visitation".

Yes The measure passed.

Texas Proposition 6
Choice	Votes	%
For	1,293,922	87.87
Against	178,665	12.13
Total	1,472,587	100.00

== Proposition 7 ==
Proposition 7, the Homestead Tax Limit for Surviving Spouses of Disabled Individuals Amendment, amended the state constitution to "allow the surviving spouse of a disabled individual to maintain a homestead property tax limit if the spouse is 55 years of age or older at the time of the death and remains at the homestead".

Yes The measure passed.

Texas Proposition 7
Choice	Votes	%
For	1,285,384	87.12
Against	190,109	12.88
Total	1,475,493	100.00

== Proposition 8 ==
Proposition 8, the Homestead Tax Exemption for Surviving Spouses of Military Fatally Injured in the Line of Duty Amendment, amended the state constitution to "allow the legislature to provide a homestead property tax exemption for the surviving spouse of a military member 'killed or fatally injured in the line of duty'", as opposed to the status quo which only allows an exemption for spouses of those designated killed in action.

Yes The measure passed.

Texas Proposition 8
Choice	Votes	%
For	1,291,920	87.76
Against	180,179	12.24
Total	1,472,099	100.00

== See also ==
- 2021 Texas elections
