= 2007 Texas constitutional amendment election =

- November 6, 2007

The 2007 Texas constitutional amendment election took place 6 November 2007.

Sixteen proposed amendments (propositions) appeared on the ballot — all of which were approved by the voters. About 1,088,137 voters statewide went to the polls, out of 12,587,501 registered voters in Texas.

Note: The following summaries are taken from a newspaper abridgement of a Texas Legislative Council summary booklet. Results are unofficial with 99.8 percent of all precincts reporting as of 7 November 2007.

== Proposition 1 ==
Proposition 1 (H.J.R. No. 103) is the constitutional amendment providing for the continuation of the constitutional appropriation for facilities and other capital items at Angelo State University on a change in the governance of the university.

The measure passed 66.28 percent in favor to 33.72 percent against.

- Comments by those in support: The proposed amendment is needed to ensure that, as the governance of Angelo State University is transferred from one university system to another, previously allocated constitutional appropriations to the university will follow the transfer and remain available to Angelo State University and that future allocations of constitutional funding for the university will continue without interruption.
- Comments by those in opposition: During the Regular Session of the 80th Legislature in 2007, arguments were presented opposing the transfer of Angelo State University from the Texas State University System to the Texas Tech University System as proposed by House Bill No. 3564, which passed and took effect September 1, 2007. However, those arguments were directed at the appropriateness of the transfer of the university itself, and no comments were made specifically opposing the clarification of Section 17, Article VII, Texas Constitution, made by the proposed constitutional amendment in the event the transfer took place.

== Proposition 2 ==
Proposition 2 (S.J.R. No. 57) is the constitutional amendment providing for the issuance of $500 million in general obligation bonds to finance educational loans to students and authorizing bond enhancement agreements with respect to general obligation bonds issued for that purpose.

The measure passed 65.85 percent in favor to 34.15 percent against.

- Comments by those in support: The bonds to be authorized by the proposed amendment are essential to meet the growing demand for student loans for students attending colleges and universities, especially as tuition and fees continue to rise rapidly. The availability of student loans is critical to ensure that Texans can obtain the education they need to be productive contributors to the state's workforce. Without the proceeds from the proposed bonds, the Texas Higher Education Coordinating Board will not be able to provide loans to all eligible applicants in the near future. The Hinson-Hazelwood College Student Loan Program is a successful, self-sufficient program, depending not on state tax dollars but on money from student loan repayments, federal interest subsidies, and other sources. While general obligation bonds issued under the student loan program authorized by the proposed amendment do represent debt incurred by the state, the funds borrowed by the state through the sale of those bonds are repaid not by state taxpayers generally, but by former students in the form of loan repayment. Using general obligation bonds to generate student loan funds allows the state to obtain those funds at the lowest cost by leveraging the state's credit without actually drawing on state funds. Bond enhancement agreements will provide the Texas Higher Education Coordinating Board with additional tools to leverage its bonds to maximize the student loan money received from the sale of those bonds. Other state agencies that issue bonds, such as the Veterans’ Land Board and Texas Water Development Board, have successfully used bond enhancement agreements.
- Comments by those in opposition: The state should be wary of adding to its debt by issuing $500 million in additional general obligation bonds for the student loan program, the largest authorization for the program thus far. While the loan program has not required general revenue in the past, unexpected circumstances, such as a sudden increase in student loan default rates, could require the taxpayers to foot part of the bill to repay the bonds. The student loan program funded by the general obligation bonds competes with loan programs already offered by private lenders. Higher education loans will be available through the private lending market regardless of whether the state operates a separate program to offer such loans.

== Proposition 3 ==
Proposition 3 (H.J.R. No. 40) is the constitutional amendment authorizing the legislature to provide that the maximum appraised value of a residence homestead for ad valorem taxation is limited to the lesser of the most recent market value of the residence homestead as determined by the appraisal entity or 110 percent, or a greater percentage, of the appraised value of the residence homestead for the preceding tax year.

The measure passed 71.49 percent in favor to 28.51 percent against.

- Comments by supporters: When the legislature proposed the limitation on increases in appraised value of residence homesteads in 1997 and the voters approved it, the legislature and the voters understood the limitation to prohibit the appraised value of a homestead from being increased by more than 10 percent from year to year. The intent was to provide a circuit breaker that would protect homeowners from the hardship of having their ad valorem taxes increased substantially from one year to the next as a result of appraisal increases. Instead, the limitation has been construed by many appraisal districts that do not appraise property annually to authorize increases of up to 30 percent in the year in which a residence homestead is reappraised for tax purposes. The proposed amendment conforms the language of the Texas Constitution to the legislature's intent when it enacted the original appraisal limitation and the voters’ understanding of the limitation when they approved it.
- Comments by those in opposition: The proposed amendment is unnecessary because appraisal districts in most counties that are experiencing rapid increases in property values already appraise property annually, and the proposed amendment has no effect on appraisal increases in those appraisal districts. While the amendment is intended to protect homeowners from increases in property values from one year to the next of 20 or 30 percent as allowed under current law in appraisal districts that appraise property only every two or three years, in reality those increases are uncommon because property values tend to increase more slowly in those appraisal districts. To the extent that the proposed amendment reduces the ad valorem tax burden of the owner of a residence homestead the value of which is rising rapidly and that is located in an appraisal district that does not appraise property annually, the amendment has the effect of shifting the tax burden to other taxpayers, including owners of commercial property and of homesteads the values of which are rising less rapidly.

== Proposition 4 ==
Proposition 4 (S.J.R. No. 65) is the constitutional amendment authorizing the issuance of up to $1 billion in bonds payable from the general revenues of the state for maintenance, improvement, repair, and construction projects and for the purchase of needed equipment.

The measure passed 58.18 percent in favor to 41.82 percent against.

- Comments by Supporters: Supporters describe the proposed amendment as providing for necessary projects for state infrastructure and homeland security. Projects included in the General Appropriations Act for the current state fiscal biennium, contingent on the approval of Senate Joint Resolution No. 65, include money for deferred maintenance and asbestos abatement generally, for courthouse renovations and historic sites, for state mental health hospitals, for mental health state schools, for maintenance at readiness centers for emergency response, for repairs and maintenance at the Texas National Guard’s Camp Mabry, for new state prison facilities and repair and rehabilitation of existing facilities, for a new regional office and crime lab in Lubbock for the Department of Public Safety, for Department of Public Safety crime lab expansions, for Department of Public Safety offices in McAllen and Rio Grande City, for construction of a new facility and at existing facilities of the Texas Youth Commission, and for the Parks and Wildlife Department for the Battleship Texas and for statewide park repairs.
- Comments by opponents: Some observers have noted that the chosen uses of the proposed bond proceeds have not been publicly reviewed and evaluated adequately to ensure that the uses fulfill valid needs of the state. In regard to prison spending, it has been claimed that additional prison facilities are not necessary and that the state currently has difficulty maintaining adequate staff for prisons already constructed.

== Proposition 5 ==
Proposition 5 (S.J.R. No. 44) is the constitutional amendment authorizing the legislature to permit the voters of a municipality having a population of less than 10,000 to authorize the governing body of the municipality to enter into an agreement with an owner of real property in or adjacent to an area in the municipality that has been approved for funding under certain programs administered by the Texas Department of Agriculture under which the parties agree that all ad valorem taxes imposed on the owner's property may not be increased for the first five tax years after the tax year in which the agreement is entered into.

The measure passed 66 percent in favor to 34 percent against.

- Comments by supporters: Senate Joint Resolution No. 44 would provide eligible small cities a tool to create incentives for private property owners to renovate downtown buildings and improve downtown properties in conjunction with other downtown revitalization efforts undertaken by those cities. The temporary limitation on tax increases would allow smaller cities for which economic development options such as tax increment financing or tax abatements may not be feasible to achieve the same effect. With only a small number of properties eligible for the limitation on property tax increases, the fiscal impact is expected to be neutral during the five-year limitation period. After the expiration of that limitation period, the political subdivisions that tax those buildings or properties are expected to see a positive fiscal impact because of taxes imposed on the increased value of those buildings and property.
- Comments by opponents: Property owners who receive the benefit of infrastructure improvements funded through the Texas Department of Agriculture grant programs should be required to pay taxes imposed on any resulting increase in the value of their property. Furthermore, to the extent the amendment permits the legislature to reduce the tax burden of those property owners, the amendment may result in a shift of that tax burden to other property owners. In a smaller city, that effect would be more pronounced because the shifted tax burden would be borne by a smaller number of taxpaying property owners.

== Proposition 6 ==
Proposition 6 (H.J.R. No. 54) is the constitutional amendment authorizing the legislature to exempt from ad valorem taxation one motor vehicle owned by an individual and used in the course of the owner's occupation or profession and also for personal activities of the owner.

The measure passed 73.69 percent in favor to 26.31 percent against.

- Comments by supporters: The proposed amendment would remedy inconsistency in the taxation of personal motor vehicles also used for the production of income and allows the will of the legislature in enacting House Bill No. 809 in 2005 to have its desired effect. Because the motor vehicles affected by the proposed amendment were exempted from rendition for taxation by House Bill No. 809, most of those vehicles go untaxed. Current law allows an appraiser to harass a property owner by taxing motor vehicles that are exempt from rendition. It is clear that the legislature exempted these vehicles from rendition with the intent to exempt them from taxation. By limiting this exemption to one motor vehicle per individual owner, the proposed amendment allays concerns that a fleet of motor vehicles could be exempted from taxation by a person who uses each vehicle for personal use for a short time each year.
- Comments by opponents: The proposed constitutional amendment would exempt from taxation many motor vehicles used in the production of income by their owners. Exempting such commercial property from taxation runs counter to the long-standing public policy in Texas that all personal property used for the production of income, including motor vehicles, be taxed. A vehicle used predominantly for business should not be exempt merely because it is used for occasional personal purposes.

== Proposition 7 ==
Proposition 7 (H.J.R. No. 30) is the constitutional amendment to allow governmental entities to sell property acquired through eminent domain back to the previous owners at the price the entities paid to acquire the property.

The measure passed 80.30 percent in favor to 19.70 percent against.

- Comments by supporters: House Joint Resolution No. 30 would allow property to be sold back to property owners whose property was acquired through eminent domain under certain conditions at the price the condemning entity paid for the property. Private property rights are some of the most fundamental rights we have as individuals in this country. If there is going to be an imbalance related to the acquisition of private property for public use, the balance should be in favor of the private property owner, not the state. There is something fundamentally wrong with forcing a private property owner to pay more for the owner's former property than the government paid for it when the government acquired it, even though the value of the property may have increased. House Joint Resolution No. 30 will give a governmental entity an incentive to be more specific as to the purpose for which the entity is acquiring private property and prevent the entity from benefiting from the acquisition after it has failed to use the property for the purpose for which the property was acquired.
- Comments by opponents: House Joint Resolution No. 30 would give property owners a financial windfall because selling property to previous property owners at the price the governmental entity paid for that property does not account for: (1) any increased value in the property; (2) property taxes and other maintenance costs for the property that have accrued between the time the property was acquired and the time a condition was met for repurchase; and (3) the cost, including the cost for bonds and enhancing the property, paid by the governmental entity for the property. The proposed amendment also would create a disincentive for a property owner to negotiate a deal with a governmental entity because the option of repurchase is only available to a property owner whose property was condemned by eminent domain, not to an owner who negotiated a deal with the governmental entity in a voluntary transaction.

== Proposition 8 ==
Proposition 8 (H.J.R. No. 72) is the constitutional amendment to clarify certain provisions relating to the making of a home equity loan and use of home equity loan proceeds.

The measure passed 77.55 percent in favor to 22.45 percent against.

- Comments by supporters: Recent interpretations of home equity lending law by the Finance Commission of Texas and court cases have created a lot of uncertainty in that area of law that the proposed amendment is intended to address. Additional clarity is especially important because mistakes in following the legal technicalities of the law can result in invalidating a loan. The proposed amendment more closely reflects the actual business practices of lenders while protecting borrowers from unscrupulous practices. Hurricane Rita and Hurricane Katrina have shown that flexibility is needed in the one-year waiting period between home equity loans, so that borrowers can access the equity in their homes to finance repair of damages caused during a declared state of emergency.
- Comments by opponents: Opponents agree that a constitutional amendment is necessary to address uncertainties in the law but disagree as to what uncertainties should be addressed and how the law should be changed. The amendment fails to address crucial issues, such as what charges are subject to the constitutional fee cap and whether an application for a home equity loan may be taken orally. Because the courts tend to favor lenders on these issues, failure of the amendment to address the issues is the same as settling the issues in the lenders’ favor to the detriment of borrowers. Moreover, the amendment does not provide enough protection to home equity line of credit borrowers, who are enticed into taking advances on the loan by the use of preprinted checks.

== Proposition 9 ==
Proposition 9 (S.J.R. No. 29) is the constitutional amendment authorizing the legislature to exempt all or part of the residence homesteads of certain totally disabled veterans from ad valorem taxation and authorizing a change in the manner of determining the amount of the existing exemption from ad valorem taxation to which a disabled veteran is entitled.

The measure passed 90.87 percent in favor to 9.13 percent against.

- Comments by supporters: A veteran with a disability rating of 100 percent or totally disabled is unemployable and has limited means of earning an income. Under current law, such a veteran qualifies for an exemption from ad valorem taxation of only up to $12,000 of the value of the person's property, which the person may apply to the person's residence homestead or another property, but which no longer provides significant relief from ever-increasing ad valorem taxes. A full exemption would ensure that those who have sacrificed so much for their country are not forced to sell their homes because they cannot afford to pay the taxes on them. The exemption would not have a significant effect on the revenue available to local governments because only a very few veterans will be eligible for the exemption. Increasing the amount of the exemption for veterans with less than a 100 percent disability rating ensures that those veterans also receive the exemptions that the legislature and the voters intended when the current constitution and the Tax Code provisions were originally adopted to provide for ad valorem tax exemptions for the property of disabled veterans.
- Comments by opponents: A total exemption from ad valorem taxation of the residence homesteads of veterans with a disability rating of 100 percent or totally disabled would significantly reduce the revenue available to local governments and would require the state to provide additional state funds to school districts to the extent that the exemption reduces the amount of ad valorem tax revenue collected by school districts. The fiscal impact of the proposed changes will be more significant due to the number of disabled veterans returning from action in Afghanistan and Iraq. Allowing certain disabled veterans to qualify for the ad valorem tax exemptions to which disabled veterans in higher disability rating categories are entitled would likewise cost the state and local governments.

== Proposition 10 ==
Proposition No. 10 (H.J.R. No. 69) is the constitutional amendment to abolish the constitutional authority for the office of inspector of hides and animals.

The measure passed 76.55 percent in favor to 23.45 percent against.

- Comments by supporters: No one currently holds the office of inspector of hides and animals in any Texas county. The amendment will clean up the Texas Constitution by removing archaic references to the office. All functions formerly performed by the inspector of hides and animals are currently being performed by other entities. Animal health inspectors inspect hides and animals to control animal diseases. Inspectors from the Texas and Southwestern Cattle Raisers Association inspect cattle to prevent theft.
- Comments by opponents: No comments opposing the amendment were made during the house and senate committee hearings or during discussion of the amendment in the house and senate chambers. Opponents to Proposition 10 organized a Web site campaign entitled "Save Our Hides". Students from Austin Community College rallied against Proposition 10 at the Texas Capitol 26 October 2007.

== Proposition 11 ==
Proposition 11 (H.J.R. No. 19) is the constitutional amendment to require that a record vote be taken by a house of the legislature on final passage of any bill, other than certain local bills, of a resolution proposing or ratifying a constitutional amendment, or of any other nonceremonial resolution, and to provide for public access on the Internet to those record votes.

The measure passed 84.51 percent in favor to 15.49 percent against.

- Comments by supporters: The passage of important or even routine legislation by voice vote or other non-record vote deprives the public of the right to know how its elected representatives stand on that legislation. Voting on legislation is the most important official action a legislator takes. Legislators cannot be held fully accountable by the voters of their districts if their votes on legislation are not fully recorded and made readily available for public scrutiny. Even when record votes are taken, finding those votes in the house and senate journals requires tedious research that is difficult even for an expert. The proposed amendment would ensure that every legislator's complete voting record on bills and proposed constitutional amendments is a matter of public record and is readily available on the Internet to all interested persons.
- Comments by opponents: Many of the most important legislative actions on a bill or resolution take place before the final vote on the measure occurs, as the scope and details of the measure are being debated and developed. The proposed amendment is insufficient because it fails to require the recording of all votes on preliminary approval of a bill or resolution, which is arguably the most critical phase in the passage of legislation, as well as votes on amendments, substitutes, and critical procedural decisions such as a motion to table or postpone a bill or to take a bill up out of its regular order.

== Proposition 12 ==
Proposition 12 (S.J.R. No. 64) is the constitutional amendment providing for the issuance of general obligation bonds by the Texas Transportation Commission in an amount not to exceed $5 billion to provide funding for highway improvement projects.

The measure passed 62.61 percent in favor to 37.39 percent against.

- Comments by supporters: The proposed amendment would help the state finance transportation projects. There is not enough money to cover existing and future transportation needs with available funding. An expanding population has created the need to spend more on transportation projects and maintenance to correct existing and future problems relating to traffic congestion, including congestion at border crossings, deficient roads, and unsafe bridges. Borrowing against future revenue would enable the state to complete transportation projects sooner, aiding economic development and job creation. The proposed amendment also would provide a new source of revenue that the state could use to secure bonds for transportation projects. The bonds would not have a significant effect on the state's fiscal standing because Texas has a comparatively low debt burden. Bonds backed by general revenue likely would have a lower interest rate than those backed by the state highway fund because the bonds are backed by the full faith and credit of the state. Texas has traditionally used general obligation bonds to fund various types of infrastructure in this state and should use them for funding transportation infrastructure as well.
- Comments by opponents: Borrowing increases the state's costs and transfers those costs to future taxpayers and legislatures. The state cannot afford to pay the interest on the bonds authorized by the proposed amendment, even with low rates. The policy of the state has traditionally been to fund transportation projects through dedicated funds and minimize burdens on general revenue for debt service; therefore, the state should continue to pay for the highway construction it can afford rather than encumber scant resources and drive up the cost of already expensive projects. Some opponents question trusting the Texas Department of Transportation because they believe the agency has not been forthright regarding its expenditures, and it would be irresponsible to provide the agency with even more money not subject to the legislature's appropriations process. Transportation projects should be funded through the state highway fund and not general revenue. It is not in the state's best interest to obligate money to debt service for highway construction bonds when that money may be needed for other state purposes or budget certification.

== Proposition 13 ==
Proposition 13 (H.J.R. No. 6) is the constitutional amendment authorizing the denial of bail to a person who violates certain court orders or conditions of release in a felony or family violence case.

The measure passed 83.85 percent in favor to 16.15 percent against.

- Comments by supporters: The proposed amendment would allow a judge to determine whether a defendant poses an unacceptable threat to a victim of domestic violence or to the community and, if so, to deny the defendant bail, which would protect the victim and the community in a way that a bail bond, community monitoring, or electronic monitoring could not. Domestic situations are often inherently volatile and subject to rapid escalation of violence. The denial of bail may be the only means to ensure victim or community safety in cases in which the defendant is willing to violate conditions of release or court orders.
- Comments by opponents: The right to bail is an important constitutional right that should not be taken away lightly, particularly in the absence of an act of violence or a threat. Amending the constitution to authorize a denial of bail establishes a means to punish defendants through confinement before they are found guilty by a jury. The right to bail is also an invaluable tool in preventing jail overcrowding. The proposal is specific to family violence. While abhorrent, family violence is dealt with adequately in other sections of the Penal Code. Punishing an offense based on the victim's status represents a retreat from the reforms made to the Penal Code in the mid-1990s, which emphasized the seriousness of the criminal act rather than the status of the victim.

== Proposition 14 ==
Proposition 14 (H.J.R. No. 36) is the constitutional amendment permitting a justice or judge who reaches the mandatory retirement age while in office to serve the remainder of the justice's or judge's current term.

The measure passed 75 percent in favor to 25 percent against.

- Comments by supporters: Allowing a justice or judge to complete the term of office to which the individual was elected fulfills the intent of the electorate. A justice or judge is elected to serve a specific term of office, and in electing the justice or judge the voters have expressed a desire for the justice or judge to serve the entire term of office. Requiring a justice or judge to retire mid-term disrupts the efficient and orderly administration of justice. Immediate retirement requires cases being handled by the justice or judge to be delayed while a temporary justice or judge is selected. A case also may be delayed if a new justice or judge is elected and takes over a case from the temporary judge. The amendment includes a limited exception that treats a justice or judge elected to a six-year term of office in the same manner as a justice or judge elected to a four-year term of office.
- Comments by opponents: Mandatory retirement is a way to remove an aging justice or judge who is continuing to serve despite ineffectiveness. The protections of incumbency often make it difficult to remove an aging justice or judge. Timely retirement on reaching the mandatory age ensures a capable and alert judiciary for the state.

== Proposition 15 ==
Proposition 15 (H.J.R. No. 90) is the constitutional amendment requiring the creation of the Cancer Prevention and Research Institute of Texas and authorizing the issuance of up to $3 billion in bonds payable from the general revenues of the state for research in Texas to find the causes of and cures for cancer.

The measure passed 61.43 percent in favor to 38.57 percent against.

- Comments by supporters: The state has a significant interest in finding a cure for cancer. Cancer is the number two killer of Texans, killing more than 35,000 Texans each year. Each year more than 77,000 Texans develop cancer. Cancer has a substantial economic impact on the state, costing Texans more than $4 billion each year. At a time when cancer research funding is being cut on the federal level, research institutions are in need of other sources of funding. The amendment only authorizes the issuance of general obligation bonds. The state is not required to ever actually issue the bonds. The state still may finance the cancer research program in other ways. By authorizing the issuance of $3 billion in general obligation bonds for cancer research, the state is telling the world that Texas is making a long-term commitment to attract the top researchers to the state and make the state a world leader in cancer research. Much of the cost of the debt service would be offset by royalties, income, and other intellectual property benefits realized by the state as a result of projects developed with grants of the bond proceeds. Cyclist Lance Armstrong, a native Texan and cancer survivor, campaigned in favor of Proposition 15 in the highest-funded campaign of the election.
- Comments by opponents: The state should not borrow money to finance a cancer research program while the state has a fiscal surplus and could pay for the program out of general revenue. The interest on $3 billion in general obligation bonds is approximately $1.6 billion. By borrowing $3 billion to pay for the cancer research program, the state would end up paying $4.6 billion for the cancer research program. The extra $1.6 billion would be used to pay the interest on the general obligation bonds instead of being used for cancer research. The extra $1.6 billion could be better spent by providing other benefits to the residents of the state, such as expanding the CHIP program, paying for schools, or building roads. Finding a cure for cancer is an international issue. Coordinated national and international efforts are needed, and Texas should not provide a disproportionate share of the research funds needed for finding a cure for cancer that will benefit all mankind.

== Proposition 16 ==
Proposition 16 (S.J.R. No. 20) is the constitutional amendment providing for the issuance of additional general obligation bonds by the Texas Water Development Board in an amount not to exceed $250 million to provide assistance to economically distressed areas.

The measure passed 60.77 percent in favor to 39.23 percent against.

- Comments by supporters: The authorization of additional funding will help the state meet the water and wastewater infrastructure needs of Texas’ residents. Despite the success of the economically distressed areas program, many Texas residents continue to lack water and wastewater infrastructure. Unless additional funding is provided, many residents of unincorporated and economically distressed areas will be forced to continue to live in communities lacking basic infrastructure. Providing residents access to clean water and adequate sanitation is necessary to promote public health. Many of the communities that lack adequate water and wastewater infrastructure are poor. Building water lines would enable businesses to move into those communities, improving the tax base and creating jobs for residents. The economically distressed areas program benefits the environment by reducing the amount of polluted wastewater discharged into state streams and bays.
- Comments by opponents: The economically distressed areas program should not be expanded by the authorization of additional funding. Since 1989, when the program was created, the Texas Water Development Board has received more than $500 million in state and federal funds to provide assistance under the program. The problem the program was intended to address, however, has not been resolved. Continuing to extend water lines to unincorporated areas could even prove to be counterproductive because this action encourages people to move into regions that are costly to serve. The state cannot afford to authorize more bonds that will impose a further burden on the state's general revenue fund and increase state debt.
