= 2023 Texas constitutional amendment election =

- November 7, 2023

The 2023 Texas constitutional amendment election took place on November 7, 2023. Texas voters statewide voted on 14 proposed amendments to the Texas Constitution, passing all except for Proposition 13, which would have increased the mandatory retirement age for state justices and judges.

== Proposition 1 ==
Proposition 1
- Right to Farming, Ranching, Timber Production, Horticulture, and Wildlife Management Amendment

Results
Choice	Votes	%
Yes	2,022,396	79.03%
No	536,734	20.97%
Valid votes	2,559,130	100.00%
Invalid or blank votes	0	0.00%
Total votes	2,559,130	100.00%
Registered voters/turnout	17,731,359	14.43%
County results
Yes
60–70%
70–80%
80–90%
90–100%
No
50–60%

Proposition 1 protected the "right to engage in farming, ranching, timber production, horticulture, and wildlife management".

Yes The measure passed.

== Proposition 2 ==
Proposition 2
- Property Tax Exemption for Child-Care Facilities Amendment

Results
Choice	Votes	%
Yes	1,626,303	64.78%
No	884,196	35.22%
Valid votes	2,510,499	100.00%
Invalid or blank votes	0	0.00%
Total votes	2,510,499	100.00%
Registered voters/turnout	17,731,359	14.16%
County results
Yes
50-60%
60–70%
70–80%
80–90%
No
50–60%

Proposition 2 provided an exemption from county and municipal property taxes for "all or part of the appraised value of real property used to operate a child-care facility".

Yes The measure passed.

== Proposition 3 ==
Proposition 3 prohibited any future imposition of a wealth tax.

Yes The measure passed by 68-32%.

== Proposition 4 ==
Proposition 4 made numerous changes to property tax calculation, notably an increase in the homestead exemption from school property taxes from $40,000 to $100,000, and would also add voter-elected members to larger county appraisal districts.

Yes The measure passed.

== Proposition 5 ==
Proposition 5 created the Texas University Fund, which would provide a dedicated funding mechanism for universities that aren't part of either the University of Texas System or the Texas A&M University System but which have achieved "national prominence as research universities".

Yes The measure passed.

== Proposition 6 ==
Proposition 6 created a new dedicated water fund to assist in various water projects.

Yes The measure passed.

== Proposition 7 ==
Proposition 7 created a new dedicated energy fund "to support the construction, maintenance, modernization, and operation of electric generating facilities".

Yes The measure passed.

== Proposition 8 ==
Proposition 8 created a new dedicated broadband fund "to expand high-speed broadband access and assist in the financing of connectivity projects".

Yes The measure passed.

== Proposition 9 ==
Proposition 9 authorized a cost-of-living adjustment to certain annuitants of the Teacher Retirement System of Texas.

Yes The measure passed.

== Proposition 10 ==
Proposition 10 provided an exemption from property taxes for "equipment or inventory held by a manufacturer of medical or biomedical products to protect the Texas healthcare network and strengthen our medical supply chain".

Yes The measure passed.

== Proposition 11 ==
Proposition 11 permitted conservation and reclamation districts in El Paso County to issue bonds supported by ad valorem taxes to fund the development and maintenance of parks and recreational facilities.

Yes The measure passed.

== Proposition 12 ==
Proposition 12 abolished the office of County Treasurer in Galveston County (the text of the amendment required not only the approval of a majority of voters statewide, but also a majority of voters within Galveston County).

Yes The measure passed, having received the requisite approval both statewide and within Galveston County.

== Proposition 13 ==
Proposition 13
- Increase Mandatory Retirement Age for State Judges Amendment

Results
Choice	Votes	%
Yes	931,115	37.31%
No	1,564,688	62.69%
Valid votes	2,495,803	100.00%
Invalid or blank votes	0	0.00%
Total votes	2,495,803	100.00%
Registered voters/turnout	17,731,359	14.08%
County results
Yes
50–60%
60–70%
No
50–60%
60–70%
70–80%

Proposition 13 would have increased the mandatory retirement age for state justices and judges.

No The measure did not pass.

== Proposition 14 ==
Proposition 14 created a new dedicated parks fund (the "centennial parks conservation fund") for the creation and improvement of state parks.

Yes The measure passed.

== See also ==
- 2023 Texas elections
