= 2016 United States Senate election in Louisiana =

- November 8, 2016 (first round); December 10, 2016 (runoff)
- Turnout: 67.8% ▲ (first round) 29.0% ▼ (runoff)
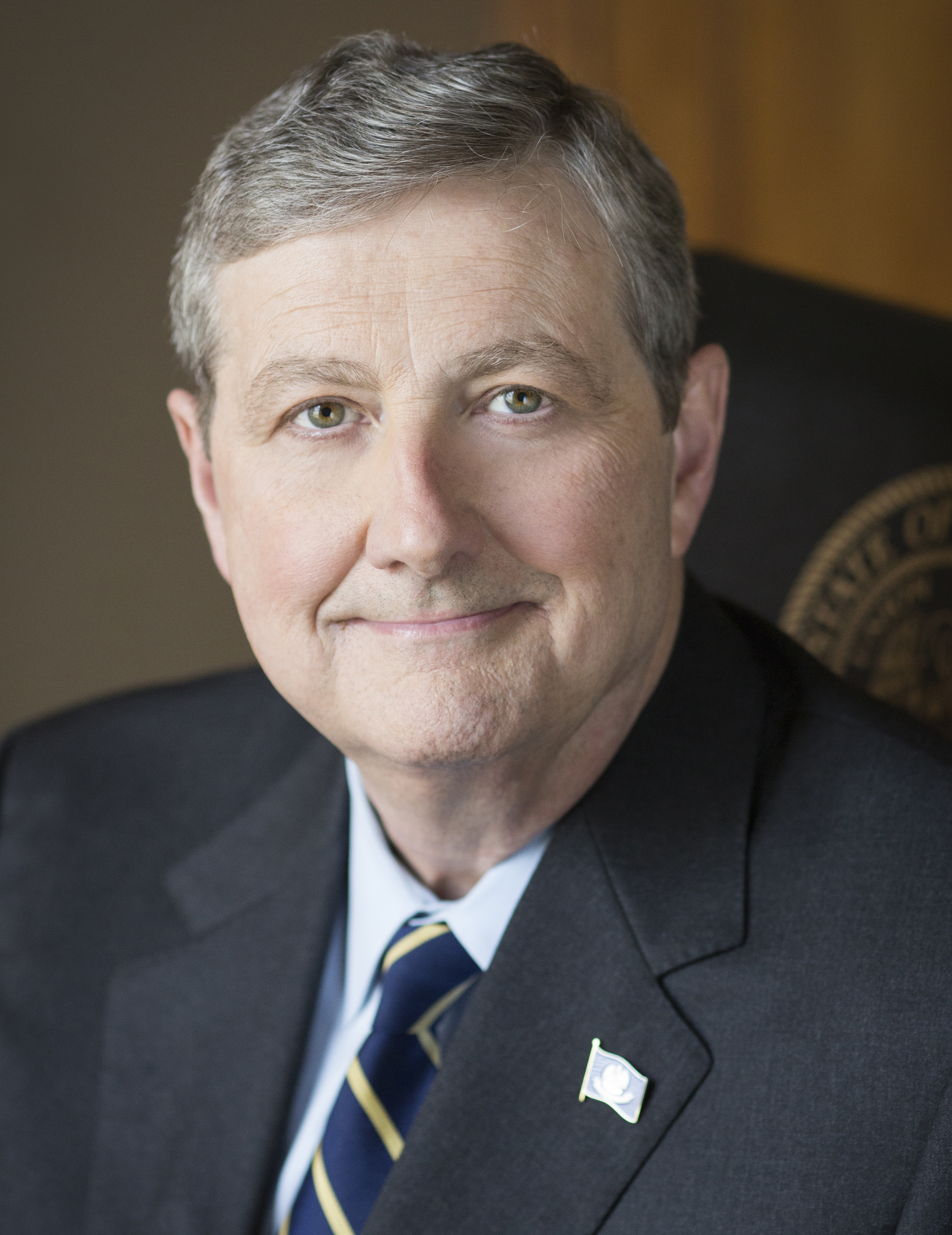

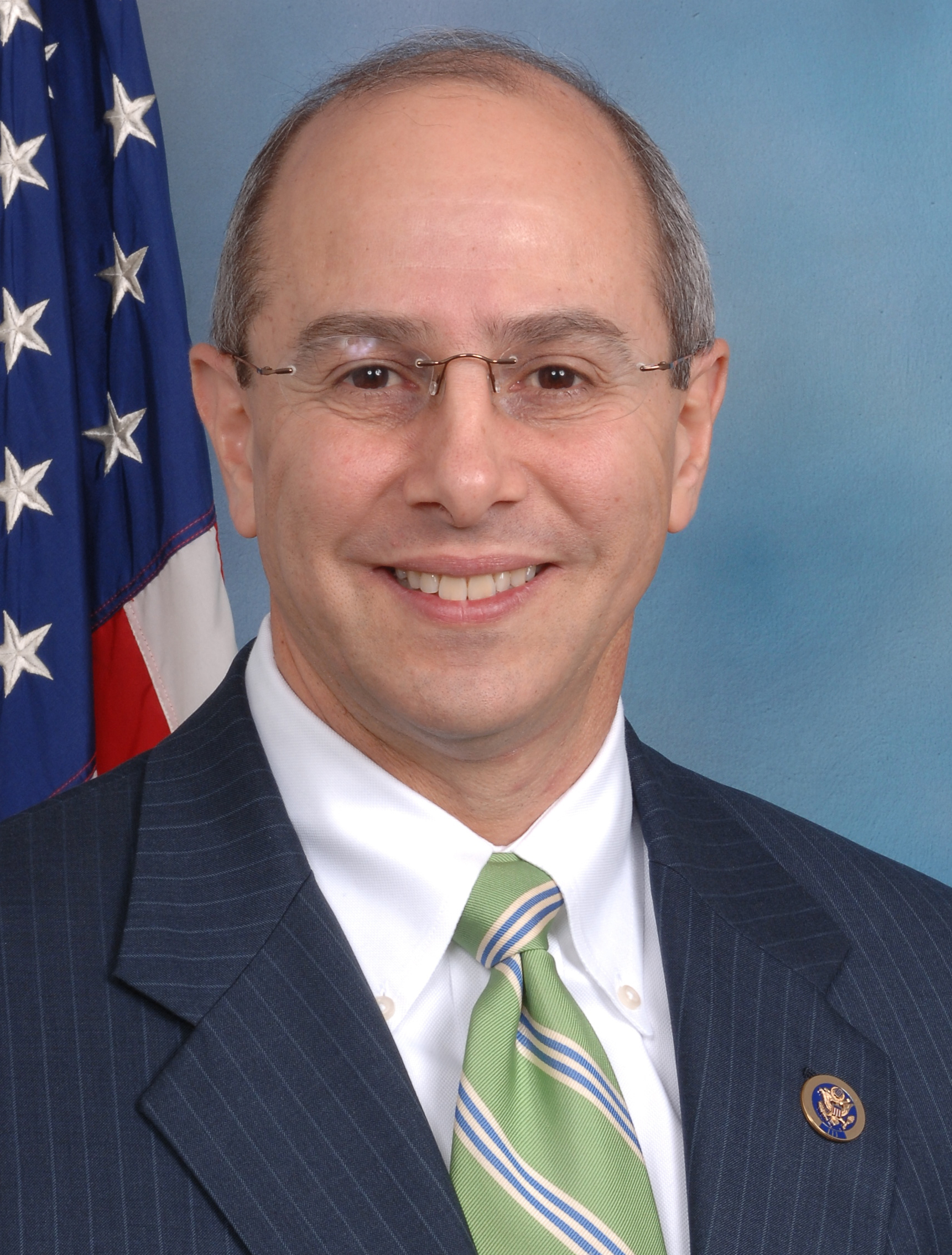

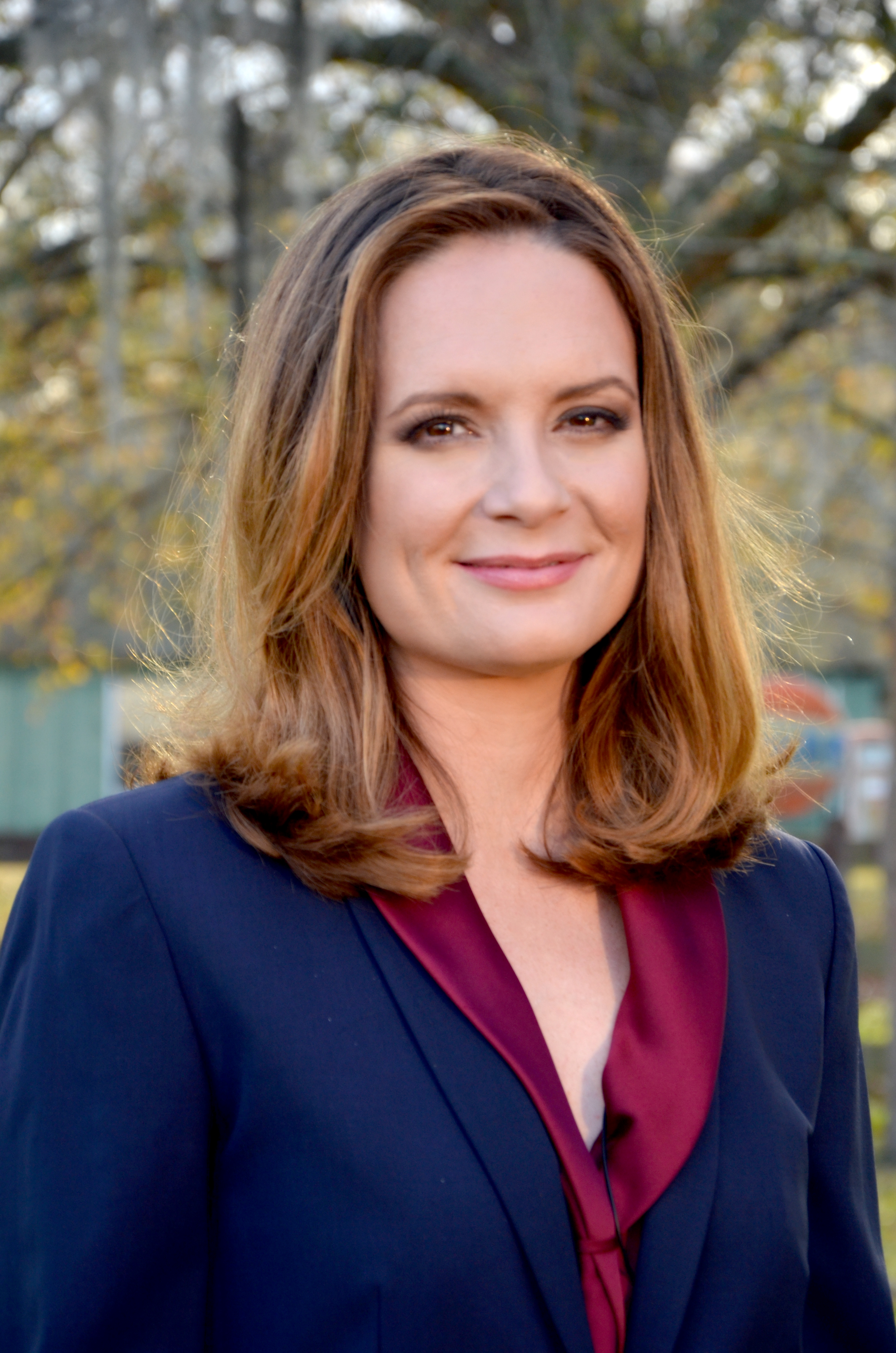

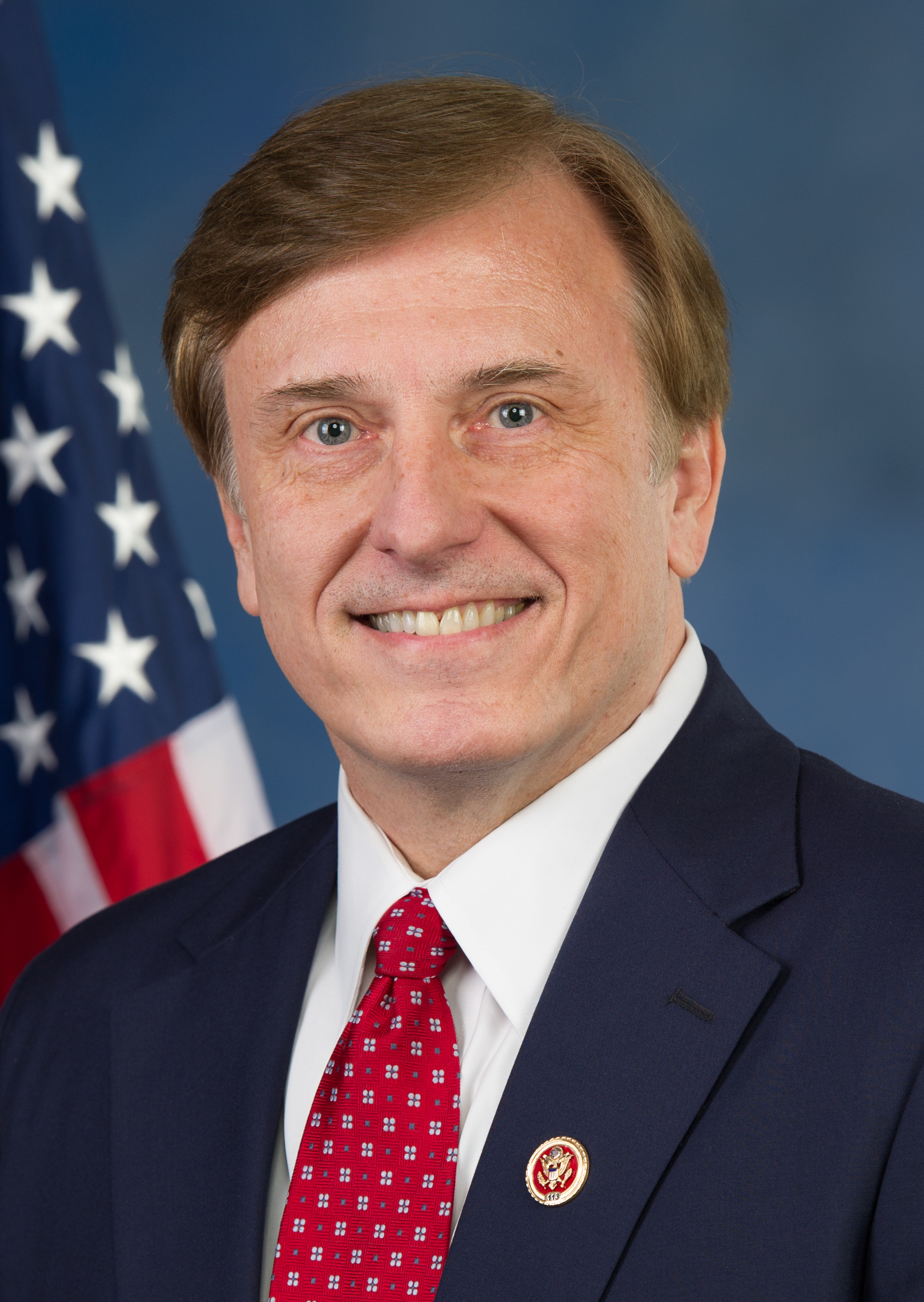
Candidate	John Kennedy	Foster Campbell	Charles Boustany
Party	Republican	Democratic	Republican
First round	482,591; 24.96%	337,833; 17.47%	298,008; 15.41%
Runoff	536,191; 60.65%	347,816; 39.35%	Eliminated
Candidate	Caroline Fayard	John Fleming
Party	Democratic	Republican
First round	240,917; 12.46%	204,026; 10.55%
Runoff	Eliminated	Eliminated
- Kennedy: 10–20% 20–30% 30–40% 40–50% 50–60% 60–70% 70–80% Campbell: 10–20% 20–30% 30–40% 40–50% 50–60% 60–70% 70–80% 80–90% >90% Boustany: 10–20% 20–30% 30–40% 40–50% 50–60% 60–70% 70–80% >90% Fayard: 10–20% 20–30% 30–40% 40–50% 50–60% 60–70% Fleming: 20–30% 30–40% 40–50% 50–60% 60–70% 80–90% >90% Maness: 20–30% 30–40% Duke: 20–30% 50–60% Edwards: 20–30% 30–40% Landrieu: 50–60% Crawford: >90% Cao: 30–40% 40–50% Billiot: 20–30% 30–40% Williams: 10–20% 30–40% 40–50% Mendoza: 20–30% Tie: <20% 30–40% 40–50% No votes Kennedy: 10–20% 20–30% 30–40% 40–50% 50–60% 60–70% 70–80% Campbell: 10–20% 20–30% 30–40% 40–50% 50–60% 60–70% 70–80% 80–90% >90% Boustany: 10–20% 20–30% 30–40% 40–50% 50–60% 60–70% 70–80% >90% Fayard: 10–20% 20–30% 30–40% 40–50% 50–60% 60–70% Fleming: 20–30% 30–40% 40–50% 50–60% 60–70% 80–90% >90% Maness: 20–30% 30–40% Duke: 20–30% 50–60% Edwards: 20–30% 30–40% Landrieu: 50–60% Crawford: >90% Cao: 30–40% 40–50% Billiot: 20–30% 30–40% Williams: 10–20% 30–40% 40–50% Mendoza: 20–30% Tie: <20% 30–40% 40–50% No votes Kennedy: 50–60% 60–70% 70–80% 80–90% >90% Campbell: 50–60% 60–70% 70–80% 80–90% >90% Tie: 50% No votes Kennedy: 50–60% 60–70% 70–80% 80–90% >90% Campbell: 50–60% 60–70% 70–80% 80–90% >90% Tie: 50% No votes Kennedy: 50–60% 60–70% 70–80% 80–90% >90% Campbell: 50–60% 60–70% 70–80% 80–90% >90% Tie: 50% No votes
U.S. senator before election
David Vitter
Republican
Elected U.S. Senator
John Kennedy
Republican

The 2016 United States Senate election in Louisiana took place on November 8, 2016, to elect a member of the United States Senate to represent the state of Louisiana, concurrently with the 2016 U.S. presidential election, as well as other elections to the United States Senate in other states and elections to the United States House of Representatives, and various state and local elections.

Under Louisiana's "jungle primary" system, all candidates appeared on the same ballot, regardless of party, and voters could vote for any candidate. Since no candidate received a majority of the vote during the primary election, a runoff election was held on December 10 between the top two candidates in the primary, Republican John Neely Kennedy and Democrat Foster Campbell, where Kennedy won with 60.65% of the vote, giving Senate Republicans 52 seats in the 115th Congress. Louisiana is the only state that has a jungle primary system (California and Washington have a similar "top two primary" system). Kennedy had previously unsuccessfully ran for this seat in 2004 as a Democrat and the state's other U.S. Senate seat in 2008 as a Republican.

Incumbent Republican Senator David Vitter unsuccessfully ran for governor of Louisiana in 2015, and in his concession speech he announced that he would not seek re-election to the Senate in 2016.

In addition to Kennedy and Campbell, four other candidates — Republicans Charles Boustany, John Fleming, and David Duke, and Democrat Caroline Fayard — qualified to participate at a debate at Dillard University, a historically black college, on November 2, 2016 This election is the most recent United States Senate runoff election in Louisiana as of 2024.

== Candidates ==
=== Republican Party ===
==== Declared ====
- Charles Boustany, U.S. representative
- Joseph Cao, former U.S. representative and candidate for Louisiana attorney general in 2011
- Donald "Crawdaddy" Crawford, business appraiser
- David Duke, former state representative, former Grand Wizard of the Ku Klux Klan and perennial candidate
- John Fleming, U.S. representative
- John Neely Kennedy, state treasurer, Democratic candidate for this seat in 2004 and nominee for the U.S. Senate Class 2 in 2008
- Rob Maness, retired United States Air Force colonel, and candidate for the U.S. Senate in 2014
- Charles Eugene Marsala, financial advisor and former mayor of Atherton, California

==== Withdrew ====
- Abhay Patel, businessman

==== Declined ====
- Scott Angelle, Public Service commissioner, former lieutenant governor of Louisiana, and candidate for governor in 2015 (running for LA-03)
- Jay Dardenne, Louisiana commissioner of Administration, former lieutenant governor of Louisiana and candidate for governor in 2015
- Zach Dasher, pharmaceutical representative, cousin of the Robertson family and candidate for LA-05 in 2014
- Brett Geymann, former state representative (running for LA-03)
- Clay Higgins, former St. Landry Parish sheriff's captain (running for LA-03)
- Paul Hollis, state representative and candidate for the U.S. Senate in 2014
- Bobby Jindal, former governor of Louisiana
- Vance McAllister, former U.S. representative and candidate for the state senate in 2015
- Tony Perkins, president of the Family Research Council, former state representative and candidate for the U.S. Senate in 2002
- Melinda Schwegmann, former lieutenant governor of Louisiana, former state representative, and candidate for governor in 1995
- Eric Skrmetta, Public Service Commissioner
- David Vitter, incumbent U.S. senator and nominee for governor in 2015
- John Young, former president of Jefferson Parish and candidate for lieutenant governor in 2015

=== Democratic Party ===
==== Declared ====
- Foster Campbell, Public Service commissioner, former state senator, candidate for governor in 2007 and for LA-04 in 1980, 1988 and 1990
- Derrick Edwards, attorney and disability rights activist
- Caroline Fayard, attorney and candidate for lieutenant governor in 2010
- Gary Landrieu, building contractor, candidate for the New Orleans City Council in 2012, candidate for LA-02 in 2012 and 2014 and cousin of former U.S. Senator Mary Landrieu and New Orleans Mayor Mitch Landrieu
- Vinny Mendoza, USAF Ret. Veteran, organic farmer and 1st CD candidate in 2004, 2008, 2010, 2012 and 2014,
- Josh Pellerin, businessman
- Peter Williams, tree farmer, candidate for LA-06 in 2014 and Independent candidate for LA-05 in 2013

==== Declined ====
- Jim Bernhard, president of Bernhard Capital Partners, founder and former CEO of The Shaw Group and former chairman of the Louisiana Democratic Party
- Don Cazayoux, former U.S. representative and former United States attorney for the Middle District of Louisiana
- John Georges, businessman, candidate for governor in 2007 and candidate for mayor of New Orleans in 2010
- Kip Holden, mayor-president of East Baton Rouge Parish and candidate for lieutenant governor in 2015 (running for LA-02)
- Robert Johnson, state representative and candidate for LA-05 in 2013
- Eric LaFleur, state senator
- Mary Landrieu, former U.S. senator
- Mitch Landrieu, mayor of New Orleans and former lieutenant governor of Louisiana
- Charlie Melancon, former U.S. representative and nominee in 2010
- Jacques Roy, mayor of Alexandria
- Gary Smith, Jr., state senator

=== Libertarian Party ===
==== Declared ====
- Thomas Clements, Republican candidate for the U.S. Senate in 2014 (also ran for president of the United States)
- Le Roy Gillam, minister

=== Independents ===
==== Declared ====
- Beryl Billiot, restaurateur and candidate for governor in 2015
- Troy Hebert, former commissioner of the Louisiana Office of Alcohol and Tobacco Control and former state senator
- Bob Lang, candidate for the U.S. Senate in 2010 and candidate for governor in 2011
- Kaitlin Marone, stand-up comedian
- Gregory Taylor, unemployed janitor
- Arden Wells, perennial candidate

== Jungle primary ==
=== Debates ===
Dates	Location	Kennedy	Campbell	Boustany	Fayard	Fleming	Duke	Link
October 18, 2016	Ruston, Louisiana	Participant	Participant	Participant	Participant	Participant	Not invited	
November 2, 2016	New Orleans, Louisiana	Participant	Participant	Participant	Participant	Participant	Participant	

=== Endorsements ===
Charles Boustany

Individuals

- Mark Abraham, state representative
- Bret Allain, state senator
- Stuart Bishop, state representative
- Chris Broadwater, state representative
- Steve Carter, state representative
- Page Cortez, state senator
- Jean-Paul Coussan, state representative
- Mike Danahay, state representative (Democrat)
- Paula Davis, state representative
- Stephen Dwight, state representative
- Cameron Henry, state representative
- Ronnie Johns, state senator
- Nancy Landry, state representative
- Tanner Magee, state representative
- Dan Morrish, state senator
- Newell Normand, Jefferson Parish sheriff
- Abhay Patel, businessman and former candidate for the United States Senate
- Barrow Peacock, state senator
- Julie Stokes, state representative
- Michael Strain, Louisiana Commissioner of Agriculture and Forestry
- Jerome Zeringue, state representative

Newspapers

- Baton Rouge Business Report
- The Daily Advertiser
- Gambit
- Louisiana State Newspapers (a newspaper company)
- The Times-Picayune
Foster Campbell

Individuals

- Sidney Barthelemy, former mayor of New Orleans
- Wesley T. Bishop, state senator
- Lambert Boissiere III, Public Service commissioner
- Lambert Boissiere Jr., 1st City Court constable, former New Orleans city councilman and former state senator
- Larry Carter, United Teachers of New Orleans
- John Bel Edwards, governor of Louisiana
- Nick Felton, New Orleans Firefighter Association IAFF Local 632
- James Gray, New Orleans city councilman
- Tiger Hammonds, Greater New Orleans AFL-CIO
- Cynthia Hedge-Morrell, former New Orleans councilwoman
- Juan LaFonta, former state representative
- Arthur Morrell, Orleans Parish Criminal Court clerk and former state representative
- Irma Muse Dixon, former Public Service commissioner and former state representative

Organizations

- Algiers Political Action Committee
- Black Organization for Leadership Development (BOLD)
- Carpenters & Piledrivers Local #1846
- Construction Craft Laborers Local #99
- District Council 80, Local Union #1244 Glaziers
- District Council 80, Local Union #1244 Painters, Wall-Coverers & Drywall Finishers
- Electrical Workers Local Union #130
- International Association of Heat and Frost Insulators and Allied Workers Local 53
- International Brotherhood of Boilermakers, Iron Ship Builders, Blacksmiths, Forgers and Helpers Local 37
- International Union of Bricklayers and Allied Craftworkers Local 6
- Iron Worker Local Union #58
- Louisiana AFL–CIO
- Louisiana Federation of Teachers
- Millwrights Local Union #729
- NOEL
- Operating Engineers Local #406
- Plasterers' & Cement Masons' Local Union #567
- Plumbers & Steamfitters Local #60
- Road Sprinkler Fitters Local #669
- Roofers & Waterproofers #317
- Sheet Metal Worker Local #214 New Orleans Area
- Teamsters Local Union 270
- TIPS
David Duke

Individuals

- Mark Dankof, Lutheran pastor from Texas and Constitution Party candidate for the U.S. Senate in Delaware in 2000
- James Edwards, talk radio host
- Brad Griffin, white nationalist
- Jeff Rense, talk radio host

Organizations

- Australia First Party
- National Socialist Movement, Neo-Nazi organization
Caroline Fayard

Individuals

- James Carville, political consultant
- Mary Landrieu, former United States senator from Louisiana
- Mitch Landrieu, mayor of New Orleans and former lieutenant governor of Louisiana

Organizations

- Alliance For Good Government
- Democrats for Education Reform Louisiana
- Independent Democratic Electors Association
- Independent Women's Organization New Orleans
- New Orleans Coalition
John Fleming

Individuals

- Gary Bauer, founder and chairman of Campaign for Working Families, former president of the Family Research Council and candidate for President in 2000
- William G. Boykin, retired Army lieutenant general and executive vice president of the Family Research Council
- Ted Cruz, U.S. senator from Texas and candidate for president in 2016
- Jim Jordan, U.S. representative (OH-04) and chairman of the House Freedom Caucus
- Mike Lee, U.S. senator from Utah
- Penny Nance, CEO and president of Concerned Women for America
- Tony Perkins, president of the Family Research Council, former state representative and candidate for the U.S. Senate in 2002
- Willie Robertson, TV personality
- Rick Santorum, former U.S. senator from Pennsylvania and candidate for president in 2012 and 2016

Organizations

- Bossier Parish Republican Party
- Campaign for Working Families
- Citizens United
- Club for Growth
- Concerned Women for America
- Family Research Council
- FreedomWorks
- National Organization for Marriage
- Rapides Parish Republican Party
- Tea Party Patriots Citizens Fund
John Neely Kennedy

Individuals

- Pat Brister, St. Tammany Parish president
- Timothy Burns, former state representative
- Lane Carson, former secretary of the Louisiana Department of Veterans Affairs
- Billy Chandler, former state representative
- Patrick Connick, state representative
- Jack Donahue, state senator
- Reid Falconer, state representative
- Robert Faucheux, former state representative (Democratic)
- Jimmy Fitzmorris, former lieutenant governor of Louisiana (Democratic)
- Franklin Foil, state representative
- Murphy J. Foster, Jr., former governor of Louisiana and state senator
- James Garvey, BESE member
- Paul Hollis, state representative
- Gary Jones, BESE member
- Rick Nowlin, Natchitoches Parish president
- Kevin Pearson, state representative
- Henry "Tank" Powell, former state representative
- Dee Richard, state representative
- Buddy Roemer, former governor of Louisiana and U.S. representative (LA-04)
- Chas Roemer, former BESE member
- John Schroder, state representative
- Kirk Talbot, state representative
- Ned Thomas, Washington Parish president
- Jim Tucker, former Louisiana House Speaker

Organizations

- Grant Parish Republican Party
Rob Maness

Individuals

- Matt Bevin, governor of Kentucky and candidate for the U.S. Senate in 2014
- Ben Carson, retired Johns Hopkins neurosurgeon and former 2016 presidential candidate
- James Dobson, founder of Focus on the Family and the Family Research Council
- Stephen L. Gunn, former state representative from Grant Parish, an Independent
- Chris McDaniel, Mississippi state senator and candidate for U.S. Senate from Mississippi in 2014
- Billy Nungesser, lieutenant governor of Louisiana
- Rand Paul, U.S. senator from Kentucky and former 2016 presidential candidate
- Paul Vallely, retired US Army major general and senior military analyst for Fox News

Organizations

- Republican Liberty Caucus
- Tea Party of Louisiana

=== Polling ===
View source data.

Poll source	Date(s) administered	Sample size	Margin of error	Charles Boustany (R)	Foster Campbell (D)	David Duke (R)	Caroline Fayard (D)	John Fleming (R)	John Kennedy (R)	Rob Maness (R)	Other	Undecided
SurveyMonkey	November 1–7, 2016	982	± 4.6%	14%	13%	3%	21%	12%	21%	6%	4% (Note: Joshua Pellerin (D) with 4%)	6%
SurveyMonkey	October 31 – November 6, 2016	840	± 4.6%	15%	14%	3%	20%	11%	21%	6%	5% (Note: Joshua Pellerin (D) with 5%)	5%
SurveyMonkey	October 28 – November 3, 2016	646	± 4.6%	15%	14%	3%	19%	11%	21%	5%	4% (Note: Joshua Pellerin (D) with 4%)	8%
SurveyMonkey	October 27 – November 2, 2016	546	± 4.6%	13%	13%	3%	21%	12%	21%	5%	4% (Note: Joshua Pellerin (D) with 4%)	8%
SurveyMonkey	October 26 – November 1, 2016	470	± 4.6%	13%	13%	2%	21%	12%	23%	4%	3% (Note: Joshua Pellerin (D) with 3%)	9%
Southern Media and Opinion Research	October 19–21, 2016	500	± 4.4%	14%	16%	—	12%	9%	22%	—	—	27%
The Times-Picayune/Lucid	October 15–21, 2016	614	± 3.0%	12%	17%	4%	12%	10%	18%	4%	7% (Note: "Others" with 5% and Joseph Cao (R) with 2%)	17%
University of New Orleans	October 15–21, 2016	603	± 4.0%	15%	15%	2%	10%	11%	22%	4%	9% (Note: "Others" with 7%, Joseph Cao (R) with 1% and Abhay Patel (R) with 1%)	12%
FOX 8/Mason-Dixon	October 20, 2016	625	± 4.0%	11%	19%	5%	12%	10%	24%	3%	3% (Note: "Others" with 2%, Derrick Edwards (D) with 1%, Gary Landrieu (D), Vinny Mendoza (D), Joshua Pellerin (D), and Peter Williams (D) all with 0%)	13%
Market Research Insight	October 17–19, 2016	600	± 4.0%	16%	14%	—	12%	7%	17%	—	—	34%
JMC Analytics (R)	October 11–15, 2016	800	± 3.5%	16%	25%	3%	10%	16%	16%	3%	2%	10%
JMC Analytics (R)	September 22–24, 2016	905	± 3.3%	15%	15%	3%	12%	14%	11%	4%	1%	25%
Market Research Insight	September 17–19, 2016	600	± 4.0%	12%	10%	—	11%	10%	18%	—	—	39%
Southern Media and Opinion Research	September 15–17, 2016	500	± 4.4%	15%	9%	3%	11%	8%	17%	3%	7% (Note: "Others", Joseph Cao (R), and Peter Williams (D) each with 2% and Troy Hebert (I) with 1%)	26%
Anzalone Liszt Grove Research (D)	August 29 – September 1, 2016	605	± 4.0%	13%	7%	3%	13%	6%	18%	4%	5% (Note: Troy Hebert (I) with 3%, Peter Williams (D) and "Others" each with 1%)	31%
The Hayride/Remington Research	August 29–30, 2016	1,017	± 3.2%	13%	16%	6%	12%	6%	27%	4%	—	15%
GBA Strategies	June 6–9, 2016	500	± 4.4%	11%	15%	—	14%	9%	30%	6%	12% (Note: Troy Hebert (I) with 7%, Joseph Cao (R) with 3%, and Peter Williams (D) 2%)	2%
Anzalone Liszt Grove Research	May 31 – June 2, 2016	600	± 4.0%	11%	14%	—	9%	7%	24%	3%	–	33%
Southern Media and Opinion Research	May 19–23, 2016	500	± 4.4%	10%	9%	—	4%	5%	32%	4%	3% (Note: Troy Hebert (I) with 2% and Eric Skrmetta (R) with 1%)	32%
SurveyUSA	March 4–8, 2016	600	± 4.1%	10%	12%	—	10%	7%	21%	6%	12% (Note: Troy Hebert (I) with 5%, Joseph Cao (R) with 4%, and Peter Williams (D) with 3%)	15%
Southern Media and Opinion Research	February 2–4, 2016	500	± 4.4%	10%	7%	—	4%	6%	22%	7%	—	30%
SurveyUSA	December 4–7, 2015	600	± 4.1%	10%	23%	—	–	6%	21%	9%	—	19%

Hypothetical polling

Poll source	Date(s) administered	Sample size	Margin of error	Scott Angelle (R)	Charles Boustany (R)	John Fleming (R)	John Kennedy (R)	Mitch Landrieu (D)	Undecided
MRI	December 2–4, 2015	600	± 4.1%	24%	15%	5%	15%	30%	11%
NSO Research (R-Kennedy)	January 10–13, 2014	600	± 4%	–	13%	7%	18%	39%	23%

=== Results ===
United States Senate election in Louisiana, 2016
Party	Candidate	Votes	%
Republican	John Kennedy	482,591	24.96
Democratic	Foster Campbell	337,833	17.47
Republican	Charles Boustany	298,008	15.41
Democratic	Caroline Fayard	240,917	12.46
Republican	John Fleming	204,026	10.55
Republican	Rob Maness	90,856	4.7
Republican	David Duke	58,606	3.03
Democratic	Derrick Edwards	51,774	2.68
Democratic	Gary Landrieu	45,587	2.36
Republican	Donald "Crawdaddy" Crawford	25,523	1.32
Republican	Joseph Cao	21,019	1.09
Independent	Beryl Billiot	19,352	1
Libertarian	Thomas Clements	11,370	0.59
Independent	Troy Hebert	9,503	0.49
Democratic	Josh Pellerin	7,395	0.38
Democratic	Peter Williams	6,855	0.35
Democratic	Vinny Mendoza	4,927	0.25
Independent	Kaitlin Marone	4,108	0.21
Libertarian	Le Roy Gillam	4,067	0.21
Republican	Charles Eugene Marsala	3,684	0.19
Republican	Abhay Patel	1,576	0.08
Independent	Arden Wells	1,483	0.08
Independent	Bob Lang	1,424	0.07
Independent	Gregory Taylor	1,151	0.06
Total votes		1,933,635	100

==== Maps ====
Support for Boustany by parish:
>50%
40–50%
30–40%
20–30%
10–20%
<10%

Support for Campbell by parish:
35–40%
30–35%
25–30%
20–25%
15–20%
10–15%
5–10%
<5%

Support for Duke by parish:
>8%
7–8%
6–7%
5–6%
4–5%
3–4%
2–3%
1–2%
<1%

Support for Edwards by parish:
>7%
6–7%
4–5%
3–4%
2–3%
1–2%
<1%

Support for Fayard by parish:
>30%
25–30%
20–25%
15–20%
10–15%
5–10%
<5%

Support for Fleming by parish:
>40%
35–40%
30–35%
25–30%
20–25%
15–20%
10–15%
5–10%
<5%

Support for Kennedy by parish:
>40%
35–40%
30–35%
25–30%
20–25%
15–20%
10–15%
5–10%

Support for Maness by parish:
>9%
8–9%
7–8%
6–7%
5–6%
4–5%
3–4%
2–3%
1–2%
<1%

== Runoff ==
=== Polling ===
View source data.

Poll source	Date(s) administered	Sample size	Margin of error	John Kennedy (R)	Foster Campbell (D)	Undecided
University of New Orleans	December 6, 2016	776	± 4.9%	62%	33%	5%
Trafalgar Group (R)	December 5–6, 2016	2,500	± 2.0%	56%	40%	4%
Emerson College	November 29–30, 2016	400	± 4.9%	51%	33%	16%
Southern Media and Opinion Research	November 28–30, 2016	500	± 4.4%	52%	38%	10%
Tulane University	November 8–18, 2016	820	± 3.0%	60%	40%	0%
Trafalgar Group (R)	November 14–17, 2016	2,200	± 2.1%	58%	35%	6%
The Hayride/Remington Research	August 29–30, 2016	1,017	± 3.2%	51%	27%	22%
SurveyUSA	March 4–8, 2016	600	± 4.1%	54%	34%	12%

Hypothetical polling

Poll source	Date(s) administered	Sample size	Margin of error	John Neely Kennedy (R)	Caroline Fayard (D)	Undecided
Anzalone Liszt Grove Research	August 29–September 1, 2016	605	± 4.0%	49%	38%	13%
SurveyUSA	March 4–8, 2016	600	± 4.1%	54%	34%	12%

Poll source	Date(s) administered	Sample size	Margin of error	David Duke (R)	Caroline Fayard (D)	Undecided
Anzalone Liszt Grove Research	August 29–September 1, 2016	605	± 4.0%	15%	64%	21%

Poll source	Date(s) administered	Sample size	Margin of error	Charles Boustany (R)	John Neely Kennedy (R)	Undecided
SurveyUSA	March 4–8, 2016	600	± 4.1%	22%	50%	27%

Poll source	Date(s) administered	Sample size	Margin of error	Charles Boustany (R)	Caroline Fayard (D)	Undecided
Anzalone Liszt Grove Research	August 29–September 1, 2016	605	± 4.0%	40%	43%	17%

=== Predictions ===
Source	Ranking	As of
The Cook Political Report	Safe R	November 2, 2016
Sabato's Crystal Ball	Likely R	November 7, 2016
Rothenberg Political Report	Safe R	November 3, 2016
Daily Kos	Safe R	November 8, 2016
Real Clear Politics	Likely R	November 7, 2016

=== Results ===
United States Senate election runoff in Louisiana, 2016
Party	Candidate	Votes	%	±%
Republican	John Neely Kennedy	536,191	60.65%	+4.09%
Democratic	Foster Campbell	347,816	39.35%	+1.68%
Total votes		884,007	100%	N/A
Republican hold				

Parishes that flipped from Republican to Democratic

- East Baton Rouge (largest city: Baton Rouge)
- Tensas (largest city: Newellton)
- Madison (largest town: Tallulah)

Parishes that flipped from Democratic to Republican

- Assumption (largest city: Pierrer Part)
- Pointe Coupee (largest city: New Roads)

==== By congressional district ====
Kennedy won five of six congressional districts.

District	Kennedy	Campbell	Representative
1st	75%	25%	Steve Scalise
2nd	24%	76%	Cedric Richmond
3rd	72%	28%	Clay Higgins
4th	62%	38%	Mike Johnson
5th	65%	35%	Ralph Abraham
6th	66%	34%	Garret Graves
