= 2016 United States House of Representatives elections in Louisiana =

- November 8, 2016

All 6 Louisiana seats to the United States House of Representatives
	Majority party	Minority party
Party	Republican	Democratic
Last election	5	1
Seats won	5	1
Seat change	Steady	Steady
Popular vote	1,198,764	564,064
Percentage	66.44%	31.26%
Swing	▲3.77%	▲3.28%

Republican
50–60%
60–70%
70–80%
80–90%
90>%
Democratic
40–50%
50–60%
60–70%
70–80%
80–90%
90>%

The 2016 United States House of Representatives elections in Louisiana were held on November 8, 2016, to elect the six U.S. representatives from the state of Louisiana, one from each of the state's six congressional districts. The elections coincided with the 2016 U.S. presidential election, as well as other elections to the House of Representatives, elections to the United States Senate and various state and local elections.

This cycle saw the election of Republican Mike Johnson to the state's 4th congressional district; Johnson would later be elected Speaker of the House in 2023.

== Overview ==
Popular vote
Republican	66.44%
Democratic	31.26%
Other	2.30%

House seats
Republican	83.33%
Democratic	16.67%

=== By district ===
Results of the 2016 United States House of Representatives elections in Louisiana by district:

District	Republican		Democratic		Others		Total		Result
District	Votes	%	Votes	%	Votes	%	Votes	%	Result
District 1	243,645	74.56%	63,785	19.52%	19,358	5.92%	326,788	100.0%	Republican hold
District 2	0	0.00%	284,269	100.0%	0	0.00%	284,269	100.0%	Democratic hold
District 3	258,632	80.71%	56,215	17.54%	5,607	1.75%	320,454	100.0%	Republican hold
District 4	199,750	69.85%	80,593	28.18%	5,642	1.97%	285,985	100.0%	Republican hold
District 5	255,662	100.0%	0	0.00%	0	0.00%	255,662	100.0%	Republican hold
District 6	241,075	72.81%	79,202	23.92%	10,821	3.27%	331,098	100.0%	Republican hold
Total	1,198,764	66.44%	564,064	31.26%	41,428	2.30%	1,804,256	100.0%	

== District 1 ==
2016 Louisiana's 1st congressional district election
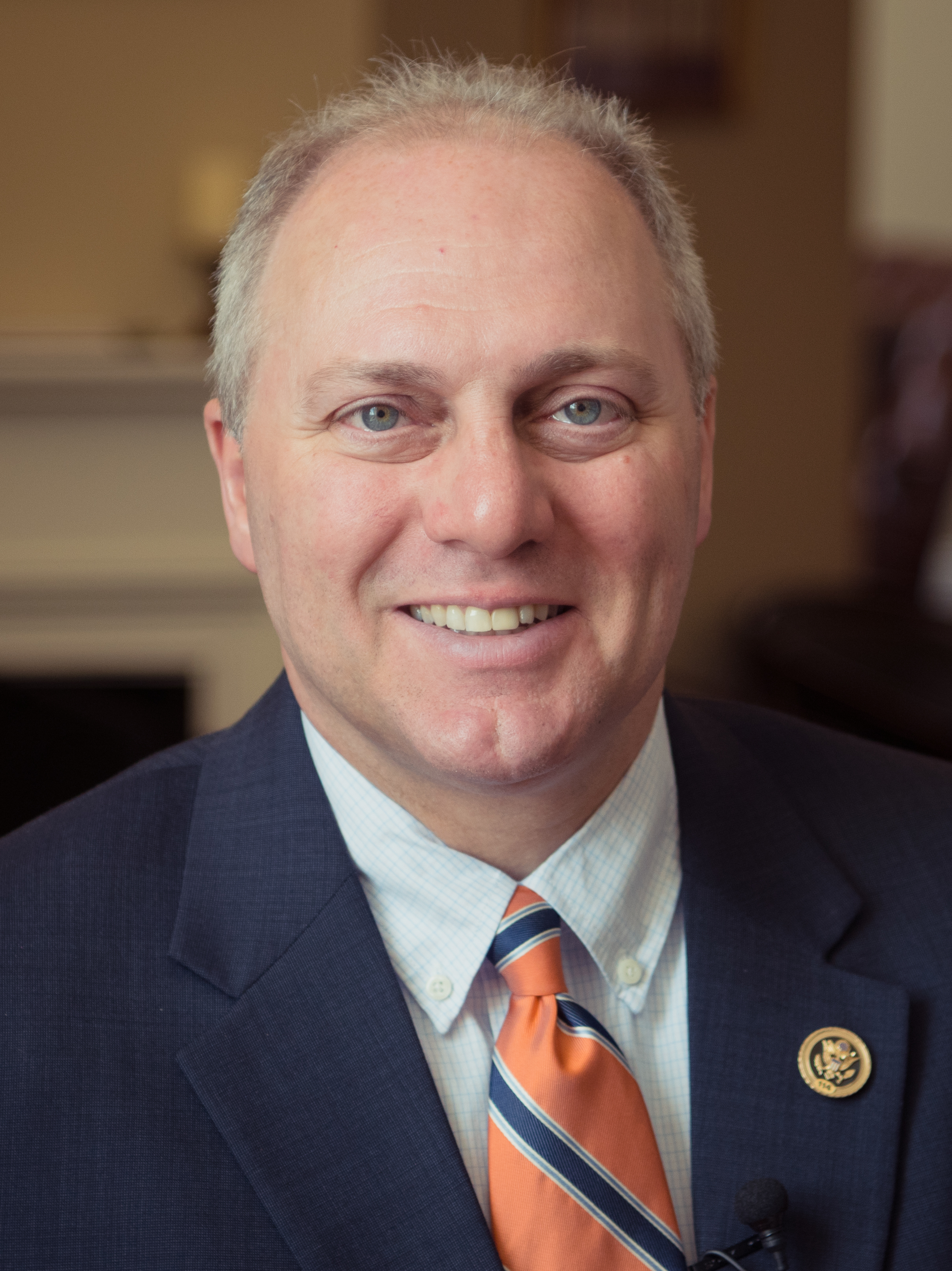

Candidate	Steve Scalise	Lee Ann Dugas
Party	Republican	Democratic
Popular vote	243,645	41,840
Percentage	74.6%	12.8%
- Parish results Scalise: 50–60% 60–70% 70–80% 80–90%
U.S. Representative before election
Steve Scalise
Republican
Elected U.S. Representative
Steve Scalise
Republican

The incumbent was Republican Steve Scalise, who had represented the district since 2008. He was re-elected with 78% of the vote in 2014.

In late 2014, Scalise became embroiled in a controversy over a speech he had given to the white supremacist group European-American Unity and Rights Organization, which was founded by David Duke, in 2002. After it emerged that earlier in his career, Scalise had compared himself to Duke, Scalise distanced himself from Duke. This prompted Duke to say that he might run against Scalise in 2016 because Scalise had been "elected on false pretenses" and had "betrayed" the voters by "suggesting that they're racist because they supported my views". In July 2016, Duke said he was considering running against Scalise.

=== Candidates ===
==== Republican ====
===== Declared =====
- Steve Scalise, incumbent U.S. Representative and House Majority Whip

===== Declined =====
- David Duke, former state representative, candidate for governor of Louisiana in 1991, and former Ku Klux Klan Grand Wizard (ran for U.S. Senate)

==== Democratic ====
===== Declared =====
- Lee Ann Dugas
- Danil Faust
- Joe Swider, psychiatrist

==== Libertarian ====
===== Declared =====
- Howard Kearney

==== Green ====
===== Declared =====
- Eliot Barron

==== Independent ====
===== Declared =====
- Chuemai Yang

=== General election ===
==== Predictions ====
Source	Ranking	As of
The Cook Political Report	Safe R	November 7, 2016
Daily Kos Elections	Safe R	November 7, 2016
Rothenberg	Safe R	November 3, 2016
Sabato's Crystal Ball	Safe R	November 7, 2016
RCP	Safe R	October 31, 2016

==== Results ====
Louisiana's 1st congressional district, 2016
Party	Candidate	Votes	%
Republican	Steve Scalise (incumbent)	243,645	74.6
Democratic	Lee Ann Dugas	41,840	12.8
Democratic	Danil Faust	12,708	3.9
Libertarian	Howard Kearney	9,405	2.9
Democratic	Joe Swider	9,237	2.8
Green	Eliot Barron	6,717	2.1
Independent	Chuemai Yang	3,236	1.0
Total votes		326,788	100.0
Republican hold			

== District 2 ==
2016 Louisiana's 2nd congressional district election
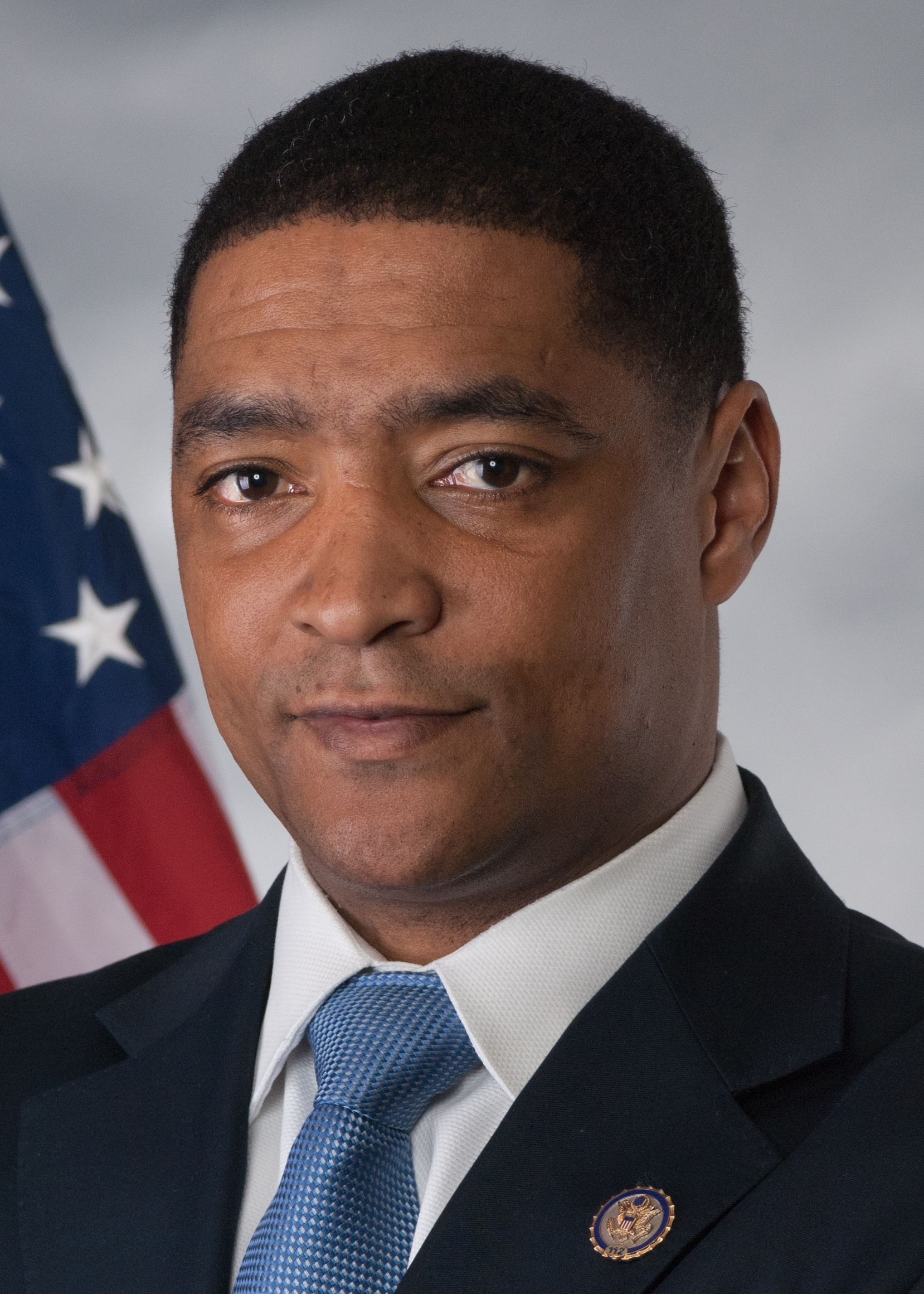

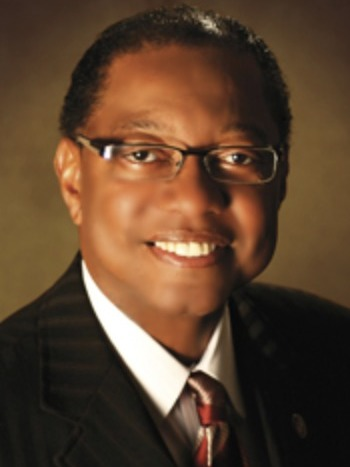

Candidate	Cedric Richmond	Kip Holden	Kenneth Cutno
Party	Democratic	Democratic	Democratic
Popular vote	198,289	57,125	28,855
Percentage	69.8%	20.1%	10.1%
- Parish results Richmond: 40–50% 50–60% 60–70% 70–80% Holden: 40–50%
U.S. Representative before election
Cedric Richmond
Democratic
Elected U.S. Representative
Cedric Richmond
Democratic

Incumbent Democrat Cedric Richmond, who had represented the district since 2011, ran for re-election. He was re-elected with 69% of the vote in 2014. The district had a PVI of D+23.

=== Candidates ===
==== Democratic ====
===== Declared =====
- Kenneth Cutno
- Kip Holden, mayor-president of East Baton Rouge Parish and candidate for lieutenant governor in 2015
- Cedric Richmond, incumbent U.S. Representative

==== Libertarian ====
===== Withdrawn =====
- Samuel Davenport, candidate for this seat in 2014

=== General election ===
==== Predictions ====
Source	Ranking	As of
The Cook Political Report	Safe D	November 7, 2016
Daily Kos Elections	Safe D	November 7, 2016
Rothenberg	Safe D	November 3, 2016
Sabato's Crystal Ball	Safe D	November 7, 2016
RCP	Safe D	October 31, 2016

==== Results ====
Louisiana's 2nd congressional district, 2016
Party	Candidate	Votes	%
Democratic	Cedric Richmond (incumbent)	198,289	69.8
Democratic	Kip Holden	57,125	20.1
Democratic	Kenneth Cutno	28,855	10.1
Total votes		284,269	100.0
Democratic hold			

== District 3 ==
2016 Louisiana's 3rd congressional district election
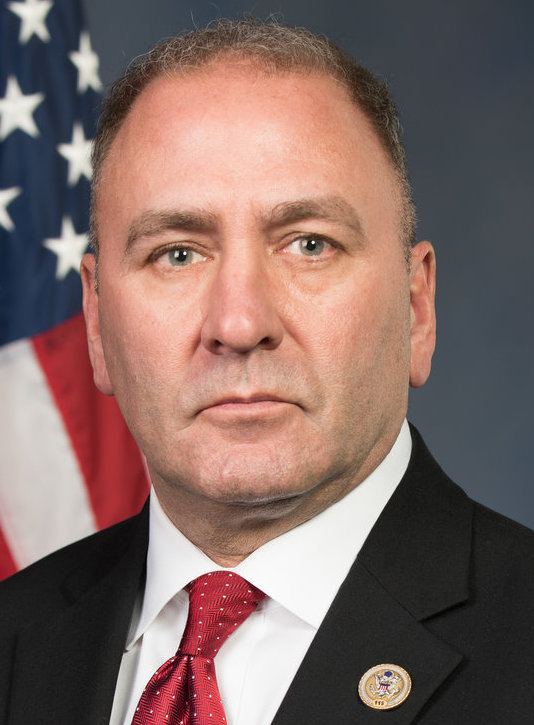

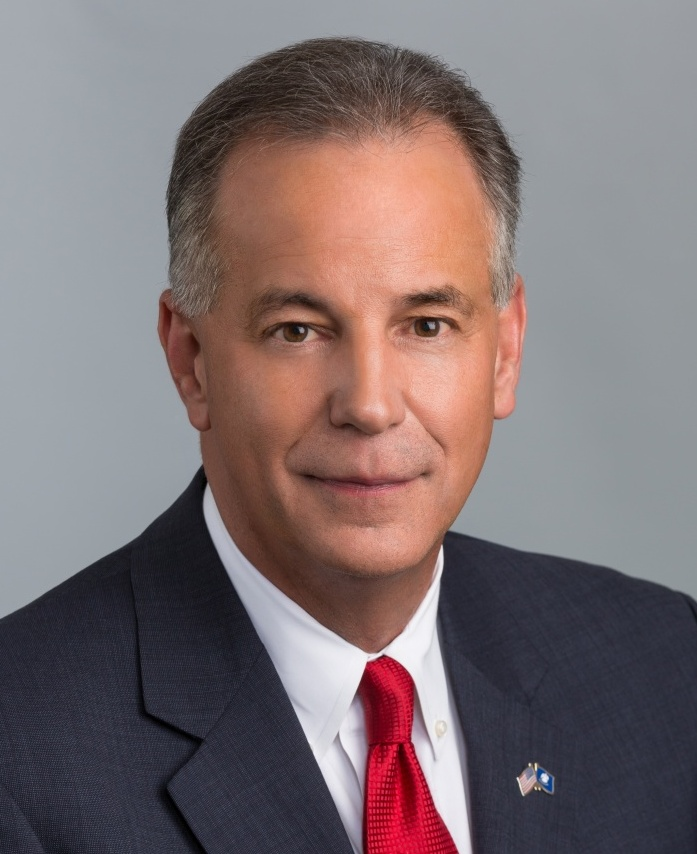

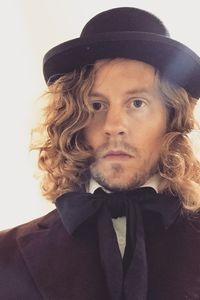
Candidate	Clay Higgins	Scott Angelle	Jacob "Dorian Phibian" Hebert
Party	Republican	Republican	Democratic
First round	84,912; 26.5%	91,532; 28.6%	28,385; 8.9%
Runoff	77,671; 56.1%	60,762; 43.9%	Eliminated
Candidate	Larry Rader	Gus Rantz
Party	Democratic	Republican
First round	27,830; 8.7%	25,662; 8.0%
Runoff	Eliminated	Eliminated
- Higgins: 30–40% 40–50% 50–60% 60–70% 70–80% Angelle: 20–30% 30–40% 40–50% 50–60%
U.S. Representative before election
Charles Boustany
Republican
Elected U.S. Representative
Clay Higgins
Republican

Incumbent Republican Charles Boustany, who had represented the 3rd district since 2013, and previously represented the 7th district from 2005 to 2013, ran for the United States Senate.

=== Candidates ===
==== Republican ====
Declared

- Scott Angelle, Public Service Commissioner, former Lieutenant Governor of Louisiana and candidate for governor in 2015
- Bryan Barrilleaux, physician and candidate in 2012 and 2014
- Greg Ellison, energy executive, retired lieutenant colonel
- Brett Geymann, state representative
- Clay Higgins, deputy marshal of Lafayette, former public information officer and captain of St. Landry Parish Sheriff's Office
- Gus Rantz, businessman
- Grover J. Rees III, former United States Ambassador to East Timor
- Herman Vidrine, retired state employee

Withdrawn

- Erick Knezek, Lafayette School Board member

==== Democratic ====
Declared

- Jacob "Dorian Phibian" Hebert, artist and musician
- Larry Rader, 2011 Democratic candidate for District 49 of the Louisiana House of Representatives

==== Libertarian ====
Declared

- Guy McLendon, Texarkana Regional Director of the Gary Johnson 2016 campaign for president, and previously served on the Libertarian Party National Committee, Texas vice-chair, chair of Harris County, Texas, Louisiana vice-chair, and four terms on the LP National Platform Committees – 2006, 2008, 2010 and 2014

==== Independent ====
Declared

- Kenny P. Scelfo Sr., candidate for mayor of Franklin in 2014, Franklin City Councilman, Franklin mayor pro tempore

=== Endorsements ===
Scott Angelle

U.S. Representatives

- Charles Boustany, incumbent U.S. Representative
Grover J. Rees III

Local officials

- Dud Lastrapes, former Mayor of Lafayette

Individuals

- John Bolton, former United States Ambassador to the United Nations

=== General election ===
==== Predictions ====
Source	Ranking	As of
The Cook Political Report	Safe R	November 7, 2016
Daily Kos Elections	Safe R	November 7, 2016
Rothenberg	Safe R	November 3, 2016
Sabato's Crystal Ball	Safe R	November 7, 2016
RCP	Safe R	October 31, 2016

==== Jungle primary ====
Louisiana's 3rd congressional district, 2016
Party	Candidate	Votes	%
Republican	Scott Angelle	91,532	28.6
Republican	Clay Higgins	84,912	26.5
Democratic	Jacob "Dorian Phibian" Hebert	28,385	8.9
Democratic	Larry Rader	27,830	8.7
Republican	Gus Rantz	25,662	8.0
Republican	Greg Ellison	24,882	7.8
Republican	Brett Geymann	21,607	6.7
Republican	Bryan Barrilleaux	6,223	1.9
Libertarian	Guy McLendon	2,937	0.9
Independent	Kenny P. Scelfo, Sr.	2,670	0.8
Republican	Grover J. Rees III	2,457	0.8
Republican	Herman Vidrine	1,357	0.4
Total votes		320,454	100.0

==== Runoff ====
Louisiana's 3rd congressional district runoff, 2016
Party	Candidate	Votes	%
Republican	Clay Higgins	77,671	56.1
Republican	Scott Angelle	60,762	43.9
Total votes		138,433	100.0
Republican hold			

== District 4 ==
2016 Louisiana's 4th congressional district election
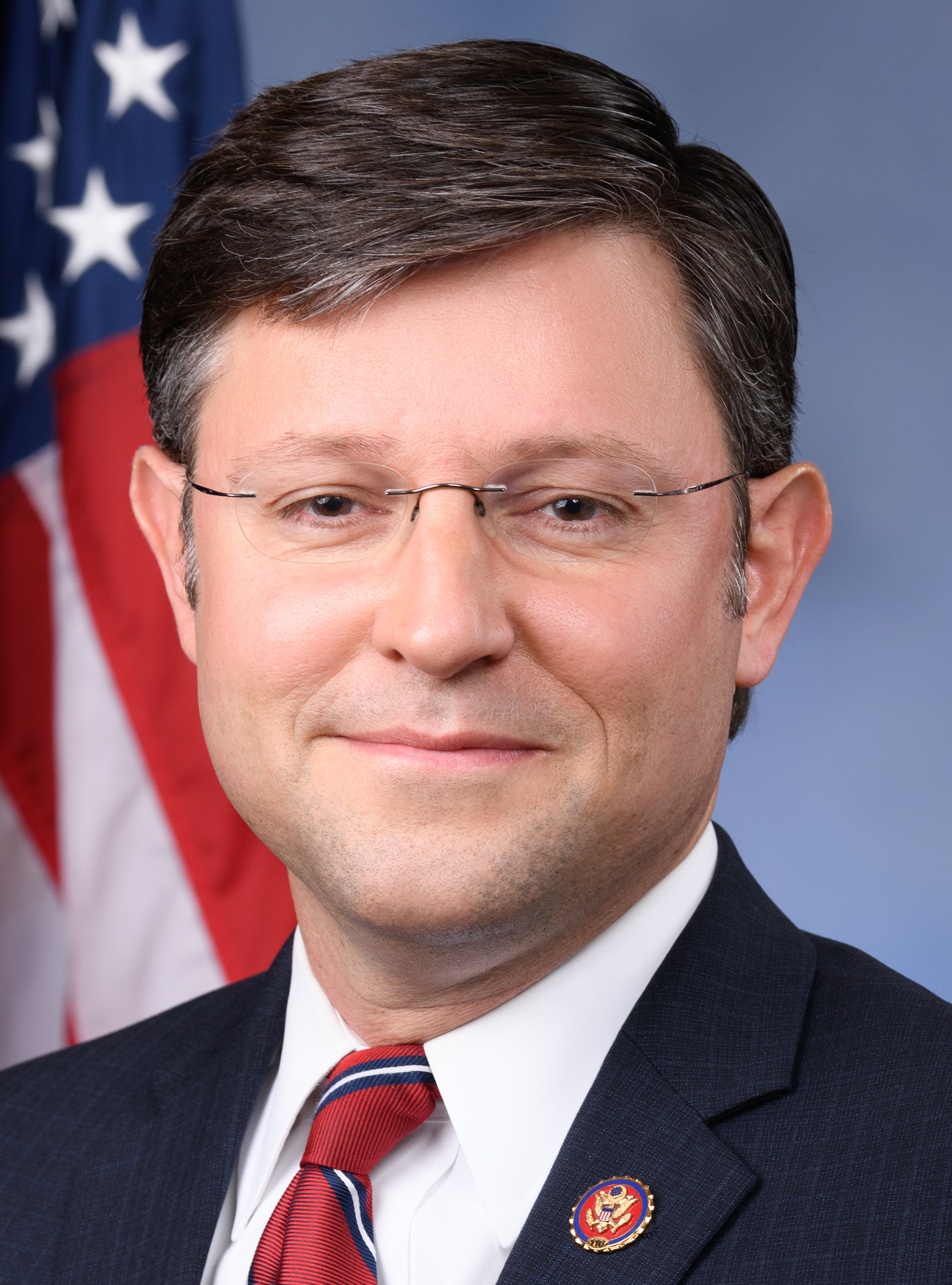

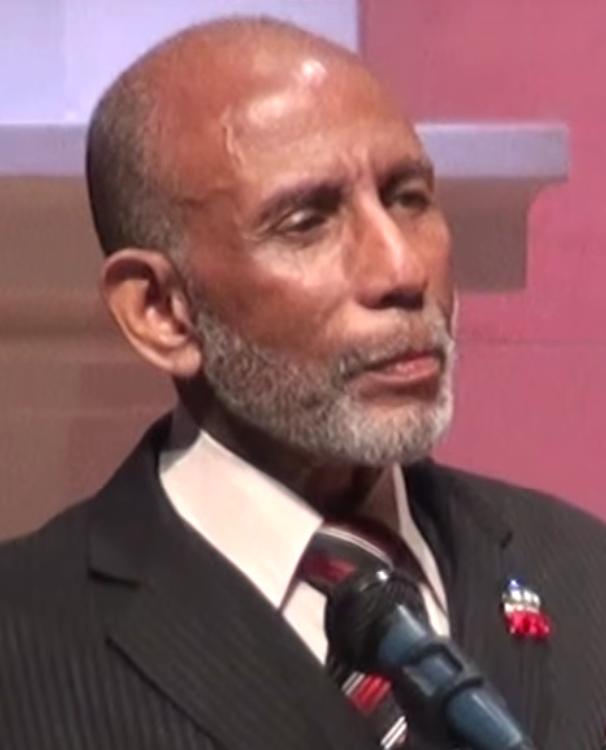
Candidate	Mike Johnson	Marshall Jones	Trey Baucum
Party	Republican	Democratic	Republican
First round	70,580; 24.7%	80,593; 28.2%	50,412; 17.6%
Runoff	87,369; 65.2%	46,578; 34.8%	Eliminated
Candidate	Oliver Jenkins	Elbert Guillory
Party	Republican	Republican
First round	44,521; 15.6%	21,017; 7.4%
Runoff	Eliminated	Eliminated
- Johnson: 20–30% 30–40% 50–60% 60–70% 70–80% 80–90% Jones: 30–40% 40–50% Baucum: 20–30% Jenkins: 20–30% Guillory: 40–50%
U.S. Representative before election
John Fleming
Republican
Elected U.S. Representative
Mike Johnson
Republican

Incumbent Republican John Fleming, who had represented the 4th district since 2009, ran for the United States Senate.

=== Candidates ===
==== Republican ====
Declared

- Trey Baucum, Shreveport cardiologist
- Elbert Guillory, former state senator from Opelousas and candidate for lieutenant governor in 2015
- Oliver Jenkins, Shreveport City Councilman
- Rick John, attorney
- Mike Johnson, state representative

Declined

- Jim Morris, state representative
- Barrow Peacock, state senator
- Mike Reese, businessman
- Rocky Rockett, president of the Greater Bossier Economic Development Foundation
- Alan Seabaugh, state representative

==== Democratic ====
Declared

- Marshall Jones, attorney and candidate in 1988

Declined

- LaLeshia Walker Alford, former Shreveport City Court Judge and candidate for Caddo Parish District Attorney in 2015
- LaBrisha Almond, real estate agent and candidate for congress in 2000
- Cedric Glover, state representative and former Mayor of Shreveport
- Keith Hightower, former mayor of Shreveport
- Patrick Jefferson, state representative

==== Independent ====
Declared

- Mark Halverson
- Kenneth Kreft

=== Endorsements ===
Mike Johnson

Organizations

- Club for Growth
- Gun Owners of America

=== General election ===
==== Predictions ====
Source	Ranking	As of
The Cook Political Report	Safe R	November 7, 2016
Daily Kos Elections	Safe R	November 7, 2016
Rothenberg	Safe R	November 3, 2016
Sabato's Crystal Ball	Safe R	November 7, 2016
RCP	Safe R	October 31, 2016

==== Jungle primary ====
Louisiana's 4th congressional district, 2016
Party	Candidate	Votes	%
Democratic	Marshall Jones	80,593	28.2
Republican	Mike Johnson	70,580	24.7
Republican	Trey Baucum	50,412	17.6
Republican	Oliver Jenkins	44,521	15.6
Republican	Elbert Guillory	21,017	7.4
Republican	Rick John	13,220	4.6
Independent	Mark Halverson	3,149	1.1
Independent	Kenneth Kreft	2,493	0.9
Total votes		285,985	100.0

==== Runoff ====
Louisiana's 4th congressional district runoff, 2016
Party	Candidate	Votes	%
Republican	Mike Johnson	87,370	65.2
Democratic	Marshall Jones	46,579	34.8
Total votes		133,949	100.0
Republican hold			

== District 5 ==
2016 Louisiana's 5th congressional district election
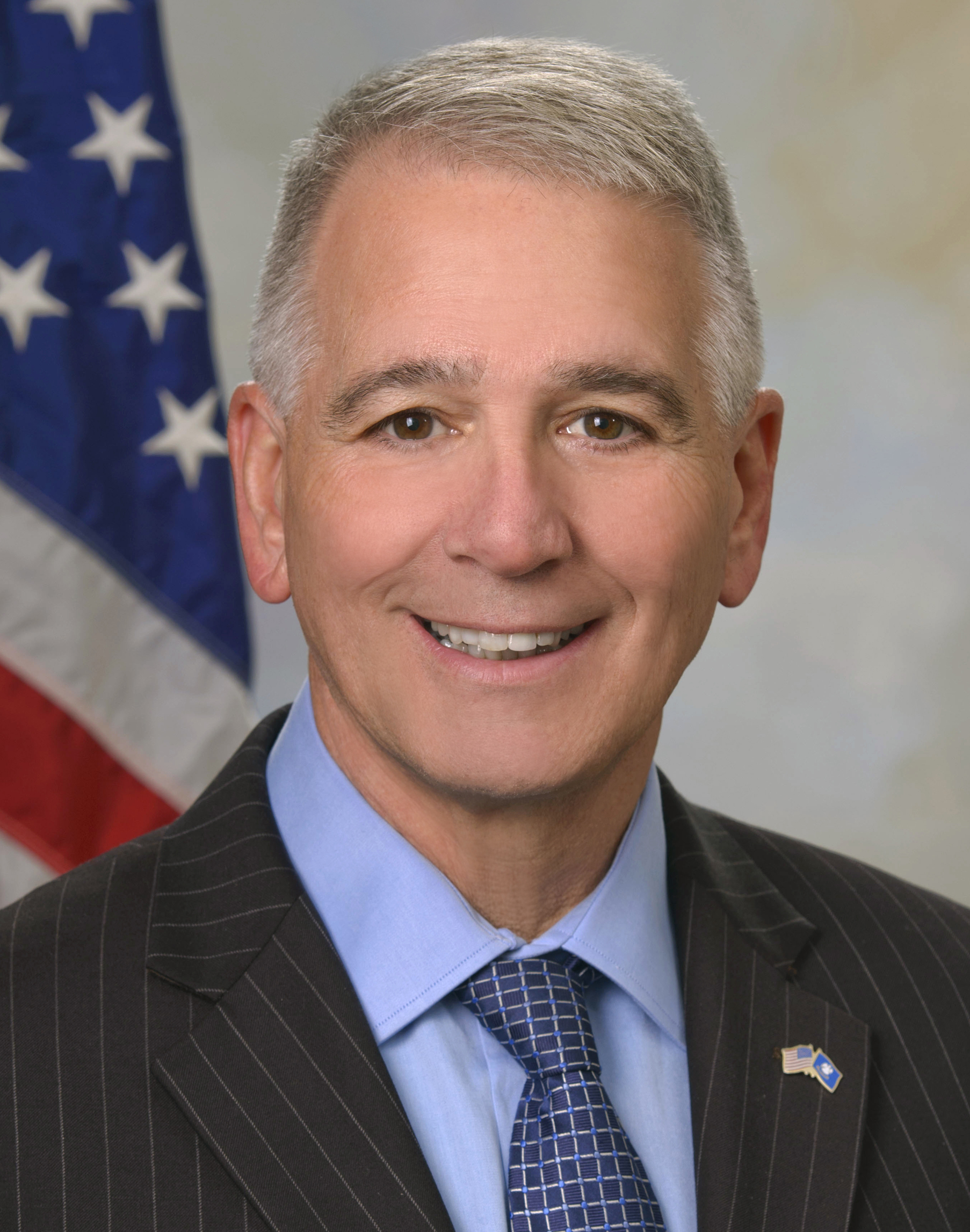

Candidate	Ralph Abraham	Billy Burkette
Party	Republican	Republican
Popular vote	208,545	47,117
Percentage	81.6%	18.4%
- Parish results Abraham: 50–60% 60–70% 70–80% 80–90% >90%
U.S. Representative before election
Ralph Abraham
Republican
Elected U.S. Representative
Ralph Abraham
Republican

The incumbent was Republican Ralph Abraham, who had represented the district since 2015. He was elected with 64% of the vote in the 2014 runoff election.

=== Candidates ===
==== Republican ====
Declared

- Ralph Abraham, incumbent U.S. Representative
- Billy Burkette

=== General election ===
==== Predictions ====
Source	Ranking	As of
The Cook Political Report	Safe R	November 7, 2016
Daily Kos Elections	Safe R	November 7, 2016
Rothenberg	Safe R	November 3, 2016
Sabato's Crystal Ball	Safe R	November 7, 2016
RCP	Safe R	October 31, 2016

==== Results ====
Louisiana's 5th congressional district, 2016
Party	Candidate	Votes	%
Republican	Ralph Abraham (incumbent)	208,545	81.6
Republican	Billy Burkette	47,117	18.4
Total votes		255,662	100.0
Republican hold			

== District 6 ==
2016 Louisiana's 6th congressional district election
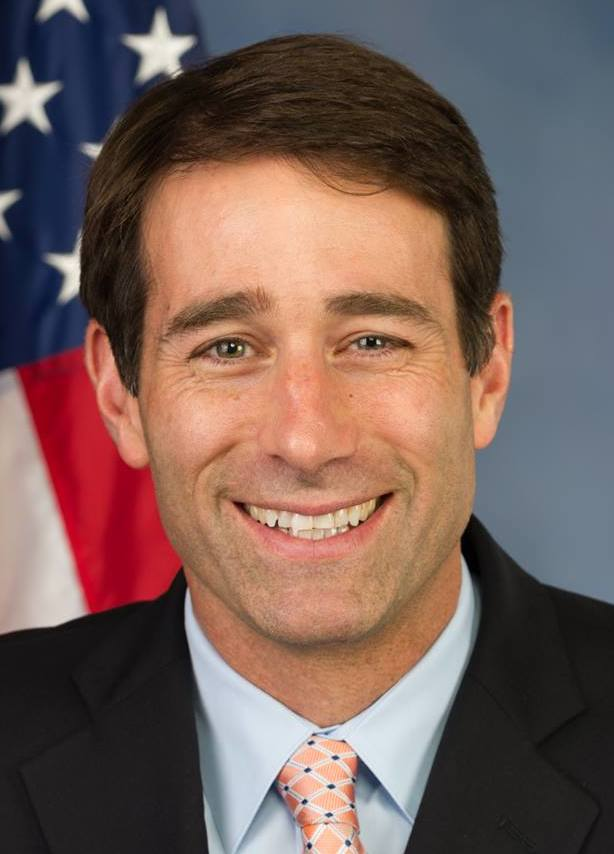

Candidate	Garret Graves	Richard Lieberman
Party	Republican	Democratic
Popular vote	207,483	49,380
Percentage	62.7%	14.9%
Candidate	Bob Bell	Jermaine Sampson
Party	Republican	Democratic
Popular vote	33,592	29,822
Percentage	10.1%	9.0%
- Parish results Graves: 30–40% 40–50% 50–60% 60–70% 70–80%
U.S. Representative before election
Garret Graves
Republican
Elected U.S. Representative
Garret Graves
Republican

Incumbent Republican Garret Graves, who had represented the district since 2015. He was elected with 62% of the vote in the 2014 runoff election over former four-term governor and convicted felon Edwin Washington Edwards, who represented the now-defunct 7th district from 1965 until his first election as governor in 1972.

=== Candidates ===
==== Republican ====
Declared

- Bob Bell, retired navy captain and candidate for this seat in 2014
- Garret Graves, incumbent U.S. Representative

==== Democratic ====
Declared

- Richard Lieberman, real estate broker and candidate for this seat in 2014

==== Libertarian ====
Declared

- Richard Fontanesi

==== Independent ====
Declared

- Devin Graham

=== General election ===
==== Predictions ====
Source	Ranking	As of
The Cook Political Report	Safe R	November 7, 2016
Daily Kos Elections	Safe R	November 7, 2016
Rothenberg	Safe R	November 3, 2016
Sabato's Crystal Ball	Safe R	November 7, 2016
RCP	Safe R	October 31, 2016

==== Results ====
Louisiana's 6th congressional district, 2016
Party	Candidate	Votes	%
Republican	Garret Graves (incumbent)	207,483	62.7
Democratic	Richard Lieberman	49,380	14.9
Republican	Bob Bell	33,592	10.1
Democratic	Jermaine Sampson	29,822	9.0
Libertarian	Richard Fontanesi	7,603	2.3
Independent	Devin Graham	3,218	1.0
Total votes		331,098	100.0
Republican hold			
