= Louisiana's 35th House of Representatives district =

American legislative district

Louisiana's 35th State House of Representatives district
Representative
Brett Geymann; R–Lake Charles

Louisiana's 35th House of Representatives district is one of 105 Louisiana House of Representatives districts. It is currently represented by Republican Brett Geymann of Lake Charles.

== Geography ==
HD35 includes a small part of the city of Lake Charles.

== Election results ==
Year	Winning candidate	Party	Percent	Opponent	Party	Percent
2011	Brett Geymann	Republican	100%			
2015	Stephen Dwight	Republican	100%			
2019	Stephen Dwight	Republican	72.7%	Jacob Marceaux	Republican	27.3%
2023	Brett Geymann	Republican	Cancelled			
