= 2015 Louisiana lieutenant gubernatorial election =

- October 24, 2015 (first round); November 21, 2015 (runoff)
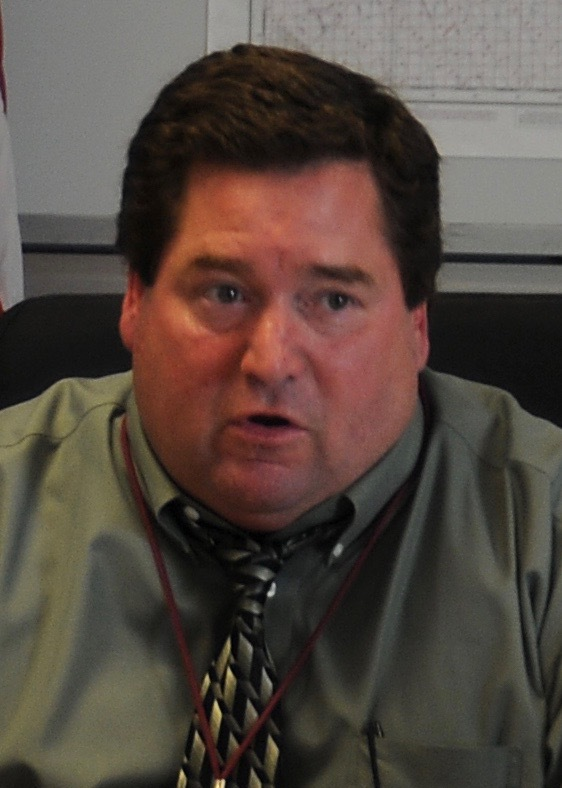

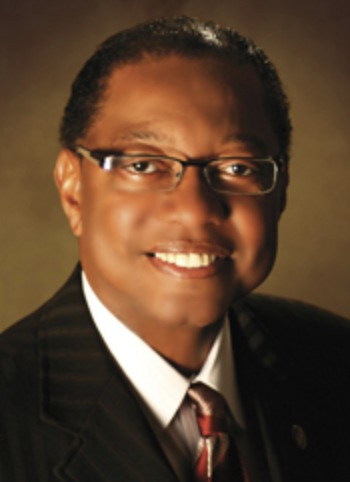

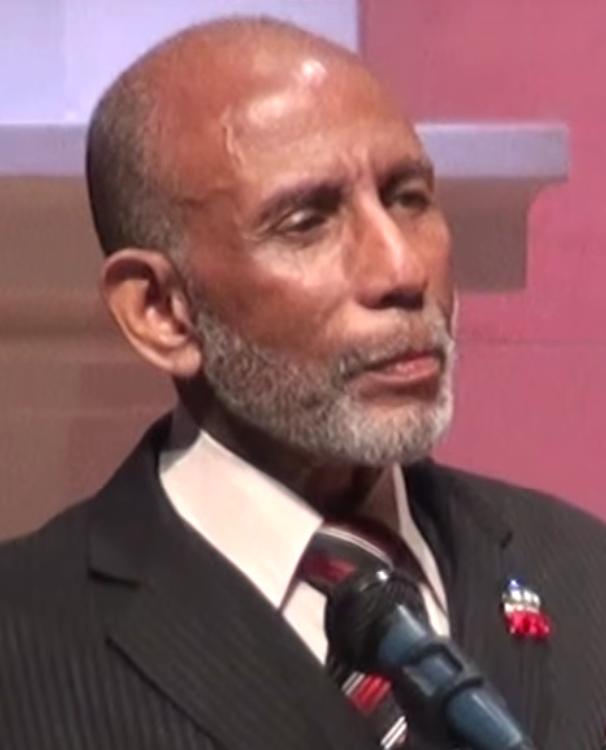
Nominee	Billy Nungesser	Kip Holden
Party	Republican	Democratic
First round	324,654; 29.95%	360,679; 33.27%
Runoff	628,864; 55.38%	506,578; 44.62%
Nominee	John Young	Elbert Guillory
Party	Republican	Republican
First round	313,183; 28.89%	85,460; 7.88%
Runoff	Eliminated	Eliminated
- Nungesser: 20–30% 30–40% 40–50% 50–60% 60–70% 70–80% 80–90% Holden: 20–30% 30–40% 40–50% 50–60% 60–70% 70–80% 80–90% >90% Young: 20–30% 30–40% 40–50% 50–60% 60–70% 70–80% 80–90% >90% Guillory: 20–30% 30–40% 40–50% 70–80% Tie: 30–40% 40–50% 50% No votes Nungesser: 20–30% 30–40% 40–50% 50–60% 60–70% 70–80% 80–90% Holden: 20–30% 30–40% 40–50% 50–60% 60–70% 70–80% 80–90% >90% Young: 20–30% 30–40% 40–50% 50–60% 60–70% 70–80% 80–90% >90% Guillory: 20–30% 30–40% 40–50% 70–80% Tie: 30–40% 40–50% 50% No votes Nungesser: 50–60% 60–70% 70–80% 80–90% >90% Holden: 50–60% 60–70% 70–80% 80–90% >90% Tie: 50% No votes Nungesser: 50–60% 60–70% 70–80% 80–90% >90% Holden: 50–60% 60–70% 70–80% 80–90% >90% Tie: 50% No votes Nungesser: 50–60% 60–70% 70–80% 80–90% >90% Holden: 50–60% 60–70% 70–80% 80–90% >90% Tie: 50% No votes
Lieutenant Governor before election
Jay Dardenne
Republican
Elected Lieutenant Governor
Billy Nungesser
Republican

The 2015 Louisiana lieutenant gubernatorial election took place on October 24, 2015, to elect the Lieutenant Governor of Louisiana, with a runoff election held on November 21, 2015. Incumbent Republican Lieutenant Governor Jay Dardenne did not run for re-election to a second full term in office. He instead ran for governor. Billy Nungesser won the election with more than 55% of votes, defeating Kip Holden despite a Democratic victory in the gubernatorial election, in which John Bel Edwards defeated David Vitter by a similar margin.

Under Louisiana's jungle primary system, all candidates appeared on the same ballot, regardless of party and voters may vote for any candidate, regardless of their party affiliation. Since no candidate received a majority of the vote during the primary election, a runoff election was held on November 21, 2015, between Holden and Nungesser. Louisiana is the only state that has a jungle primary system (California and Washington have a similar "top two primary" system).

== Candidates ==
=== Republican Party ===
==== Filed ====
- Elbert Guillory, state senator
- Billy Nungesser, President of Plaquemines Parish and candidate for lieutenant governor in 2011
- John Young, President of Jefferson Parish

==== Declined ====
- Scott Angelle, Louisiana Public Service Commissioner and former lieutenant governor (ran for governor)
- Jay Dardenne, incumbent lieutenant governor (ran for governor)
- Mike Edmonson, Superintendent of the Louisiana State Police

=== Democratic Party ===
==== Filed ====
- Kip Holden, Mayor-President of East Baton Rouge Parish

==== Did not run ====
- Rick Gallot, state senator

== Jungle primary ==
=== Polling ===
Poll source	Date(s) administered	Sample size	Margin of error	Elbert Guillory (R)	Kip Holden (D)	Billy Nungesser (R)	John Young (R)	Undecided
Triumph	March 5, 2015	1,655	± 2.4%	2%	33%	23%	20%	22%
Multi-Quest	October 22–24, 2014	606	± 4%	—	8%	10%	10%	72%

=== Results ===
Louisiana lieutenant gubernatorial election Jungle Primary, 2015
Party	Candidate	Votes	%
Democratic	Kip Holden	360,679	33.27
Republican	Billy Nungesser	324,654	29.95
Republican	John Young	313,183	28.89
Republican	Elbert Guillory	85,460	7.88
Majority		36,025	3.32
Total votes		1,083,976	37.4

== Runoff ==
=== Results ===
Louisiana lieutenant gubernatorial election runoff, 2015
Party	Candidate	Votes	%	±%
Republican	Billy Nungesser	628,864	55.4%	+25.45%
Democratic	Kip Holden	506,578	44.6%	+11.66%
Majority		122,286	10.8%	+7.48%
Turnout		1,135,442	100.0%	+62.6%
Republican hold				

==== By congressional district ====
Nungesser won five of six congressional districts.

District	Nungesser	Holden	Representative
1st	74%	26%	Steve Scalise
2nd	29%	71%	Cedric Richmond
3rd	63%	37%	Charles Boustany
4th	55%	45%	John Fleming
5th	58%	42%	Ralph Abraham
6th	53%	47%	Garret Graves

== See also ==
- United States gubernatorial elections, 2015
- Lieutenant Governor of Louisiana
