= Abhay Patel =

American politician (born 1976)

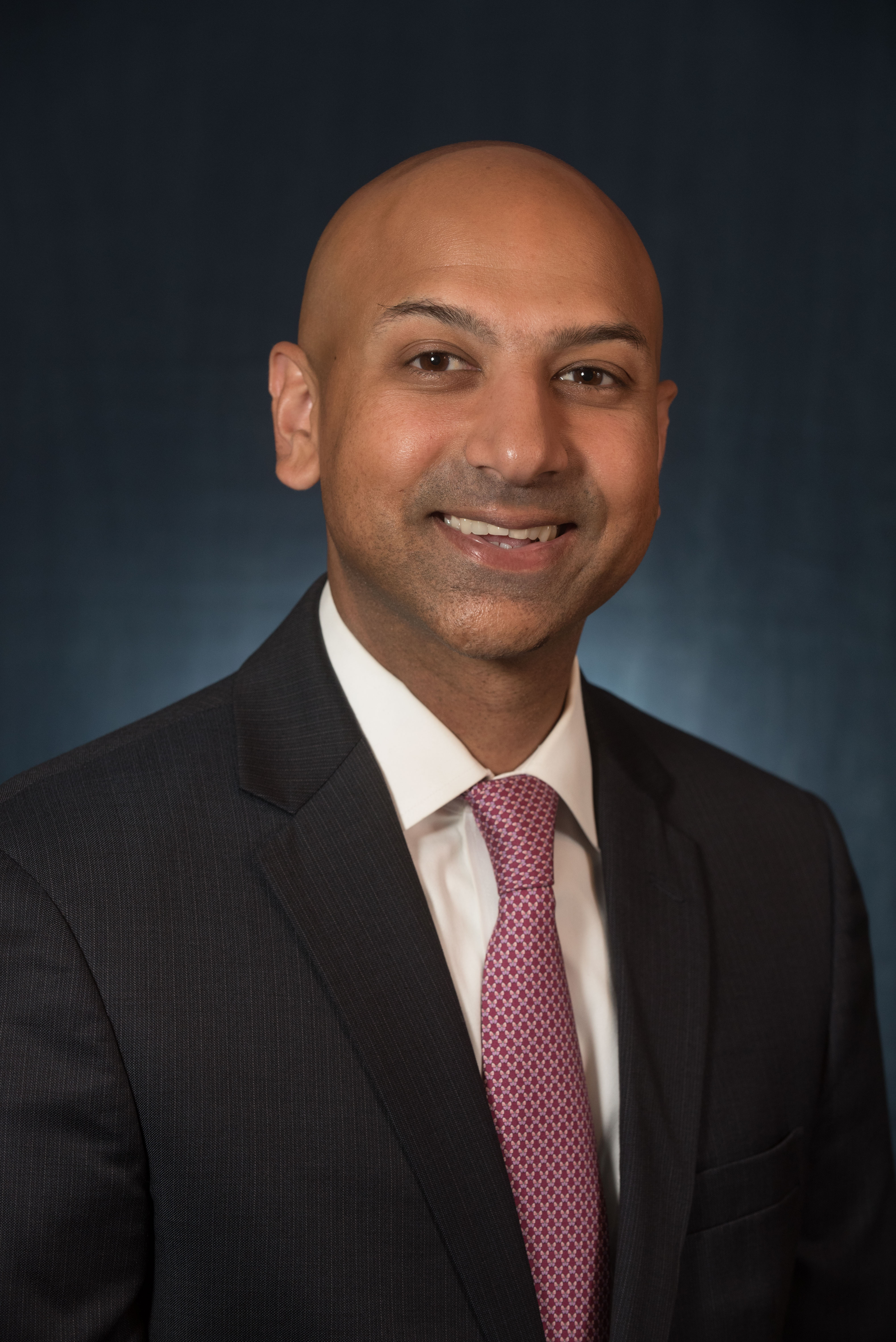
- Born: January 21, 1976 (age 50); Chicago, Illinois, U.S.
- Education: Louisiana State University
- Occupation: Businessman
- Political party: Republican
- Spouse: Nicole Pelengaris Patel
- Website: Campaign website

Abhay Patel (born January 21, 1976) is a Louisiana businessman and was a 2016 Republican candidate for the United States Senate. Patel has spent his career advising corporate leaders, raising capital to support business expansion and leading economic development.

== Early life and education ==
Patel grew up in Forest, Mississippi. Before moving there in 1982, Patel and his family lived in five other states (Illinois, Florida, Texas, Oklahoma and Louisiana), as his parents looked for stable employment and a place to permanently settle. With the help of friends, Patel's father ultimately found a small motel in Forest (Scott Motel, named for the county), which he owned and operated. The property was located on the edge of town, had 15 rentable units and doubled as his parents’ small business and home.

Patel grew up attending Forest public schools. He left Forest after his sophomore year of high school to attend The Mississippi School for Math and Science, a residential high school for juniors and seniors. From there, Patel earned a full scholarship to Louisiana State University, bringing him back to Louisiana, where he attended kindergarten.

Patel earned his bachelor's degree in finance from Louisiana State University and graduated summa cum laude. Patel earned a Juris Doctor (J.D.) with honors from the Boston University School of Law. His area of concentration was Constitutional Law.

== Business career ==
Patel used his background in finance and law to work as an investment banker for many years. During that time, he helped many leading U.S. companies navigate some of the country's most tumultuous economic times—including the 2001 recession, 9/11, the mortgage crisis and the great recession.

Patel helped raise more than $30 billion of debt and equity capital in the private sector. He also worked on several high-profile advisory transactions.

Patel's investment banking clients included American Airlines, General Electric, Goodyear Tire and Rubber, Harley-Davidson and Hertz.

Most recently, Patel served as Vice President of Business Development for the New Orleans Business Alliance (NOLABA), where he led the implementation of ProsperityNOLA, the city's five-year growth plan. At NOLABA, Patel worked closely with academic, business and community leaders across Louisiana to identify opportunities for economic growth.

In addition, Patel led the firm's Business Retention, Expansion and Attraction platform, where he worked with local businesses and recruited young and growing companies to the area—a key part of the city's and state's economic development strategy.

== Controversy ==
Patel was subjected to a hate attack by Infostormer.Com., who called him a "mud monkey" and "open defecation activist". Patel dropped out of the race, to the Louisiana Senate and endorsed Charles Boustany, who narrowly missed making the runoff election.

== Personal life ==
Abhay and his wife Nicole Pelengaris Patel live in New Orleans.
