= Clay Higgins =

American politician (born 1961)

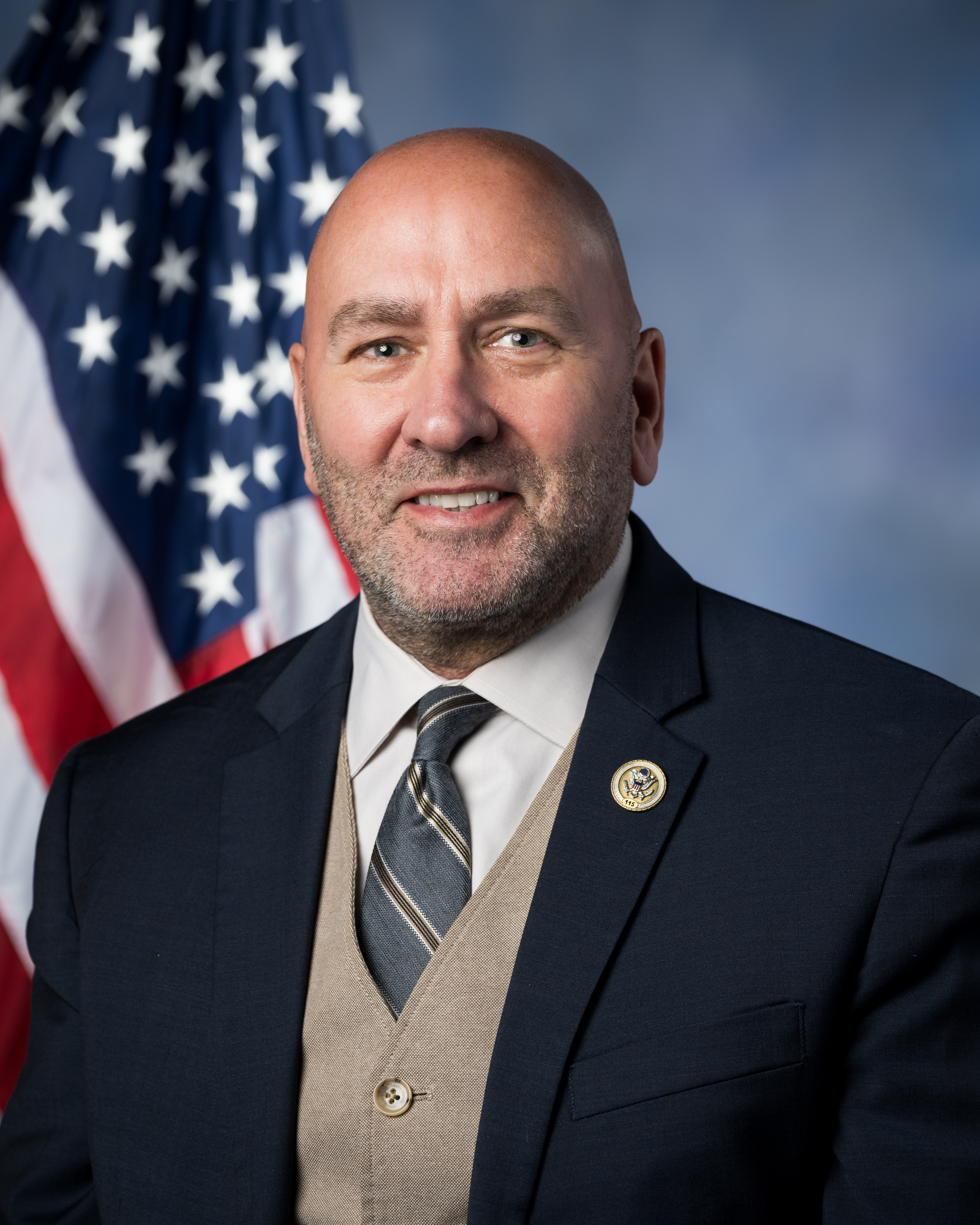
- Official portrait, 2024

Member of the U.S. House of Representatives from Louisiana's 3rd district
- Incumbent
- Assumed office January 3, 2017
- Preceded by: Charles Boustany

Personal details
- Born: Glen Clay Higgins; August 24, 1961 (age 65) New Orleans, Louisiana, U.S.
- Party: Republican
- Spouse(s): Eloisa Rovati (m. 1983; div. 1991) Rosemary Rothkamm-Hambrice (m. 1991; div. 1999) Kara Seymour (m. 2003; div. 2007) Becca Higgins (m. 2009)
- Children: 4
- Education: Louisiana State University (attended)
- Website: House website Campaign website

Military service
- Branch/service: United States Army; Louisiana National Guard
- Years of service: 1979–1985
- Rank: Staff Sergeant
- Unit: Military Police Corps
- Police career
- Department: Opelousas City Police Department; Port Barre Police Department; St. Landry Parish Sheriff's Office; Lafayette City Marshal; Louisiana Department of Justice
- Service years: 2005–2007 (Opelousas); 2007–2010 (Port Barre); 2011–2016 (Sheriff's Office); 2016–2019 (City Marshal); 2019–present (Louisiana Department of Justice)
- Rank: Captain
- Higgins's voice Higgins on the District of Columbia Policing Protection Act. Recorded September 17, 2025

Glen Clay Higgins (born August 24, 1961) is an American politician and reserve law enforcement officer from the state of Louisiana. A Republican, Higgins is the U.S. representative for Louisiana's 3rd congressional district. The district, which contains much of the territory once represented by former governor Edwin Edwards and former U.S. senator John Breaux, is in the southwestern corner of the state and includes Lafayette, Lake Charles, and New Iberia. Higgins won the runoff election on December 10, 2016, defeating fellow Republican Scott Angelle.

As well as being an elected official, Higgins continues to hold a law enforcement commission in a reserve capacity with the Louisiana attorney general's office. Higgins has appeared and spoken at events organized by groups such as the Three Percenters and the Oath Keepers, and has claimed to be a "Three Percenter" at speaking engagements. He is a member of the House Freedom Caucus, and critics argue that his views are far-right. Higgins was the sole member of Congress to vote against the Epstein Files Transparency Act.

== Early life and education ==
Higgins is the seventh of eight children. He was born in New Orleans, and his family moved to Covington, Louisiana, when he was six years old. The family raised and trained horses. After graduation from Covington High School, he attended Louisiana State University in Baton Rouge, Louisiana, but did not graduate.

== Career ==
At age 18, Higgins enlisted in the Military Police Corps of the Louisiana National Guard, serving for six years (1979–85) and reaching the rank of staff sergeant. Higgins supported the 1992 presidential campaign of Pat Buchanan and the gubernatorial campaign of Ku Klux Klan leader David Duke, despite Higgins describing Duke as a "Nazi" to an Atlanta Journal-Constitution reporter.

He worked for several years as a manager of car dealerships.

=== Local law enforcement ===
In 2004, Higgins became a patrol officer for the Opelousas City police department. By 2007, police chief Perry Gallow was prepared to take major disciplinary action against Higgins who was accused of beating a Black man who was handcuffed, then lying about it. In a letter to the city council, the police chief wrote, "Clay Higgins used unnecessary force on a subject during the execution of a warrant and later gave false statements during an internal investigation...although he later recanted his story and admitted to striking a suspect in handcuffs and later releasing him". Higgins resigned before disciplinary action could be imposed.

The other patrolman involved in the 2007 incident, John Chautin, was later hired as a member of Higgins' congressional office in 2017. Chautin was first hired as a field representative but as of 2025, works as Higgins' district office director.

During the 2007 investigation, Higgins was caught in his SWAT vehicle and gear making an alcohol purchase at a gas station in violation of department rules. Higgins and another officer were heading to a competition including other members of the SWAT team. St. Landry Sheriff Bobby Guidroz would later claim he would have never hired Higgins had he known of these events.

In September 2016, during his congressional campaign, Higgins claimed to have resigned from the police force for other reasons, calling Gallow "a peacock, a colorful, flightless bird". Gallow, by then retired as police chief, publicly disputed Higgins's version of events.

Higgins worked for the Port Barre police department through 2010. In 2011, he joined the St. Landry Parish sheriff's office. After the office's public information officer was reassigned in October 2014, Higgins was appointed to the position and promoted to captain. As public information officer, Higgins made videos for the parish Crime Stoppers program. He first used standard scripts, but began to improvise in his own style, appealing to suspects to surrender and sometimes threatening them by name. His videos went viral, and in 2015 he was described by national media as the "Cajun John Wayne" for his intimidating persona. Sheriff Bobby Guidroz urged restraint, advising Higgins to refrain from personal comments about suspects and to keep a professional tone in his videos.

Higgins filmed a video for the state police, with a script that prompted protests from suspects' families and the ACLU. He resigned from the St. Landry Parish sheriff's office in February 2016. Guidroz had warned him against using disrespectful and demeaning language about suspects, ordering him to "Tone down his unprofessional comments on our weekly Crime Stoppers messages". He issued a statement saying that Higgins's comments underlined "a growing undertone of insubordination and lack of discipline on Higgins' part". Guidroz said that Higgins had gone against department policy by misusing his badge and uniform for personal profit and gain, citing Higgins's wearing a uniform in an ad for a security firm. He also reprimanded Higgins for using his badge and uniform on his personal website to support sales of T-shirts and shot glasses for his limited liability corporation (LLC). Higgins had also used the department's physical address in registering his corporation with the state. Both actions were against department policy.

Salon reported that during this period, Higgins "negotiated paid speaking appearances with other police departments. In one email, Higgins discussed his request for a speaker's fee that included shopping money for his wife and part of the fuel for a friend's private plane." He asked for cash payments. Higgins also conducted his private business via email on "his government email-account during work hours without the permission or knowledge of his supervisors. Higgins also appears to have attempted to conceal his earnings from the IRS in order to avoid wage garnishment for unpaid taxes. Whether those actions constitute tax fraud is unclear."

Shortly after resigning from St. Landry Parish, in March 2016, Higgins was accepted and sworn in as a reserve deputy marshal in the city of Lafayette, Louisiana. Reserve forces in city and Parish sheriff's offices in Louisiana receive regular training and are commissioned as law enforcement officers. They are part-time and made up of persons from many walks of life.

In 2019, Higgins retired his commission as a reserve deputy marshal. He maintains an active law enforcement commission as a reserve officer with the Louisiana attorney general's office.

=== Honors ===
Higgins was awarded the title of Kentucky colonel in March 2016 by Kentucky governor Matt Bevin.

== U.S. House of Representatives ==
=== Elections ===
==== 2016 ====
After Higgins resigned from the St. Landry sheriff's office, Chris Comeaux, a Republican campaign staffer, recruited him to run for office. In May 2016, Higgins declared his candidacy in the 2016 election in the 3rd district. He crossed district lines to run for this seat, as his home in Port Barre is in the neighboring 5th district. Members of the House are only constitutionally required to live in the state they represent. A super PAC headed by US senator David Vitter's former chief of staff supported Higgins's candidacy.

Higgins finished second in the nonpartisan blanket primary held on November 8, behind Republican Scott Angelle, in which nearly 68% of the parish voted. He faced Angelle in a runoff election on December 10 and won with 56.1% of the vote; turnout had declined to about 28% of voters.

==== 2018 ====
Higgins was challenged by Democrats Rob Anderson, Mildred "Mimi" Methvin, Larry Rader, and Verone Thomas, Libertarian Aaron Andrus, and Republican Josh Guillory. Donald Trump endorsed Higgins. He defeated all six challengers in the jungle primary, winning reelection without a runoff.

In response to protests in response to the police shooting death of Trayford Pellerin, Higgins made a post on Facebook stating he would "drop 10 of you where you stand".

==== 2020 ====
Higgins was reelected with 67.76% of the vote to Democrat Braylon Harris's 17.89%, Democrat Rob Anderson's 11.59%, and Libertarian Brandon Leleux's 2.75%.

==== 2022 ====
Higgins was reelected with 64.3% of the vote to Republican Holden Hoggatt's 10.9%, Democrat Lessie Olivia Leblanc's 10.5%, Democrat Tia LeBrun's 9.4%, Republican Thomas "Lane" Payne, Jr.'s 1.8%, Independent Gloria R. Wiggins's 1.4%, Republican Jacob "Jake" Shaheen's 0.9%, and Libertarian Guy McLendon's 0.7%.

==== 2024 ====
Higgins was reelected with 70.6% of the vote. Democratic challengers Priscilla Gonzalez and Sadi Summerlin won 18.7% and 6.6% of the vote, respectively, while Republican challenger Xan John won 4.1%.

==== 2026 ====
Higgins was reelected with 55% of the vote. Challengers received John Day 20.9, Caleb Walker 8.5%, Priscilla Gonzalez 7.2% and Kate Cotten 6.7%.

=== Tenure ===
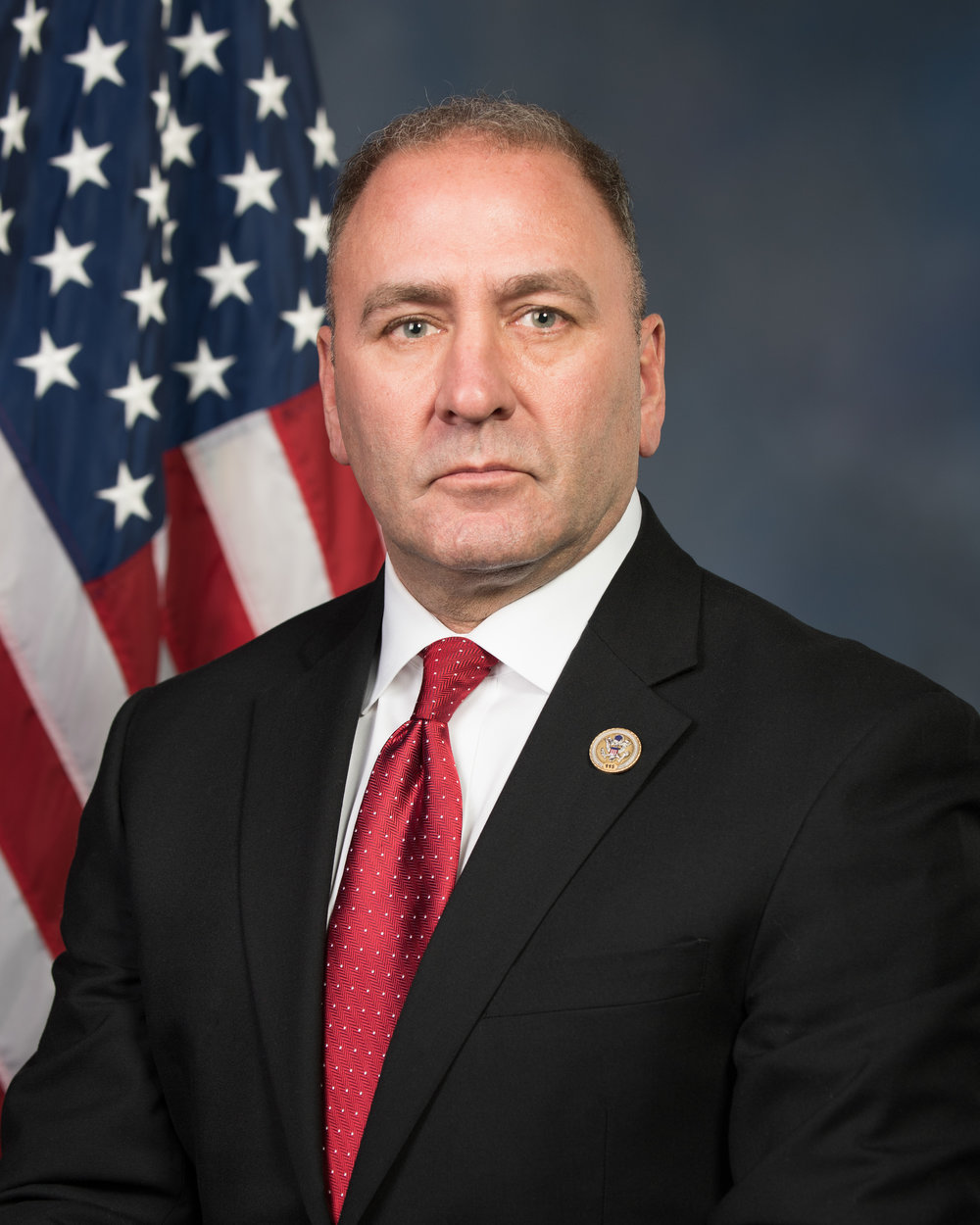
2017 portrait of Higgins during the 115th United States Congress

Higgins was sworn into the United States House of Representatives on January 3, 2017.

Higgins voted with other Republicans in favor of the American Health Care Act of 2017, which would have repealed and replaced major portions of the Patient Protection and Affordable Care Act. In December 2017, Higgins voted with other Republicans in favor of the Tax Cuts and Jobs Act.

During a House Homeland Security Committee hearing on November 15, 2023, Higgins floated an unfounded conspiracy theory that violence during the January 6 United States Capitol attack were caused by FBI agents infiltrating the protests through "ghost buses" and posing as Trump supporters.

As of the 117th Congress, Higgins voted with President Joe Biden's stated position 2% of the time according to a FiveThirtyEight analysis.

Higgins was among 71 Republicans who voted against final passage of the Fiscal Responsibility Act of 2023 in the House.

On July 29, 2024, Higgins was announced as one of seven Republican members of a bipartisan task force investigating the attempted assassination of Donald Trump in Pennsylvania.

=== Committee assignments ===
For the 118th Congress:

- Committee on Homeland Security
  - Subcommittee on Border Security and Enforcement (Chair)
  - Subcommittee on Emergency Management and Technology
- Committee on Oversight and Accountability
  - Subcommittee on National Security, the Border, and Foreign Affairs
  - Subcommittee on Government Operations and the Federal Workforce

=== Caucus memberships ===
- Republican Study Committee
- Freedom Caucus
- Congressional Western Caucus

== Political positions ==
=== Abortion ===
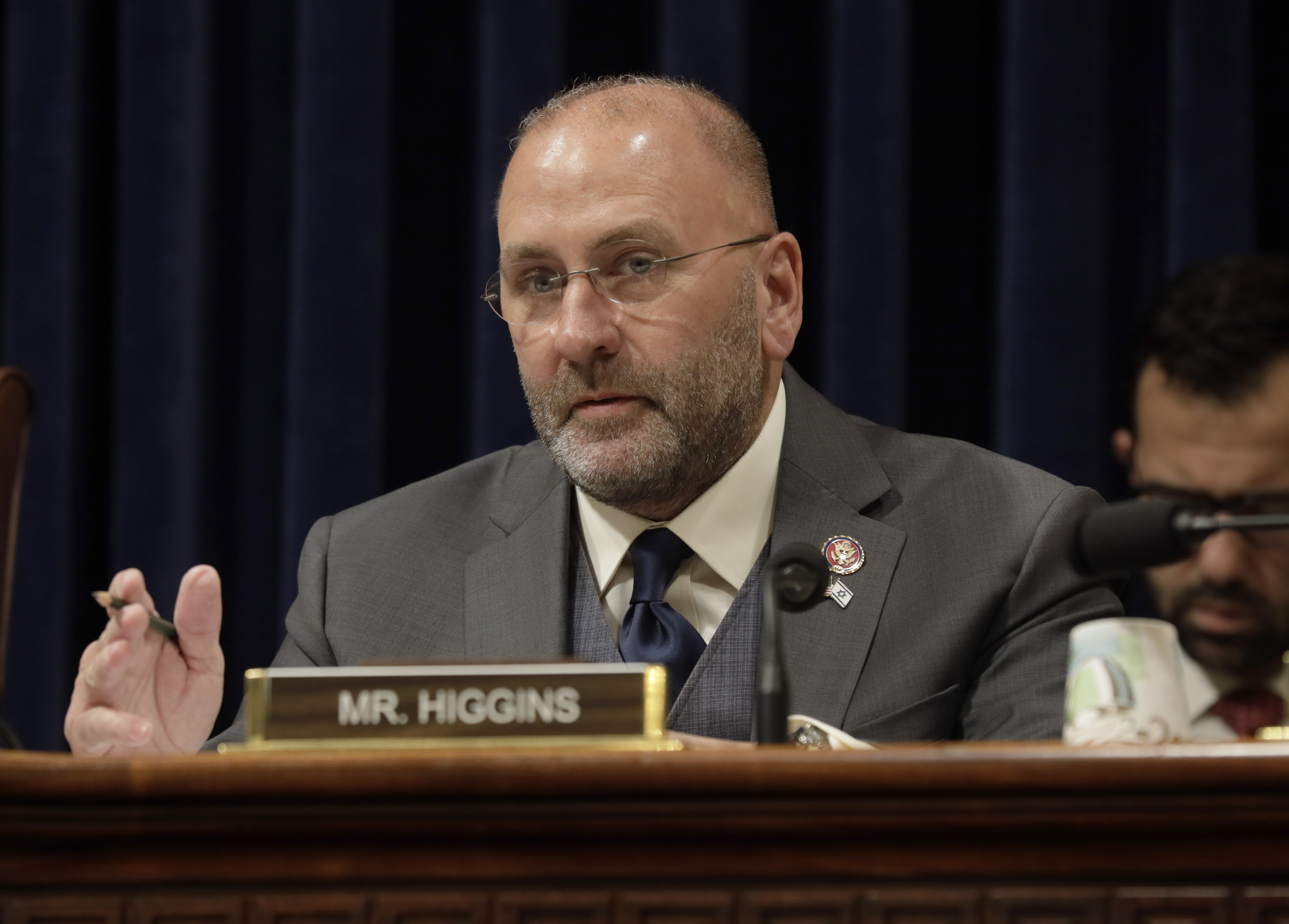
Higgins speaking to the Committee on Homeland Security in 2019.

Higgins is anti-abortion and has compared abortion to the Holocaust.

=== COVID-19 ===
During the COVID-19 pandemic, Higgins was an outspoken skeptic, and asserted that the Chinese Communist Party had created the disease as part of a biological warfare campaign.

In a May 2020 CNN interview, Higgins described face masks as a "bacteria trap" and said they did not help to slow the spread of COVID-19, noting that he did not believe they were effective as smells are able to pass through them.

In May 2021, Higgins wrote on Facebook, "I do not support mandatory vaccines, mask mandates or any form of required vaccine passport." In July 2021, he introduced a bill that would make it illegal for employers to mandate vaccination for their employees.

In the same month, Higgins confirmed that he and his wife had both contracted COVID-19 in January 2020, and that they had since contracted it a second time, along with their son. He has not publicly revealed his vaccination status.

=== Environment ===
In December 2024, Higgins sponsored a HR 10549 which would abolish the Environmental Protection Agency.

=== Freedom of speech ===
Higgins has consistently claimed to be a defender of free expression and the First Amendment. In 2023, he co-sponsored House Resolution 140 (Protecting Speech from Government Interference Act), stating in a press release that "no single organization, including the federal government, should determine what constitutes as an acceptable form of speech".

In September 2025, three days after the assassination of right-wing political activist Charlie Kirk, Higgins detailed in a post on X his plans to use federal authority in retaliation against Americans who, in his judgment, had expressed opinions which "belittled" the event, including lobbying social media platforms to permanently ban them from access for life. Higgins also claimed he would seek to revoke the driving privileges, debank, and expel from school anyone he views as celebrating the death of Kirk.

=== Gun rights ===
Higgins supports gun rights and opposes the regulation of firearms. In 2017, he said, "The modern hysteria over guns is another example of our weakened society. Guns weren't really regulated at all prior to the '60s in America. Throughout our history, prior to just 50 years ago, a child could purchase a gun from any seller, if Daddy sent him with the money."

Higgins has endorsed the use of firearms for political confrontation. He has appeared at rallies hosted by the Oath Keepers and publicly praised the Three Percenters, militia groups that advocate violent action against the United States government.

=== Immigration ===
In July 2018, House Democrats called for a floor vote on abolishing U.S. Immigration and Customs Enforcement (ICE). House Republicans refused and called for the House to vote on a resolution by Higgins and Kevin McCarthy to support ICE.

=== Islam ===
In June 2017, following the London Bridge terror attack, Higgins wrote on Facebook: "The free world... all of Christendom... is at war with Islamic horror. Not one penny of American treasure should be granted to any nation who harbors these heathen animals. Not a single radicalized Islamic suspect should be granted any measure of quarter. Their intended entry to the American homeland should be summarily denied. Every conceivable measure should be engaged to hunt them down. Hunt them, identity [sic] them, and kill them. Kill them all. For the sake of all that is good and righteous. Kill them all."

=== LGBTQ rights ===
Higgins opposes same-sex marriage. He believes states should have the right to ban same-sex marriage and voted against the Respect for Marriage Act that codifies parts of Obergefell v. Hodges.

=== National security ===
Higgins supported Trump's 2017 Executive Order 13679 to temporarily curtail travel from certain Muslim majority countries, saying, "The president's executive order for a short-term restriction on visa entries from seven countries that are known to foster terrorists, combined with a systematic review of our immigration and vetting procedure, is reasonable."

Higgins has promoted himself and spoken at rallies by anti-government militia groups.

On February 28, 2022, in response to the Russian invasion of Ukraine, Higgins tweeted, "You millennial leftists who never lived one day under nuclear threat can now reflect upon your woke sky. You made quite a non-binary fuss to save the world from intercontinental ballistic tweets", the meaning of which became a subject of minor debate.

=== Texas v. Pennsylvania ===
In December 2020, Higgins was one of 126 Republican members of the House of Representatives to sign an amicus brief in support of Texas v. Pennsylvania, a lawsuit filed at the United States Supreme Court contesting the results of the 2020 presidential election, in which Joe Biden defeated incumbent Donald Trump. The Supreme Court declined to hear the case on the basis that Texas lacked standing under Article III of the Constitution to challenge the results of an election held by another state.

=== Russia ===
On March 19, 2024, Higgins voted against House Resolution 149 condemning the illegal abduction and forcible transfer of children from Ukraine to the Russian Federation. He was one of nine Republicans to do so.

Higgins has introduced legislation to prohibit the transfer of Army Tactical Missile Systems (ATACMS) to Ukraine.

=== Epstein files ===
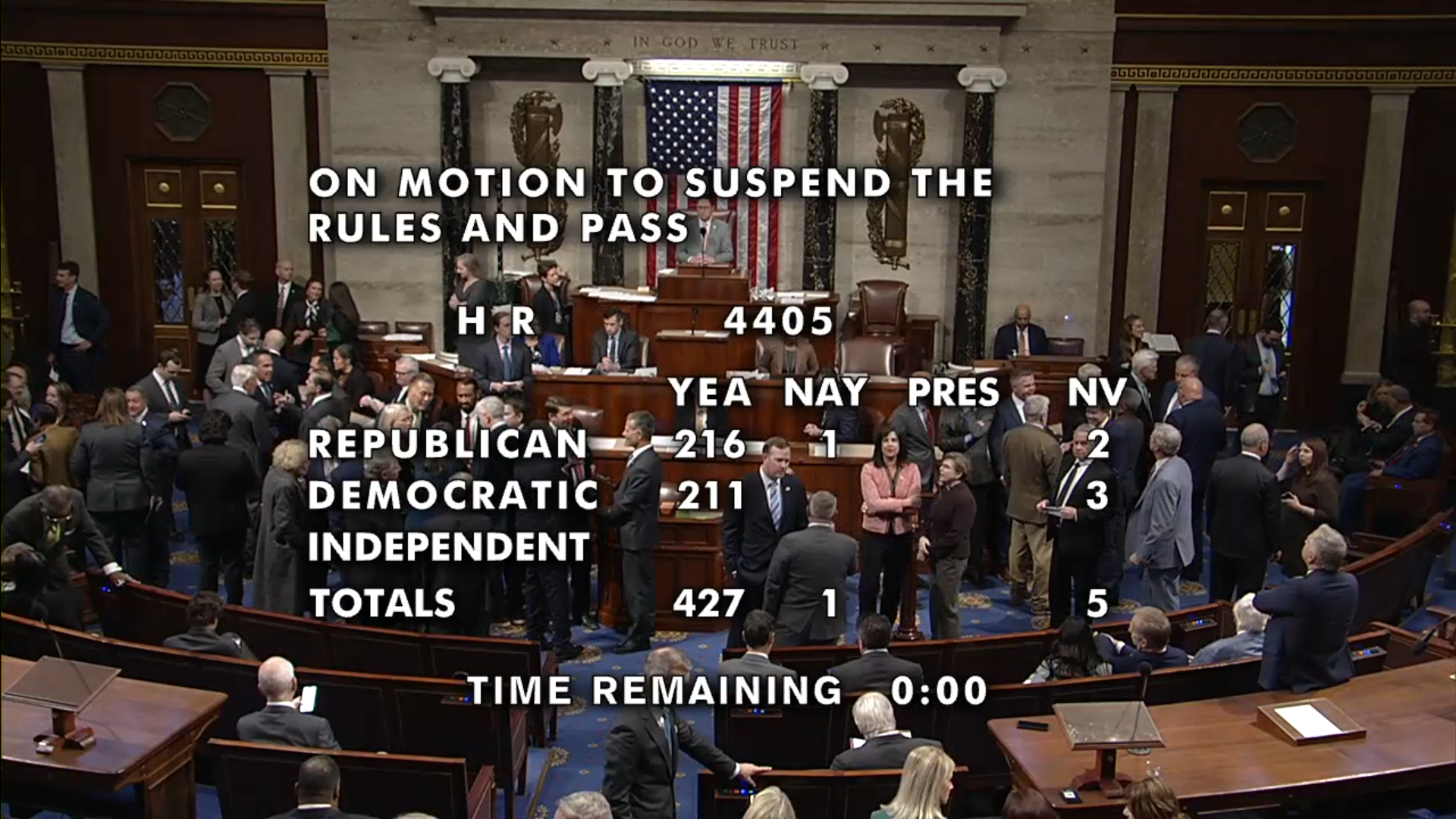
The House of Representatives voting 427–1 to approve the Epstein Files Transparency Act. Higgins was the sole representative to vote against it.

On November 18, 2025, Higgins was the sole member of Congress to vote against the Epstein Files Transparency Act, a bill compelling the U.S. Department of Justice to release all files related to convicted sex offender Jeffrey Epstein. Higgins posted on X that the bill "abandons 250 years of criminal justice procedure in America" and "reveals and injures thousands of innocent people – witnesses, people who provided alibis, family members, etc." and argued that "this type of broad reveal of criminal investigative files, released to a rabid media, will absolutely result in innocent people being hurt."

== Personal life ==
Higgins has been married four times. Higgins first married Eloisa Rovati. They had a daughter together, who died a few months after she was born. Higgins and Rovati later divorced. Rovati alleged that Higgins held a gun to her head and threatened to shoot her during an argument, a claim Higgins has repeatedly denied. Higgins then married Rosemary "Stormy" Rothkamm-Hambrice. He adopted her child from a previous marriage, and they had two more children together. They divorced in 1999. Higgins's third wife was Kara Seymour. They also divorced. Higgins lives in Port Barre, Louisiana, with his fourth wife, Becca.

Rothkamm-Hambrice, then living in Mississippi, filed suit against him the day after the 2016 election for unpaid child support of more than $140,000, including interest on overdue payments. Higgins said that he sought reduced payments in 2005 after changing careers to law enforcement, but the issue was never settled. The Daily Advertiser reported: "Calls about the case made by this newspaper in September, first to the Texas Attorney General's Office, then to Louisiana courts, brought similar responses from both places: Clay Higgins was not in trouble with the courts in either state over the child support payments."

Higgins is a Protestant.

U.S. House of Representatives
Preceded by Charles Boustany	Member of the U.S. House of Representatives from Louisiana's 3rd congressional district 2017–present	Incumbent
U.S. order of precedence (ceremonial)
Preceded by Josh Gottheimer	United States representatives by seniority 167th	Succeeded by Pramila Jayapal
