= Scott Angelle =

American politician

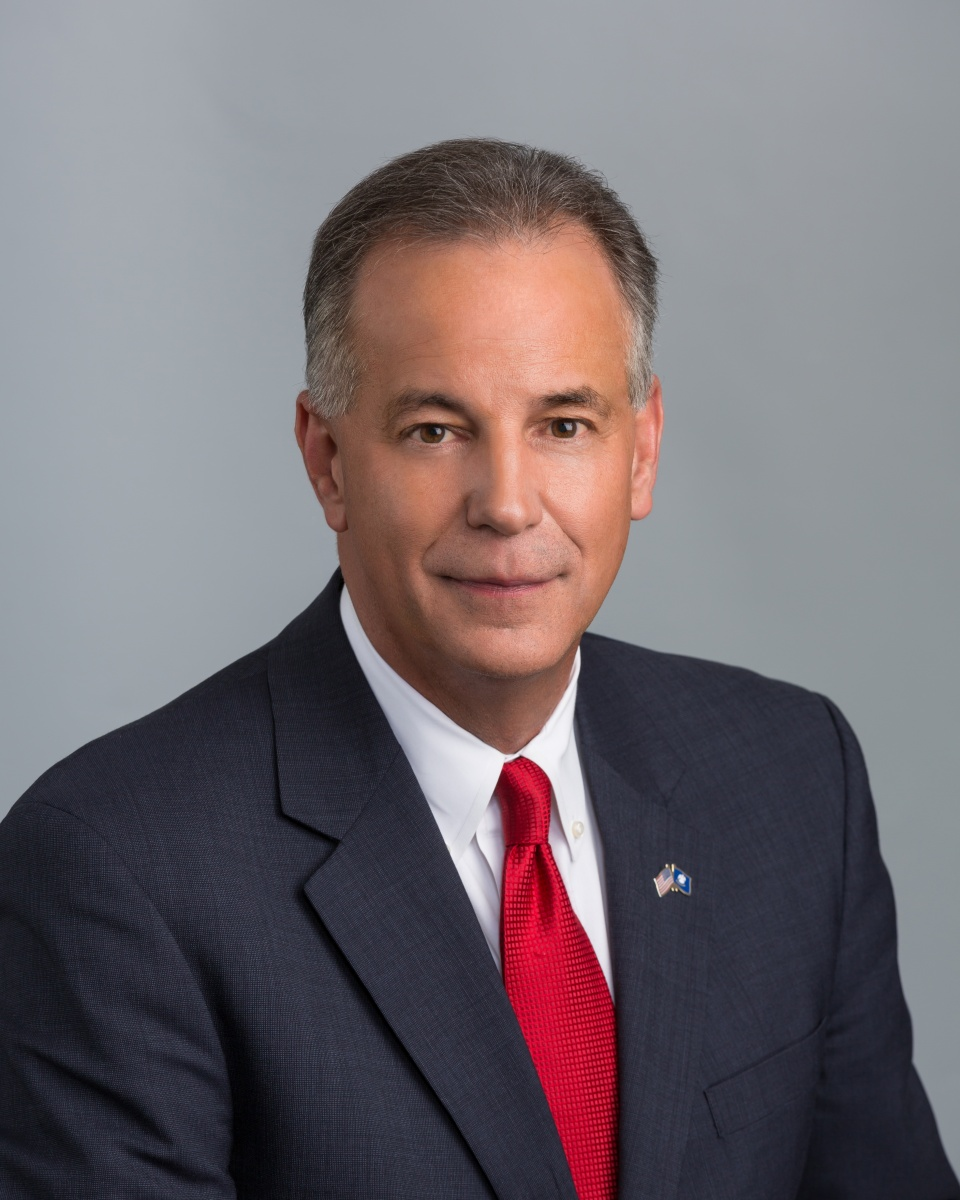
- Official portrait, 2017

Director of the Bureau of Safety and Environmental Enforcement
- In office May 24, 2017 – January 20, 2021
- President: Donald Trump
- Preceded by: Brian Salerno
- Succeeded by: Kevin M. Sligh

Member of the Louisiana Public Service Commission from the 2nd district
- In office January 1, 2013 – May 22, 2017
- Preceded by: Jimmy Field
- Succeeded by: Damon Baldone

52nd Lieutenant Governor of Louisiana
- In office May 12, 2010 – November 22, 2010
- Governor: Bobby Jindal
- Preceded by: Mitch Landrieu
- Succeeded by: Jay Dardenne

Louisiana Secretary of Natural Resources
- In office January 30, 2004 – August 8, 2012
- Governor: Kathleen Blanco; Bobby Jindal
- Preceded by: Jack Caldwell
- Succeeded by: Stephen Chustz

Personal details
- Born: Scott Anthony Angelle; November 20, 1961 (age 64) Breaux Bridge, Louisiana, U.S.
- Party: Democratic (before 2010); Republican (2010–present)
- Spouse: Dianne Bourque
- Education: University of Louisiana at Lafayette (BS)

Scott Anthony Angelle (born November 20, 1961) is an American politician who served as the former director of the Bureau of Safety and Environmental Enforcement in Washington, D.C. From 2013 to 2017, he was the District 2 member of the Louisiana Public Service Commission, an elected five-person utility regulatory body.

In 2010, Angelle served six months as lieutenant governor. In 2015, he ran for governor as a Republican in the October 24 election and finished in third place with 214,907 votes (19.3 percent).

In 2016, Angelle was an unsuccessful candidate for Louisiana's 3rd congressional district seat held by Charles Boustany, who instead ran unsuccessfully for the United States Senate seat vacated by retiring Republican David Vitter. Angelle's opponents included Lafayette businessman and retired Army Lt. Colonel Greg Ellison, former state Representative Brett Geymann of Lake Charles, former United States Ambassador to East Timor Grover J. Rees III, and, the eventual winner, Clay Higgins, a former spokesperson for the St. Landry Parish Sheriff's Office who gained attention for his Crime Stoppers videos that harshly attack the criminal element.

In May 2017, Angelle was appointed as the fourth director for the Bureau of Safety and Environmental Enforcement in the United States Department of the Interior under Secretary Ryan Zinke. The post does not require confirmation by the United States Senate.

== Education ==
Angelle is an honor graduate of the St. Martin Parish public schools. He holds a Bachelor of Science in Petroleum Land Management and is a cum laude graduate of the University of Louisiana at Lafayette.

== Political career ==
=== Early political career ===
Angelle was elected at the age of twenty-five to the St. Martin Parish Police Jury, the local governing body known as the county commission in most other states. From 2000 to 2004, Angelle served as the first parish president of St. Martin Parish after the parish adopted a home rule charter. Earlier, he worked as a petroleum land manager in Lafayette.

=== Department of Natural Resources ===
From 2004 to 2012, with the exception of his six months as lieutenant governor, Angelle was the secretary of the Louisiana Department of Natural Resources under Governors Kathleen Blanco and then Bobby Jindal. He replaced Jack Caldwell. Angelle resigned on August 8, 2012, and he was replaced by Stephen Chustz. As Angelle resigned from the Natural Resources position, Jindal nominated him to represent Louisiana's 3rd congressional district on the Board of Supervisors of Louisiana State University in Baton Rouge.

=== Lieutenant governor ===
As part of the interim appointment as lieutenant governor, Angelle agreed not to seek the position in the special election held in November 2010. The vacancy occurred when Mitch Landrieu resigned to become the mayor of New Orleans. Angelle was a Democrat until he switched to the Republican affiliation on October 26, 2010. Both parties had attempted to recruit Angelle to run for Louisiana's 3rd congressional district in the 2010 elections to succeed Democrat Charlie Melancon, who ran instead for the U. S. Senate in 2010 against Republican David Vitter, whom Angelle also opposed in the 2015 gubernatorial race. Earlier, Angelle had declined the overtures from both parties to run for Congress.

Angelle officially began the duties of lieutenant governor on May 17, 2010. He temporarily relinquished the job of secretary of the Department of Natural Resources to Robert Harper but continued to serve as the governor's lobbyist to the legislature. Angelle returned to his position in Natural Resources after his time as lieutenant governor ended.

=== Moratorium Rally ===
On July 21, 2010, Angelle led a rally of over 12,000 citizens in Lafayette's Cajundome demanding the federal government to "Lift the Moratorium Now!" President Barack Obama had imposed the 2010 United States deepwater drilling moratorium in the Gulf of Mexico after the Deepwater Horizon oil spill. There, Angelle notably said, "This moratorium is not hurting the stock holders of BP, or Exxon or Chevron; this moratorium is hurting the Cheramies, and the Calais, and the Dupuis, and the Robins and the Boudreauxs, and the Thibodeauxs," referring to the negative effect on the local economy that the moratorium may have. The moratorium was lifted in October 2010, a move considered a pivotal point in Angelle's political career.

=== Sinkhole controversy ===
On August 3, 2012, it was discovered that the Bayou Corne sinkhole in Assumption Parish, Louisiana was the result of a collapsed salt dome operated by the Texas Brine Company. This collapse allowed oil and gases to escape and surface. Angelle has received criticism for leaving his Department of Natural Resources position five days after the disaster began, however, it was later discovered that the sinkhole was due to months of seismic activity that The Texas Brine Company ignored. As of October 2014, the sinkhole is still ongoing while local residents continue a legal battle with the Texas Brine Company. On September 25, 2015, Assumption Parish President, Martin Triche, stated "To suggest that Scott Angelle abandoned Bayou Corne and Assumption Parish is nothing short of completely false. Senator Vitter was not there for our residents when Scott was." Ryan Cross, Angelle's gubernatorial campaign manager said, "Scott had already made the decision he was going to run for PSC. He jumpstarted the response and coordinated it on the ground. He was one of the first people down at the sinkhole site."

=== Public Service Commissioner ===
In the 2012 PSC race, Angelle, with 213,485 votes (57.2 percent), won all thirteen parishes in District 2 to claim the seat vacated by Jimmy Field, a Baton Rouge attorney. The Democrat Forest Wright finished second in the balloting with 76,336 votes (20.5 percent), and Republican state representative Erich Ponti of Baton Rouge, trailed in third place with 43,287 ballots (11.6 percent). Two other contenders, a Republican and a No Party contender, shared the remaining 11 percent of the vote.

=== 2015 gubernatorial campaign ===
Angelle lost by a relatively narrow margin in the primary to his fellow Republican, U.S. Senator David Vitter, who took on Democrat John Bel Edwards of Tangipahoa Parish in the November 21 general election. Another of Angelle's opponents in the governor's race was his elected successor as lieutenant governor, Jay Dardenne of Baton Rouge, who finished fourth in the primary. Dardenne endorsed Edwards for the November 21 runoff election against Vitter, but Angelle refused to endorse either candidate. State Treasurer John Neely Kennedy, himself a former Democrat, called upon Angelle to join him in endorsing Vitter to prove Angelle's credibility as a Republican. Angelle responded via spokesman, criticizing Kennedy's political history and calling him "the eternal president of the RINO club."

=== 2016 congressional campaign ===
On March 3, 2016, Angelle announced his candidacy for Louisiana's 3rd congressional district, which is being vacated by Charles Boustany. Angelle polled 44 percent in the runoff contest against former St. Landry Parish sheriff's deputy Clay Higgins, having run best in the Lake Charles area.

=== Bureau of Safety and Environmental Enforcement ===
On May 23, 2017, the United States Secretary of the Interior, Ryan Zinke, made Angelle the Bureau of Safety and Environmental Enforcement's fourth Director. That year, the Gulf of Mexico produced $2.8 billion in lease and royalty payments to the federal government. Angelle has frequently traveled to Texas and Louisiana to meet with industry executives and has encouraged them to directly call his cellphone to avoid disclosure in public records requests. Angelle's rule changes are forecast to save the oil and gas industry over $1.3 billion in regulatory compliance costs over the next decade.

In 2017, the Interior Department withdrew its sole liability bonding requirement on rig owners, which had required offshore drillers to post guarantees that they would pay for the ultimate removal of their rigs. The change was lobbied for by Trent Lott and John Breaux, and will save the industry hundreds of millions of dollars. Drillers have posted $2.9 billion of the estimated $40 billion in removal costs. In July 2017, the Interior Department reduced the royalty rates drillers must pay the government to drill on the Gulf's Outer Continental Shelf from 18.75% to 12.5%.

In June 2017, Angelle doubled the time drillers are given to remove unproductive or damaged platforms. In October 2017, the Bureau responded to a 672,000 gallon oil leak from a pipeline fracture southeast of Venice, Louisiana in the largest accident since the Deepwater Horizon oil spill.

In December 2017, Angelle reduced maintenance requirements on offshore platforms. That month, Angelle proposed to relax the well-control rule, which had been implemented in response to the Deepwater Horizon explosion. Angelle's proposal would reduce blowout preventer inspection requirements, allow operations to continue while liftboats approach, and would save the industry $986 million in the next decade.

== Personal life ==
Angelle and his wife have three daughters and two sons.

Angelle served on Sunoco Logistics's board of directors for four years, for which he was paid $1 million.

== Electoral history ==
Year	Office / Election	Candidate	Party	Votes	%	Result
2015	Governor of Louisiana (primary)	John Bel Edwards	Democratic	444,061	39.9	Advanced to runoff
2015	Governor of Louisiana (primary)	David Vitter	Republican	256,105	23.0	Advanced to runoff
2015	Governor of Louisiana (primary)	Scott Angelle	Republican	214,907	19.3	Eliminated
2015	Governor of Louisiana (primary)	Jay Dardenne	Republican	166,553	15.0	Eliminated
Total votes: 1,113,476
2015	Governor of Louisiana (runoff)	John Bel Edwards	Democratic	646,860	56.1	Elected
2015	Governor of Louisiana (runoff)	David Vitter	Republican	505,929	43.9	Defeated
Total votes: 1,152,789
2016	U.S. House (LA-03 primary)	Scott Angelle	Republican	91,532	28.6	Advanced to runoff
2016	U.S. House (LA-03 primary)	Clay Higgins	Republican	84,912	26.5	Advanced to runoff
2016	U.S. House (LA-03 primary)	Other candidates	—	—	remainder	Eliminated
Total votes: 320,454
2016	U.S. House (LA-03 general)	Clay Higgins	Republican	77,671	56.1	Elected
2016	U.S. House (LA-03 general)	Scott Angelle	Republican	60,762	43.9	Defeated
Total votes: 138,433

== See also ==
- List of American politicians who switched parties in office

Political offices
Preceded by Mitch Landrieu	Lieutenant Governor of Louisiana; 2010	Succeeded by Jay Dardenne
Preceded by Jimmy Field	Member of the Louisiana Public Service Commission for the 2nd district 2013–2017	Succeeded by Damon Baldone
