= Brett Geymann =

American politician

Member of the Louisiana House of Representatives from the 35th district
- Incumbent
- Assumed office January 19, 2021
- Preceded by: Stephen Dwight
- In office January 12, 2004 – January 11, 2016
- Preceded by: Vic Stelly
- Succeeded by: Stephen Dwight

Personal details
- Party: Republican
- Education: McNeese State University (BS)

Brett F. Geymann is an American politician serving as a member of the Louisiana House of Representatives from the 35th district.

== Political career ==
Geymann first served in the Louisiana House from 2004 to 2016, after which he was term-limited. He returned to office in 2021 after the resignation of Stephen Dwight.

=== Legislative Actions ===
Geymann has introduced measures to reform state budget practices and addressing local issues such as escaped crawfish from cultivation ponds. His legislative record includes strong stances on abortion, education, and business-related policies.

Other bills supported by Geymann focus on fiscal responsibility, conservative policies, wildlife management and state budget practices.

== Political positions ==
Geymann has been a vocal opponent of the Common Core State Standards Initiative.

== Election history ==
Geymann's political career includes a failed bid for Louisiana's 3rd congressional district in 2016 and an unsuccessful attempt for a state Senate seat in 2019. Geymann currently serves in the Louisiana House of Representatives.
