= Charles Boustany =

American politician (born 1956)

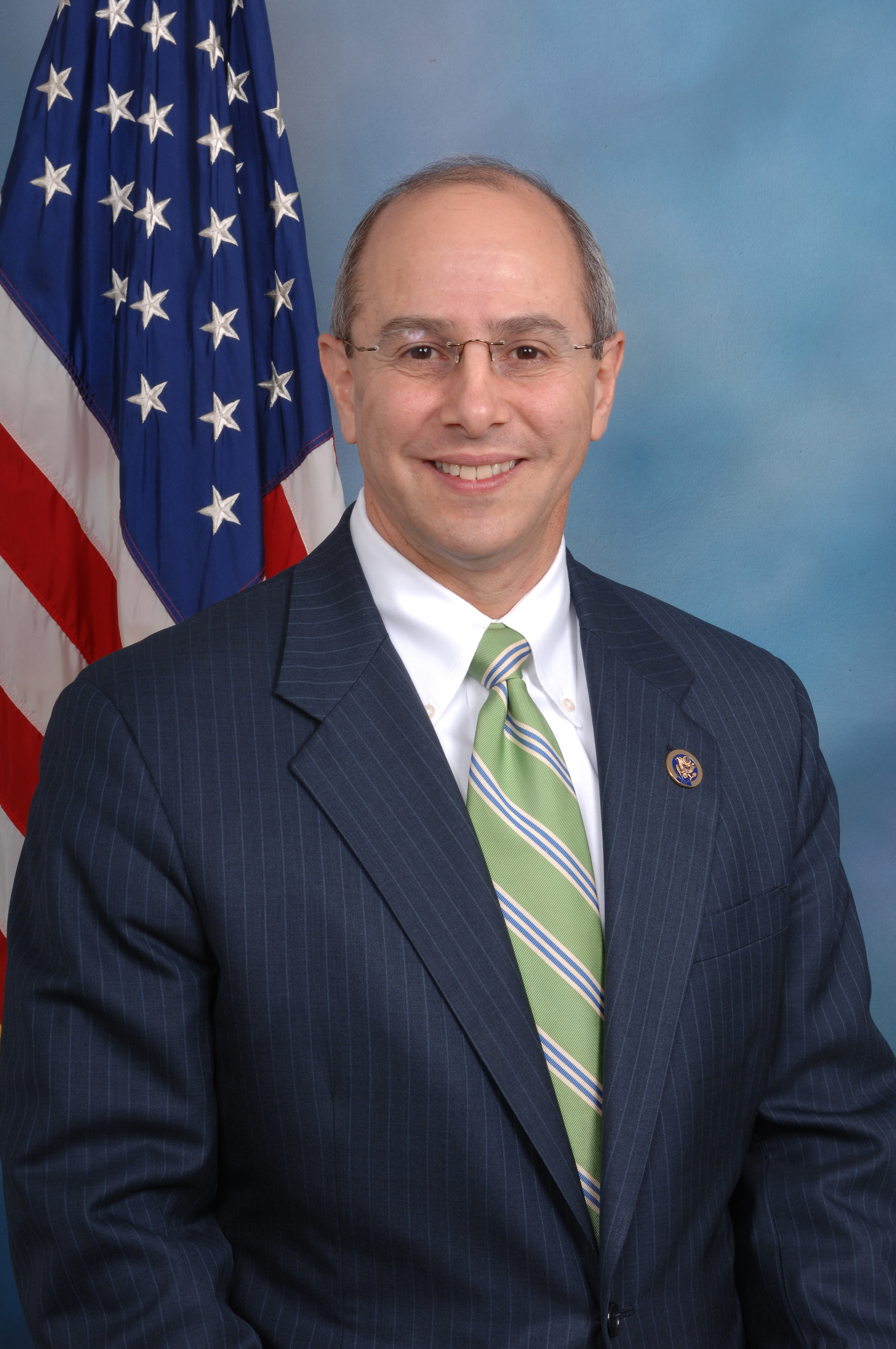

Member of the U.S. House of Representatives from Louisiana
- In office January 3, 2005 – January 3, 2017
- Preceded by: Chris John
- Succeeded by: Clay Higgins
- Constituency: 7th district (2005–2013); 3rd district (2013–2017)

Personal details
- Born: Charles William Boustany Jr. February 21, 1956 (age 70) Lafayette, Louisiana, U.S.
- Party: Republican
- Spouse: Bridget Edwards
- Children: 2
- Education: University of Louisiana, Lafayette (BS); Louisiana State University, New Orleans (MD)

Charles William Boustany Jr. (/bʊˈstæni/; born February 21, 1956) is an American politician, physician, and former congressman from Lafayette, Louisiana, who served as the U.S. representative from Louisiana's 3rd congressional district from 2005 to 2017 (numbered as the 7th district from 2005 to 2013). He is a member of the Republican Party.

Boustany stepped down from the U.S. House in January 2017; he was a candidate for the United States Senate in 2016 in a bid to succeed the retiring Republican David Vitter. Boustany did not advance beyond the primary election, finishing third in the jungle primary behind Republican John Neely Kennedy and Democrat Foster Campbell. He was succeeded in the House of Representatives by Clay Higgins, a Republican who is a Lafayette law enforcement officer residing outside the district in St. Landry Parish. Since leaving Congress, he has worked as a lobbyist. He endorsed Kamala Harris in the 2024 United States presidential election.

== Early life, education, and medical career ==
Boustany was born in Lafayette, Louisiana, the son of Madlyn M. (née Ackal) and Charles W. Boustany Sr. (1930–2009); his paternal grandparents, Alfred Frem Boustany and Florida (née Saloom), were immigrants from Lebanon. His maternal grandparents were also Lebanese.

In 2006, he was one of four Middle Eastern American members of Congress.

The senior Boustany, a Democrat, served for sixteen years as coroner of Lafayette Parish. Congressman Boustany has nine siblings: James, Jon, Ron, Stella (Dr. Stella B. Noel), Therese (Mrs. Reggie), Kathryn (Mrs. Scurlock), Madlyn (Mrs. Juneau), Adele (Mrs. Weber), and Cheryn (Mrs. Eppley). He is a cousin of Victoria Reggie Kennedy, widow of U.S. Senator Edward M. Kennedy of Massachusetts.

Boustany attended the University of Louisiana at Lafayette, at which he was a member of Kappa Alpha Order fraternity. He earned his medical degree from Louisiana State University Health Sciences Center New Orleans in 1978. He is a retired cardiovascular surgeon who completed his residency in Rochester, New York before returning to Louisiana to take a job at Charity Hospital, New Orleans.

During Boustany's medical career, he was the defendant in at least three malpractice suits. In a 2000 case, Geraldine Arceneaux, was awarded $1.2 Million in damages from a state compensation fund. Prior to filing the lawsuit, filed a complaint with the state's Medical Review Panel, which found his conduct to be "below the acceptable standard of care." In 1992, Melanie Malagarie filed a malpractice suit which resulted in an award of $600,000 in damages. In 1995, Delila Hays filed a medical malpractice suit which resulted in an unspecified settlement.

== U.S. House of Representatives ==
=== Elections ===
==== 2004 ====
In 2004, incumbent Democratic U.S. Congressman Chris John of Louisiana's 7th congressional district decided to retire in order to run for the U.S. Senate. John had held the district for eight years without serious difficulty, even though it had been trending increasingly Republican at the national level. Boustany jumped into the race with another Republican, the late David Thibodaux of Lafayette, Democratic state senator Willie Mount of Lake Charles and Democratic state representative Don Cravins Jr. of Opelousas. In the open primary election, Boustany ranked first with 39 percent, with Mount garnering 25 percent for second place. Under Louisiana's nonpartisan blanket primary system, in the event no candidate wins a "50 percent plus one vote" total, a runoff is conducted between the two top candidates, regardless of party.

Vice President Dick Cheney campaigned on behalf of Boustany. In the December 4 run-off election, Boustany defeated Mount 55–45 percent. He was only the second Republican to represent the district, the first having been Jimmy Hayes, who switched from Democratic affiliation in 1995.

==== 2006 ====
Boustany won re-election to a second term with 71 percent of the vote, defeating Democrat Mike Stagg.

==== 2008 ====
Boustany won re-election to a third term defeating Democrat Don Cravins, Jr. and Constitution Party candidate Peter Vidrine.

==== 2010 ====
Boustany won re-election to a fourth term unopposed.

==== 2012 ====
After Louisiana lost a district in redistricting, most of Boustany's territory became the 3rd District. He faced freshman fellow Republican and 3rd District incumbent Jeff Landry of New Iberia. Although the district retained Landry's district number, it was geographically and demographically more Boustany's district. Indeed, the new 3rd contained almost two-thirds of Boustany's former territory, while Landry retained only the western third of his former district. Landry led Boustany in third-quarter 2011 fundraising, $251,000 to $218,000. According to Federal Election Commission, Boustany led in cash-on-hand lead, $1.1 million – $402,000. In addition to Boustany and Landry, a third Republican, state Representative Chris Leopold of Plaquemines Parish, announced via Facebook his candidacy for the seat, but he never filed the paperwork.

The Boustany-Landry race attracted most of the political attention in Louisiana in 2012, as it was seen as pitting an establishment Republican against a candidate identifying with the Tea Party. Though most politicians shunned involvement in the heated race, Louisiana Commissioner of Agriculture and Forestry Michael G. Strain endorsed Boustany, whom he described as particularly helpful to the agricultural sector while serving as a U.S. representative. Landry, meanwhile, carried the backing of most of the Republican parish executive committees in the district. Landry also was endorsed by Phyllis Schlafly's Eagle Forum political action committee.

In the November 6 election, technically a nonpartisan blanket primary for Congress, Boustany led Landry by 45,596 votes. In a five-candidate field, Boustany received 139,123 votes (45 percent); Landry received 93,527 votes (30 percent). Democrat Ron Richard procured the critical 67,070 votes (22 percent). The remaining 7,908 votes (2 percent) and 3,765 ballots (1 percent) were cast, respectively, for Republican Bryan Barrilleaux and the Libertarian Jim Stark. Because no candidate received a majority, Boustany and Landry met in a runoff contest held on December 8.

Boustany won the runoff election against Landry with 58,820 votes (61 percent). He had large margins in seven of the ten parishes in the district, particularly in Acadia, Calcasieu, and Lafayette but lost the three parishes that Landry represents, St. Martin, Iberia, and St. Mary.

=== Tenure ===
Boustany presented the Republican response to President Barack H. Obama's joint address to Congress on Wednesday September 9, 2009. He was the sponsor of H.R. 1173, the Fiscal Responsibility and Retirement Security Act of 2011. The bill would repeal title VIII of the Patient Protection and Affordable Care Act which established a voluntary long-term care insurance program. It passed the house 267–159 on February 1, 2012 but was never passed by the Senate.

In 2013, Boustany was a sponsor of the United States farm bill, which was rejected 234–195 in votes, with sixty-two Republicans voting against.

=== Committee assignments ===
- Committee on Ways and Means
  - Subcommittee on Oversight (Chair)
  - Subcommittee on Human Resources
  - Subcommittee on Select Revenue Measures

== 2016 U.S. Senate campaign ==
Boustany ran for the open U.S. Senate seat held by retiring Republican David Vitter, and on election day he received 15.4 percent of the vote at third place, not enough to advance to the run-off.

== Personal life ==
Boustany's wife Bridget Edwards is a daughter of the late Acadia Parish assistant district attorney Nolan Edwards (1930–1983) of Crowley and Eleanor Merrill of Longboat Key, Florida. Nolan Edwards was shot to death in his law office by a disgruntled client. Bridget Boustany is hence a paternal niece of Democratic former Governor Edwin Washington Edwards.

The Boustanys have two children, Erik and Ashley. His cousin, Jerry Ramsey, and her husband Bo were among those wounded in the 2015 Lafayette shooting, in which two people were killed and nine others injured.

In 1995, Boustany filed a lawsuit in Louisiana's 15th Judicial District against two men in Britain for defrauding him in a $50,000 investment and in the $18,500 purchase of a title after they failed to deliver a purchased British Lordship.

He is an Episcopalian.

=== Murder in the Bayou controversy ===
"Murder in the Bayou: Who Killed the Women Known as the Jeff Davis 8?", a book investigating the 2005-2008 murders of eight sex workers in Jefferson Davis Parish, was released in September 2016. Using anonymous sources, author Ethan Brown alleged that Boustany patronized three of the eight victims at a motel owned by a Boustany field staffer, Martin Guillory. Murder in the Bayou was released while Boustany was running for U.S. Senate, and the story attracted widespread attention and drew comment from other candidates in the race. His wife claimed that the allegations were designed to damage his senate run, while Boustany himself criticized frontrunner John N. Kennedy for "fanning" the story. Boustany sued Brown and the publisher of Murder in the Bayou, Simon & Schuster, for defamation in October 2016. He dropped the lawsuit that December, after Kennedy was elected Senator.

== See also ==
- Physicians in the United States Congress
- List of Arab and Middle-Eastern Americans in the United States Congress

U.S. House of Representatives
Preceded by Chris John	Member of the U.S. House of Representatives from Louisiana's 7th congressional district 2005–2013	Constituency abolished
Preceded by Jeff Landry	Member of the U.S. House of Representatives from Louisiana's 3rd congressional district 2013–2017	Succeeded by Clay Higgins
U.S. order of precedence (ceremonial)
Preceded by Henson Moore as Former U.S. Representative	Order of precedence of the United States as Former U.S. Representative	Succeeded by Timothy Roemer as Former U.S. Representative
