= List of members of the Blue Dog Coalition =

Blue Dog Coalition in the 119th United States Congress

This is a list of members of the Blue Dog Coalition.

== Members in the 120th Congress ==
- JoAnna Mendoza (AZ-06)
- Adam Gray (CA-13)
- Jim Costa (CA-21)
- Lou Correa (CA-46)
- Eileen Laubacher (CO-04)
- Sanford Bishop (GA-02)
- Zach Dembo (KY-06)
- Jake Johnson (MN-01)
- Sam Forstag (MT-01)
- Jamie Ager (NC-11)
- Paul Barringer (NC-13)
- Zack Mullock (NJ-02)
- Josh Gottheimer (NJ-05)
- Bob Brooks (PA-07)
- Nancy Lacore (SC-01)
- Bobby Pulido (TX-15)
- Henry Cuellar (TX-28)
- Vicente Gonzalez (TX-34)
- Johnny Garcia (TX-35)
- Marie Gluesenkamp Perez (WA-03)
- Mitchell Berman (WI-01)
- Rebecca Cooke (WI-03)
- Kristen McDonald Rivet (MI-08)

== Outgoing members in the 119th Congress ==
1. Jared Golden (ME-02) - retired
2. Mike Thompson (CA-4) - defeated in 2026

== Former members ==
Section titles denote the final Congress a Blue Dog Coalition member served in.

=== 118th Congress ===
1. Mary Peltola (AK-AL) - defeated in 2024
2. Wiley Nickel (NC-13) - retired

=== 117th Congress ===
1. Carolyn Bourdeaux (GA-07) - lost re-nomination
2. Jim Cooper (TN-05) - retired
3. Charlie Crist (FL-13) - unsuccessfully ran for governor
4. Stephanie Murphy (FL-07) - retired
5. Tom O'Halleran (AZ-02) - defeated
6. Kurt Schrader (OR-05) - lost re-nomination

=== 116th Congress ===
1. Anthony Brindisi (NY-22) - defeated
2. Joe Cunningham (SC-01) - defeated
3. Kendra Horn (OK-05) - defeated
4. Dan Lipinski (IL-03) - lost re-nomination
5. Ben McAdams (UT-04) - defeated
6. Collin Peterson (MN-07) - defeated
7. Max Rose (NY-11) - defeated
8. Xochitl Torres Small (NM-02) - defeated

=== 115th Congress ===
After the 2018 House of Representatives elections, the caucus grew from 18 members to 24 members, registering an increment in membership of little more than 33%. All incumbents seeking re-election won their races.

=== 114th Congress ===
1. Brad Ashford (NE-02) - defeated
2. Gwen Graham (FL-02) - retired
3. Loretta Sanchez (CA-46) - unsuccessfully ran for Senate

=== 113th Congress ===
1. Ron Barber (AZ-02) - defeated
2. John Barrow (GA-12) - defeated
3. Pete Gallego (TX-23) - defeated
4. Jim Matheson (UT-04) - retired
5. Mike McIntyre (NC-07) - retired
6. Mike Michaud (ME-02) - unsuccessfully ran for governor
7. Nick Rahall (WV-03) - defeated

=== 112th Congress ===
- Jason Altmire (PA-04) - lost re-nomination
- Joe Baca (CA-43) - defeated
- Dan Boren (OK-02) - retired
- Tim Holden (PA-17) - lost re-nomination
- Larry Kissell (NC-08) - defeated
- Leonard Boswell (IA-03) - defeated
- Ben Chandler (KY-06) - defeated
- Mike Ross (AR-04) - retired
- Heath Shuler (NC-11) - retired
- Dennis Cardoza (CA-18) - resigned in 2012
- Gabrielle Giffords (AZ-08) - resigned in January 2012 after being injured in a 2011 assassination attempt
- Jane Harman (CA-36) - resigned in 2011

=== 111th Congress ===
- Robert Marion Berry (AR-01) – retired
- Brad Ellsworth (IN-08) - unsuccessfully ran for Senate
- Bart Gordon (TN-06) – retired
- Charlie Melancon (LA-03) – unsuccessfully ran for Senate
- Dennis Moore (KS-03) – retired
- John Tanner (TN-08) – retired
- Mike Arcuri (NY-24) - defeated
- Melissa Bean (IL-08) - defeated; re-elected in 2026 and joined the New Democrat Coalition
- Rick Boucher (VA-09) - defeated
- Allen Boyd (FL-02) - defeated
- Bobby Bright (AL-02) - defeated
- Chris Carney (PA-10) - defeated
- Travis Childers (MS-01) - defeated
- Kathy Dahlkemper (PA-03) - defeated
- Lincoln Davis (TN-04) - defeated
- Chet Edwards (TX-17) - defeated
- Bob Etheridge (NC-02) - defeated
- Stephanie Herseth Sandlin (SD-AL) - defeated
- Baron Hill (IN-09) - defeated
- Frank Kratovil (MD-01) - defeated
- Betsy Markey (CO-04) - defeated
- Jim Marshall (GA-08) - defeated
- Walt Minnick (ID-01) - defeated
- Harry Mitchell (AZ-05) - defeated
- Patrick Murphy (PA-08) - defeated
- Scott Murphy (NY-20) - defeated
- Glenn Nye (VA-02) - defeated
- Earl Pomeroy (ND-AL) - defeated
- John Salazar (CO-03) - defeated
- Ike Skelton (MO-04) - defeated
- Zack Space (OH-18) - defeated
- Gene Taylor (MS-04) - defeated
- Charlie Wilson (OH-06) - defeated
- Parker Griffith (AL-05) – changed party affiliations in December 2009

=== 110th Congress ===
- Don Cazayoux (LA-06) - defeated
- Bud Cramer (AL-05) - retired
- Nick Lampson (TX-22) - defeated
- Tim Mahoney (FL-16) - defeated

=== 109th Congress ===
- Harold Ford Jr. (TN-09) - unsuccessfully ran for Senate
- Ed Case (HI-02) - unsuccessfully ran for Senate

=== 108th Congress ===
- Brad Carson (OK-02) - unsuccessfully ran for Senate
- Chris John (LA-07) - unsuccessfully ran for Senate
- Nick Lampson (TX-09) - defeated following redistricting
- Bill Lipinski (IL-03) - retired
- Ken Lucas (KY-04) - retired
- Max Sandlin (TX-01) - defeated following redistricting
- Charlie Stenholm (TX-17) - defeated following redistricting
- Jim Turner (TX-02) - retired following redistricting

=== 107th Congress ===
- Gary Condit (CA-18) - lost re-nomination
- David D. Phelps (IL-19) - defeated following redistricting
- Ronnie Shows (MS-04) - defeated following redistricting

=== 106th Congress ===
- Owen Pickett (VA-02) - retired
- Pat Danner (MO-06) - retired
- David Minge (MN-02) - defeated

=== 105th Congress ===
- Scotty Baesler (KY-06) - unsuccessfully ran for Senate

=== 104th Congress ===
- Bill Orton (UT-03) - defeated
- Glen Browder (AL-03) - unsuccessfully ran for Senate
- Lewis F. Payne, Jr. (VA-05) - unsuccessfully ran for lieutenant governor of Virginia
- Pete Geren (TX-12) - retired
- Charlie Rose (NC-07) - retired
- Bill Brewster (OK-03) - retired

=== Other former members ===
==== Appointed or elected to other offices ====
- Joe Donnelly (IN-02) - elected to the Senate in 2012
- Kirsten Gillibrand (NY-20) - appointed to the Senate in 2009
- Blanche Lincoln (AR-01) - elected to the Senate in 1998
- Kyrsten Sinema (AZ-09) - elected to the Senate in 2018
- Ellen Tauscher (CA-10) - appointed under secretary of state for arms control and international security in 2009

==== Died in office ====
- Norman Sisisky (VA-04) - died in office in 2001

==== Left the Blue Dog Coalition ====
- Cheri Bustos (IL-17)
- Ed Case (HI-01)
- Steve Israel (NY-03)
- Adam Schiff (CA-29)
- Brad Schneider (IL-10)
- David Scott (GA-13)
- Mikie Sherrill (NJ-11)
- Abigail Spanberger (VA-07)
- Filemon Vela Jr. (TX-34)

==== Left the Democratic Party ====
- Rodney Alexander (LA-05) - became a Republican in 2004
- Nathan Deal (GA-09) - became a Republican in 1995
- Ralph Hall (TX-04) - became a Republican in 2004
- Jimmy Hayes (LA-07) - became a Republican in 1995
- Virgil Goode (VA-05) - became a Republican in 2002
- Parker Griffith (AL-05) - became a Republican in 2009
- Michael Parker (MS-04) - became a Republican in 1995
- Billy Tauzin (LA-03) - became a Republican in 1995
- Jeff Van Drew (NJ-02) - became a Republican in 2019
