= Chris John (politician) =

American politician (born 1960)

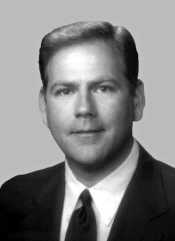

Member of the U.S. House of Representatives from Louisiana's 7th district
- In office January 3, 1997 – January 3, 2005
- Preceded by: Jimmy Hayes
- Succeeded by: Charles Boustany

Member of the Louisiana House of Representatives from the 42nd district
- In office 1988–1996
- Preceded by: Donald Thibodeaux
- Succeeded by: Gil Pinac

Personal details
- Born: Christopher Charles John; January 5, 1960 (age 66) Crowley, Louisiana, U.S.
- Party: Democratic
- Spouse: Payton Smith
- Relatives: John Smith (father-in-law)
- Education: Louisiana State University, Baton Rouge (BA)

Christopher Charles John (born January 5, 1960) is an American politician and lobbyist who from 1997 to 2005 served as a Democratic member of the United States House of Representatives for Louisiana's 7th congressional district.

== Early life ==
Chris John was born in Crowley in Acadia Parish, one of six children, and reared as a Roman Catholic. He is of Lebanese, French, and German extraction. He attended Notre Dame Catholic High School in Crowley and Louisiana State University in Baton Rouge.

=== Early political activity ===
He was a page while his father, John N. John, III, was a member of the Louisiana House of Representatives. In the early 1980s, he was elected to the Crowley City Council.

== Congress ==
In 1996, John was elected to Congress. He defeated fellow Democrat Hunter Lundy in a runoff for the 7th district seat and was subsequently re-elected three times. He served from 1997 to 2005.

=== Senate race ===
In 2004, John announced he would not run for re-election to his House seat but would instead run for the seat in the U.S. Senate being vacated by popular Democrat and fellow Crowley native John Breaux, who endorsed him.

John, however, was defeated by Republican David Vitter of the New Orleans suburbs in the primary, Vitter garnered 51 percent of the vote, compared to 29 percent for John. The remainder of the ballots was split between then State Treasurer John Neely Kennedy and the African-American then-state senator Arthur Morrell, both Democrats. John's seat in the House fell into Republican hands, as Charles Boustany won the 7th district with 55 percent of the vote against Democrat Willie Landry Mount. Kennedy later switched parties and succeeded Vitter as senator in 2017.

== Post-political career ==
John is married to Payton Smith of Leesville, whose father, John R. Smith, is a member of the Louisiana State Senate and a former state House member. The Johns have two sons, who are twins.

=== Lobbying ===
After his House career ended, John worked for two years as a lobbyist in Washington, D.C. Since August 2007, he has made his home in Lafayette, where he is chief lobbyist for the United States Oil and Gas Association. (Morning Advocate).

== Honors ==
In 2009, John was inducted into the Louisiana Political Museum and Hall of Fame in Winnfield.

== Electoral history ==
Louisiana's 7th congressional district: Results 1996–2002
Year	Democrat	Votes	Pct	Republican	Votes	Pct	Other	Party	Votes	Pct
1996	Christopher John	128,449	53%	(no candidate)			Hunter Lundy	Democratic	113,351	47%
1998	Christopher John	*		(no candidate)						
2000	Christopher John	152,796	83%	(no candidate)			Michael P. Harris	Libertarian	30,687	17%
2002	Christopher John	138,659	87%	(no candidate)			Roberto Valletta	Libertarian	21,051	13%

*No vote totals were recorded in 1998. Section 511 of Title 18 of the Louisiana Revised Statutes, as amended, provides that a candidate who is unopposed is declared elected by the people and his/her name shall not appear on the ballot in either the primary or general election.

Louisiana Senator (Class III): 2004 results
Year	Democrats	Votes	Pct	Republicans	Votes	Pct	Other	Votes	Pct
2004	Christopher John	542,150	29%	David Vitter	943,014	51%	Richard M. Fontanesi	15,097	1%
	John Neely Kennedy	275,821	15%				R. A. Skip Galan	12,463	1%
	Arthur A. Morrell	47,222	3%						
	Sam Houston Melton Jr.	12,289	1%						

== See also ==
- List of Arab and Middle-Eastern Americans in the United States Congress

U.S. House of Representatives
Preceded by Jimmy Hayes	Member of the U.S. House of Representatives from Louisiana's 7th congressional district 1997–2005	Succeeded by Charles Boustany
Party political offices
Preceded by John S. Tanner	Chair of the Blue Dog Coalition for Communications; 1999–2001; Served alongside: Robert E. Cramer (Administration), Charles Stenholm (Policy)	Succeeded by Jim Turner
Preceded by Robert E. Cramer	Chair of the Blue Dog Coalition for Administration; 2001–2003; Served alongside: Jim Turner (Communications), Allen Boyd (Policy)	Succeeded by Jim Turner
Preceded by John Breaux	Democratic nominee for U.S. Senator from Louisiana (Class 3); 2004	Succeeded by Charlie Melancon
U.S. order of precedence (ceremonial)
Preceded by Jim Renacci as Former U.S. Representative	Order of precedence of the United States as Former U.S. Representative	Succeeded by John Fleming as Former U.S. Representative
