= Louisiana's 42nd House of Representatives district =

American legislative district

Louisiana's 42nd State House of Representatives district
Representative
Chance Keith Henry; R–Crowley

Louisiana's 42nd House of Representatives district is one of 105 Louisiana House of Representatives districts. It is currently represented by Republican Chance Keith Henry of Crowley.

== Geography ==
HD42 includes the cities of Crowley and Rayne.

== Election results ==
Year	Winning candidate	Party	Percent	Opponent	Party	Percent
2011	Jack Montoucet	Democratic	63%	Anthony Emmons	Republican Party	37%
2015	Jack Montoucet	Democratic	100%			
2017 - Special	John Stefanski	Republican	54.2%	Jay Suire	Republican	45.8%
2019	John Stefanski	Republican	100%			
2023	Chance Keith Henry	Republican	61.9%	Douglas J. LaCombe	Republican	38.1%
