= 2004 United States Senate election in Louisiana =

- November 2, 2004
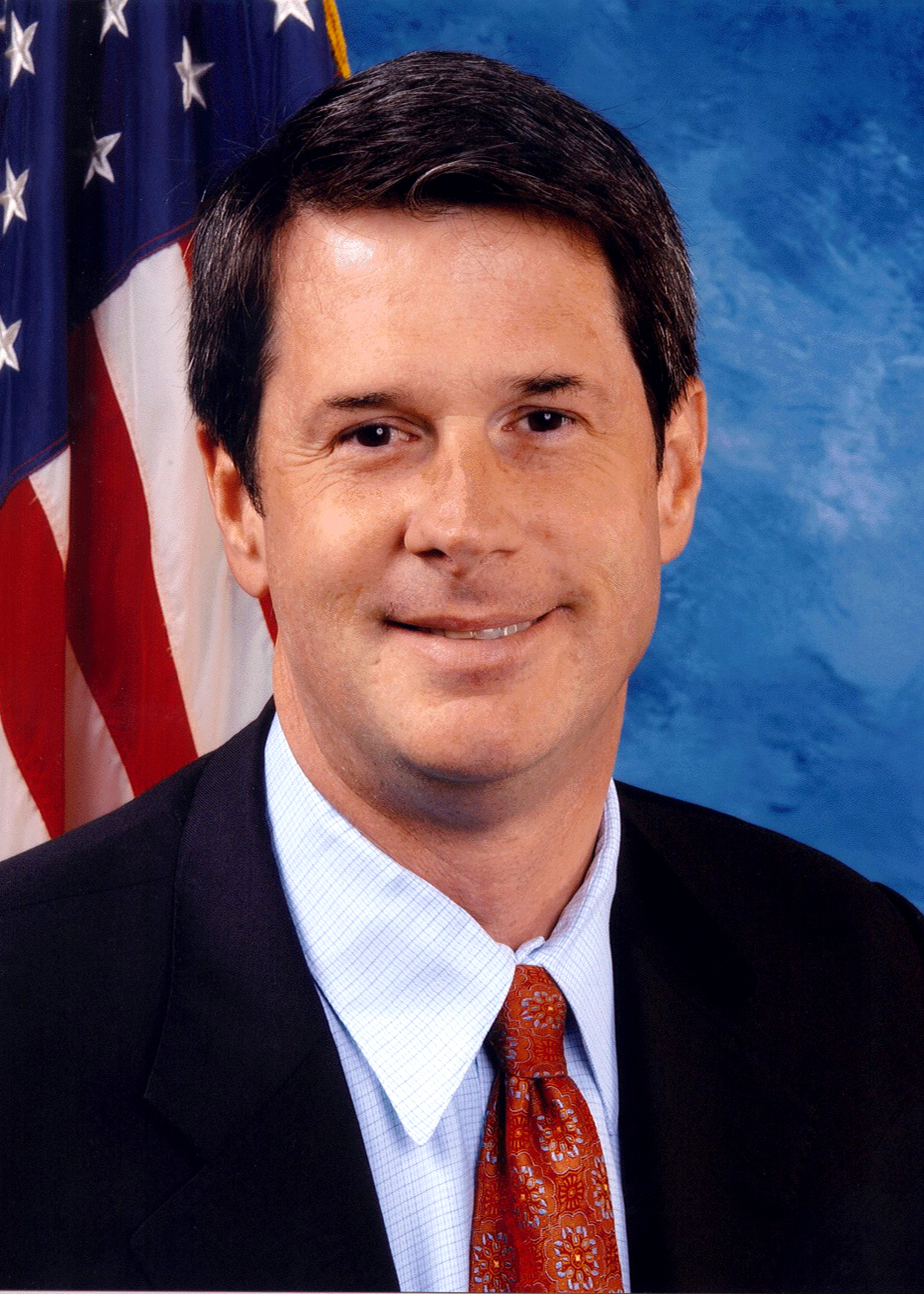

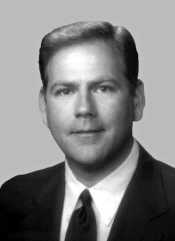

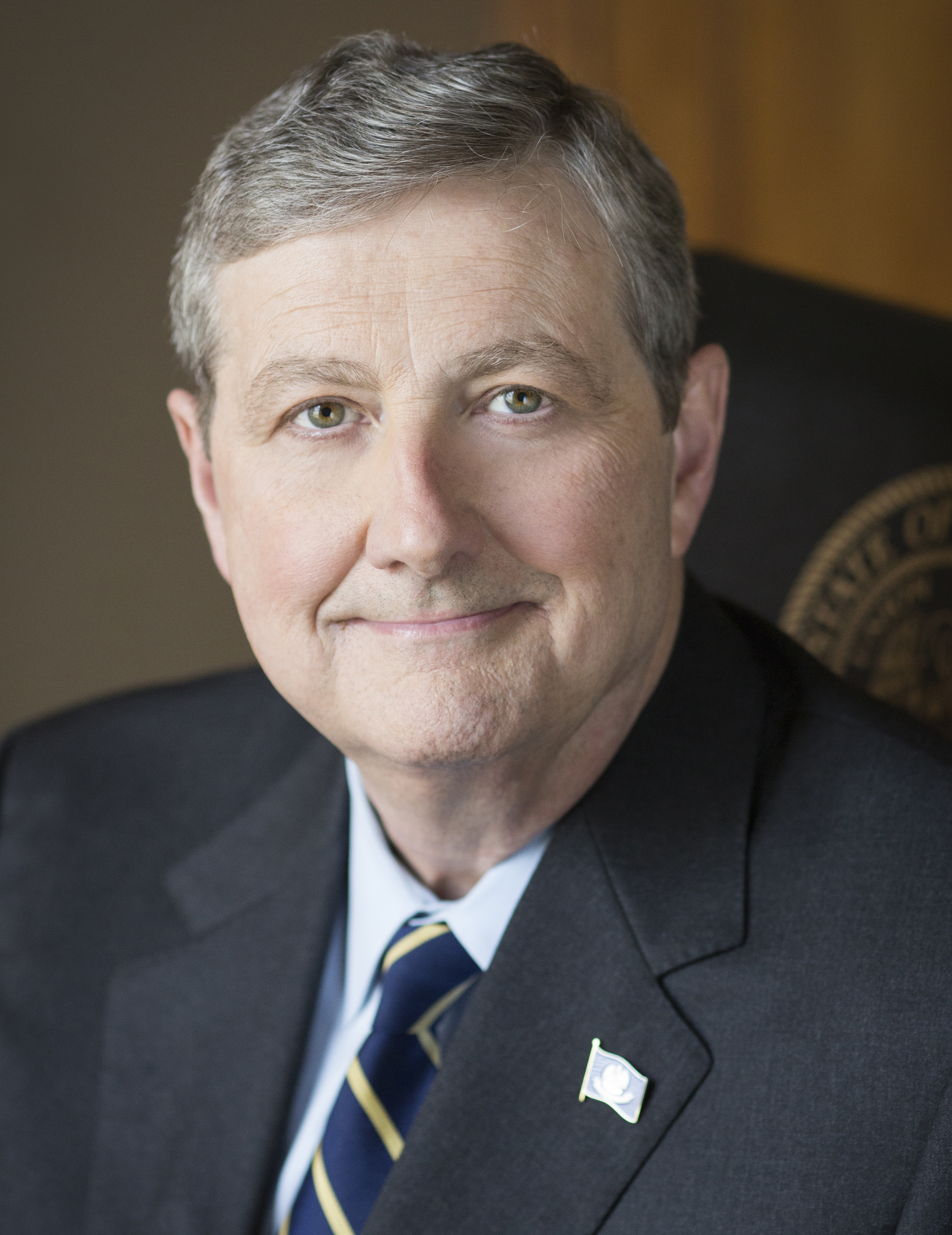
Candidate	David Vitter	Chris John	John Kennedy
Party	Republican	Democratic	Democratic
Popular vote	943,014	542,150	275,821
Percentage	51.03%	29.34%	14.92%
- Parish results Vitter: 30–40% 40–50% 50–60% 60–70% 70–80% John: 30–40% 40–50% 50–60%
U.S. senator before election
John Breaux
Democratic
Elected U.S. Senator
David Vitter
Republican

The 2004 United States Senate election in Louisiana was held on November 2, 2004. Incumbent Democratic Senator John Breaux decided to retire after three terms in office. Republican Representative David Vitter won the open seat with more than 50% of the primary vote. He thus avoided a runoff that would have otherwise been held on December 4, became the first Louisiana Republican elected to the U.S. Senate since 1876, and the first ever to be popularly elected. This was also the first time ever that a Republican won a full term to this Senate seat. The third-placed candidate, John Kennedy, won election to this same Senate seat as a Republican in 2016 when Vitter did not seek a third term. David Vitter's election ended the 33 elections streak democrats had held in Louisiana from 1914 to 2002 in the direct election era.

== Candidates ==
=== Democratic Party ===
- Chris John, U.S. Representative from Crowley
- John Neely Kennedy, Louisiana State Treasurer
- Arthur A. Morrell
- Sam Houston Melton Jr.

=== Republican Party ===
- David Vitter, U.S. Representative from Metairie

=== Independents ===
- Richard M. Fontanesi
- R.A. "Skip" Galan

== Campaign ==
Breaux, considered the most popular politician in Louisiana, endorsed Chris John prior to the jungle primary.

During the campaign, Vitter was accused by a member of the Louisiana Republican State Central Committee of having had a lengthy affair with a prostitute in New Orleans. Vitter responded that the allegation was "absolutely and completely untrue" and that it was "just crass Louisiana politics." The allegation later turned out to be true.

Vitter won the Louisiana jungle primary with 51% of the vote, avoiding the need for a runoff. John received 29.2% of the vote and Kennedy (no relation to the Massachusetts Kennedys), took 14.9%.

Vitter won at least a plurality in 55 of Louisiana's 64 parishes. John carried nine parishes, all but two of which (Iberville and Orleans) are part of the House district he represented.

Kennedy changed parties and unsuccessfully ran as Republican in 2008 against Louisiana's senior Senator, Democrat Mary Landrieu, but he was elected to the U.S. Senate in 2016 upon Vitter's retirement.

Vitter was the first Republican in Louisiana to be popularly elected as a U.S. Senator. The previous Republican Senator, William Pitt Kellogg, was chosen by the state legislature in 1876, in accordance with the process used before the Seventeenth Amendment to the United States Constitution went into effect in 1914.

=== Predictions ===
Source	Ranking	As of
Sabato's Crystal Ball	Lean R (flip)	November 1, 2004

=== Results ===
Louisiana United States Senate election, 2004
Party	Candidate	Votes	%	±%
Republican	David Vitter	943,014	51.03%	
Democratic	Chris John	542,150	29.34%	
Democratic	John Neely Kennedy	275,821	14.92%	
Democratic	Arthur A. Morrell	47,222	2.56%	
Independent	Richard M. Fontanesi	15,097	0.82%	
Independent	R. A. "Skip" Galan	12,463	0.67%	
Democratic	Sam Houston Melton, Jr.	12,289	0.66%	
Majority		400,864	21.69%	
Turnout		1,848,056	100%	
Republican gain from Democratic		Swing		

== Aftermath ==
Vitter won re-election in 2010 despite allegations of him soliciting prostitutes. He then unsuccessfully ran for Governor in 2015. While conceding defeat in that election, Vitter announced that he would not seek a third Senate term in 2016. The open seat was won by John Neely Kennedy, the second losing Democratic candidate from the 2004 race. In the interim, Kennedy switched parties in 2007 and unsuccessfully ran for Louisiana's other Senate seat in 2008 as a Republican.

== See also ==
- 2004 United States Senate elections
