= Close Up Foundation =

American civic education nonprofit

- Formation: 1971
- Founder: Stephen A. Janger
- Type: 501(c)(3) nonprofit
- Purpose: Civic education
- Headquarters: Arlington, Virginia, U.S.
- Chief executive officer: Eric Adydan
- President: Mia R. Charity
- Revenue: $39,919,109 (2024)
- Expenses: $42,003,184 (2024)
- Website: www.closeup.org

The Close Up Foundation is an American nonprofit civic education organization based in Arlington, Virginia. Stephen A. Janger founded it in 1971 to run programs for students and teachers on the federal government, public policy, and civic participation. Much of its programming revolves around trips to Washington, D.C., where students and teachers meet public officials and hear from policy speakers; the foundation has also produced classroom materials on current public issues.

== History ==
Janger, a former State Department official, developed the idea for Close Up in 1970 while running a student-exchange program. He wanted a civic education program with broader reach than the leadership-focused Washington programs then open to high school students, according to a 2005 profile in The Washington Post. The first Washington program ran in 1971 with students and teachers from Florida, Oklahoma, and Texas.

The foundation grew over the 1970s and 1980s. A 1984 account in the International Journal of Political Education described its Washington sessions as week-long programs meant to deepen students' understanding of the federal government and pull them into the political process. President Ronald Reagan took questions from participating students in 1986 during a session that C-SPAN taped for broadcast.

Janger stepped down as president and chief executive in 2005. By then, The Washington Post reported, roughly 650,000 students and teachers had taken part in Close Up programs, with about 20,000 more expected over the next year. Timothy S. Davis, who as a student had attended the first Close Up program, succeeded him. Eric Adydan became chief executive officer on January 1, 2023, taking over after Davis retired.

== Programs ==
Close Up runs civic education programs for middle and high school students along with professional development for teachers. Its Washington programs mix site visits, discussions of current issues, and meetings with elected officials or their staff, all organized around how the federal government is structured and operates.

In 2007, The Washington Post reported that the organization brought roughly 20,000 students and 2,000 teachers from 11,000 schools to Washington each year, and that its publishing arm turned out videos, teacher manuals, and student guides.

Close Up has also run programs tailored to teachers, middle school students, recent immigrants, and students from U.S. territories and freely associated states. A 2011 U.S. Department of Education budget justification described the Close Up Fellowships program as funding attendance at Close Up Washington programs for middle and secondary students from low-income families, their teachers, and recent immigrant students.

== Federal support and insular area programs ==
Some Close Up programs have drawn federal support. The U.S. Department of the Interior's Office of Insular Affairs has backed the foundation's insular area programming since 1987, describing it as offering civic education to students and educators from U.S. territories and freely associated states, including travel to Washington and meetings with figures in the executive and legislative branches and the diplomatic corps.

In fiscal year 2024, the Office of Insular Affairs awarded the foundation $1 million through its Technical Assistance Program to help students from U.S. territories and freely associated states take part in the Close Up Washington Student Program and related activities.

== Evaluation and research ==
Close Up has drawn attention from researchers and educators as a model of experiential civic education. Mary Jane Turner's 1984 article laid out the program's format and weighed its strengths and weaknesses as a civic education organization.

A 1990 paper by Angela M. Harwood looked at students from Georgia high schools who took part in Close Up during 1989, comparing 58 who attended the Washington program against 113 who did not. Once she controlled for pretest differences, Harwood found significant gains in political confidence, political trust, and political interest after the program, though the change in political efficacy fell short of the .05 significance level. She also noted that students who signed up for Close Up were already more politically engaged than the comparison group beforehand.

== Finances ==
For the fiscal year ending June 2024, ProPublica's Nonprofit Explorer, drawing on IRS Form 990 filings, put the foundation's revenue at $39.9 million against expenses of $42.0 million. Program services brought in $36.4 million (91.1 percent of revenue) and contributions $3.2 million (7.9 percent).

== Notable participants ==
Several Close Up participants have gone on to public office. The Washington Post reported in 2005 that U.S. senators Mary Landrieu and David Vitter were alumni and spoke at Janger's retirement celebration. A 2007 feature in the same paper named Brad Henry and Margaret Spellings among public figures connected to Close Up's alumni, and noted that Timothy S. Davis, its later chief executive, had attended the first Close Up program as a student.
