= 2015 Louisiana gubernatorial election =

- October 24, 2015 (first round); November 21, 2015 (runoff)
- Turnout: 39.2% ▼ (first round); 40.2% ▲ (runoff)
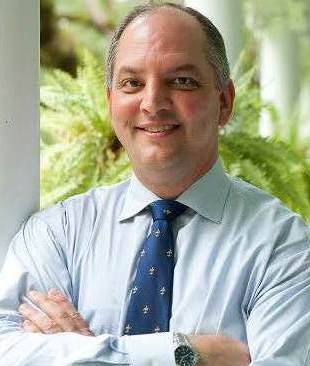

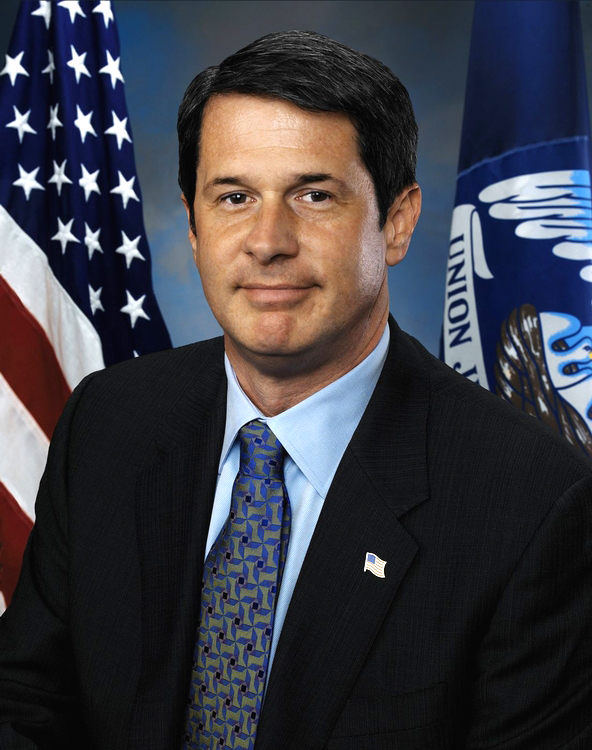

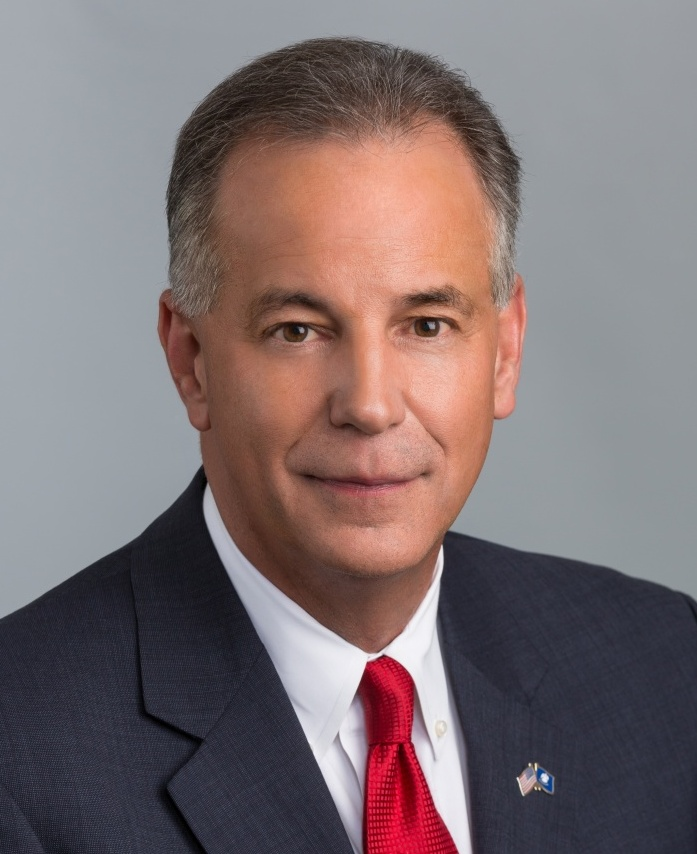

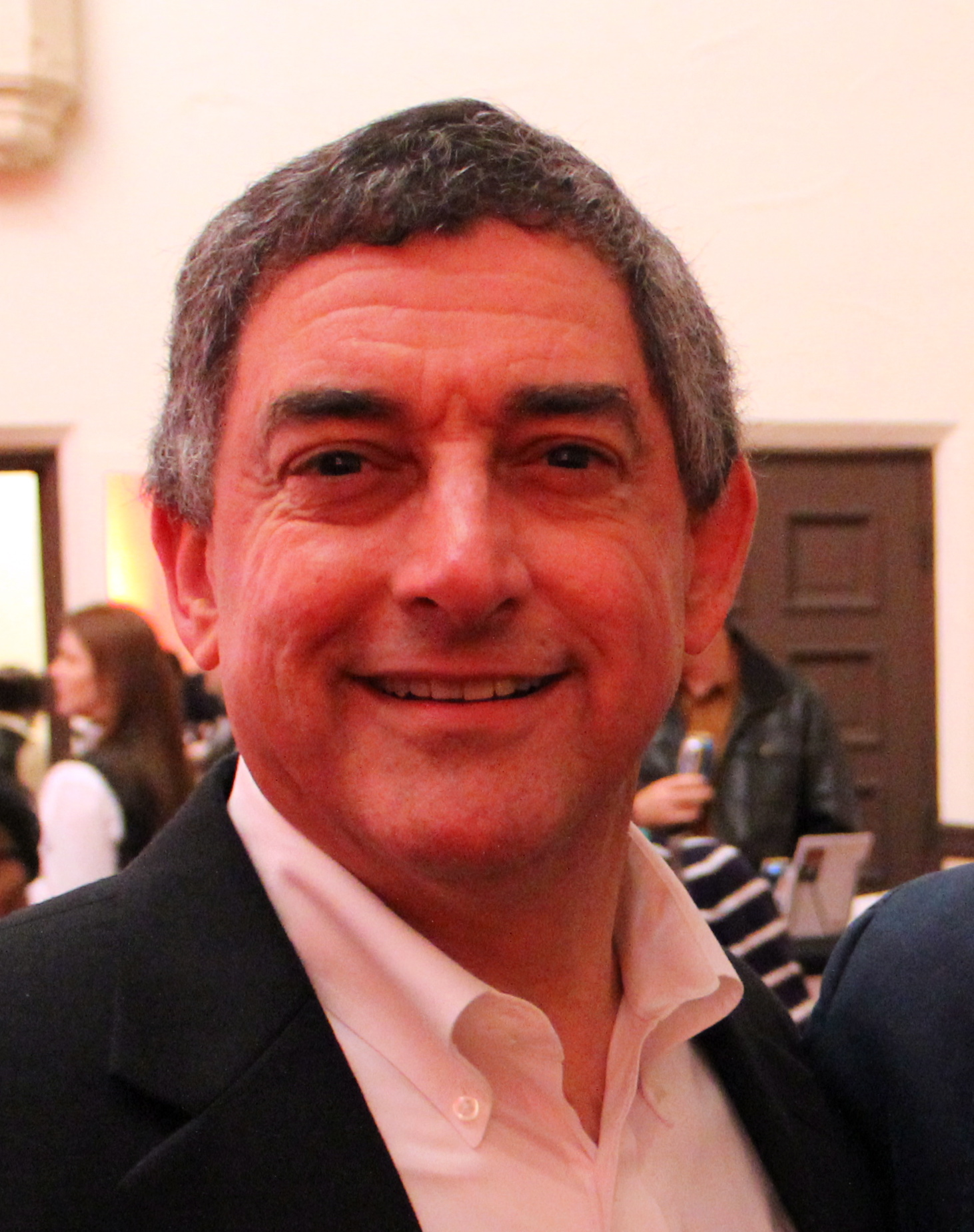
Nominee	John Bel Edwards	David Vitter
Party	Democratic	Republican
First round	444,517; 39.89%	256,300; 23.00%
Runoff	646,924; 56.11%	505,940; 43.89%
Candidate	Scott Angelle	Jay Dardenne
Party	Republican	Republican
First round	214,982; 19.29%	166,656; 14.96%
Runoff	Eliminated	Eliminated
- Edwards: 20–30% 30–40% 40–50% 50–60% 60–70% 70–80% 80–90% >90% Vitter: 20–30% 30–40% 40–50% 50–60% 60–70% 80–90% Angelle: 20–30% 30–40% 40–50% 50–60% 60–70% 70–80% 80–90% >90% Dardenne: 20–30% 30–40% 40–50% 50–60% 60–70% 70–80% 80–90% Deaton: >90% Odom: 70–80% Tie: 20–30% 30–40% 40–50% 50% No votes Edwards: 20–30% 30–40% 40–50% 50–60% 60–70% 70–80% 80–90% >90% Vitter: 20–30% 30–40% 40–50% 50–60% 60–70% 80–90% Angelle: 20–30% 30–40% 40–50% 50–60% 60–70% 70–80% 80–90% >90% Dardenne: 20–30% 30–40% 40–50% 50–60% 60–70% 70–80% 80–90% Deaton: >90% Odom: 70–80% Tie: 20–30% 30–40% 40–50% 50% No votes Edwards: 50–60% 60–70% 70–80% 80–90% >90% Vitter: 50–60% 60–70% 70–80% 80–90% Edwards: 50–60% 60–70% 70–80% 80–90% >90% Vitter: 50–60% 60–70% 70–80% 80–90% Edwards: 50–60% 60–70% 70–80% 80–90% >90% Vitter: 50–60% 60–70% 70–80% 80–90%
Governor before election
Bobby Jindal
Republican
Elected Governor
John Bel Edwards
Democratic

The 2015 Louisiana gubernatorial election was held on November 21, 2015, to elect the governor of Louisiana. Incumbent Republican governor Bobby Jindal was not eligible to run for re-election to a third term because of term limits established by the Louisiana Constitution.

Under Louisiana's jungle primary system, all candidates appeared on the same ballot, regardless of party and voters may vote for any candidate regardless of their party affiliation. As no candidate received a majority of the vote during the primary election on October 24, 2015, a runoff election was held on November 21, 2015, between the top two candidates in the primary. Louisiana is the only state that has a jungle primary system (California and Washington have a similar "top two primary" system).

The runoff election featured Democrat John Bel Edwards, Minority Leader of the Louisiana House of Representatives, and Republican U.S. senator David Vitter, as they were the top two vote getters in the primary. Lieutenant Governor Jay Dardenne and Public Service Commissioner Scott Angelle, both Republicans, were eliminated in the jungle primary.

In the November 21, 2015 runoff, Edwards defeated Vitter by a count of 56.11% to 43.89% and was sworn in on January 11, 2016. This was the only statewide victory in 2015 for Democrats in Louisiana, and was the first time Democrats won a statewide election in the state since Mary Landrieu won her third term in the U.S. Senate in 2008. Edwards' victory also came one year after national wins for the Republican Party in congressional and state elections, including Landrieu’s failed 2014 re-election bid. This was the first election since 1968 that a Democratic candidate for governor won during a Democratic presidency. The election was one of the most expensive in state history, with over $50 million spent by the candidates and outside groups.

== Candidates ==
=== Republican Party ===
==== Filed ====
- Scott Angelle, Public Service Commissioner and former lieutenant governor of Louisiana
- Jay Dardenne, Lieutenant Governor of Louisiana
- David Vitter, U.S. senator

==== Declined ====
- John Neely Kennedy, Louisiana State Treasurer (running for re-election)
- Newell Normand, Sheriff of Jefferson Parish (endorsed Dardenne)
- Michael G. Strain, Commissioner of Agriculture and Forestry (running for re-election)
- Rodney Alexander, former secretary of the Louisiana Department of Veterans Affairs and former U.S. representative
- Burl Cain, Warden of the Louisiana State Penitentiary
- Gerald Long, state senator
- Buddy Roemer, former governor, former U.S. representative and candidate for president in 2012

=== Democratic Party ===
==== Filed ====
- John Bel Edwards, Minority Leader of the Louisiana House of Representatives
- Cary Deaton, candidate for governor in 2011
- SL Simpson

==== Declined ====
- Mary Landrieu, former U.S. senator, state treasurer and candidate for governor in 1995
- Mitch Landrieu, Mayor of New Orleans and former lieutenant governor of Louisiana
- John Georges, Businessman and independent candidate for governor in 2007
- Jason Williams, New Orleans City Council President
- Tony Clayton, prosecutor of the 18th Judicial District Court, member of the Southern University system board
- James Bernhard, businessman
- Foster Campbell, Public Service Commissioner, former state senator and candidate for governor in 2007

=== Ineligible ===
- Edwin Edwards, former governor, U.S. representative and state senator (ineligible due to 2000 felony convictions for bribery and racketeering)

=== Independents ===
==== Filed ====
- Beryl Billiot, restaurant owner and former Marine
- Jeremy Odom, minister
- Eric Paul Orgeron

==== Declined ====
- Melvin Slack, candidate for Mayor of Shreveport in 2014
- Russel L. Honoré, retired lieutenant general and former commander of Joint Task Force Katrina

=== Endorsements ===
Scott Angelle

Organizations

- Terrebonne Republican Party
- Republican Party of East Baton Rouge Parish
- Livingston Parish Republican Party

Publishers

- Greater Baton Rouge Business Report
- The Hayride, Louisiana Conservative Political Commentary Site

Public Figures

- Ali Landry, former Miss USA

Politicians

- Paul Hardy, 48th lieutenant governor of Louisiana
- Fred Mills, Louisiana state senator
- Guy Cormier, St. Martin Parish President
Jay Dardenne

Politicians

- Newell Normand, Sheriff of Jefferson Parish
John Bel Edwards

Organizations

- Louisiana AFL–CIO
- Louisiana Democratic State Central Committee
- Louisiana Federation of Teachers
- Louisiana Sheriff's Association
- Louisiana State Troopers Association (endorsed during runoff campaign)

Politicians

- Barack Obama, President of the United States
- Mitch Landrieu, Mayor of New Orleans
- Jamie Mayo, Mayor of Monroe
- Jay Dardenne, Lt. Governor of Louisiana and former candidate for governor (endorsed during runoff campaign)

Newspapers

- Gambit
David Vitter

Organizations

- Gun Owners of America
- Louisiana Association of Business and Industry (endorsed during runoff campaign)

Politicians

- Ralph Abraham, U.S. representative (R-LA)
- Charles Boustany, U.S. representative (R-LA)
- George H. W. Bush, 41st president of the United States
- Jeb Bush, former governor of Florida and 2016 presidential candidate.
- Bill Cassidy, U.S. senator (R-LA)
- Chris Christie, Governor of New Jersey and 2016 presidential candidate.
- Joey Durel, Lafayette City-Parish president
- John Fleming, U.S. representative (R-LA)
- John Neely Kennedy, Treasurer of Louisiana
- Rand Paul, U.S. senator (R-KY) and 2016 presidential candidate.

== Jungle primary ==
=== Polling ===
Poll source	Date(s) administered	Sample size	Margin of error	Scott Angelle (R)	Jay Dardenne (R)	John Bel Edwards (D)	John Kennedy (R)	Mitch Landrieu (D)	David Vitter (R)	Other	Undecided
MarblePortLLC	October 20–21, 2015	1464	± 3%	12.7%	14.1%	40.5%	—	—	28.5%	—	4.3%
MRI	October 15–19, 2015	600	± ?%	17%	14%	36%	—	—	19%	2%	12%
Harper Polling (R)	October 16–17, 2015	612	± 3.9%	14%	14%	36%	—	—	26%	—	9%
KPLC/Raycom Media	October 7–13, 2015	602	± 4%	7%	8%	24%	—	—	21%	—	37%
The Advocate/WWL-TV	September 20–23, 2015	800	± 3.46%	15%	14%	24%	—	—	24%	—	18%
Public Policy Polling	September 21–22, 2015	616	± 4%	15%	14%	28%	—	—	27%	—	17%
Verne Kennedy	July 27–31, 2015	600	± 4%	25%	12%	20%	—	—	22%	—	21%
MarblePort	June 17, 2015	1415	± 2.6%	11.1%	10.4%	28.8%	—	—	34.1%	—	15.6%
Verne Kennedy	May 27–29, 2015	700	± 3.5%	17%	12%	29%	—	—	29%	—	13%
SM&O Research	May 5, 2015	600	± 4.0%	6%	17%	25%	—	—	38%	—	16%
MarblePort	March 17, 2015	1,071	± 2.99%	7%	14%	31%	—	—	34%	—	14%
Triumph	March 5, 2015	1,655	± 2.4%	7%	15%	33%	—	—	35%	—	11%
NSO Research*	January 10–13, 2015	600	± 4%	2%	10%	20%	13%	—	24%	—	32%
SM&O Research	December 9–11, 2014	600	± ?	3.1%	18.6%	25.7%	—	—	36.3%	—	16.3%
Suffolk	October 23–26, 2014	500	± 4%	3%	9.8%	3.8%	—	22.6%	31.6%	—	29.2%
Multi-Quest	October 22–24, 2014	606	± 4%	2.3%	10.9%	4%	—	—	25.9%	3.8%	53.1%
SM&O Research	April 28–30, 2014	600	± ?	3.8%	10.5%	5.5%	11.7%	28.9%	28.9%	—	10.6%
PSB	April 2014	601	± ?	—	14%	17%	8%	—	18%	14%	29%
Magellan	March 24–26, 2014	600	± 4.1%	—	13.1%	4.6%	8.5%	26.4%	27.6%	—	19.8%
V/C Research	February 20–25, 2014	600	± 4%	—	11%	8%	9%	33%	25%	—	15%
Kitchens Group**	February 10–12, 2014	600	± 4.2%	—	9%	21%	7%	—	26%	—	38%
WPAOR^	November 12–14, 2013	800	± 3.5%	—	12%	2%	9%	20%	25%	11%	11
WPAOR^	November 12–14, 2013	800	± 3.5%	—	22%	—	—	29%	35%	—	14%
SM&O Research	November 6–12, 2013	600	± 4%	2.1%	18%	7.9%	18.9%	—	30.3%	—	22.9%
Magellan	October 2–4, 2012	2,862	± 1.9%	—	6.5%	—	7.2%	29.4%	31.1%	9.1%	16.7%

- * Internal poll for the John Kennedy campaign
- ** Internal poll for the John Bel Edwards campaign
- ^ Internal poll for the Jay Dardenne campaign

=== Results ===
Louisiana gubernatorial election, 2015
Party	Candidate	Votes	%
Democratic	John Bel Edwards	444,517	39.89
Republican	David Vitter	256,300	23.00
Republican	Scott Angelle	214,982	19.29
Republican	Jay Dardenne	166,656	14.96
Democratic	Cary Deaton	11,763	1.06
Democratic	S.L. Simpson	7,420	0.67
Independent	Beryl Billiot	5,694	0.51
Independent	Jeremy Odom	4,756	0.43
Independent	Eric Orgeron	2,248	0.2
Total votes		1,114,336	100

== Runoff ==
=== Campaign ===
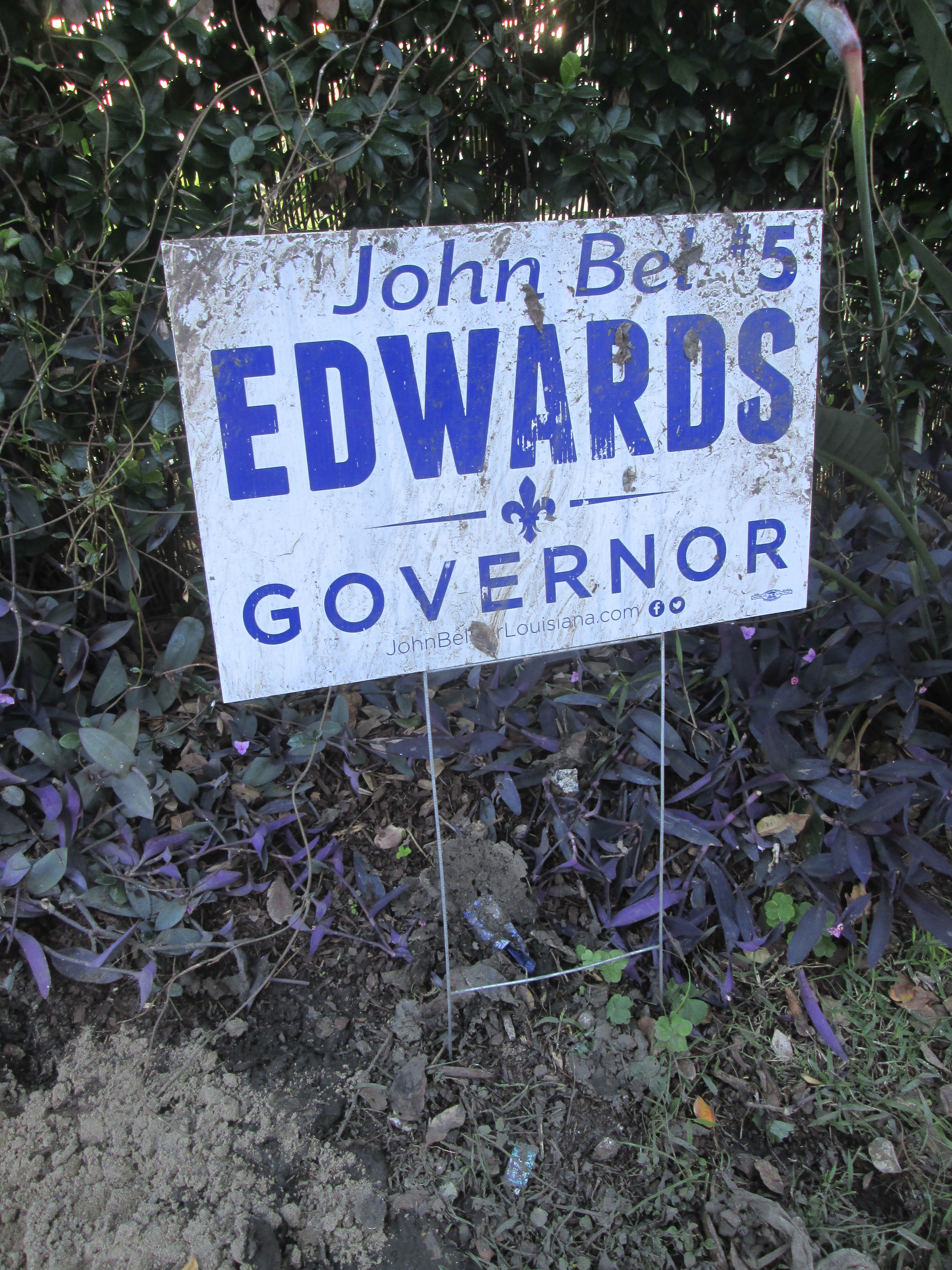
Sign for John Bel Edwards

A debate between Edwards and Vitter was held on November 10 by Louisiana Public Broadcasting and the Council for a Better Louisiana.

Early voting was possible from November 7 until November 14. Despite having one fewer day due to Veterans Day, turnout was significantly higher compared to the primary election early voting, especially among black voters and in urban parishes.

=== Debates ===
- Complete video of debate, November 10, 2015

=== Predictions ===
Source	Ranking	As of
The Cook Political Report	Lean D (flip)	November 13, 2015
Rothenberg Political Report	Tossup	November 6, 2015
Sabato's Crystal Ball	Lean D (flip)	November 19, 2015
DKE	Tossup	October 29, 2015

=== Polling ===
View source data.

Poll source	Date(s) administered	Sample size	Margin of error	David Vitter (R)	John Bel Edwards (D)	Undecided
JMC Analytics	November 19, 2015	614	± 3.9%	43%	47%	10%
RRH Elections	November 12–16, 2015	359	± 5%	42%	48%	10%
JMC Analytics	November 14–16, 2015	635	± 3.9%	35%	51%	13%
JMC Analytics	November 14–16, 2015	635	± 4%	38%	54%	8%
Market Research Insight	November 11–14, 2015	600	± 4%	38%	53%	9%
Hayride/MarblePort	November 11, 2015	978	± 3.1%	42%	48%	10%
Market Research Insight	November 11, 2015	600	± 4%	38%	52%	10%
UNO Survey Research Center	November 2–8, 2015	600	± 4%	34%	56%	10%
Triumph Campaigns	November 5, 2015	1,818	± 3%	41%	49%	10%
WVLA/JMC Analytics	October 28–31, 2015	600	± 4%	32%	52%	16%
Market Research Insight	October 27–28, 2015	600	± 4.1%	38%	54%	8%
Anzalone Liszt Grove	October 26–28, 2015	700	± 3.7%	40%	52%	7%
KPLC/Raycom Media	October 7–13, 2015	602	± 4%	33%	52%	?%
The Advocate/WWL-TV	September 20–23, 2015	800	± 3.46%	41%	45%	?%
Public Policy Polling	September 21–22, 2015	616	± 4%	38%	50%	12%
Public Policy Polling	September 25–28, 2014	1,141	± 2.9%	50%	32%	18%
Public Policy Polling	June 26–29, 2014	664	± 3.8%	52%	30%	17%
The Kitchen Group*	February 10–12, 2014	600	± 4.2%	38%	32%	31%
Public Policy Polling	February 6–9, 2014	635	± 3.9%	51%	30%	19%

*Internal poll for the John Bel Edwards campaign

Hypothetical polling

Dardenne vs. Landrieu

Poll source	Date(s) administered	Sample size	Margin of error	Jay Dardenne (R)	Mitch Landrieu (D)	Undecided
Public Policy Polling	September 25–28, 2014	1,141	± 2.9%	43%	39%	18%
Public Policy Polling	June 26–29, 2014	664	± 3.8%	43%	43%	15%
Public Policy Polling	February 6–9, 2014	635	± 3.9%	46%	36%	18%
Public Policy Polling	August 16–19, 2013	721	± 3.6%	35%	45%	20%
Public Policy Polling	February 8–12, 2013	603	± 4%	42%	44%	15%

Duke vs. Edwards

Poll source	Date(s) administered	Sample size	Margin of error	David Duke (R)	Edwin Edwards (D)	Undecided
Public Policy Polling	February 8–12, 2013	603	± 4%	15%	62%	23%

Vitter vs. Landrieu

Poll source	Date(s) administered	Sample size	Margin of error	David Vitter (R)	Mitch Landrieu (D)	Undecided
SM&O Research	April 28–30, 2014	600	± ?	52.8%	41.8%	5.5%
Gravis Marketing	November 12–14, 2014	643	± 4%	54%	36%	10%
Public Policy Polling	September 25–28, 2014	1,141	± 2.9%	47%	38%	14%
Gravis Marketing	September 5–9, 2014	426	± 5%	46%	44%	11%
Public Policy Polling	June 26–29, 2014	664	± 3.8%	48%	44%	8%
Public Policy Polling	February 6–9, 2014	635	± 3.9%	50%	37%	13%
Public Policy Polling	August 16–19, 2013	721	± 3.6%	42%	45%	14%
Harper Polling	August 14–15, 2013	596	± 4.01%	45%	43%	12%
Public Policy Polling	February 8–12, 2013	603	± 4%	44%	44%	13%
Magellan Strategies	October 2–4, 2012	2,862	± 1.9%	45.2%	39.8%	15%

=== Results ===
Edwards' win was the first statewide win for Democrats in Louisiana since Mary Landrieu won a third term to the Senate in 2008. He performed surprisingly well for a Democratic candidate in Louisiana, given that the Cook PVI for the state was R+12 at the time of the election and most Republican candidates won in landslides in prior statewide elections. He performed especially well in Caddo Parish (home of Shreveport), East Baton Rouge Parish, (home of Baton Rouge), and in the reliably Democratic Orleans Parish, (home of New Orleans). Turnout was slightly higher in the November run-off than in the October jungle primary.

Louisiana gubernatorial election runoff, 2015
Party	Candidate	Votes	%
Democratic	John Bel Edwards	646,924	56.11%
Republican	David Vitter	505,940	43.89%
Total votes		1,152,864	100%
Democratic gain from Republican			

==== By congressional district ====
Edwards won five of six congressional districts, including four that were represented by Republicans.

District	Vitter	Edwards	Representative
1st	57%	43%	Steve Scalise
2nd	17%	83%	Cedric Richmond
3rd	49.9%	50.1%	Charles Boustany
4th	47%	53%	John Fleming
5th	46%	54%	Ralph Abraham
6th	46%	54%	Garret Graves

== See also ==
- 2015 Louisiana elections
