= Charlie Melançon =

American politician (born 1947)

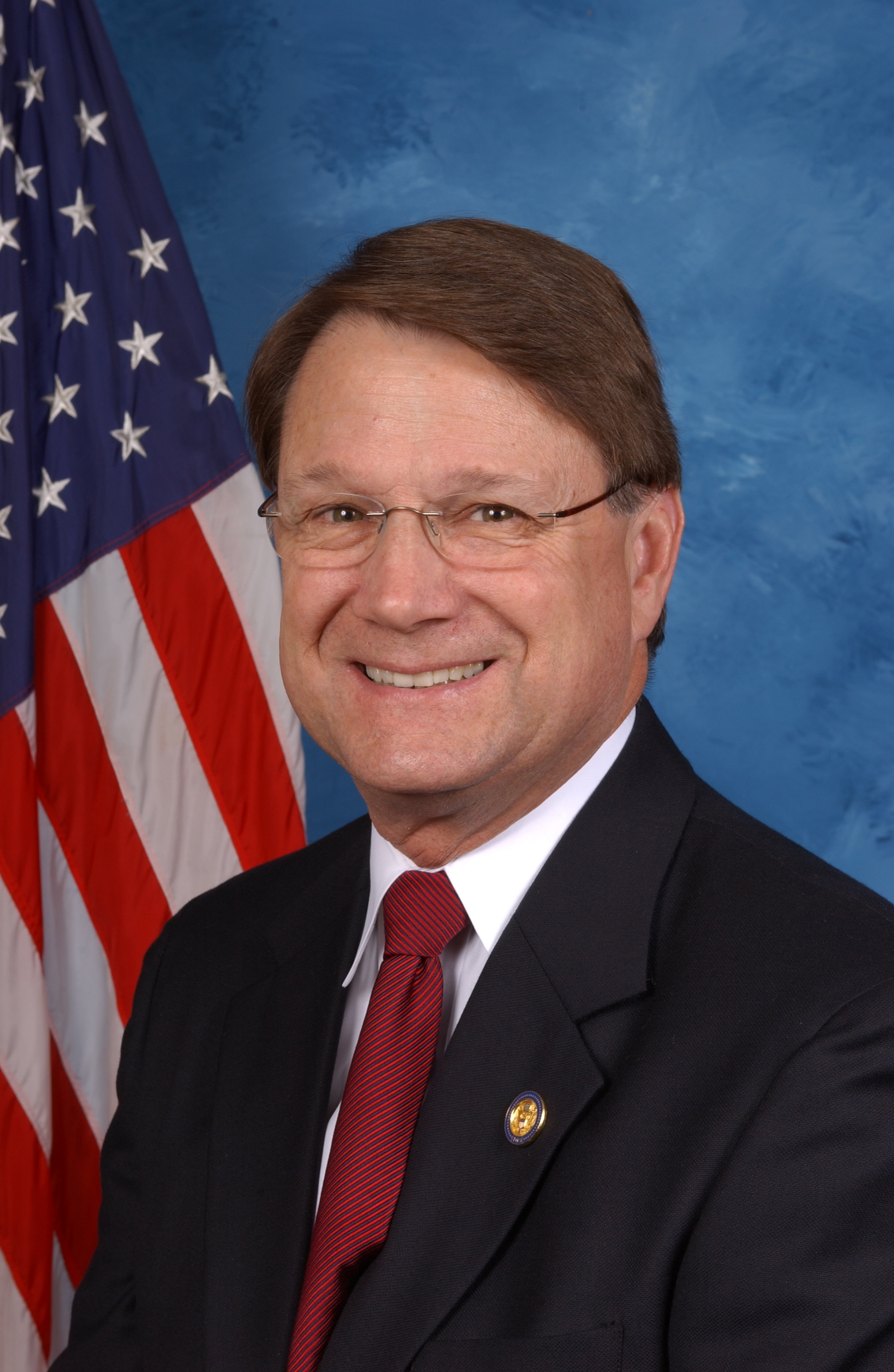
- Official portrait, 2005

Secretary of the Louisiana Department of Wildlife and Fisheries
- In office January 11, 2016 – December 22, 2016
- Governor: John Bel Edwards
- Preceded by: Robert Barham
- Succeeded by: Patrick Banks (acting)

Member of the U.S. House of Representatives from Louisiana's 3rd district
- In office January 3, 2005 – January 3, 2011
- Preceded by: Billy Tauzin
- Succeeded by: Jeff Landry

Member of the Louisiana House of Representatives from the 60th district
- In office 1987–1993
- Preceded by: Soup Kember
- Succeeded by: Audrey McCain

Personal details
- Born: Charles Joseph Melançon; October 3, 1947 (age 78) Napoleonville, Louisiana, U.S.
- Party: Democratic
- Spouse: Peachy Clark
- Children: 2
- Education: University of Louisiana, Lafayette (BS)

Charles Joseph Melançon (/məˈlɑːnsɒn/; born October 3, 1947) is an American politician and former secretary of the Louisiana Department of Wildlife and Fisheries.

From 2005 to 2011, he was the U.S. representative for Louisiana's 3rd congressional district. He earlier served as a state representative, from 1987 to 1993. In 2010, he was the unsuccessful Democratic nominee for the U.S. Senate seat held by the Republican David Vitter.

== Early life, education and career ==
Melançon was born in Napoleonville, Louisiana, the son of Nicee L. "Brownie" (née Talbot) and Joe Melançon. The grandson and great-grandson of sugar cane farmers, Melançon has spent most of his life in Napoleonville, 50 miles south of Baton Rouge. He owned and operated several small businesses, including two Baskin-Robbins outlets. He also served as head of the American Sugar Cane League.

== U.S. House of Representatives ==
Melançon ran in 2004 for the House of Representatives seat in Louisiana's 3rd congressional district and won.

=== Committee assignments ===
- Committee on Energy and Commerce
  - Subcommittee on Communications, Technology and the Internet
  - Subcommittee on Energy and Environment

Very soon after being sworn in January 2005, Melançon joined the Blue Dog Coalition. Like most Southern Democrats, he is more conservative than most members of the national party, especially on social issues. But he did vote for the DREAM Act and repealing "Don't Ask, Don't Tell".

=== Hurricanes Katrina and Rita ===
Just a few months after Melancon took office, Hurricane Katrina slammed into south Louisiana, causing massive levee failures and devastating flooding in the eastern part of his district. A second major storm, Hurricane Rita, struck the Gulf Coast three weeks later. Melancon worked with the rest of the Louisiana delegation in Congress to bring billions of recovery dollars to south Louisiana. He fought for federal funding for hurricane protection projects such as Morganza-to-the-Gulf and the levee systems in lower Plaquemines Parish and south Lafourche Parish.

Melancon has continuously urged other members of the United States Congress to visit south Louisiana for as long as Louisiana still has recovery or hurricane protection needs. He has brought Congressional delegations to the Gulf Coast to see firsthand the destruction from the storms as well as the ongoing need for hurricane protection and coastal restoration. Since the storms, Melancon has sponsored a number of reform bills to try to fix the flaws in the government's disaster response and relief system. As the representative for much of south Louisiana, Melançon has been an advocate in the United States Congress for hurricane recovery.

=== Supporting small businesses and economic development ===
Melancon supported the Job Creation Through Entrepreneurship Act (H.R. 2352), a bill that provided funding for more small business development centers. These small business incubators provide office space, support, and technology to help new companies get off the ground. He also supported tax relief for small businesses, voting for the Small Business Tax Relief Act of 2007 (H.R. 976). The bill provided tax credits and incentives for expanding and purchasing new equipment. Melançon joined other members from energy-producing states, as well as the Louisiana Oil and Gas Association, to keep new taxes on the oil and gas industry out of the President's 2010 budget.

=== Climate change ===
Melancon voted against the American Clean Energy and Security Act (H.R. 2454) twice, once in the Energy and Commerce Committee and again in the full the United States House of Representatives. The bill is also known as the "Waxman-Markey Energy Bill" or the "cap-and-trade" bill. Melançon said in a release that he opposed the bill because he believed it would hurt his "district and the people I represent … The oil and gas industry is the engine driving south Louisiana's economy, providing good-paying jobs to hundreds of thousands of our workers for generations."

Melancon was successful in including an amendment in the bill that would protect Louisiana's share of wetlands restoration funding from cuts indirectly caused by hurricane disaster assistance.

=== America's Affordable Health Choices Act ===
On July 31, 2009, Melançon voted against the America's Affordable Health Choices Act (H.R. 3200) in the Energy and Commerce Committee. Melançon explained in a statement that he voted against the bill for reasons including its potential effects on small businesses, the possibility of taxpayer-funded abortions, and increases in taxes.

Melançon said he was concerned that "the public option, as designed, would unfairly undercut anything the private sector could offer." He noted that the bill does not do enough to address the need for more providers in rural communities.

Melancon also voted against the Patient Protection and Affordable Care Act in March 2010, because it "doesn’t work for Louisiana." However, he had not signed the discharge petition circulated by Iowa Republican Steve King calling for a complete repeal of the law.

=== American Recovery and Reinvestment Act of 2009 ===
Melançon voted for the American Recovery and Reinvestment Act of 2009. In explaining his vote for the legislation, Melançon said, "The people of south Louisiana sent me to Congress because I promised to listen to them and do what I thought was right, not what was most popular or what my party told me to do. This plan, while far from perfect, will create or save an estimated 50,000 jobs in Louisiana, invest over $538 million in infrastructure projects for our state, and lay a foundation for long-term growth for our country through innovation and education."

=== Emergency Economic Stabilization Act of 2008 ===
Melancon voted for the Emergency Economic Stabilization Act of 2008.

=== Employee Free Choice Act ===
Although Melancon is listed as a co-sponsor of the Employee Free Choice Act, his comments on the bill indicate a more ambivalent measure of support. He has stated, "I understand many of the concerns expressed by the business community. I am interested in bringing both sides together to work out their differences and develop a bipartisan solution that will address some of these concerns, while still protecting employees’ rights."

=== Federal Marriage Amendment ===
In July 2006, Rep. Melancon voted in support of the Federal Marriage Amendment.

=== Matthew Shepard Act of 2009 ===
On 29 April 2009, Rep. Melancon voted against the federal hate crimes expansion bill known as the Matthew Shepard Act.

== Political campaigns ==
=== 2004 U.S. House campaign ===
Melancon declared his candidacy for Congress after longtime incumbent Billy Tauzin announced his retirement. Although he was considered an underdog for much of the race, he entered a runoff due to an especially ugly intraparty battle between Republican candidates Billy Tauzin III and state Senator Craig Romero, the former candidate being the son of the incumbent. In the runoff campaign, Melançon repeatedly hammered away at Tauzin III's family ties. Melançon won a victory by 569 votes. Romero set his sights on challenging Melançon in 2006, and was defeated again.

=== 2006 U.S. House campaign ===
On November 7, 2006, Melancon defeated Romero 55% to 40% to win a second term in the U.S. House.

=== 2008 U.S. House campaign ===
He was re-elected without opposition in November 2008. Because of William J. Jefferson's defeat on December 6 after federal corruption indictments, Melancon became the sole Democrat representing Louisiana in the U.S. House.

=== 2010 U.S. Senate campaign ===
Melançon challenged incumbent Republican U.S. Senator David Vitter in 2010. In announcing his candidacy on August 27, 2009, he billed himself as "a proud centrist" and "a straight up the middle fighter for the little guy."

== Secretary of the Louisiana Department of Wildlife and Fisheries ==
Edwards announced that state Representative Jack Montoucet of Scott in Lafayette Parish would take office in January 2017 to succeed Melancon as the wildlife and fisheries secretary.

== Personal life ==
Melançon is married to the former Peachy Clark; they have two children.

U.S. House of Representatives
Preceded by Billy Tauzin	Member of the U.S. House of Representatives from Louisiana's 3rd congressional district 2005–2011	Succeeded by Jeff Landry
Party political offices
Preceded by Mike Ross	Chair of the Blue Dog Coalition for Communications; 2009; Served alongside: Stephanie Herseth Sandlin (Administration), Baron Hill (Policy)	Succeeded by Jim Matheson
Vacant Title last held by John Breaux	Democratic nominee for U.S. Senator from Louisiana (Class 3); 2010	Succeeded by Foster Campbell
Political offices
Preceded by Robert Barham	Secretary of the Louisiana Department of Wildlife and Fisheries; 2016	Succeeded by Patrick Banks; Acting
U.S. order of precedence (ceremonial)
Preceded by Betty Sutton as Former U.S. Representative	Order of precedence of the United States as Former U.S. Representative	Succeeded by Ralph Abraham as Former U.S. Representative
