= David Vitter =

American politician (born 1961)

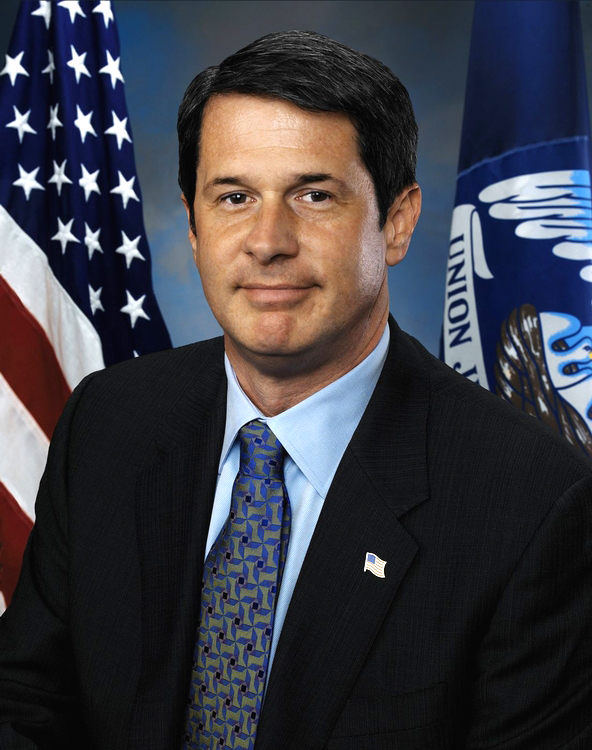
- Official portrait, 2005

Chair of the Senate Small Business Committee
- In office January 3, 2015 – January 3, 2017
- Preceded by: Maria Cantwell
- Succeeded by: Jim Risch

United States Senator from Louisiana
- In office January 3, 2005 – January 3, 2017
- Preceded by: John Breaux
- Succeeded by: John Kennedy

Member of the U.S. House of Representatives from Louisiana's 1st district
- In office May 29, 1999 – January 3, 2005 (Note: Vitter's official service begins on the date of the special election, while he was not sworn in until June 8, 1999.)
- Preceded by: Bob Livingston
- Succeeded by: Bobby Jindal

Member of the Louisiana House of Representatives from the 81st district
- In office 1992–1999
- Preceded by: David Duke
- Succeeded by: Jennifer Sneed Heebe

Personal details
- Born: David Bruce Vitter; May 3, 1961 (age 65) New Orleans, Louisiana, U.S.
- Party: Republican
- Spouse: Wendy Baldwin (m. 1990)
- Relations: Jeffrey Vitter (brother)
- Children: 4
- Education: Harvard University (BA); Magdalen College, Oxford (BA); Tulane University (JD)
- Vitter's voice Vitter on the fifth anniversary of the Deepwater Horizon oil spill. Recorded April 20, 2015

David Bruce Vitter (born May 3, 1961) is an American politician who served as a United States senator from Louisiana from 2005 to 2017. A member of the Republican Party, Vitter served in the Louisiana House of Representatives from 1992 to 1999 and in the United States House of Representatives from 1999 to 2005.

Vitter was first elected to the U.S. Senate in 2004. He was the first Republican to represent Louisiana in the Senate since the Reconstruction Era, and the first ever Republican to be popularly elected. In 2007, Vitter admitted to and apologized for past involvement with prostitution as a client of a Washington, D.C. escort service. Despite Vitter's disclosure, he was re-elected to the Senate in 2010; however, the disclosure is believed to have played a part in his loss of the 2015 gubernatorial election. Vitter ran for governor to succeed the term-limited Bobby Jindal in the 2015 gubernatorial election, losing the general election to Democrat John Bel Edwards. While conceding defeat to Edwards, Vitter announced that he would not seek reelection to the Senate in 2016 and would retire from office at the completion of his term. Following the conclusion of his second Senate term, Vitter became a lobbyist.

== Early life and education ==
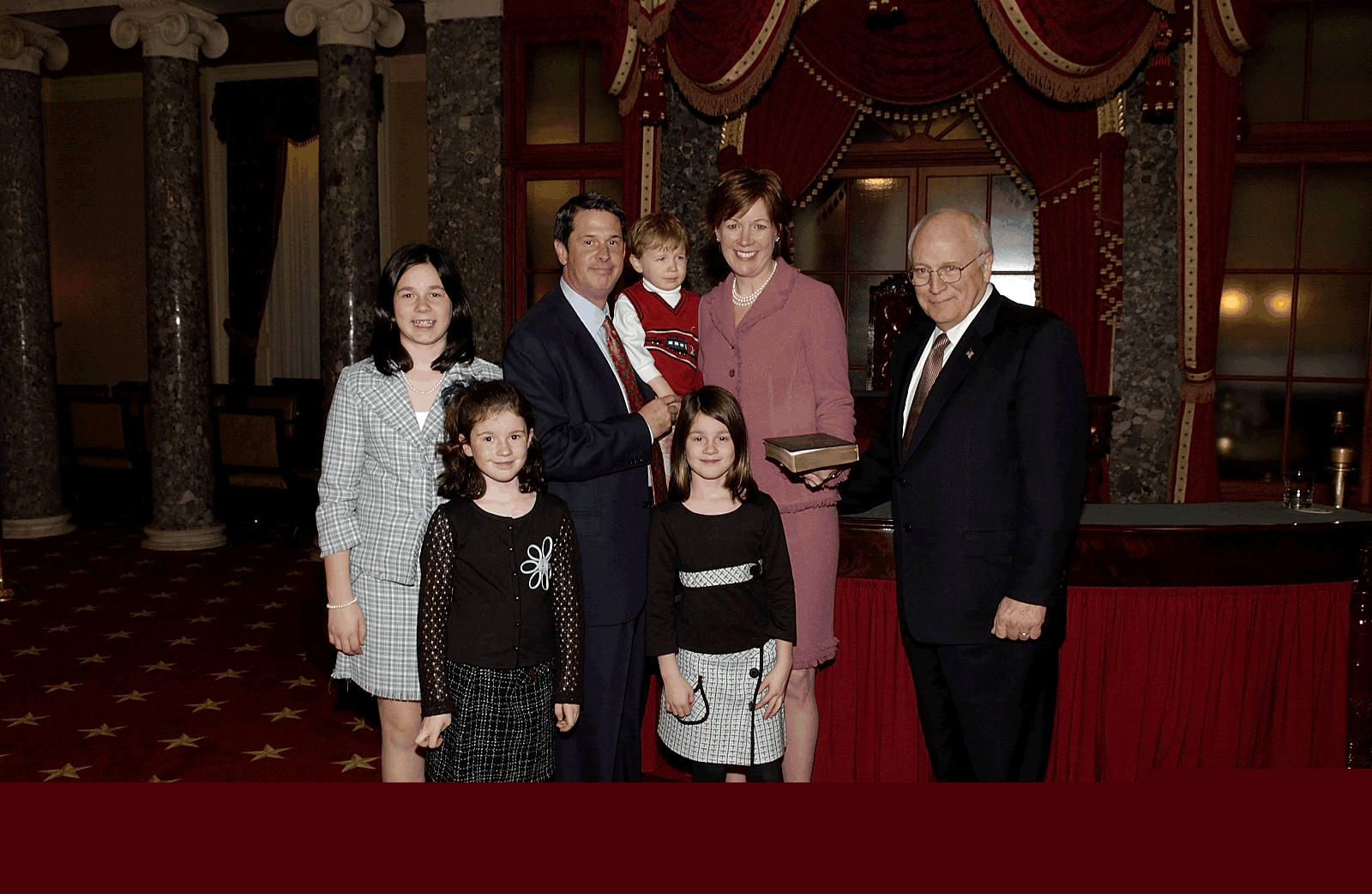
David Vitter and his family with Vice President Dick Cheney

David Bruce Vitter was born on May 3, 1961, in New Orleans, Louisiana. He is the son of Audrey Malvina (née St. Raymond) and Albert Leopold Vitter. Vitter graduated in 1979 from De La Salle High School in New Orleans. While a student at De La Salle, Vitter participated in the Close Up Washington civic education program. He received a Bachelor of Arts from Harvard College in 1983; a second B.A. from Magdalen College, Oxford in 1985, as a Rhodes Scholar; and a Juris Doctor degree in 1988 from the Tulane University Law School in New Orleans. He was a practicing lawyer, and adjunct law professor at Tulane and Loyola University New Orleans.

Vitter and his wife Wendy, a former prosecutor, have four children. Vitter's brother Jeffrey is a computer scientist who served as chancellor of the University of Mississippi from January 2016 to January 2019.

== Early political career ==
=== Louisiana House of Representatives ===
Vitter was a member of the Louisiana House of Representatives from 1992 to 1999.

Vitter has argued for ethics reform and term limits since he was in the Louisiana Legislature in the early 1990s. As a Louisiana state legislator, Vitter successfully pushed through a term limits amendment to the state constitution to oust the largely Democratic legislature. The first election legislators affected by the reform occurred in 2007. In order to leverage the term limits advantage in that election, Vitter formed a Political Action Committee with the goal of winning a legislative Republican majority. While the Republicans saw gains, the Democrats maintained majority control.

Vitter opposed gambling during his tenure in the Louisiana House.

=== United States House of Representatives ===
Vitter won a special election to Louisiana's 1st congressional district in 1999, succeeding Republican U.S. Representative Bob Livingston, who resigned after disclosure that he had committed adultery. In the initial vote on May 1, 1999, former Congressman and Governor David C. Treen finished first with 36,719 votes (25 percent). Vitter was second, with 31,741 (22 percent), and white nationalist David Duke finished third with 28,055 votes (19 percent). Monica L. Monica, a Republican ophthalmologist, had 16 percent; State Representative Bill Strain, a conservative Democrat, finished fifth with 11 percent; and Rob Couhig, a Republican lawyer and the owner of New Orleans's minor league baseball team, garnered 6 percent. In the runoff, Vitter defeated Treen 51–49 percent.

In 2000 and 2002, Vitter was re-elected with more than 80 percent of the vote in what had become a safe Republican district.

In 2001, Vitter co-authored legislation to restrict the number of physicians allowed to prescribe RU-486, a drug used in medical abortions. The bill died in committee.

In 2003, Vitter proposed to amend the U.S. Constitution to ban same-sex marriage. In 2004, he said, "This is a real outrage. The Hollywood left is redefining the most basic institution in human history...We need a U.S. Senator who will stand up for Louisiana values, not Massachusetts values."

=== 2003 gubernatorial election ===
In 2002, Vitter was preparing to run for governor in 2003, with the incumbent, Republican Mike Foster, prevented by term limits from running again. But in June 2002, shortly before the Louisiana Weekly reported on a claim from Vincent Bruno, a campaign worker for Treen in 1999, about Vitter's alleged relationship with a prostitute, Vitter dropped out of the governor's race, saying he and his wife were dealing with marital problems.

Bruno said on a New Orleans–based radio show that he had been told by a prostitute that she had interactions with Vitter. However, Treen and his campaign decided to not publicize this information during the election.

== United States Senate ==
=== 2004 election ===
In 2004, Vitter ran to replace Democrat John Breaux in the United States Senate.

During the campaign, Vitter was accused by a member of the Louisiana Republican State Central Committee of having had a lengthy affair with a prostitute in New Orleans. Vitter responded that the allegation was "absolutely and completely untrue" and that it was "just crass Louisiana politics."

On November 2, 2004, Vitter won the jungle primary, garnering a majority of the vote, while the rest of the vote was mostly split among the Democratic contenders.

Vitter was the first Republican in Louisiana to be popularly elected as a U.S. Senator. The previous Republican Senator, William Pitt Kellogg, was chosen by the state legislature in 1876, in accordance with the process used before the Seventeenth Amendment to the U.S. Constitution went into effect in 1914.

=== 2010 election ===
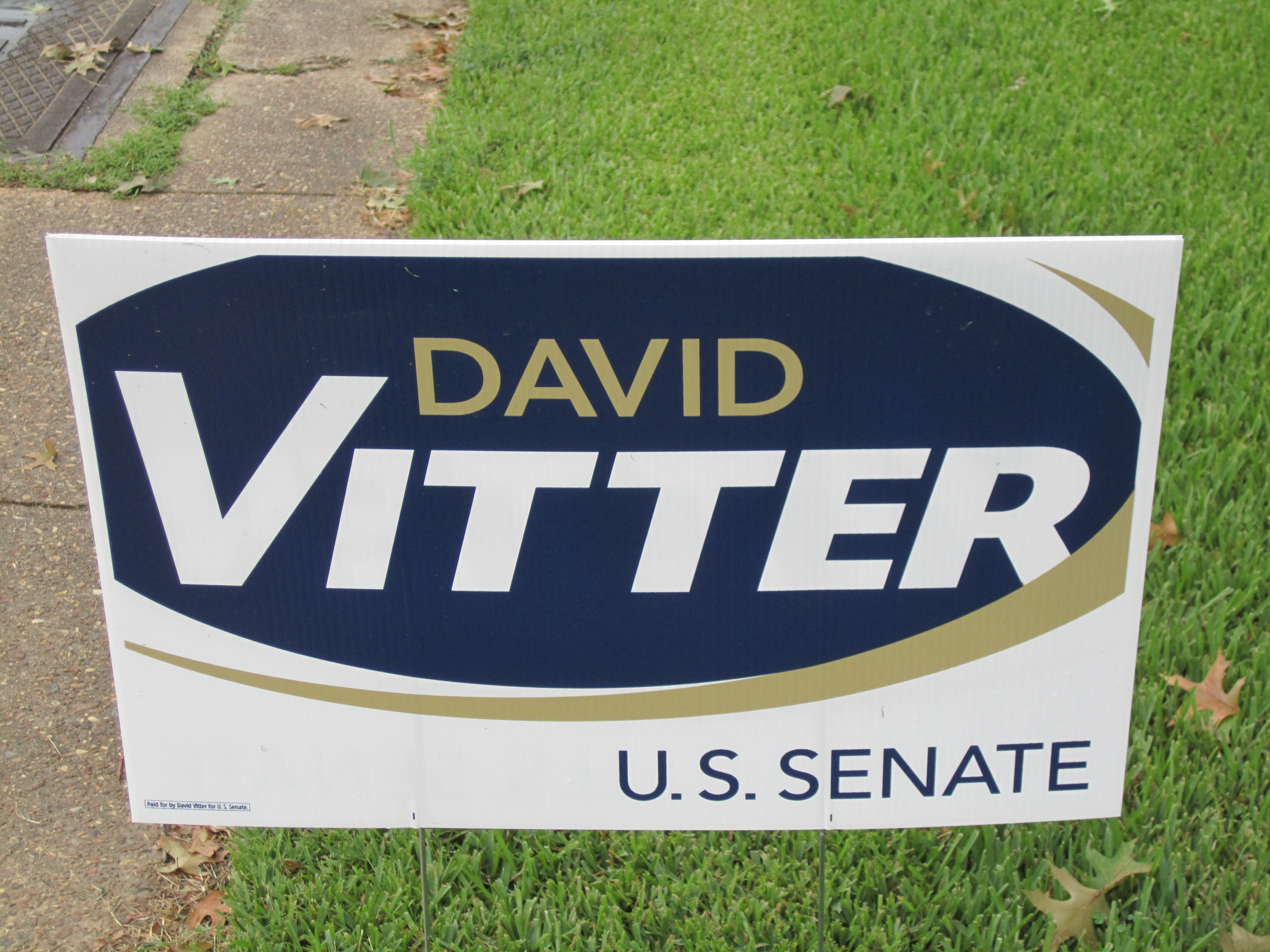
Vitter yard sign (2010)

Vitter began fundraising for his 2010 reelection run in December 2008. He raised $731,000 in the first quarter of 2009 and $2.5 million for his 2010 campaign. He had wide leads against potential Democratic opponents in aggregate general election polling. He faced intraparty opposition from Chet D. Traylor of Monroe, a former associate justice of the Louisiana Supreme Court, in the August 28 Republican primary election and defeated him.

He faced the Democratic U.S. Representative Charlie Melançon of Napoleonville in the November 2 general election. State Representative Ernest Wooton of Belle Chasse in Plaquemines Parish, an Independent, also ran. On November 4, 2010, Vitter was re-elected as Louisiana Senator, defeating his Democratic rival, Melancon. Vitter got 715,304 votes while Melancon got 476,423 votes. Vitter received about 57% of the total vote while Melancon got 38%. The Independent candidate Wooton finished with 8,167 votes, or 1 percent of the total cast.

=== Tenure ===
Vitter identified himself as a political conservative throughout his political career. His legislative agenda included support for Second Amendment rights and opposition to abortion, federal funding for abortion providers, gambling, same-sex marriage, civil unions, increases in the State Children's Health Insurance Program, the United Nations, and amnesty for America's illegal immigrants. Vitter's stated positions include support for a balanced budget constitutional amendment, abolition of federal and state estate taxes, increased numbers of local police, and an assortment of health care, tax and national defense reforms.

After conceding defeat to John Bel Edwards in the 2015 Louisiana gubernatorial election, Vitter announced that he would not seek reelection to his Senate seat in 2016 and would retire from office at the completion of his term.

In 2016, Vitter succeeded after a five-year battle in passing through the Senate landmark legislation to reform the country's chemical safety laws. Vitter called the legislation a "big accomplishment. This is an area of federal law that everybody, every stakeholder, every group, whether it's some far-left environmental group or industry, said needed to be updated. The trick was getting agreement on doing that."

==== Abortion ====
In October 2007, Vitter introduced an amendment barring all federal public funds to health care providers and Planned Parenthood that provide services that include abortion. Federal law bars any funding to directly finance elective abortions in accordance with the Hyde amendment. Vitter argued that the funds are used for overhead costs that benefit the abortion services. The amendment failed to pass. Following the rejection, Vitter and others urged the Senate to pass a similar bill introduced by Vitter in January 2007. The bill failed to pass.

In January 2008, Vitter proposed an amendment to prohibit the funding of abortions with Indian Health Service funds except in the case of rape, incest, or when the life of the woman is at risk. The amendment would have held future presidential administrations to an executive principle first crafted in 1982 by the Ronald Reagan White House. Vitter's amendment passed the Senate but later was stalled in the House.

Later that year, Vitter co-sponsored the Pregnant Women Health and Safety Act which – along with other oversight regulations – required doctors performing abortions to have the authority granted by a nearby hospital to admit patients. The bill was never reported to committee.

==== Abstinence education ====
Vitter advocated abstinence-only sex education, emphasizing abstinence over sex education that includes information about birth control, drawing criticism from Planned Parenthood. He said, "Abstinence education is a public health strategy focused on risk avoidance that aims to help young people avoid exposure to harm...by teaching teenagers that saving sex until marriage and remaining faithful afterwards is the best choice for health and happiness."

==== Automotive industry bailout ====
Vitter was one of 35 Senators to vote against the Big 3 Bailout bill. The financial bailout package was for GM, Chrysler, and Ford, but failed to pass on December 11, 2008. During the Senate debate Vitter referred to the approach of giving the automotive industry a financial package before they restructured as "ass-backwards". He soon apologized for the phrasing of the comment, which did not appear in the Congressional Record.

==== BP Horizon oil spill ====
In response to the April 2010 Deepwater Horizon oil spill at an offshore drilling rig in the Gulf of Mexico threatening the coast of Louisiana, Vitter introduced legislation along with Jeff Sessions of Alabama to increase the liability cap of an oil company from $75 million to its most recent annual profits (or $150 million if greater). In the case of BP, the owner of the oil lease, its liability would be $20 billion. Vitter later introduced an amendment that would remove the cap entirely for this particular spill. Competing Democratic proposals would have raised the liability to $10 billion regardless of profits or removed the cap altogether. Sessions argued that large caps unrelated to company profits would harm smaller companies.

==== Chemical safety ====
In May 2013, Vitter introduced the Chemical Safety Improvement Act, a bipartisan bill to reform the Toxic Substances Control Act, which would have regulated the introduction of new or already existing chemicals. The bill would have given additional authority to the Environmental Protection Agency to regulate chemicals and streamline the patchwork of state laws on chemicals under federal authority.

==== Child protection ====
In April 2008, Vitter introduced an amendment to continue funding the Adam Walsh Child Protection and Safety Act which was excluded from the 2008/2009 budget. The federal program maintains a national sex offender registry, provides resources for tracking down unregistered sex offenders and increases penalties for the sexual assault of children. His amendment received bipartisan support.

==== Children's health insurance program ====
In September 2007, Vitter opposed an increase of $35 billion for the State Children's Health Insurance Program (SCHIP), the national program to provide health care for children from families who earn too much to qualify for Medicaid but cannot afford private health insurance. He said he preferred that private health insurance provide the needed care and deemed the bill as "Hillarycare", a reference to the 1993 Clinton health care plan created by Hillary Clinton which proposed universal health care.

==== Ethics and term limits ====
Vitter refused to pledge to a voluntary term limit when running for the U.S. Congress in 1999. His opponent characterized this stance as hypocritical, and Vitter countered that unless it were universally applied, the loss of seniority would disadvantage his district. As a Senator, he has proposed term limit constitutional amendments for members of Congress three times. Vitter eventually decided to retire from the Senate in 2016 after serving two terms.

In 2007, in response to lobbying scandals involving, among others, Jack Abramoff and Duke Cunningham, Congress passed a lobbying and ethics reform package to which Vitter proposed a package of five amendments. The Senate approved three that limited which legislators' spouses could lobby the Senate, created criminal penalties for legislators and executive branch officials who falsify financial reports, and doubled the penalties for lobbyists who failed to comply with disclosure requirements. The Senate rejected prohibiting legislators from paying their families with campaign funds with some saying it was unrelated to the current legislation and others that the payments were not a problem. Additionally, they tabled his proposal to define Indian tribes as corporations and its members as shareholders so that they are required to contribute to candidates through political action committees instead of their tribal treasury. Senators objected saying that they are already subjected to campaign laws for unincorporated entities and individuals and that the proposal was singling them out unfairly. The reform package became law in September 2007.

In 2009, Vitter and Democratic former Senator Russ Feingold announced an effort to end automatic pay raises for members of Congress.

==== Franken Amendment ====
In October 2009, the Senate passed Democratic Senator Al Franken's amendment to the 2010 Defense Appropriations bill that would forbid federal contractors from forcing victims of sexual assault, battery and discrimination to submit to binding arbitration (where a third-party typically chosen by the contractor adjudicates) and thereby prohibiting them from going to court. The impetus for the amendment came from the story of Jamie Leigh Jones who alleged that she was drugged and gang-raped by employees of Halliburton/KBR, a federal contractor.

The amendment passed 68 to 30 with all opposition coming from Republicans including Vitter (all four female Republicans, six other Republicans and all present Democrats voted for passage). Vitter's 2010 Democratic Senatorial opponent Charlie Melancon criticized Vitter for his vote saying, "David Vitter has refused to explain why he voted to allow taxpayer-funded companies to sweep rape charges under the rug. We can only guess what his reasons were." However, The Washington Post conservative columnist Kathleen Parker argued that the 30 senators were being "unfairly smeared for doing the harder thing, maybe even for the right reasons."

Republican senators said they voted against it because it was unenforceable, a position also taken by the Department of Defense (DOD) and the Obama administration. However, the DOD and the White House stated they agreed with the intent of the legislation and suggested it would be better if it was broadened to prohibit the use of arbitration in cases of sexual assault for any business contract, not just federal contractors. Senators explained their vote against the legislation by saying it was a political attack on Halliburton and that the Senate shouldn't regulate contracts. The latter argument is countered with many examples of similar restrictions on contractors such as discrimination, bonuses and health care. Others felt it was unconstitutional and that arbitration is useful in resolving disputes, often faster, privately and cheaper.

Later, a Baton Rouge rape survivor confronted Vitter at a town hall meeting saying, "[it] meant everything to me that I was able to put the person who attacked me behind bars ... How can you support a law that tells a rape victim that she does not have the right to defend herself?" Vitter replied, "The language in question did not say that in any way shape or form."

==== Gambling ====
Vitter opposed a bid by the Jena Band of Choctaw Indians to build a casino in Louisiana, arguing that the build site was not historically part of their tribal lands. He lobbied the Interior Department and included language in an appropriations bill to stop the casino. Although the Interior Department gave its approval, the casino has not yet been approved by the state. The Jena chief accused Vitter of ties with disgraced lobbyist Jack Abramoff, who simultaneously lobbied against the casino. The chairman of the Senate committee investigating the lobbyist said, "The committee has seen absolutely no evidence whatsoever that Senator Vitter's opposition to (the proposed casino) had to do with anything other than his long-standing opposition to gambling." In 2007 and 2008, Vitter introduced a bill to prohibit Indian casinos such as Jena's. Neither bill became law.

==== Gun rights ====
Given an "A" grade by the NRA Political Victory Fund, Vitter has been a consistent defender of gun rights. In April 2006, in response to firearm confiscations in the aftermath of Hurricane Katrina, Vitter was the Senate sponsor of the Disaster Recovery Personal Protection Act, to prohibit federal funding for the confiscation of legally held firearms during a disaster. Later, Vitter included the provisions of the act in an amendment to an appropriation bill for the Department Of Homeland Security. The bill became law in September 2006, with the amendment modified to allow for the temporary surrender of a firearm as a condition for entering a rescue or evacuation vehicle.

On April 17, 2013, Vitter voted against the Toomey-Manchin Gun Control Amendment. The amendment failed to reach the sixty senatorial votes necessary to overcome a Republican-led filibuster. The Toomey-Manchin Gun Control Amendment is a bipartisan deal on gun background checks. Under the proposal, federal background checks would be expanded to include gun shows and online sales. All such sales would be channeled through licensed firearm dealers who would be charged for keeping record of transactions. The proposal does not require background checks for private sales between individuals.

In February 2008, Vitter – along with Senators Larry Craig and Mike Crapo of Idaho – blocked the confirmation of Michael J. Sullivan as head of the Bureau of Alcohol, Tobacco, Firearms, and Explosives (ATF) saying Sullivan supports "burdensome regulations" on gun owners and dealers and is "overly aggressive" enforcing gun laws. An editorial writer for The Boston Globe wrote that Vitter's position was "unreasonable" because the guns Sullivan sought to control are those commonly used in crimes: those stolen or purchased on the black market. On the other hand, gun rights advocates say that many gun dealers have lost their licenses for harmless bureaucratic errors. Sullivan stayed on as acting head of the ATF until January 2009 to make way for President Barack Obama to name his own nominee.

==== Hurricane Katrina ====
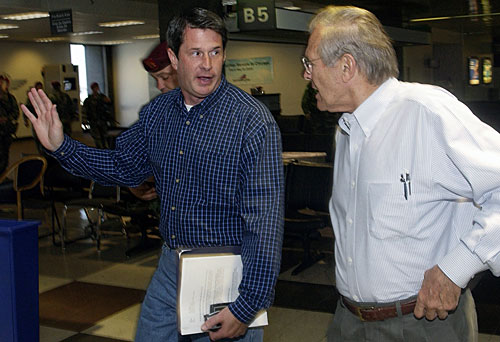
Senator Vitter discussing relief efforts with Defense Secretary Donald Rumsfeld

In the aftermath of Hurricane Katrina, Vitter and the rest of the Louisiana congressional delegation worked to bring aid to the Gulf Coast region to rebuild broken levees, schools and hospitals, restore coastal wetlands, and provide assistance for its many victims.

In early September, Vitter said that he would give "the entire big government organized relief effort a failing grade, across the board." He said that state and local governments shared in the blame as well. Vitter's actions during Hurricane Katrina are described in historian Douglas Brinkley's May 2006 book, The Great Deluge.

In September 2007, Vitter announced that he got "a critical concession" from the White House that decreased Louisiana's obligations for hurricane recovery by $1 billion. However, the White House said that was false.

==== Immigration ====
Vitter has been actively involved with legislation concerning illegal immigrants. In June 2007, he led a group of conservative Senators in blocking the Comprehensive Immigration Reform Act, a piece of federal legislation that would have granted a pathway to legal residence to 12 million illegal immigrants coupled with increased border enforcement. The bill's defeat won Vitter national attention as the bill was supported by President George W. Bush, John McCain, and Ted Kennedy, among others. Vitter characterized the bill as amnesty, which supporters denied. Bush accused the bill's opponents of fear mongering.

In October 2007, Vitter introduced an amendment withholding Community Oriented Policing Services funds from any sanctuary city which bans city employees and police officers from asking people about their immigration status in violation of the Illegal Immigration Act. Democratic Senator Dick Durbin, in opposition to the amendment, said these cities do not want to inquire about someone's status if they report a crime, are a victim of domestic violence or get vaccinations for their children. The amendment was defeated.

In November 2007, Vitter introduced a bill requiring banks to verify that no customer was an illegal immigrant before issuing banking or credit cards. The bill never made it out of committee.

In March 2008, Vitter reintroduced the latter two proposals and cosponsored ten of eleven other bills in a Republican package of tough immigration enforcement measures including jail time for illegal border crossing; deportation for any immigrant (legal or illegal) for a single driving while intoxicated; declaration of English as the official language (thereby terminating language assistance at voting booths and federal agencies); additional construction of a border fence; permission for local and state police to enforce immigration laws and penalties for states who issue drivers licenses to illegals. None of these proposals passed, partially because the Democratic-controlled Senate preferred a comprehensive approach which would include a guest-worker program and a path to citizenship for the current population more akin to the package defeated by Vitter in 2007.

In April 2008, Vitter introduced a joint resolution proposing a constitutional amendment that a child born in the United States is not a citizen unless a parent is a citizen, lawful permanent resident, or alien serving in the military. Currently the Constitution grants citizenship to children born within the U.S. regardless of the legal status of the parents. The bill never made it out of the Democratic-led committee.

==== Louisiana Family Forum earmark ====
In September 2007, Vitter earmarked $100,000 in federal money for a Christian group, the Louisiana Family Forum, known for challenging evolution by means of "teaching the controversy" which promotes intelligent design. According to Vitter, the earmark was "to develop a plan to promote better science education". The Times-Picayune alleged the group had close ties with Vitter. However, they have criticized Vitter for his support of Rudy Giuliani.

On October 17, 2007, the liberal organization People For the American Way, along with several other groups asked the Senate to remove the earmark. Vitter later withdrew it.

==== Military ====
In May 2008, Vitter voted with the majority, despite the opposition of Bush and other Republicans, for the passage of the Post-9/11 Veterans Educational Assistance Act of 2008 to expand educational benefits for veterans similar to the level provided for returning World War II veterans in the G.I. Bill.

==== Network neutrality ====
Vitter was one of six senate Republicans to propose an amendment to a bill which would stop the Federal Communications Commission (FCC) from enforcing network neutrality which they allege is a violation of the First Amendment.

==== New Orleans public housing ====
In September 2007, The Times-Picayune reported that Vitter and the Bush administration opposed a provision of The Gulf Coast Housing Recovery bill which required that every public housing apartment torn down be replaced with another form of low-income housing on a one-for-one basis. The administration testified that there was not sufficient demand for public housing units, a position contested by several senators. Vitter stated it would recreate "housing projects exactly as they were", isolated and riddled with crime. However, Mary Landrieu, the Louisiana Democratic Senator, said the intent was to make certain there were affordable places for working-class people who returned. The bill requires that demolished housing projects be replaced with mixed income communities which local housing advocates say is different from the massive public housing developments that Vitter is referring to. However, the bill does not include a ban on large-scale projects. The city housing authority is planning on replacing 4,000 low-income units with mixed-income projects providing a smaller inventory of low-income units. In December 2007, Vitter prevented the bill from leaving the committee.

==== Obama nominations ====
Vitter and Jim DeMint were the only two Senators that voted against Hillary Clinton's confirmation for the position of Secretary of State under the new Obama administration, on January 21, 2009.

He blocked President Obama's nominee for the new Federal Emergency Management Agency (FEMA) administrator until he received a written commitment on flood control issues from the nominee and FEMA. The New York Times, along with some Republican Senators, criticized Vitter for what it characterized as political posturing, given that the hurricane season was quickly approaching. He lifted his hold on May 12, 2009.

==== Affordable Care Act ====
Vitter opposed President Barack Obama's health reform legislation; he voted against the Affordable Care Act in December 2009, and he voted against the Health Care and Education Reconciliation Act of 2010.

==== Same-sex marriage ====
Vitter opposes both same-sex marriage and civil unions. In June 2006, he said "I don't believe there's any issue that's more important than this one ... I think this debate is very healthy, and it's winning a lot of hearts and minds. I think we're going to show real progress." In 2006, he told The Times-Picayune, "I'm a conservative who opposes radically redefining marriage, the most important social institution in human history."

In October 2005, at a Lafayette Parish Republican Executive Committee luncheon, Vitter compared gay marriage to hurricanes Katrina and Rita, which came through the same geographical areas. Vitter said "It's the crossroads where Katrina meets Rita. I always knew I was against same-sex unions."

==== School board prayer ====
In 2005 Vitter introduced a resolution supporting prayer at school board meetings in response to an earlier district court decision that the Louisiana's Tangipahoa Parish practice of opening meetings with Christian prayers was unconstitutional. The bill died in committee after receiving little support from colleagues on both sides of the aisle. Vitter later reintroduced the resolution in January 2007 after a panel of the Fifth Circuit Court concluded that Christian prayers were unconstitutional but was undecided whether nonsectarian prayers were allowed. In July 2007, the full Fifth Circuit dismissed the case because of a lack of standing. The school board subsequently resumed prayer evocations but opened it to diverse community religions. Vitter's bill died in committee.

==== Tea Party movement ====
In recognition of the Tea Party protests opposing President Barack Obama's policies, Vitter proposed Senate Resolution 98, which would designate April 15 in years both 2009 and 2010 as "National TEA Party Day". As of April 2009, the bill had no cosponsors and was referred to the Committee on the Judiciary with no further action.

In September 2010, Vitter signed a candidate pledge from the North Central Louisiana TEA Party Patriots. It included a promise to "Conduct myself personally and professionally in a moral and socially appropriate manner."

==== United Nations Convention on the Law of the Sea ====
In September 2007, during hearings of the Senate Foreign Relations Committee, Vitter expressed serious doubts about the United Nations Convention on the Law of the Sea treaty concerning issues of U.S. sovereignty echoing an array of conservative groups against the treaty including the National Center for Public Policy Research, The Heritage Foundation and the Center for Security Policy. The treaty, which sets up countries' jurisdiction over their coasts and ocean including exploration and navigation rights, was supported by the Bush administration, a majority of the United States Senate, the Pentagon, the State Department and Navy as do a coalition of business and environmental groups. The committee approved the treaty 17–4, with Vitter voting no.

==== Water Resources and Development Act ====
Vitter helped write the Water Resources and Development Act for flood-control, hurricane-protection and coastal-restoration projects including $3.6 billion for Louisiana. He called it the "single most important" legislation for assisting Louisiana with its recovery from hurricane Katrina. President George W. Bush vetoed the act, objecting to its cost. Congress overrode his veto, enacting the bill.

=== Committee assignments ===
- Committee on Banking, Housing, and Urban Affairs
  - Subcommittee on Housing, Transportation, and Community Development
  - Subcommittee on Financial Institutions and Consumer Protection
  - Subcommittee on Securities, Insurance, and Investment
- Committee on Environment and Public Works
  - Subcommittee on Clean Air and Nuclear Safety
  - Subcommittee on Oversight
  - Subcommittee on Transportation and Infrastructure (Chairman)
- Committee on the Judiciary
  - Subcommittee on Crime and Terrorism
  - Subcommittee on Immigration and The National Interest
  - Subcommittee on Oversight, Agency Action, Federal Rights and Federal Courts
  - Subcommittee on the Constitution
- Committee on Small Business and Entrepreneurship (Chairman)

== 2007 prostitution scandal ==
In early July 2007, Vitter's phone number was included in a published list of phone records of Pamela Martin and Associates, a company owned and run by Deborah Jeane Palfrey (also known as the "D.C. Madam"). In 2008, Palfrey was convicted by the U.S. government for running a prostitution service. Hustler identified the phone number and contacted Vitter's office to ask about his connection to Palfrey. The following day, Vitter issued a written statement in which he took responsibility for his "sin" and asked for forgiveness. On July 16, 2007, after a week of self-imposed seclusion, Vitter emerged and called a news conference. As his wife stood next to him, Vitter asked the public for forgiveness. Following Vitter's remarks, his wife Wendy Vitter spoke, but both refused to answer any questions. In 2004, Vitter had denied allegations that he had patronized prostitutes.

While the Louisiana state Republican Party offered guarded support, national Republicans offered forgiveness. The Nation predicted that the Republican Party would be in a "forgiving mood" because if Vitter resigned, Governor of Louisiana Kathleen Blanco, a Democrat, would likely appoint a Democrat to take his place until a special election could be held; such an action would have increased Democratic control over the US Senate.

On September 8, 2015, reporter Derek Myers was fired from WVLA-TV after asking Vitter, who was running for governor, about allegations that the senator had frequented prostitutes. After Myers's question, Myers said an unnamed coworker overheard a conversation about the Vitter campaign's ad spending at the station, possibly with a threat from the campaign to pull the ads. Democrat John Bel Edwards released an ad about the prostitution scandal two weeks before the run-off election and won by more than 12%.

== 2015 gubernatorial election ==
Vitter announced on January 21, 2014, that he would run for governor of Louisiana in the 2015 election. Then-Governor Bobby Jindal was ineligible to seek re-election due to term limits. Vitter was the first sitting or ex-U.S. Senator to launch a gubernatorial bid in Louisiana since 1904, when Democrat Newton Blanchard was elected. Vitter's major Republican opponents were Louisiana Public Service Commissioner and former lieutenant governor Scott Angelle and Lieutenant Governor Jay Dardenne. His Democratic opponent was John Bel Edwards, the Minority Leader of the Louisiana House of Representatives.

In the November 21 runoff election, Edwards defeated Vitter by a margin of 56% to 44%.

== Post-Senate career ==
After his Senate term ended, Vitter joined the Washington, D.C. lobbying firm Mercury LLC. As of October 2019, Vitter had lobbied for sanctioned Chinese surveillance company Hikvision as well as for the Libyan Government of National Accord and the Zimbabwean Ministry of Foreign Affairs and International Trade. He also lobbied for the sanctioned Russian bank Sovcombank.

== Electoral history ==
2015 Louisiana gubernatorial election

Blanket primary
Party	Candidate	Votes	%
Democratic	John Bel Edwards	444,517	39.89%
Republican	David Vitter	256,300	23.00%
Republican	Scott Angelle	214,982	19.29%
Republican	Jay Dardenne	166,656	14.96%
Democratic	Cary Deaton	11,763	1.06%
Democratic	S. L. Simpson	7,420	0.67%
No party	Beryl Billiot	5,694	0.51%
Other	Jeremy Odom	4,756	0.43%
Other	Eric Paul Orgeron	2,248	0.20%
Total		1,114,336	100%
Runoff
Party	Candidate	Votes	%
Democratic	John Bel Edwards	646,924	56.1%
Republican	David Vitter	505,940	43.9%
Total		1,152,864	100%
Democratic gain from Republican			

2010 Louisiana United States Senatorial Election

Party	Candidate	Votes	%
Republican	David Vitter (inc.)	715,304	56.56%
Democratic	Charlie Melancon	476,423	37.67%
Libertarian	Randall Hayes	13,952	1.10%
No party	Michael Brown	9,970	0.79%
Other	Mike Spears	9,188	0.73%
Other	Ernest Wooton	8,164	0.65%
No party	Skip Galan	7,471	0.59%
Reform	William McShan	5,879	0.46%
Other	Bob Lang	5,732	0.45%
No party	Milton Gordon	4,806	0.38%
Other	Tommy LaFargue	4,042	0.32%
No party	Sam Melton	3,779	0.30%
Total		1,264,710	100%
Republican hold			

2004 Louisiana United States Senatorial Election

Party	Candidate	Votes	%
Republican	David Vitter	943,014	51.03%
Democratic	Chris John	542,150	29.34%
Democratic	John Neely Kennedy	275,821	14.92%
Democratic	Arthur A. Morrell	47,222	2.56%
Other	Richard M. Fontanesi	15,097	0.82%
Other	R. A. "Skip" Galan	12,463	0.67%
Democratic	Sam Houston Melton, Jr.	12,289	0.66%
Total		1,848,056	100%
Republican gain from Democratic			

1999 Louisiana 1st District United States Congressional Election

Blanket primary
Party	Candidate	Votes	%
Republican	David C. Treen	36,719	25.06%
Republican	David Vitter	31,741	21.67%
Republican	David Duke	28,059	19.15%
Republican	Monica Monica	22,928	15.65%
Democratic	Bill Strain	16,446	11.23%
Republican	Rob Couhig	9,295	6.34%
Democratic	Darryl P. Ward	720	0.49%
Republican	Patrick E. Landry	344	0.23%
Republican	S. J. LoCoco	246	0.17%
Total		146,498	100%
Runoff
Party	Candidate	Votes	%
Republican	David Vitter	61,661	50.75%
Republican	David C. Treen	59,849	49.25%
Total		121,510	100%
Republican hold			

1995 Louisiana 81st District State House of Representatives Election

Party	Candidate	%
Republican	David Vitter (inc.)	100%
Total		100%
Republican hold		

1991 Louisiana 81st District State House of Representatives Election

Party	Candidate	%
Republican	David Vitter	68%
Republican	Mike Reynolds	24%
Republican	Mercedes Hernandez	8%
Total		100%
Republican hold		

== See also ==
- List of federal political sex scandals in the United States

== Footnotes ==
U.S. House of Representatives
Preceded by Bob Livingston	Member of the U.S. House of Representatives from Louisiana's 1st congressional district 1999–2005	Succeeded by Bobby Jindal
Party political offices
Preceded by Jim Donelon	Republican nominee for U.S. Senator from Louisiana (Class 3); 2004, 2010	Succeeded by John Neely Kennedy
Preceded by Bobby Jindal	Republican nominee for Governor of Louisiana; 2015	Succeeded by Eddie Rispone
U.S. Senate
Preceded by John Breaux	U.S. Senator (Class 3) from Louisiana; 2005–2017; Served alongside: Mary Landrieu, Bill Cassidy	Succeeded by John Neely Kennedy
Preceded by Jim Inhofe	Ranking Member of the Senate Environment Committee; 2013–2015	Succeeded by Barbara Boxer
Preceded by Maria Cantwell	Chair of the Senate Small Business Committee; 2015–2017	Succeeded by Jim Risch
U.S. order of precedence (ceremonial)
Preceded by Rob Portman as Former U.S. Senator	Order of precedence of the United States as Former U.S. Senator	Succeeded by Evan Bayh as Former U.S. Senator
