= 2008 United States Senate election in Louisiana =

- November 4, 2008
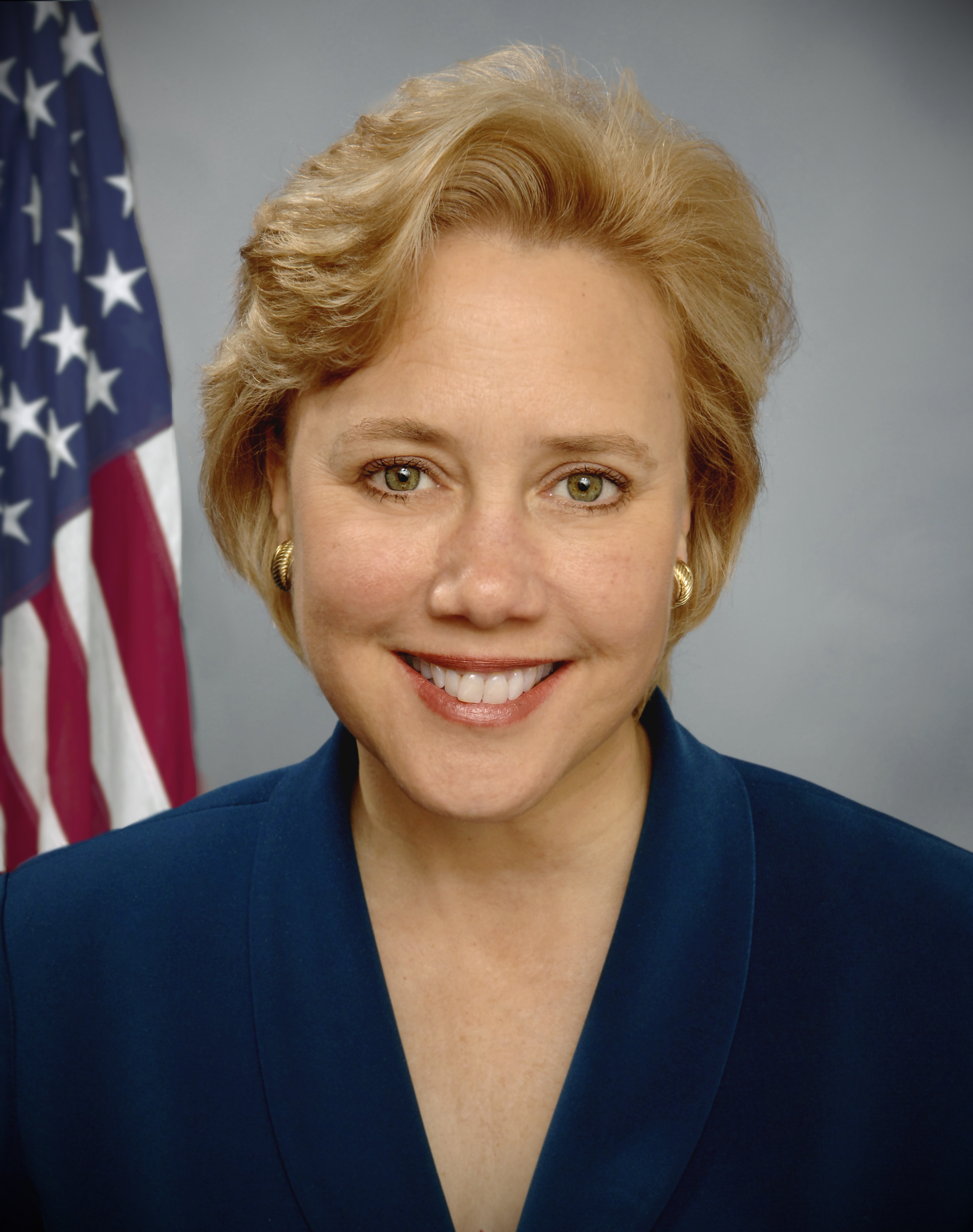

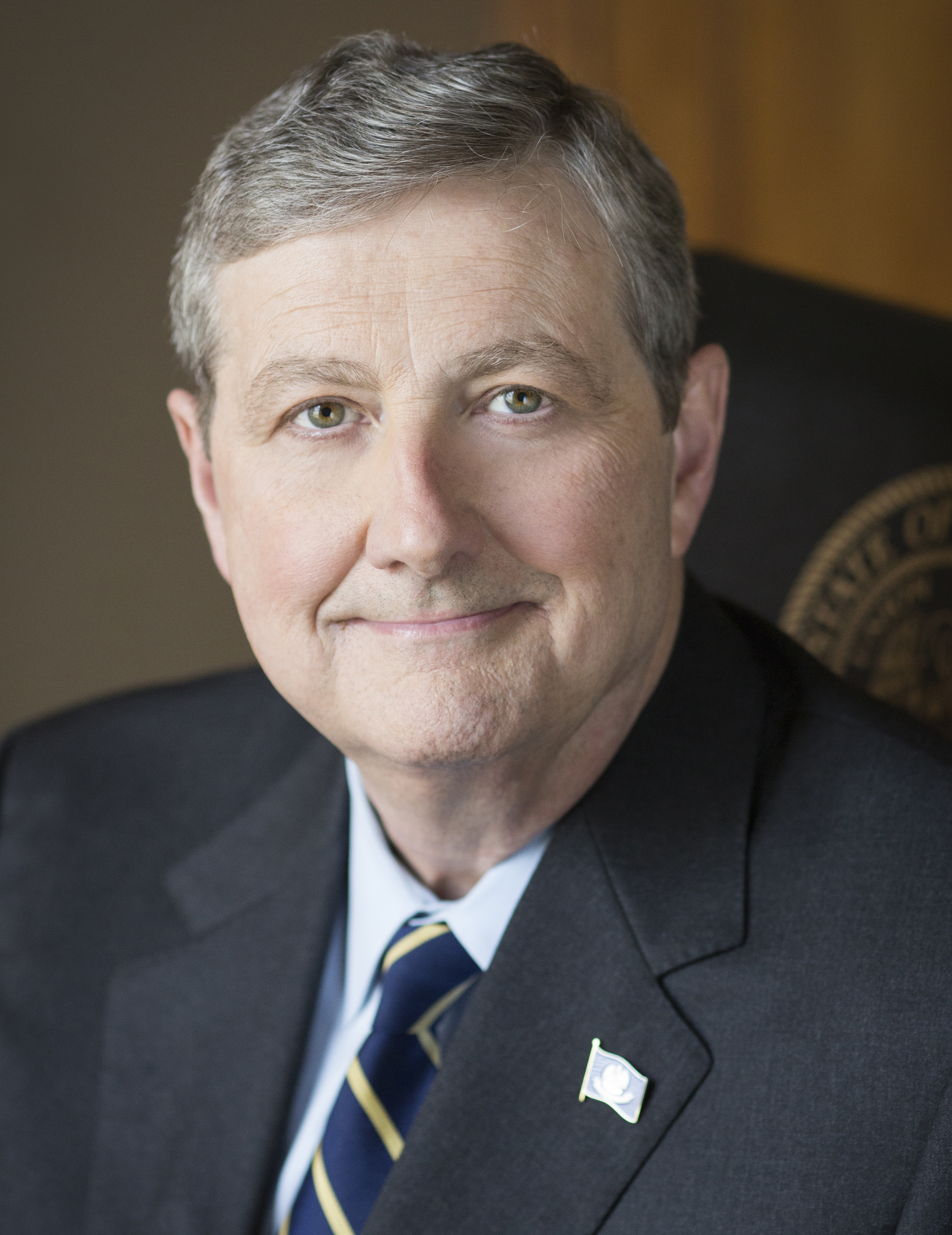
Nominee	Mary Landrieu	John Kennedy
Party	Democratic	Republican
Popular vote	988,298	867,177
Percentage	52.11%	45.72%
- Landrieu: 40–50% 50–60% 60–70% 70–80% 80–90% >90% Kennedy: 40–50% 50–60% 60–70% 70–80% 80–90% >90% Tie: 40–50% 50%
U.S. senator before election
Mary Landrieu
Democratic
Elected U.S. Senator
Mary Landrieu
Democratic

The 2008 United States Senate election in Louisiana was held on November 4, 2008. This was the first time since the 1970s that Louisiana used party primaries for federal races. Incumbent Senator Mary Landrieu won a third term by 6.4 percent, despite being forecast as one of the most vulnerable Senate Democrats during 2008. She had received praise and wide publicity for her advocacy after Hurricane Katrina, particularly during hearings regarding FEMA's response to the disaster. As of 2026, this is the last time that Democrats won any statewide election in Louisiana other than governor.

Landrieu's main opponent John Kennedy garnered allegations of being a political opportunist after switching parties from Democrat to Republican in 2007. He has held the state's other U.S. Senate seat since 2017 as a Republican, having unsuccessfully run as a Democrat for it in 2004.

== Background ==
Landrieu's increased vulnerability was supposed to be the result of a significant drop in the state's African-American population after Hurricane Katrina, especially in Landrieu's home city of New Orleans. Louisiana also elected a Republican senator in 2004 and President Bush won the state twice, in 2004 with 56.72% of the vote. Also, Republican Bobby Jindal won the 2007 gubernatorial election with 54% of the vote.

== Major candidates ==
=== Democratic ===
- Mary Landrieu, incumbent U.S. senator

=== Republican ===
- John Neely Kennedy, state treasurer and Democratic candidate for the U.S. Senate in 2004

== General election ==
=== Predictions ===
Source	Ranking	As of
The Cook Political Report	Lean D	October 23, 2008
CQ Politics	Lean D	October 31, 2008
Rothenberg Political Report	Lean D	November 2, 2008
Real Clear Politics	Lean D	October 23, 2008

=== Polling ===
Poll source	Dates administered	Mary Landrieu (D)	John Kennedy (R)
Rasmussen Reports	October 21, 2008	53%	43%
Rasmussen Reports	September 25, 2008	54%	41%
Rasmussen Reports	August 17, 2008	56%	39%
Rasmussen Reports	July 9, 2008	49%	44%
Southern Media & Opinion Research	July 1, 2008	46%	40%
Rasmussen Reports	May 28, 2008	47%	44%
Southern Media & Opinion Research	March 26 – April 9, 2008	50%	38%
Survey USA	December 6–10, 2007	46%	42%

=== Results ===
Though she was considered one of the most vulnerable incumbent senators in 2008, Landrieu won reelection by a margin of 121,121 votes and 6.39%, overperforming Democratic presidential nominee Barack Obama in the state by more than 24 percentage points.

2008 United States Senate election in Louisiana
Party	Candidate	Votes	%	±%
Democratic	Mary Landrieu (incumbent)	988,298	52.11%	+0.41%
Republican	John Kennedy	867,177	45.72%	−2.58%
Libertarian	Richard Fontanesi	18,590	0.98%	n/a
Independent	Jay Patel	13,729	0.72%	n/a
Independent	Robert Stewart	8,780	0.46%	n/a
Majority		121,121	6.39%	+2.99
Turnout		1,896,574	100%	
Democratic hold		Swing		

Parishes that flipped from Democratic to Republican

- Catahoula (largest town: Jonesville)
- Jefferson Davis (largest city: Jennings)
- Vermilion (largest city: Abbeville)

Parishes that flipped from Republican to Democratic

- Iberia (largest city: New Iberia)
- Jefferson (largest town: Metairie)
- Lincoln (largest town: Ruston)
- Plaquemines (largest community: Belle Chasse)
- Saint Bernard (largest community: Chalmette)
- Saint Mary (largest city: Morgan City)

== See also ==
- 2008 United States Senate elections
