= John Stefanski =

American politician

Member of the Louisiana House of Representatives from the 42nd district
- Incumbent
- Assumed office April 10, 2017
- Preceded by: Jack Montoucet
- Succeeded by: Chance Keith Henry

Personal details
- Born: April 13, 1984 (age 42) Crowley, Louisiana, U.S.
- Party: Republican
- Education: Louisiana State University (BA); Loyola University New Orleans (JD)

John M. Stefanski (born April 13, 1984) is an American attorney and politician who had served as a member of the Louisiana House of Representatives since 2017 to 2024. He is a Republican.

== Education ==
Stefanski earned a Bachelor of Arts degree in history from Louisiana State University and a Juris Doctor from the Loyola University New Orleans College of Law.

== Professional career ==
From 2011 to 2017, Stefanki worked as an attorney with the 15th Judicial District Public Defender's Office. Stefanski was elected to the Louisiana House of Representatives in a March 25, 2017 special election and assumed office on April 10, 2017. In the 2021–2022 legislative session, Stefanski chaired the House and Governmental Affairs Committee. As chair of the committee, Stefanski managed redistricting after the 2020 United States census.

Stefanski is the co-owner and partner of Edwards, Stefanski, & Zaunbrecher, LLP law firm. He was a candidate for attorney general of Louisiana in 2023.

== Louisiana House of Representatives ==
On April 10, 2017, Stefanski was sworn in to represent House district 42, which encompasses portions of Lafayette and Acadia parishes.

Committee Assignments

- House and Governmental Affairs, Chairman
- Capitol Security Council
- Legislative Budgetary Control Council
- State Bond Commission
- House Select Leadership Committee

Caucuses & Delegations

- Acadiana Delegation
- Louisiana Republican Legislative Delegation
- Louisiana Rural Caucus

2020 First-Extraordinary Session

Civil Justice Reform Act

- House Bill 57, authored by Speaker Clay Schexnayder, created the Civil Justice Reform Act. Stefanski was tasked with handling house bill 57 for Speaker Schexnayder. The act lowers the monetary threshold for a jury trial from $50,000 to $10,000 for tort claims, reduces the amount of damages that can be awarded to a plaintiff (abrogating the collateral source rule in these instances), allows introduction of evidence of whether the plaintiff was wearing a seatbelt when the injury occurred, and prohibits the mention of the insurance company being sued. The Civil Justice Reform Act was passed and signed by Governor John Bel Edwards, making it the 37th Act signed into law of the 2020 first-extraordinary session.

2023 Regular Session

- House Bill 498, authored by Stefanski sets a bail minimum amount of $100,000 which would be set if a person is charged with a violent crime and set at $500,000 if charged with a violent crime with a firearm.

== Louisiana Attorney General campaign ==
In October 2022, Stefanski officially announced his bid to become Louisiana's 46th Attorney General, a position that became available after Attorney General Jeff Landry's announcement to run for Louisiana Governor. The first round of the election took place on October 14, 2023. He came in third place with 16.8% of the vote and was subsequently eliminated.
