= Chance Keith Henry =

American politician

Chance Henry

Member of the Louisiana House of Representatives from the 42nd district
- Incumbent
- Assumed office January 8, 2024
- Preceded by: John Stefanski

Personal details
- Party: Republican

Chance Keith Henry is an American politician serving as a member of the Louisiana House of Representatives from the 42nd district. A member of the Republican Party, Tarver has been in office since January 8, 2024.

== Career ==
Henry first ran to represent District 42 in 2023 against Douglas Lacombe. He won the October 14, 2023 election with 61.9% against LaCombe's 38.1%.
