= Morganza to the Gulf =

Flood protection system in Louisiana, U.S.

The Morganza to the Gulf Hurricane Protection Project is a flood protection system for Terrebonne Parish and Lafourche Parish in the U.S. state of Louisiana. The targeted area is bounded on the west by Bayou Du Large and LA 311 (Louisiana State Highway 311) and on the east by Bayou Lafourche. The U.S. Army Corps of Engineers is the federal sponsor for this project, and the Louisiana Department of Transportation and Development with the Terrebonne Levee and Conservation District jointly serve as the local sponsor. The Terrebonne Levee and Conservation District will provide operations and maintenance once the system is complete.

== Description ==
The project's purpose is to protect development and the remaining fragile marsh from hurricane storm surge. The area is significantly affected by tides emanating from the Gulf of Mexico. Deterioration of coastal marshes, as a result of saltwater intrusion, land subsidence and the lack of interchanges from the Mississippi River have increased surge inundation. Reduce hurricane and flood damages in an environmentally sustainable manner in the Houma area. The project will protect over 120,000 people and 1,700 square miles (4,400 km^{2}) of saline and fresh marshes, farmlands, heavy and light industry, residential, and other developed areas. Protect development and the remaining fragile marsh from hurricane storm surge.

The hurricane protection system will consist of approximately 72 miles (116 km) of earthen levee with 12 floodgate structures proposed for the navigable waterways and a lock structure in the Houma Navigational Canal measuring 200 feet (61 m) wide by 1,200 feet (370 m) long. The structural features are integrated into the levee alignment to provide flood protection, drainage, and environmental benefits, while allowing navigational passage.

== Benefits ==
Inundation Reduction: This project will provide protection against tidal and hurricane surge up to a Category 3 storm.

Water Supply Protection: This project will eliminate over $200,000 in annual water treatment costs.

Environmental Benefits: This project has net positive benefits to the marshes and wetlands in the Terrebonne Basin.

Safe Harbor: Fishermen will no longer have to leave the area in a storm event.

== Authority ==
A Reconnaissance Study for the Morganza, Louisiana to the Gulf of Mexico Hurricane Protection Project was authorized by Congress in 1992. Following completion of this report, the United States Congress authorized a Feasibility Study in the Energy and Water Development Appropriations Act of 1995 (Public Law 103-316). The Feasibility Study was completed in March 2002 and the Chief of Engineers letter was forwarded to the Secretary of the Army in August 2002 and supplemented in July 2003.

== Features ==
Approximately 72 miles (116 km) of earthen levee, nine 56-foot (17 m) wide (sector gate) navigable floodgates, three 125-foot (38 m) wide (sector gate) navigable floodgates, 12-multi barrel water control structures, and a lock complex consisting of a lock in the Houma Navigation Canal measuring 110 feet (34 m) by 800 feet (240 m), an adjoining navigable floodgate (sector gate) measuring 200 feet (61 m) wide, and a dam closure. The structural features are integrated into the levee alignment to provide flood protection, drainage, environmental benefits, and navigational passage. Construction of this plan is estimated to cost $788 million (2005 price level) and would be cost shared 65% / 35% with LADOTD, the local sponsor.

=== Costs ===
(2006 price level)

Total project cost: $886,700,000

Total federal cost: $576,355,000

Total non-federal cost: $310,345,000

=== Schedule ===
The feasibility report was completed in March 2002. The Chief’s Report was signed on 23 August 2002. Preliminary Engineering and Design (PED) for the Houma Navigation Canal lock is ongoing and scheduled to be completed in December 2007. PED for the additional project features is also ongoing and scheduled to be completed in FY 08.

=== Morganza bill passes Senate by overwhelming vote ===
A bill containing the authorization for Terrebonne's Morganza-to-the-Gulf hurricane protection system, a 72-mile (116 km) system of levees, floodgates and a lock on the Houma Navigation Canal, passed the U.S. Senate by an overwhelming margin today.

The Senate voted 91 to 4 in favor of the Water Resources Development Act, an enormous water projects bill containing the levee system.

Congress has not passed a WRDA bill since 2000, and authorization for the Morganza project has stalled annually with it.

Next WRDA will head to conference committee, where the House and the Senate will iron out any differences between their versions of the bill. Last year, WRDA died in the waning hours of the Senate stuck in conference committee. But Jerome Zeringue, executive director of the Terrebonne Levee and Conservation Board, said that the May passage of WRDA and a lack of differences between the two bill versions should give committee members ample time fine tune WRDA before sending it on to the President's desk for signature.

WRDA may be passed to the president by the end of summer, said Zeringue.

With such an overwhelming majority of legislators voting for WRDA, Zeringue said he felt a veto by the president was unlikely.

"This is a great day for Terrebonne parish," he said.

=== Controversy ===
Many island communities already facing saltwater erosion problems are left severely unprotected by the new levee. Perhaps the most notable of these is Isle de Jean Charles, which was the inspiration for Isle de Charles Doucet in the 2012 film Beasts of the Southern Wild.
