= Jack Montoucet =

American politician (born 1947)

Secretary of the Louisiana Department of Wildlife and Fisheries
- In office January 16, 2017 – April 14, 2023
- Governor: John Bel Edwards
- Preceded by: Charlie Melancon
- Succeeded by: Robert Shadoin

Member of the Louisiana House of Representatives from the 42nd district
- In office 2008 – January 15, 2017
- Preceded by: Gil Pinac
- Succeeded by: John Stefanski

Personal details
- Born: October 1947 (age 79)
- Party: Democratic
- Occupation: Businessman

Jack Montoucet (born October 1947) is an American politician who served as secretary of the Louisiana Department of Wildlife and Fisheries under Democratic Governor John Bel Edwards.

== Career ==
From 2008 to 2017, Montoucet was a Democratic member of the Louisiana House of Representatives for District 42 in Lafayette and Acadia parishes. A resident of Scott in Lafayette Parish, he was the vice chair of the Acadiana delegation and a member of the Democratic Caucus and the Louisiana Rural Caucus. Montoucet retired as the chief of the Lafayette Fire Department and owns the alligator farm, Jacques Crocs and Farm Pride Processors.

== Elections ==
=== 2007 ===
In 2007, Montoucet was elected to the Louisiana House of Representatives. He defeated fellow Democrat Isabella delaHoussaye.

=== 2011 ===
On October 22, 2011, Montoucet won re-election to District 61 of the Louisiana House of Representatives, defeating Republican Anthony Emmons in the primary. Because Louisiana uses a blanket primary system, a candidate can be declared the overall winner of the seat by garnering 50 percent +1 of the vote in the primary.

== Louisiana Secretary of Wildlife and Fisheries ==
He was Secretary of Wildlife and Fisheries under Governor Jeff Landry from until 2017 until 2023.

He resigned on April 14, 2023 during a bribery scandal involving a Louisiana Wildlife and Fisheries Commission member.

Deputy Secretary Robert Shadoin took over when Montoucet resigned.

On March 21, 2025, Montoucet was indicted by a federal grand jury on charges including conspiracy to commit bribery and wire fraud, three counts of wire fraud, and conspiracy to commit money laundering. The indictment alleges that during his tenure as Secretary of the Louisiana Department of Wildlife and Fisheries (LDWF), Montoucet conspired with LDWF Commissioner Dusty Guidry and businessman Leonard Franques to steer a state contract to Franques' company, DGL1, LLC, in exchange for kickbacks. The scheme involved awarding contracts for online education services, with portions of the revenue allegedly set aside as illicit payments to Montoucet, including a $122,507.96 kickback disguised as a "signing bonus" to be paid after his retirement. Montoucet faces up to 20 years in prison and a fine of up to $1 million if convicted.

On June 12, 2025, he pleaded not guilty to all charges. His trial is scheduled for May 2026.

== Sources ==
- This article incorporates text from Ballotpedia, released under the GFDL.

Preceded by Gil Pinac	Louisiana State Representative for District 42 (Acadia and Lafayette parishes); 2008–2017	Succeeded by John Stefanski
Political offices

Preceded by Patrick Banks (interim)	Secretary of the Louisiana Department of Wildlife and Fisheries; 2017-2023	Succeeded by Robert Shadoin
Political offices
