= 2010 United States Senate election in Louisiana =

2010 Louisiana Senate elections

- November 2, 2010
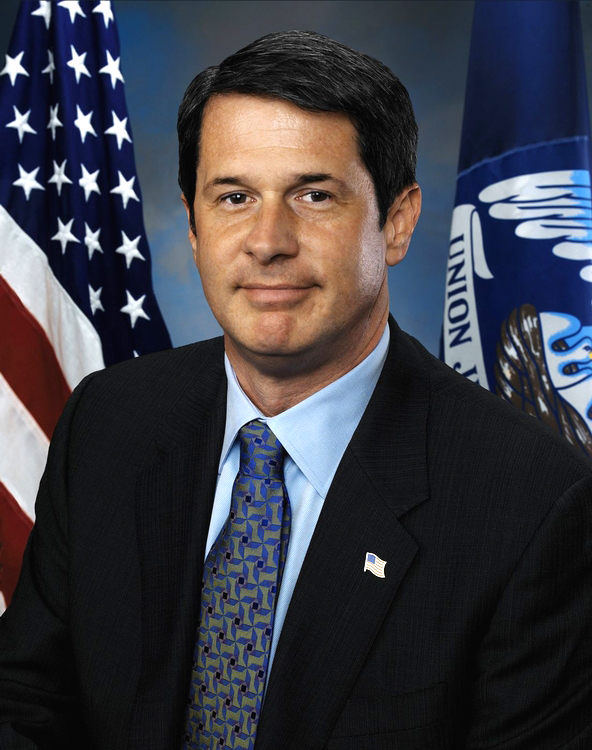

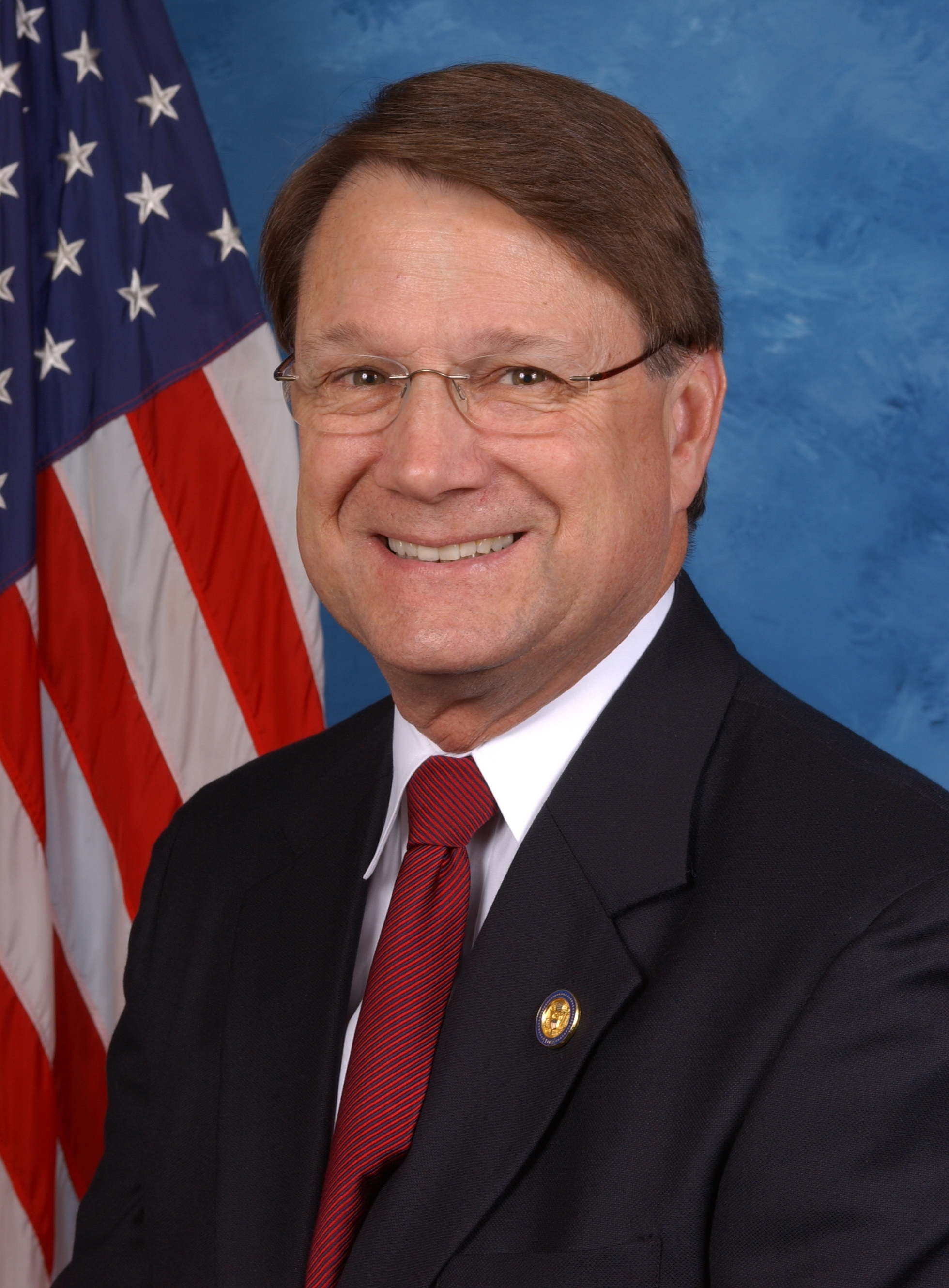
Nominee	David Vitter	Charlie Melançon
Party	Republican	Democratic
Popular vote	715,415	476,572
Percentage	56.55%	37.67%
- Parish results Vitter: 40–50% 50–60% 60–70% 70–80% Melançon: 40–50% 50–60% 70–80%
U.S. senator before election
David Vitter
Republican
Elected U.S. Senator
David Vitter
Republican

The 2010 United States Senate election in Louisiana was held on November 2, 2010. Republican incumbent U.S. Senator David Vitter won re-election to a second term, becoming the first Republican ever to be re-elected to the United States Senate from Louisiana.

== Background ==
- Party primaries: Saturday, August 28, 2010
- Runoffs (if necessary): Saturday, October 2, 2010
- General Election: Tuesday, November 2, 2010,

Vitter faced a potentially serious challenge in the Republican primary as well as the general election. Lieutenant General Russel L. Honoré, who is best known for serving as commander of Joint Task Force Katrina responsible for coordinating military relief efforts for Hurricane Katrina-affected areas across the Gulf Coast, was allegedly mulling over whether or not to challenge Vitter in the Republican Primary. Tony Perkins, a former Louisiana state representative and current president of the socially conservative Family Research Council, acknowledged interest in running against Vitter because of the prostitution scandal. Nonetheless, Perkins decided not to run and endorsed Vitter for reelection.

Some speculated that Vitter's reelection might have become complicated, by the prostitution scandal revealed in 2007, but he continued to lead in aggregate polling against potential opponents.

Following a movement to draft him into the race, John Cooksey, a former U.S. Representative, appeared poised to put together a challenge, planning on spending $200,000 of his own money. Cooksey, however, pulled back and did not qualify.

A campaign to draft porn actress Stormy Daniels began in early 2009. She considered whether to run before ultimately declining.

On June 14, 2009, Congressman Charlie Melançon announced his intentions to run for Senate in 2010. Melançon, who was representing Louisiana's 3rd Congressional District since 2005, released the announcement to his supporters, saying that "Louisiana needs a different approach, more bi-partisan, more disciplined, more honest and with a whole lot more common sense." Melançon was a leader of the Blue Dog Coalition, a group of fiscally conservative Democrats who aim to lower the deficit and reform the budget.

In the weeks before the election a major concern for Vitter's camp was possibly voter apathy about the race. For example, publisher Rolfe H. McCollister Jr., in his Greater Baton Rouge Business Report, endorsed fellow Republican Jay Dardenne over Democrat Caroline Fayard in the simultaneous race for Lieutenant Governor of Louisiana, but then explicitly made "no endorsement" for U.S. Senate:

I have talked with a number of voters who are just not very excited about this race—the candidates or the tone. I'm not either. You're on your own here.

== Democratic primary ==
=== Candidates ===
- Charlie Melançon, U.S. Representative
- Neeson Chauvin
- Cary Deaton

=== Polling ===
Poll Source	Dates administered	Charlie Melançon	Neeson Chauvin	Undecided
Clarus Research Group	August 15–16, 2010	43%	3%	52%

=== Results ===
Results by parish Melançon—80–90% Melançon—70–80% Melançon—60–70% Melançon—50–60% Melançon—40–50%

Democratic Primary results
Party	Candidate	Votes	%
Democratic	Charlie Melançon	77,702	70.61%
Democratic	Neeson Chauvin	19,507	17.73%
Democratic	Cary Deaton	12,842	11.67%
Total votes		110,051	100%

== Republican primary ==
=== Candidates ===
- David Vitter, incumbent U.S. Senator
- Nick Accardo, doctor
- Chet D. Traylor, former Louisiana Supreme Court justice

=== Polling ===
Poll Source	Dates administered	David Vitter (R)	Chet Traylor (R)	Undecided
Clarus Research Group	August 15–16, 2010	74%	5%	18%
Public Policy Polling	August 21–22, 2010	81%	5%	9%

=== Results ===
Results by parish Vitter—>90% Vitter—80–90% Vitter—70–80% Vitter—60–70%

Republican Primary results
Party	Candidate	Votes	%
Republican	David Vitter (Incumbent)	85,179	87.6%
Republican	Chet Traylor	6,838	7.03%
Republican	Nick Accardo	5,221	5.37%
Total votes		97,238	100%

== Libertarian primary ==
=== Candidates ===
- Anthony Gentile
- Randall Todd Hayes

=== Results ===
Libertarian Primary results
Party	Candidate	Votes	%
Libertarian	Randall Todd Hayes	1,529	61.68%
Libertarian	Anthony "Tony G" Gentile	950	38.32%
Total votes		2,479	100%

== General election ==
=== Candidates ===
==== Major ====
- Charlie Melançon (D), U.S. Congressman
- David Vitter (R), incumbent U.S. Senator

==== Minor ====
- Michael Karlton Brown (I)
- Skip Galan (I)
- Milton Gordon (I)
- Randall Todd Hayes (L)
- Tommy LaFargue (I)
- Bob Lang (I)
- William McShan (Reform)
- Sam Houston Melton Jr. (I)
- Mike Spears (I)
- Ernest Wooton (I)

=== Campaign ===
Melançon heavily criticized Vitter for prostitution sex scandal. Vitter released television advertising criticizing Melançon for his support for Obama's stimulus package and his support for amnesty for illegal immigrants.

=== Debates ===
Melançon claimed "In August, Melançon challenged Vitter to a series of five live, televised town hall-style debates across the state. In his 2004 campaign for Senate, Vitter committed to five live, televised debates. Since Melançon issued the challenge, Vitter and Melançon have been invited to a total of seven live, televised debates. Vitter only accepted invitations to debates hosted by WWL-TV and WDSU-TV, both in New Orleans."

- September 7: Sponsored by the Alliance for Good Government at Loyola University.
- October 27: Sponsored by League of Women Voters-New Orleans, National Council of Jewish Women-New Orleans Junior League-New Orleans, and the American Association of University Women-Louisiana. Televised on WDSU-TV in New Orleans.
- October 28: CBS News sponsored the debate. It was televised on WWL-TV and C-SPAN in New Orleans

=== Predictions ===
Source	Ranking	As of
Cook Political Report	Lean R	October 26, 2010
Rothenberg	Likely R	October 22, 2010
RealClearPolitics	Likely R	October 26, 2010
Sabato's Crystal Ball	Likely R	October 21, 2010
CQ Politics	Likely R	October 26, 2010

=== Polling ===
Poll source	Date(s) administered	David Vitter (R)	Charlie Melançon (D)
Research 2000	March 2–4, 2009	48%	41%
Public Policy Polling	July 17–19, 2009	44%	32%
Rasmussen Reports	October 5, 2009	46%	36%
Rasmussen Reports	January 14, 2010	53%	35%
YouGovPolimetrix	January 6–11, 2010	52%	32%
Rasmussen Reports	February 10, 2010	57%	33%
Rasmussen Reports	March 10, 2010	57%	34%
Rasmussen Reports	April 7, 2010	52%	36%
Magellan Strategies	June 10–13, 2010	51%	31%
Public Policy Polling	June 12–13, 2010	46%	37%
Rasmussen Reports	June 24, 2010	53%	35%
Clarus Research Group	August 15–16, 2010	48%	36%
Public Policy Polling	August 21–22, 2010	51%	41%
Rasmussen Reports	August 30, 2010	54%	33%
Magellan Strategies	September 19, 2010	52%	34%
Magellan Strategies	October 10, 2010	51%	35%
Anazalone	October 22, 2010	46%	43%
Clarus Research Group	October 21–24, 2010	50%	38%
Magellan Strategies	October 24, 2010	52%	35%

=== Fundraising ===
Candidate (Party)	Receipts	Disbursements	Cash On Hand	Debt
David Vitter (R)	$8,384,938	$6,833,900	$3,555,994	$0
Charles Melançon (D)	$3,711,556	$4,043,362	$445,853	$0
Source: Federal Election Commission

=== Results ===
United States Senate election in Louisiana, 2010
Party	Candidate	Votes	%	±%
Republican	David Vitter (incumbent)	715,415	56.56%	
Democratic	Charlie Melançon	476,572	37.67%	
Libertarian	Randall Hayes	13,957	1.1%	
Independent	Michael Brown	9,973	0.79%	
Independent	Mike Spears	9,190	0.73%	
Independent	Ernest Wooton	8,167	0.65%	
Independent	Skip Galan	7,474	0.59%	
Reform	William McShan	5,879	0.46%	
Independent	Bob Lang	5,734	0.45%	
Independent	Milton Gordon	4,810	0.38%	
Independent	Tommy LaFargue	4,043	0.32%	
Independent	Sam Melton	3,780	0.3%	
Total votes		1,264,994	100%	
Republican hold				
