= 2007 Louisiana gubernatorial election =

- October 20, 2007
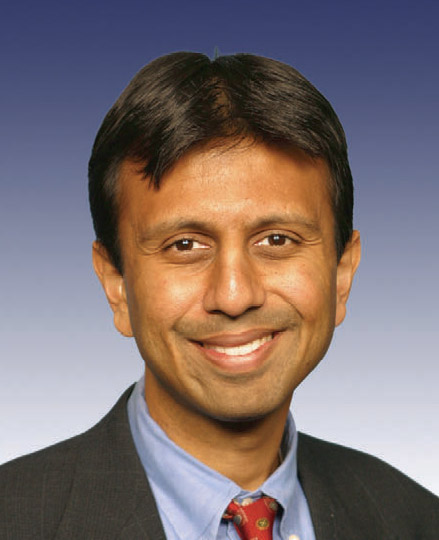

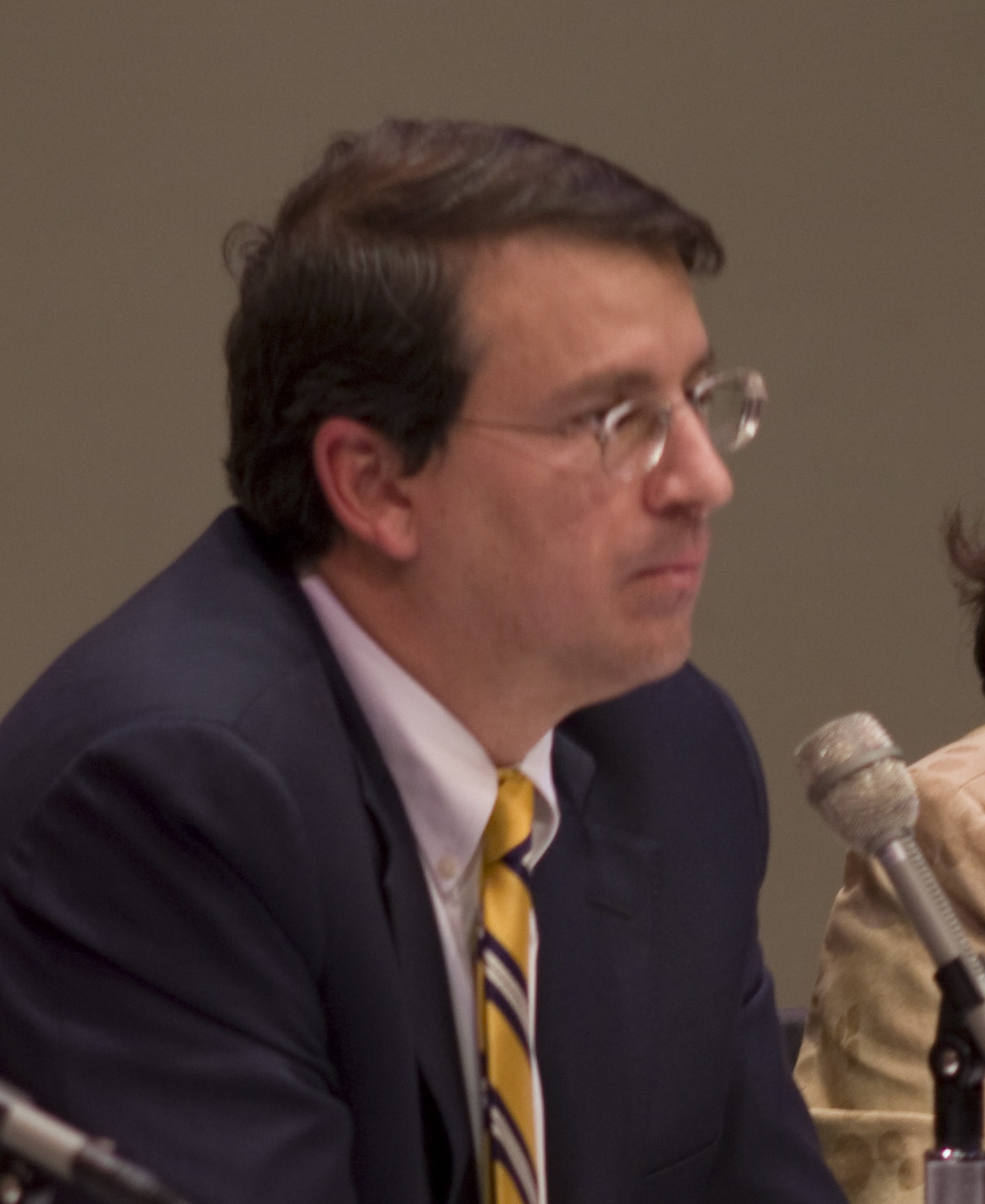

Candidate	Bobby Jindal	Walter Boasso
Party	Republican	Democratic
Popular vote	699,672	226,364
Percentage	53.91%	17.44%
Candidate	John Georges	Foster Campbell
Party	Independent	Democratic
Popular vote	186,800	161,425
Percentage	14.39%	12.44%
- Parish results Jindal: 30–40% 40–50% 50–60% 60–70% 70–80% Boasso: 40–50% Georges: 30–40% Campbell: 30–40% 40–50%
Governor before election
Kathleen Blanco
Democratic
Elected Governor
Bobby Jindal
Republican

The 2007 Louisiana gubernatorial election was held on October 20. Democratic incumbent Kathleen Blanco did not run for re-election to a second term in office. Bobby Jindal won the election in the open jungle primary, capturing a majority of the vote and obviating the need for a run-off election.

This was the first time since 1968 in which the winner of a Louisiana gubernatorial election was of the same party as the incumbent president. This was also the only governorship that Republicans flipped during George W. Bush's second term.

== Background ==
Louisiana state elections, with the exception of U.S. presidential elections (and congressional races from 2008 until 2010), followed a variation of the open primary system called the jungle primary. Candidates of any and all parties are listed on one ballot, and unless one candidate takes more than 50 percent of the vote in the first round, a run-off election is then held between the top two candidates, who may in fact be members of the same party.

The filing deadline for candidates was September 6.

=== Hurricane Katrina and Blanco administration ===
Incumbent Kathleen Blanco originally planned to run for re-election, but she entered the year facing a significant erosion in her popular support, in large part to perceptions of inadequate performance in the aftermath of Hurricane Katrina. In November 2006, Blanco had an approval rating of 39 percent.

In December 2006, Blanco called a special session of the legislature which she intended to use to pass $2.1 billion in tax cuts, teacher raises, road projects, and other spending programs. Legislators allied with Blanco attempted to lift a constitutional spending cap, but Republicans defeated the proposed measures. The high-profile defeat further eroded Blanco's political reputation.

Blanco also faced increasingly strong accusations of delays and incompetence in administering the Road Home Program, a state-run program Blanco set up following Katrina to distribute federal aid to victims. By January 2007, fewer than 250 of an estimated 100,000 applicants had received payments, and many payments apparently underestimated the costs of damages.

By January 2007, early opinion polls showed Blanco trailing Bobby Jindal by over 20 percent. Blanco began her campaign by repeatedly criticizing of the administration of President George W. Bush, noting that Bush neglected to mention Gulf Coast reconstruction in his 2007 State of the Union Address and calling for a bipartisan congressional investigation into the conduct of the Bush administration following Katrina to determine whether partisan politics played a role in the slow response to the storm. The latter proposal followed comments by former Federal Emergency Management Agency director Michael D. Brown, who claimed that the White House had planned to upstage Blanco by federalizing the National Guard in the days following Katrina. Blanco also repeated accusations that Mississippi had received preferential treatment because its governor, Haley Barbour, was a Republican.

== Candidates ==
=== Democratic Party ===
- Walter Boasso, Republican state senator from St. Bernard and Plaquemines parishes and shipping magnate
- Foster Campbell, member of the Public Service Commission and former state senator
- Vinny Mendoza, Kenner resident, Korean War veteran, and perennial candidate
- Hardy Parkerson, Lake Charles attorney
- Mary Volentine Smith, retired Winnsboro hairdresser

==== Withdrew ====
- Kathleen Blanco, incumbent governor since 2004
- John Breaux, lobbyist and former U.S. senator

==== Declined ====
- John Kennedy, Louisiana State Treasurer
- Mitch Landrieu, lieutenant governor since 2004
- Charlie Melançon, U.S. representative from Napoleonville
- Ray Nagin, mayor of New Orleans

=== Republican Party ===
- Bobby Jindal, U.S. representative from Kenner, former Secretary of Health and Hospitals, and candidate for governor in 2003

==== Withdrew ====
- David Vitter, U.S. senator since 2005 and former U.S. representative

=== Independent ===
- Belinda Alexandrenko, Lafayette resident and candidate for governor in 1995 and 1999 (Independent)
- Sheldon Forest, Maurice resident (Independent)
- Anthony Gentile, oil refinery supervisor from Mandeville (Independent)
- John Georges, New Orleans businessman and owner of the Baton Rouge Morning Advocate (Independent) (Note: Georges initially ran as a Republican before leaving the Republican Party to run as an independent.)
- T. Lee Horne III, real estate salesman from Franklin (Libertarian)
- Jim Nichols, Donaldsonville resident and candidate for governor in 1995 (Independent)

== Campaign ==
In early 2007, a number of prominent Democratic figures declined to run. On March 20, following weeks of calls from her own party to step aside, Blanco announced that she would not run for re-election. Former U.S. senator John Breaux, who was a leading candidate to succeed her, faced charges that he would be ineligible to run as a resident and registered voter in Maryland since 2005; he announced on April 13 that he would not be a candidate. On April 17, lieutenant governor Mitch Landrieu also declined to run.

Due to the lack of a high-profile Democratic candidate, party leaders approached Republican state senator Walter Boasso; Boasso formally switched to the Democratic Party on April 26. Boasso, the president and CEO of a network of shipping container facilities and a member of the Port of New Orleans Board of Commissioners, had a reputation as a conservative, pro-business legislator. After Hurricane Katrina, Boasso achieved prominence as a leading advocate for consolidation and reform of the state's Levee Boards.

Foster Campbell, a cattle farmer and insurance businessman from Bossier Parish who served on the Public Service Commission, was a long time advocate for regulating and lowering utility rates. A centerpiece of his populist campaign is a proposal to tax foreign oil refined in Louisiana and use the proceeds to eliminate personal income tax.

By April, two Republicans had emerged as the leading fundraisers in the race. John Georges, a wealthy businessman, had $5.5 million cash on hand and Bobby Jindal, who had led the Republicans in 2003 and narrowly lost to Blanco, had received $5 million in campaign financing. Although Georges would later leave the Republican Party to run as an independent, the financial and polling strength of the two Republicans presented a tremendous challenge to Democratic Party recruitment.

In late late August, an ad campaign by the Louisiana Democratic Party attacked Bobby Jindal on the basis of supposed inflammatory remarks made about Protestantism. The ad was solely aired in the largely Protestant central and northern districts of the state. The ad drew attention to essays Jindal had written over a decade previously discussing his Catholic faith and conversion. One such essay was titled "How Catholicism Is Different – The Catholic Church Isn't Just Another Denomination" was published in 1996 in the New Oxford Review. Jindal said about the ad, "They're absolute lies. We're not talking about an exaggeration." A letter from Jindal's campaign said, "each claim made in the advertisement distorts Mr. Jindal's positions with false and grossly distorted statements."

=== Polling ===
Source	Date	Kathleen Blanco (D)	Walter Boasso (D)	John Breaux (D)	Foster Campbell (D)	John Georges (I)	Bobby Jindal (R)	Undecided /Other
Loyola Institute of Politics	October 2–8, 2007	–	9%	–	7%	9%	50%	25%
Southeastern Louisiana University	October 1–7, 2007	–	10%	–	6%	9%	46%	29%
Kitchens Group	September 4, 2007	–	11%	–	8%	7%	51%	23%
Verne Kennedy	August 23, 2007	–	11%	–	3%	8%	50%	7% (Note: Includes 7% for Ray Nagin.)
Southern Media and Opinion Research	August 3–6, 2007	–	10%	–	3%	2%	60%	25% (Note: Includes 11% for Ray Nagin.)
Southern Media and Opinion Research	August 3–6, 2007	–	14%	–	4%	1%	63%	18%
Anzalone Liszt Research	July 8–12, 2007	–	21%	–	6%	1%	52%	20%
Anzalone Liszt Research	May 7–9, 2007	–	6%	–	9%	1%	62%	22%
John Breaux declines to run
Verne Kennedy	March 29–April 3, 2007	–	1%	23%	2%	10%	39%	25% (Note: Includes 5% for Mitch Landrieu, 4% for John Kennedy, 1% for Richard Ieyoub, and 0% for Jim Bernhardt.)
Kathleen Blanco declines to run
Southern Media and Opinion Research	March 19, 2007	–	2%	26%	5%	–	56%	11%
Southern Media and Opinion Research	March 19, 2007	24%	2%	–	4%	–	59%	11%
Southern Media and Opinion Research	January 18, 2007	31%	–	–	6%	–	58%	5%
Verne Kennedy	October 24–30, 2006	20%	–	–	–	–	52%	28% (Note: Includes 9% for Mitch Landrieu, 9% for David Vitter, and 3% for Charlie Melancon.)
Verne Kennedy	March 17–19, 2006	16%	1%	17%	1%	–	39%	26% (Note: Includes 10% for David Vitter, 2% for Richard Ieyoub, and 1% for Jim Bernhardt.)
Verne Kennedy	February 7–15, 2006	16%	–	–	1%	23%	36%	24% (Note: Includes 7% for Mitch Landrieu, 5% for David Vitter, and 1% for Jim Bernhardt.)

=== Predictions ===
Source	Ranking	As of
Sabato's Crystal Ball	Likely R (flip)	October 20, 2007

=== Results ===
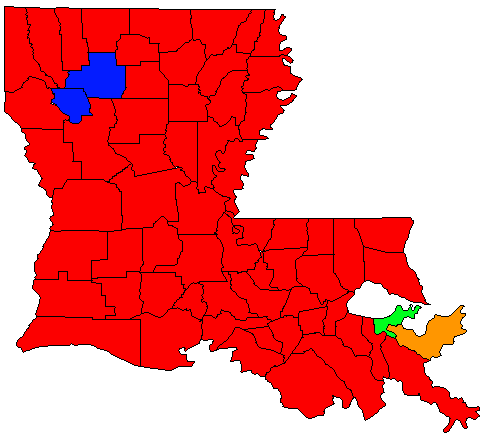
Parishes won by Gubernatorial Candidates in the October 20, 2007 Election. Bobby Jindal (60) Foster Campbell (2) Walter Boasso (1) John Georges (1)

Louisiana gubernatorial election, 2007
Party	Candidate	Votes	%	±%
Republican	Bobby Jindal	699,672	53.91	
Democratic	Walter Boasso	226,364	17.44	
Independent	John Georges	186,800	14.39	
Democratic	Foster Campbell	161,425	12.44	
Democratic	Mary Volentine Smith	5,843	0.45	
Independent	Belinda Alexandrenko	4,782	0.37	
Independent	Anthony Gentile	3,369	0.36	
Libertarian	T. Lee Horne, III	2,639	0.2	
Independent	Sheldon Forest	2,319	0.18	
Democratic	M. V. "Vinny" Mendoza	2,076	0.16	
Democratic	Hardy Parkerson	1,661	0.13	
Independent	Arthur D. "Jim" Nichols	993	0.08	
Majority		473,308	36.47%	
Turnout		1,297,943	100%	
Republican gain from Democratic		Swing		

== See also ==
- 2007 United States gubernatorial elections
- State of Louisiana
- Governors of Louisiana
