= Eric Skrmetta =

American lawyer (born 1958)

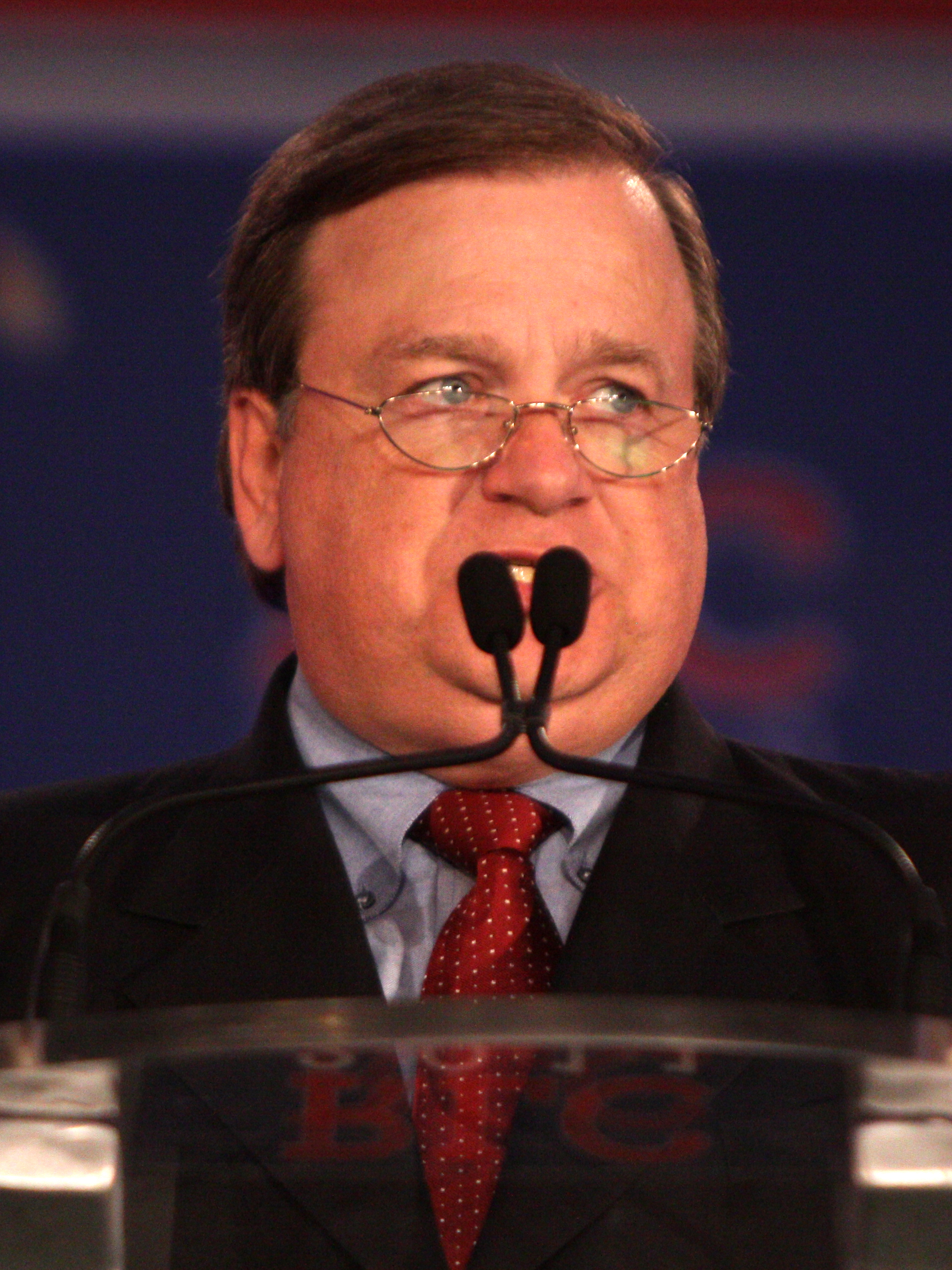
- Skrmetta in 2011

Member of the Louisiana Public Service Commission from the 1st district
- Incumbent
- Assumed office January 1, 2009
- Preceded by: Jay Blossman

Personal details
- Born: Eric Frederick Skrmetta; October 1, 1958 (age 67) New Orleans, Louisiana, U.S.
- Party: Republican
- Children: 2
- Education: Louisiana State University (BA); Southern University (JD); Tulane University (LLM)

Eric Frederick Skrmetta (born October 1, 1958) is an American politician who represents District 1 (largely suburban New Orleans, eastern Florida Parishes, and River Parishes) on the Louisiana Public Service Commission (PSC). Skrmetta is a member of the Republican Party.

== Education and background ==
After finishing Brother Martin High School in New Orleans, Skrmetta attended Louisiana State University, where he was a member of Tau Kappa Epsilon fraternity, and in 1981, he received his B.S. degree in industrial technology. In 1985 he was a cum laude graduate (juris doctor) of Southern University School of Law, passed the Louisiana Bar Exam, and entered the practice of law. In 1986 Skrmetta received his LL.M. in admiralty law from Tulane University Law School.

Since 1989 he has focused on legal mediation. A member of the Louisiana Republican State Central Committee for District 81, in 2003 he unsuccessfully sought to represent the coterminous District 81 in the Louisiana House of Representatives.

== 2008 Public Service Commissioner campaign ==
Skrmetta won the race for Public Service Commissioner in a November 4, 2008 runoff after two other candidates (Bruce Kincade and Ken Odinet Sr.) were eliminated in the primary election. His runoff opponent was former Public Service Commissioner John F. Schwegmann, who had no party affiliation. Skrmetta had the support of then-incumbent District 1 commissioner Jay Blossman, who was barred by term limits from seeking reelection. Skrmetta assumed his commissionership office on January 1, 2009 for a term that ended on December 31, 2014.

== Public Service Commissioner ==
As Public Service Commissioner, Skrmetta has sought clarification of Louisiana’s ethics regulations, which have tightened since the state’s populistic past. In particular, he has sought to displace meal reimbursements to commissioners from regulated utility companies with reimbursements by the Public Service Commission itself.

== 2026 US Senate campaign ==
In July 2025, Skrmetta announced he would challenge Bill Cassidy for his seat in the United States Senate. He withdrew his campaign in February 2026.

== Personal life ==
Eric Skrmetta has two children. Skrmetta is involved in various religious and community organizations. He lives in Metairie, Louisiana
