= John Georges =

American businessman

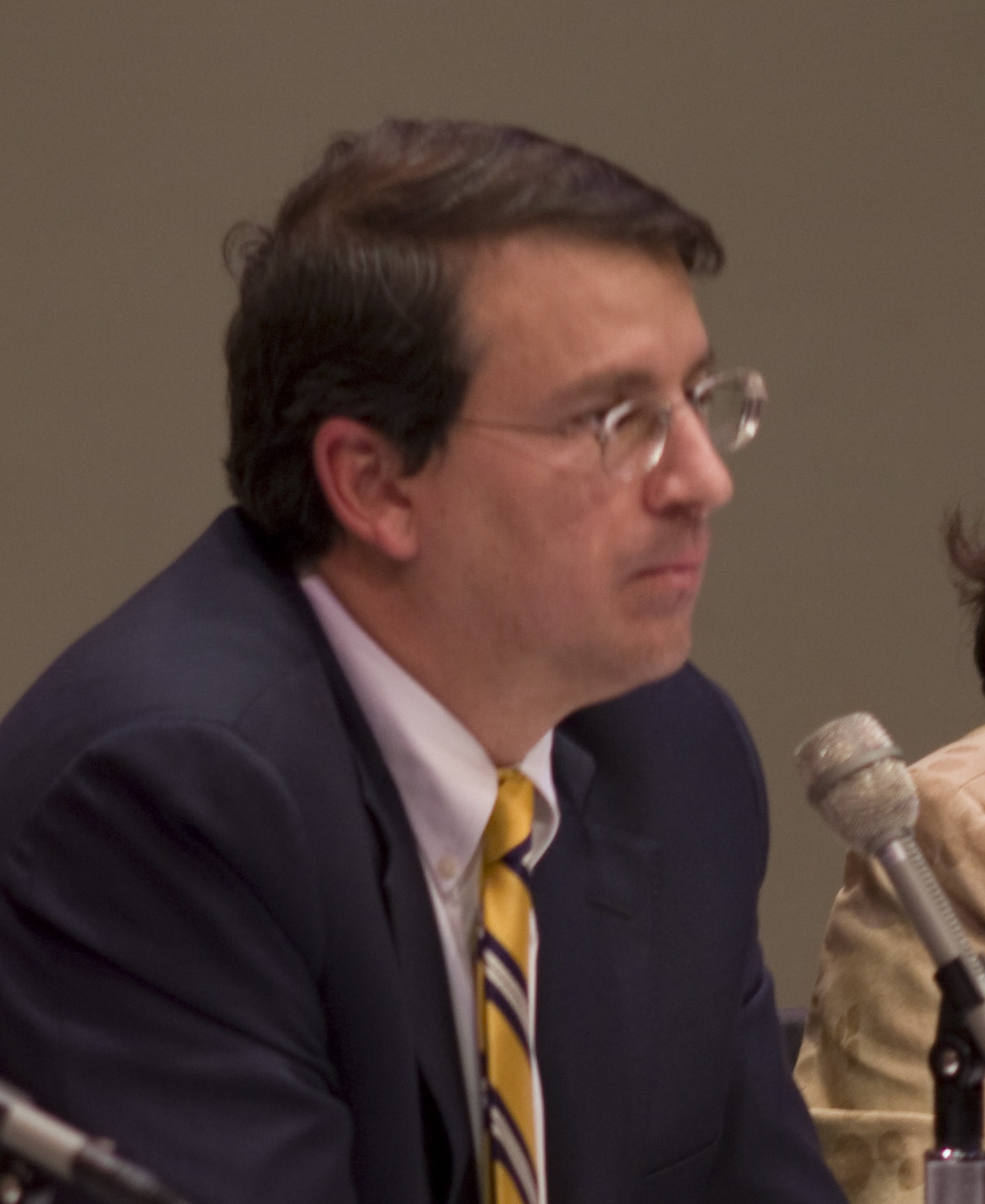
- John in 2010
- Born: October 16, 1960 (age 65); New Orleans, Louisiana, U.S.
- Education: Tulane University
- Occupation: Businessman
- Political party: Republican Party (Until 2007; 2017-)
- Other political affiliations: Democratic (2009-2017); Independent (2007-2009)
- Spouse: Dathel Coleman
- Children: 3

John Georges (Greek: Υιάννης Γεωργής) (born October 16, 1960) is an American businessman from New Orleans, who owns Louisiana's two largest newspapers and online news sites. He formerly served on the Louisiana Board of Regents, the body which supervises higher education in his native state. In 2007, he ran for governor as an independent. He received 186,000 votes and procured a plurality in Orleans Parish. In 2010, he sought the office of mayor of New Orleans as a Democrat; he finished a distant third behind two other Democrats.

== Early life ==
John Georges was born in New Orleans to Dennis and Anita Georges. His father was a Greek immigrant who put John to work at the age of eleven sweeping the warehouse for the family business. At the age of fifteen, he began making deliveries in a truck. Georges maintained leadership roles throughout his education, ranging from high school class president and student body president to president of his fraternity in college. He continued working throughout college and graduated in 1983 on the dean's list from Tulane University.

== Personal life ==
John met his wife, the former Dathel Coleman, on a blind date set up by their best friends. They have two daughters, Zana and Liza, and a son, Nike, who serves as president of Georges Enterprises, the parent company of Georges Media Group.

Georges is a Greek Orthodox Christian, an Archon of the Ecumenical Patriarchate, and a founding board member of The Hellenic Initiative. He has also served in leadership roles at Holy Trinity Greek Orthodox Cathedral in New Orleans.

== Career ==
Georges was a commissioner of the New Orleans Public Belt Railroad and is the chairman of Georges Enterprises. The Public Belt Commission exerts management of the publicly owned terminal-switching railroad in New Orleans and maintains the railroad portion of the Huey P. Long Bridge over the Mississippi River. In 2008, the New Orleans Public Belt Railroad celebrated the opening of its refurbished main facility.

In 1992, Georges was appointed by the governor to the Board of Regents, which has budgetary responsibility for Louisiana's public higher education, including nineteen public colleges, universities, and professional schools. He has served as a member of over 25 boards - including the University of New Orleans Foundation, LSU Medical Foundation, and Tulane President's Council, the National WWII Museum, the Miller Center at the University of Virginia, the St. Nicholas Greek Orthodox Church, St. Augustine High School, the Hellenic Initiative and more.

John Georges is now chairman of Georges Enterprises, which includes grocery distribution, offshore marine services, video and arcade entertainment, food services, and investments. Georges Enterprises began as Imperial Trading Company in 1916. Imperial Trading is a wholesale grocery company that distributes goods ranging from candy to health and beauty products. When Georges joined the Imperial Trading Company it was a $29 million business; today, he claims the estimated sales at nearly $1 billion annually. In 2016, Imperial acquired S. Abraham and Sons in Grand Rapids Michigan. Combined, they make the 5th largest convenience store distributor in the United States with 6 distribution centers servicing stores in 20 states. In 2009 Georges bought into Galatoire's restaurant, a world famous restaurant located on Bourbon Street, which is known for its rowdy Friday lunches.

On April 30, 2013, Georges completed the purchase of The Advocate, the largest daily newspaper in Louisiana. He is the new publisher of The Advocate, a paper founded in 1842. In March 2013, Georges signed a letter of intent to purchase The Advocate, whose circulation in 2013 is 98,000 (daily) and 125,000 (Sunday) as a result of its entry and 20,000 subscriptions in the New Orleans market following the decision of The Times-Picayune to limit print publications to 3 days a week. The Advocate serves readers not only in the capital city and its environs but a swath of territory from Lafayette to New Orleans. It is among the relatively few newspapers in the United States whose print circulation is growing. Since 1909, The Advocate had been owned by Charles P. Manship, Sr., and his subsequent heirs. Georges named Dan Shea as general manager of The Advocate and Peter Kovacs as the editor. In 2019, Georges purchased The Times-Picayune and merged it with the New Orleans edition of The Advocate to form The Times-Picayune | The New Orleans Advocate. The acquisition brought daily news and daily paper deliveries back to New Orleans. The Times Picayune - New Orleans Advocate's website, Nola.com, reaches over 90 million unique worldwide readers every year. The Advocate was awarded the Pulitzer Prize in 2019 for local reporting on the lack of unanimous vote for criminal convictions.

== 2007 campaign for governor ==
John Georges came in third place in the 2007 Louisiana gubernatorial election, despite having never run for public office previously. As an independent, he finished third in the balloting with 186,800 votes (14 percent). He achieved a plurality in his hometown of New Orleans. Republican Bobby Jindal, making his second bid for governor, won outright in the primary with 54 percent of the vote. Democrats Walter Boasso, a departing state senator from St. Bernard Parish near New Orleans, and Foster Campbell, a Louisiana Public Service Commissioner from Bossier Parish, finished second and fourth, respectively. Jindal prevailed in sixty parishes. Georges won 36 percent of the vote in Orleans Parish; that was his only plurality showing among the state's sixty-four parishes.

=== Attention from the press ===
Georges began running television ads for his campaign the last week in July. Georges candidacy has attracted the attention of the Greek press in the United States. The Baton Rouge Morning Advocate reported that Georges would tout himself as a political outsider and newcomer to state politics.

=== Campaign finance ===
Georges contributed around $5 million of his own money into his campaign account. Georges reports that he has over $7 million as of late July. About $120,000 came from donations from others to his campaign. Jindal, by comparison, reports around $7.5 million. However, Jindal has raised money from a greater number of donors. Georges spent almost $12 million on his campaign and garnered 186,800 votes. His spending amounted to $64 per vote, which represents the highest spending per vote for a gubernatorial candidate in any state in 2007.

Veteran Louisiana political reporter John Hill notes that Georges made the largest known buy of television ads in the 2007 election. He purchased $2 million in advertising in August. The next largest known expenditure in this election was Walter Boasso's $1.3 million purchase for June. Jindal's campaign did not disclose its media expenditures.

== 2010 campaign for mayor ==
Georges announced his candidacy in the 2010 New Orleans mayoral election on November 4, 2009. Despite spending more on his campaign the any other candidate, Georges finished a distant 3rd with 9.21% of the vote in the election which saw a victory by Mitch Landrieu in the first round of voting.
