= Bobby Jindal =

American politician (born 1971)

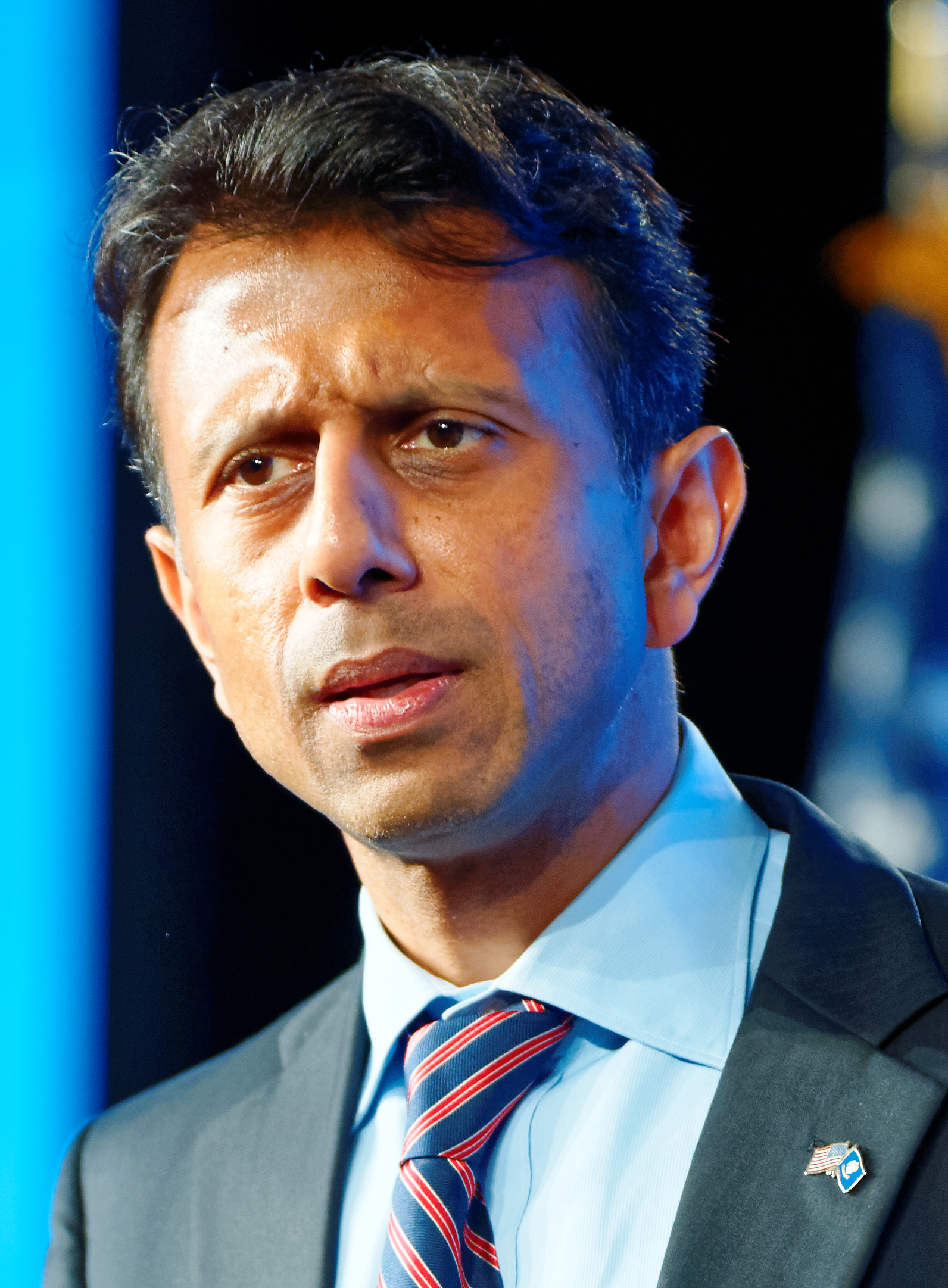
- Jindal in 2015

55th Governor of Louisiana
- In office January 14, 2008 – January 11, 2016
- Lieutenant: Mitch Landrieu; Scott Angelle; Jay Dardenne
- Preceded by: Kathleen Blanco
- Succeeded by: John Bel Edwards

Member of the U.S. House of Representatives from Louisiana's 1st district
- In office January 3, 2005 – January 14, 2008
- Preceded by: David Vitter
- Succeeded by: Steve Scalise

Assistant Secretary of Health and Human Services for Planning and Evaluation
- In office July 9, 2001 – February 21, 2003
- President: George W. Bush
- Preceded by: Margaret Hamburg
- Succeeded by: Michael O'Grady

Personal details
- Born: Piyush Jindal; June 10, 1971 (age 55) Baton Rouge, Louisiana, U.S.
- Party: Republican
- Spouse: Supriya Jolly (m. 1997)
- Children: 3
- Education: Brown University (BS); New College, Oxford (MLitt)
- Website: Official website

Piyush "Bobby" Jindal (born June 10, 1971) is an American former politician who served as the 55th governor of Louisiana from 2008 to 2016. A member of the Republican Party, Jindal previously served as a U.S. representative from Louisiana from 2005 to 2008, and served as chair of the Republican Governors Association from 2012 to 2013.

In 1995, Jindal was appointed secretary of the Louisiana Department of Health and Hospitals. In 1999, he was appointed president of the University of Louisiana System. At 28, Jindal became the youngest person to hold the position. In 2001, President George W. Bush appointed Jindal as principal adviser to the U.S. Secretary of Health and Human Services.

Jindal first ran for governor of Louisiana in 2003, but lost in the runoff election to Democratic candidate Kathleen Blanco. In 2004, he was elected to the U.S. House of Representatives, becoming the second Indian American in Congress, and he was reelected in 2006. To date, he is the only Indian American Republican to have ever served in Congress. Jindal ran for governor again in the 2007 election and won. Jindal was re-elected in 2011 in a landslide, winning more than 65 percent of the vote. He was the first Indian American governor in U.S. history, and was the only Indian American governor in U.S. history until Nikki Haley became Governor of South Carolina in 2011.

On June 24, 2015, Jindal announced his candidacy for the Republican nomination in the 2016 presidential election. He suspended his campaign in November 2015, subsequently announcing his support for Marco Rubio. He finished his term as governor in January 2016.

== Early life and education ==
Jindal was born on June 10, 1971, in Baton Rouge, Louisiana, to immigrant Indian Punjabi Hindu parents. He is the first of two sons of Raj (née Gupta) and Amar Jindal, from Punjab, India. His father is a civil engineer and graduate of Guru Nanak Dev University and Panjab University. His mother is a graduate of Rajasthan University and worked in nuclear physics at the Postgraduate Institute of Medical Education and Research in Chandigarh. Both worked as lecturers at an engineering college. Jindal's paternal grandfather was a merchant from Khanpur, Samrala and his maternal grandfather was a Ferozepur banker.

In January 1971, the family left Malerkotla, Punjab for Baton Rouge. They settled near Louisiana State University, where his mother was to begin graduate studies in nuclear physics.

Jindal attended Baton Rouge Magnet High School, where he competed in math tournaments as a member of Mu Alpha Theta. Outside of high school, he played tennis at the local community center; started various enterprises such as a computer newsletter, retail candy business, and a mail-order software company; and worked in the concession stands at LSU football games. He graduated in 1988.

Jindal then enrolled in Brown University where he was admitted to the Program in Liberal Medical Education (PLME), an eight-year combined baccalaureate-M.D. medical program. While at Brown, he led the College Republicans student group and was named a USA Today Academic All-Star. After graduating in 1992 with dual honors in biology and public policy, he chose not to continue the program. He applied to and was accepted by both Harvard Medical School and Yale Law School, but instead attended New College, Oxford as a Rhodes Scholar. In 1994, he received an MLitt in political science with an emphasis in health policy. The subject of his thesis was "A needs-based approach to health care".

== Career ==
After completing his studies at Oxford, Jindal turned down an offer to study for a D.Phil. in politics, instead joining the consulting firm McKinsey & Company. He then interned in the office of Rep. Jim McCrery of Louisiana, where McCrery assigned him to work on healthcare policy; Jindal spent two weeks studying Medicare to compile an extensive report on possible solutions to Medicare's financial problems, which he presented to McCrery.

== Early political career (1996–2003) ==
=== Foster administration ===
In 1993, McCrery introduced Jindal to Governor Mike Foster. In 1996, Foster appointed Jindal as Secretary of the Louisiana Department of Health and Hospitals, an agency that represented about 40 percent of the state budget and employed over 12,000 people. Foster called Jindal a genius who had a great deal of medical knowledge. Jindal was 24 at the time.

During his tenure, Louisiana's Medicaid program went from bankruptcy with a $400 million deficit into three years of surpluses totaling $220 million.

Jindal was criticized during the 2007 campaign by the Louisiana AFL–CIO for closing some local clinics to reach that surplus. Under Jindal's term, Louisiana nationally rose to third place in child healthcare screenings, with child immunizations rising, and introduced new and expanded services for the elderly and the disabled.

In 1998, Jindal was appointed executive director of the National Bipartisan Commission on the Future of Medicare, a 17-member panel charged with devising plans to reform Medicare. In 1999, at the request of the Louisiana governor's office and the Louisiana State Legislature, Jindal examined how Louisiana might use its $4.4 billion share of the tobacco settlement.

In 1998, Jindal received the Samuel S. Beard Award for greatest public service by an individual 35 years old or under, an award given annually by Jefferson Awards.

At 28 years of age in 1999, Jindal was appointed to become the youngest-ever president of the University of Louisiana System, the nation's 16th largest system of higher education with over 80,000 students.

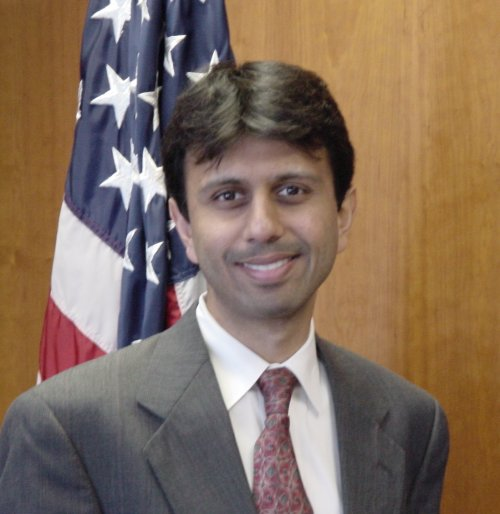
Jindal while working for the Department of Health and Human Services

=== Bush administration ===
In March 2001, he was nominated by President George W. Bush to be Assistant Secretary of Health and Human Services for Planning and Evaluation. He was later unanimously confirmed by a vote of the United States Senate and began serving on July 9, 2001. In that position, he served as the principal policy adviser to the Secretary of Health and Human Services. He resigned from that post on February 21, 2003, to return to Louisiana and run for governor. He was assigned to help fight the nurse shortage by examining steps to improve nursing education.

=== 2003 election for governor ===
Jindal came to national prominence during the 2003 election for governor of Louisiana. In what Louisianans call an "open primary" (but which is technically a nonpartisan blanket primary), Jindal finished first with 33 percent of the vote. He received endorsements from the largest paper in Louisiana, the Times-Picayune; the newly elected Democratic mayor of New Orleans, Ray Nagin; and the outgoing Republican governor, Mike Foster.

In the second balloting, Jindal faced the outgoing lieutenant governor, Kathleen Babineaux Blanco of Lafayette, a Democrat. Despite winning in Blanco's hometown, he lost many normally conservative parishes in north Louisiana, and Blanco prevailed with 52 percent of the popular vote.

Some political analysts blamed Jindal's loss for his refusal to answer questions targeted at his religion and ethnic background brought up in several Democratic advertisements, which the Jindal campaign called "negative attack ads." Despite losing the election in 2003, the run for governor made Jindal a well-known figure on the state's political scene and a rising star within the Republican Party.

== U.S. House of Representatives (2005–2008) ==
=== Elections ===
==== 2004 ====
A few weeks after the 2003 gubernatorial runoff, Jindal decided to run for Louisiana's 1st congressional district. The incumbent, David Vitter, was running for the Senate seat being vacated by John Breaux. The Louisiana Republican Party endorsed him in the primary although Mike Rogers, also a Republican, was running for the same seat. The 1st District has been in Republican hands since a 1977 special election and is widely considered to be staunchly conservative. Jindal's campaign was able to raise over $1 million very early in the campaign, making it harder for other candidates to effectively raise funds to oppose him. He won the 2004 election with 78 percent of the vote.

Jindal was only the second Indian-American to be elected to the United States Congress, after Dalip Singh Saund was elected in November 1955.

==== 2006 ====
Jindal won re-election to a second term with 88% of the vote.

=== Congressional tenure ===
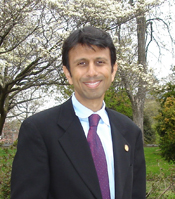
Jindal served as congressman for a term-and-a-half until his election as governor.

He was the second Indian American elected to Congress. He has reportedly lived in Kenner, Metairie, and Baton Rouge.

In 2005, Jindal criticized Bush's budget for not calling for enough spending cuts. He warned of the growth of Medicaid saying "Congress may act without them...there seems to be growing momentum that the status quo is not defensible." Jindal praised Bush's leadership on social security reform, saying "The administration has a lot more work to do to continue educating the American people about the very serious challenges facing Social Security."

In response to Hurricane Katrina, Jindal stated "If we had been investing resources in restoring our coast, it wouldn't have prevented the storm, but the barrier islands would have absorbed some of the tidal surge."

=== Committee assignments ===
- House Committee on Homeland Security
- House Committee on Resources
- House Committee on Education and the Workforce

He was made vice-chairman of the House Subcommittee on the Prevention of Nuclear and Biological Attacks. Jindal served as president of the incoming freshman class of congressmen in 2004. He was elected to the position of House assistant majority whip, a senior leadership role. He served in this capacity from 2004 to 2006.

== 2007 gubernatorial election ==
On January 22, 2007, Jindal announced his candidacy for governor. Polling data showed him with an early lead in the race, and he remained the favorite throughout the campaign. He defeated eleven opponents in the nonpartisan blanket primary held on October 20, including two prominent Democrats, State Senator Walter Boasso of Chalmette and Louisiana Public Service Commissioner Foster Campbell of Bossier City, and an independent, New Orleans businessman John Georges.

Jindal finished with 699,672 votes (54 percent). Boasso ran second with 226,364 votes (17 percent). Georges finished with 186,800 (14 percent), and Campbell, who is also a former state senator, ran fourth with 161,425 (12 percent). The remaining candidates collectively polled three percent of the vote. This marked the first time that a non-incumbent candidate for governor was elected without a runoff under the Louisiana election system.

== Governor of Louisiana (2008–2016) ==
=== First term ===
As governor-elect, Jindal named a new ethics team, with Democratic Shreveport businesswoman Virginia Kilpatrick Shehee, the first woman to have served in the state senate, as the vice-chairman of the panel. Jindal assumed the position of governor when he took the oath of office on January 14, 2008. At thirty-six, he became the youngest sitting governor in the United States. He is also Louisiana's first non-white governor since P. B. S. Pinchback served for thirty-five days during Reconstruction, and the first non-white governor to be elected (Pinchback succeeded to the position of lieutenant governor on the death of Oscar Dunn, then to governor upon the impeachment of Henry Clay Warmoth). Additionally, Jindal became the first Indian American to be elected governor of any state in the United States. In a salute to the 2007 LSU Tigers football national championship team during his January 14, 2008, inauguration speech, Jindal stated in part "...They revere our athletes. Geaux Tigers...."

In 2008, Jindal was ranked one of the nation's most popular governors with an approval rating of 77%.

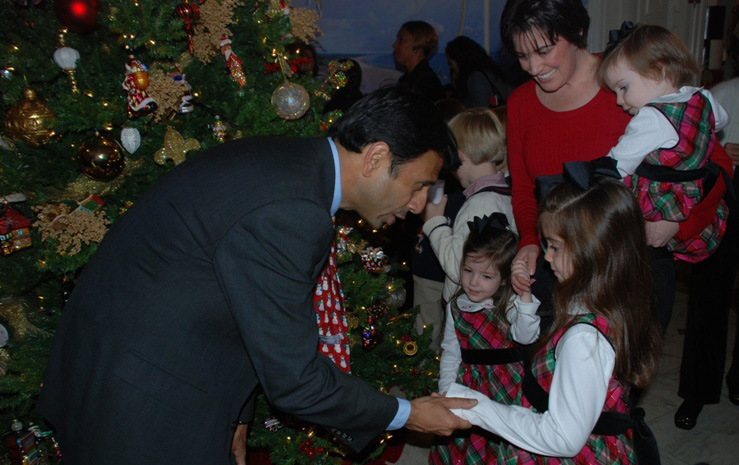
Governor Jindal greets children of deployed Louisiana National Guard Soldiers at the lighting of the State Capitol Christmas tree.

On June 27, 2008, Louisiana's Secretary of State confirmed that a recall petition had been filed against Jindal in response to Jindal's refusal to veto a bill that would have more than doubled the current state legislative pay. During his gubernatorial campaign, Jindal had pledged to prevent legislative pay raises that would take effect during the current term.

Jindal responded by saying that he is opposed to the pay increase, but that he had pledged to let the legislature govern themselves.

On June 30, 2008, Jindal reversed his earlier position by vetoing the pay raise legislation, stating that he made a mistake by staying out of the pay raise issue. In response, the petitioners dropped their recall effort.

Standard and Poor's raised Louisiana's bond rating and credit outlook from stable to positive in 2009. In announcing this change, the organization gave credit to the state's strong management and "commitment to streamlining its government functions." Jindal met with President Barack Obama in October 2009 where the governor pushed for increased federal dollars to cover rising Medicaid costs, speeding the construction of hurricane-protection barriers, and financing the proposed Louisiana State University teaching hospital. During a town hall meeting, Obama praised Jindal as a "hard working man who is doing a good job" for the State, and expressed support for the governor's overhaul of the State's educational system in the area of increased charter schools.

Jindal negotiated an agreement whereby Foster Farms, a private chicken processor, would receive $50 million in taxpayer funds to purchase a chicken processing plant owned by bankrupt Pilgrim's Pride.

Some claimed there is a conflict of interest in that Pilgrim's Pride founder Lonnie "Bo" Pilgrim contributed $2500 to Jindal's campaign in 2007. Other contributors to Jindal's campaign who benefited from economic development spending include Albemarle and Edison Chouest Offshore. Jindal however released a statement saying that this legislation saved over 1,000 jobs, serves as a stimulus to Louisiana's economy, and had wide bipartisan support.

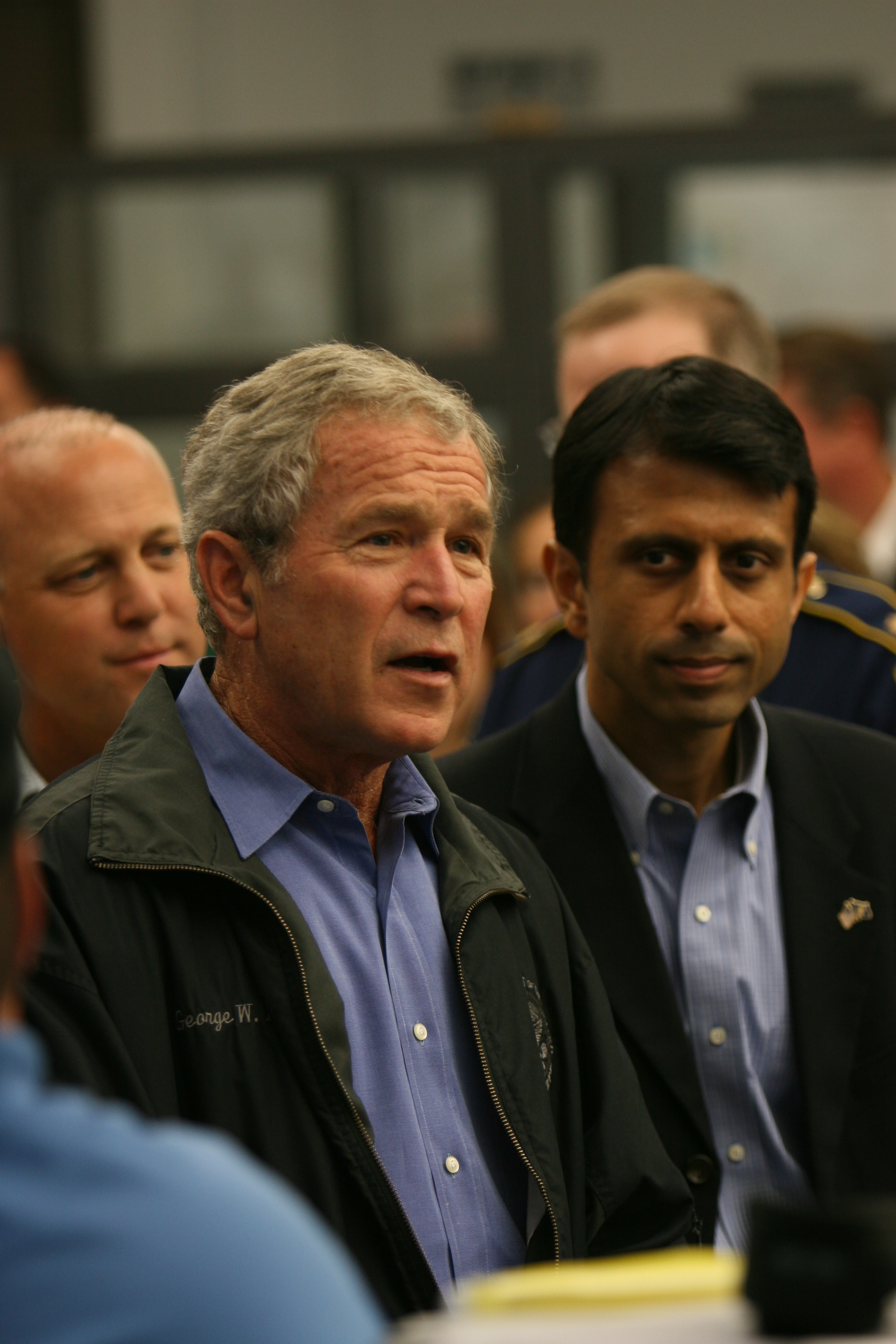
Then President George W. Bush and Jindal greeting EOC employees, during disaster recovery efforts for Hurricane Gustav, September 2008

==== Hurricane Gustav ====
Jindal oversaw one of the largest evacuations in U.S. history (nearly two million people) in late August 2008 prior to the Louisiana landfall of Hurricane Gustav. He issued mandatory evacuation orders for the state's coastal areas and activated 3,000 National Guardsman to aid in the exodus. He also ordered the state to purchase generators to provide needed power to hospitals and nursing homes without power. Government officials vacated hospitals and nursing homes and put the poor, the ill, and the elderly on buses and trains out of town. The evacuation was credited as one reason that Gustav resulted in only 16 deaths in the U.S. The state's successful response to Hurricane Gustav was in stark contrast to the failed hurricane response system for Hurricane Katrina in 2005. Jindal received bipartisan praise for his leadership during Gustav. Jindal had been scheduled to address the Republican National Convention, but cancelled his plans in order to focus on Louisiana's needs during the storm.

=== 2011 re-election campaign ===
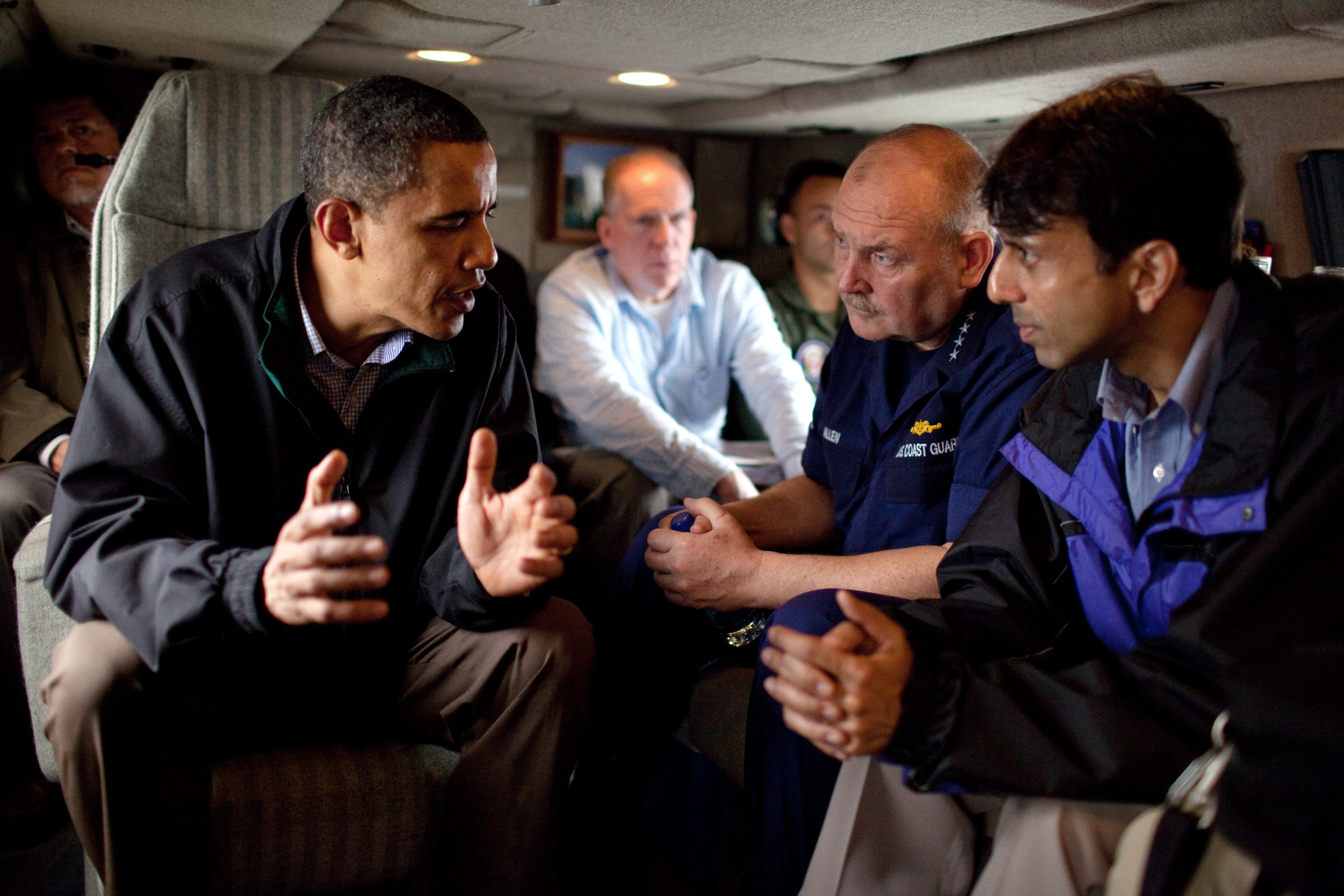
U.S. President Barack Obama talks with Louisiana Governor Bobby Jindal and U.S. Coast Guard Commandant Admiral Thad Allen in May 2010.

Jindal announced his intention to seek reelection in 2011. In the face of Jindal's high approval ratings and considerable campaign funds, Democrats struggled to land a recruit of any substance. Running against four Democrats, a Libertarian and four independents in the jungle primary, Jindal received 66% of the vote in the blanket primary, thereby winning election in the first round.

=== Second term ===
In August 2011, the American Legislative Exchange Council (ALEC) awarded Jindal the Thomas Jefferson Freedom Award for "outstanding public service".

On October 25, 2011, in preparing for his second term, Jindal tapped Republican state representative Chuck Kleckley of Lake Charles and State Senator John Alario of Westwego as his choices for Speaker of the Louisiana House of Representatives and Louisiana Senate President, respectively. Both were confirmed by legislators. Alario is a long-term Democrat who switched parties prior to the 2011 elections. In January 2012, Jindal elevated John C. White, the short-term superintendent at the Recovery School District in New Orleans, to the position of state superintendent of education.

In August 2012, Jindal declared a statewide state of emergency due to the threat of subsidence and subsurface instability that threatens the lives and property of the citizens of the state.

By the end of Jindal's second term, he saw a marked drop in his state popularity and problems such as a budget deficit and cuts to public expenditure. He could not stand for a third term because the governor of Louisiana is subject to term limits.

==== Tax system proposals ====
In January 2013, Jindal released a plan that would eliminate the Louisiana state income tax, which he felt would expand business investment in the state, and then raise sales taxes in order to keep the plan revenue-neutral. Self-styled taxpayer watchdog and former legislative aide C.B. Forgotston correctly predicted that Jindal's plan would fail to clear the legislature because of the higher sales taxes, the lack of needed support from Democrats, and the likelihood that the plan would not increase overall state revenues.

On April 8, 2013, the first day of the legislative session, Jindal dropped the plan after acknowledging some negative response to the plan from legislators and the public, but said he would still like the legislature to formulate its own plan that could end the state income tax.

==== Energy plan ====
Jindal announced, in September 2014, a six-point energy platform that would, among other things, open up energy production on federal land and eliminated proposed carbon restrictions.

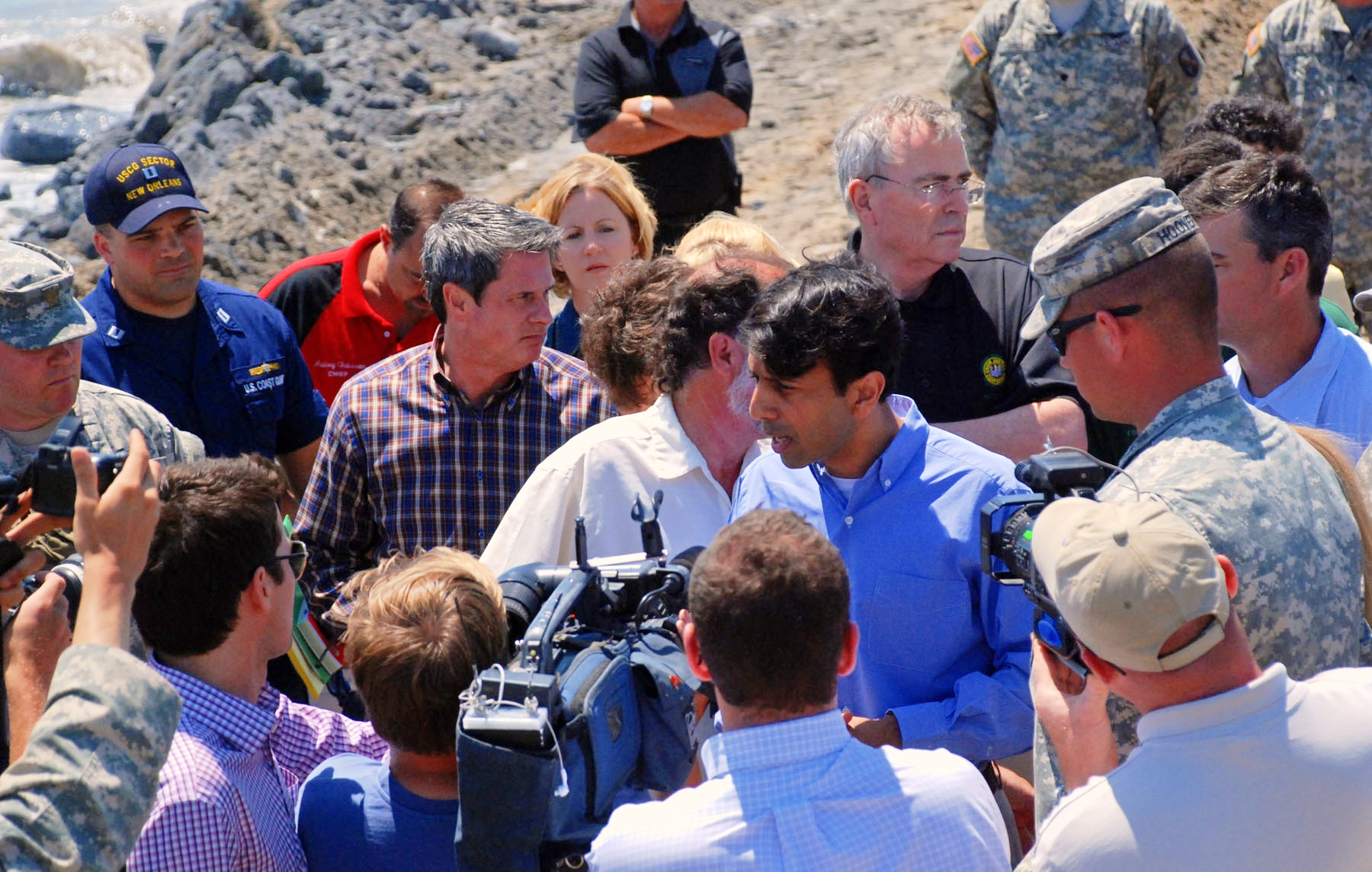
Governor Jindal and local officials discuss the operations in response to the 2010 Gulf of Mexico oil spill.

== Business career ==
In 2017, Jindal took a position as an operating adviser for Ares Management, a global investment firm based in Los Angeles.

In September 2022, telehealth company LifeMD (NASDAQ:LFMD) named Jindal to its board of directors.

== National politics ==
=== Speculation about 2008 vice presidential nomination ===
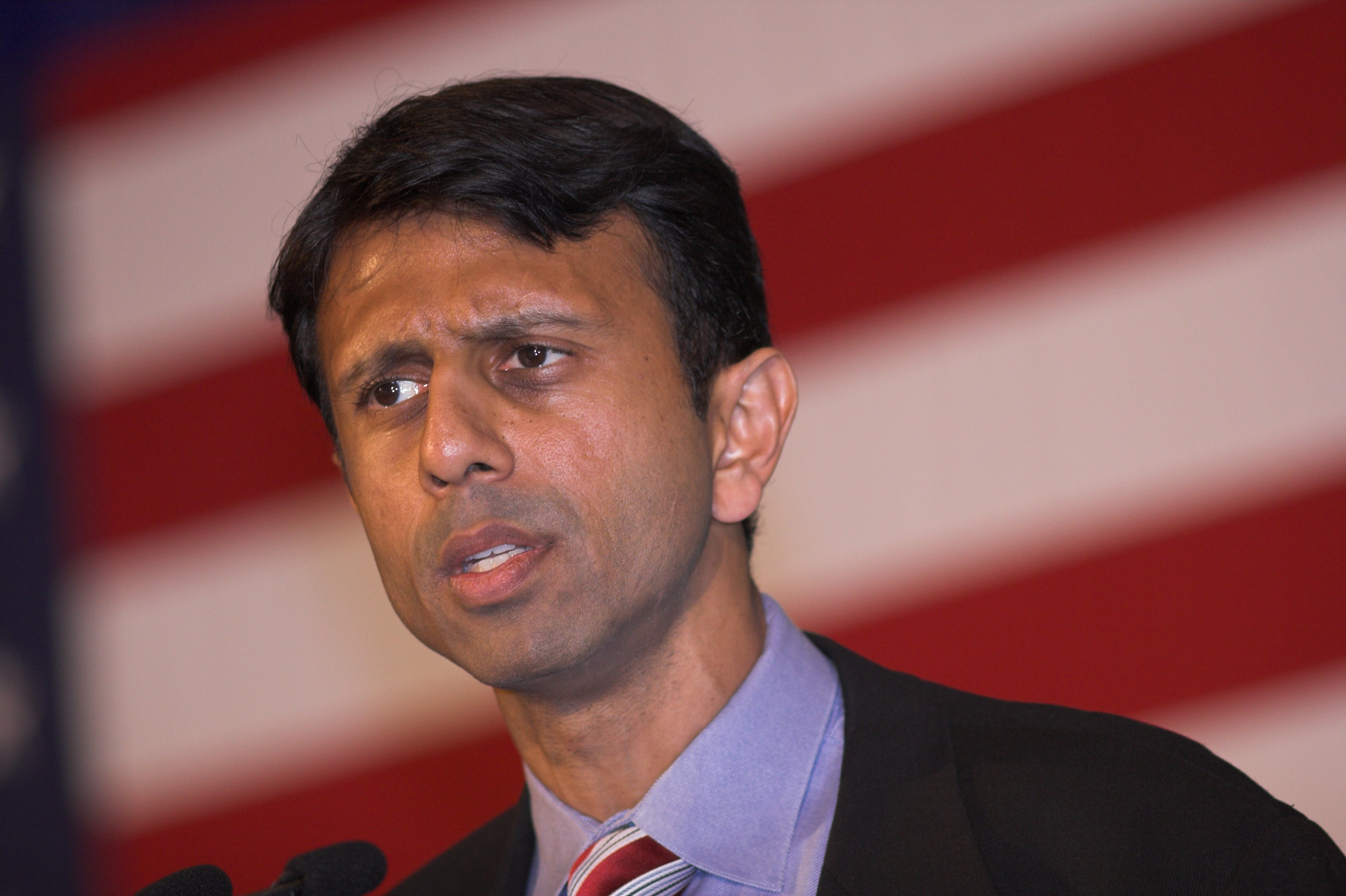
Jindal in June 2008, at a John McCain campaign event in Kenner, Louisiana

On February 8, 2008, conservative radio host Rush Limbaugh mentioned on his syndicated show that Jindal could be a possible choice for the Republican vice presidential nomination in 2008. He said that Jindal might be perceived as an asset to John McCain's campaign because he has wide support in the conservative and moderate wings of the Republican Party. If McCain had won the presidency, he would have been the oldest president ever inaugurated to a first term.

Heightening the speculation, McCain invited Jindal, Governor Charlie Crist of Florida, and his former rival Mitt Romney to meet at his home in Arizona on May 23, 2008, according to a Republican familiar with the decision. The meeting may have served a different purpose, such as consideration of Jindal for the opportunity to speak at the 2008 Republican National Convention, in a similar fashion to Barack Obama at the 2004 Democratic National Convention, cementing a place for him in the party and opening the gate for a future run for the presidency. Speculation was fueled by simultaneous July 21, 2008, reports that McCain was making a sudden visit to Louisiana to confer again with Jindal and that McCain was readying to name his running mate within a week. However, on July 23, 2008, Jindal said that he would not be the Republican vice presidential nominee in 2008. Jindal added that he "never talked to the senator [McCain] about the vice presidency or his thoughts on selecting the vice president." Ultimately, on August 29, 2008, McCain chose then-Gov. Sarah Palin of Alaska as his running mate. While Jindal was given a prime-time speech slot at the party convention, he was not offered the keynote speech. During the presidential campaign, Jindal expressed admiration for both Senators McCain and Obama, and maintained that both have made positive contributions to the nation.

=== Republican response to President Obama's address to Congress ===
On February 24, 2009, Jindal delivered the official Republican response to President Obama's address to a joint session of Congress. Jindal called the president's economic stimulus plan "irresponsible" and argued against government intervention. He used Hurricane Katrina to warn against government solutions to the economic crisis. "Today in Washington, some are promising that government will rescue us from the economic storms raging all around us," Jindal said. "Those of us who lived through Hurricane Katrina, we have our doubts." He praised the late sheriff Harry Lee for standing up to the government during Katrina.

The speech met with biting reviews from some members of both the Democratic and the Republican parties. Referring to Jindal as "devoid of substantive ideas for governing the country", political commentator Rachel Maddow summarized Jindal's Katrina remark as follows: "[Jindal states that] since government failed during Hurricane Katrina, we should understand, not that government should not be allowed to fail again, but that government...never works. That government can't work, and therefore we should stop seeking a functioning government." David Johnson, a Republican political strategist criticized Jindal's mention of Hurricane Katrina, stating "The one thing Republicans want to forget is Katrina." While Jindal's speech was poorly received by several Democratic and Republican critics, others argued that the speech should be judged on substance rather than delivery style.

Jindal's story of meeting Lee in the immediate aftermath of Hurricane Katrina was questioned following the speech, as Jindal was not in New Orleans at the time. On February 27, 2009, a spokesman for Jindal clarified the timing of the meeting, stating that the story took place days after the storm. The opportunity to give the response to President Obama's speech was compared by some commentators to winning "second prize in a beauty contest", a reference to the board game Monopoly.

=== 2012 presidential election ===
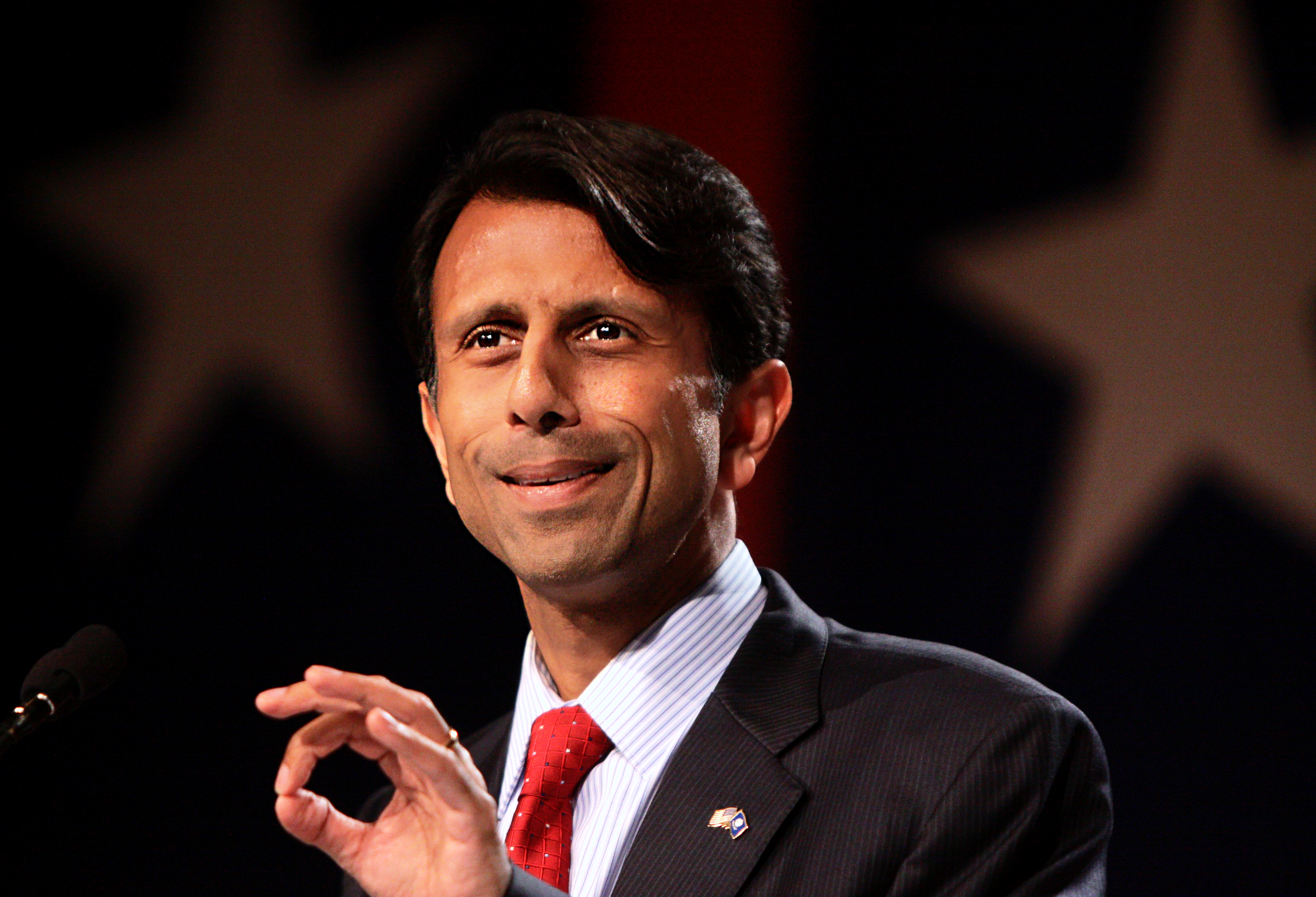
Governor Jindal speaking at the 2011 Values Voter Summit in Washington, D.C.

Jindal had been mentioned as a potential candidate for the 2012 presidential election. On December 10, 2008, Jindal indicated that he would likely not run for president in 2012, saying he will focus on his re-election in 2011 and that this would make transitioning to a national campaign difficult, though he did not rule out a possible 2012 presidential bid. Speculation increased when Republicans chose Jindal to deliver the response to President Obama's first address to a joint session of Congress.

The Jindal for President Draft Council Inc. PAC was formed in 2009 to raise funds for a future presidential run. Jindal has stated that he has no involvement with the PAC. In April 2010, while speaking at the Southern Republican Leadership Conference, Jindal ruled out running for the Republican nomination for president in 2012.

In 2012, Jindal traveled across the country in support of the Mitt Romney-Paul Ryan ticket. Because Louisiana and other Deep South states voted heavily for the GOP, Jindal could hence devote his campaign time elsewhere. In August 2012, Politico reported that "Bobby Jindal would be considered [for] and would likely take" appointment as United States Secretary of Health and Human Services in a potential Romney cabinet.

After the defeat of Romney-Ryan, Jindal called for his party to return to "the basics... If we want people to like us, we have to like them first," he said on the interview program Fox News Sunday. As the incoming president of the Republican Governors Association, which had thirty members in 2013, Jindal questioned Romney for having criticized President Obama as having provided "extraordinary financial gifts from the government". In reply to Romney, Jindal said, "You don't start to like people by insulting them and saying their votes were bought." Jindal said that his party must convince a majority of voters that it supports the middle class and the principle of upward mobility. He also criticized what he termed "stupid" remarks regarding rape and conception made in 2012 by defeated Republican U.S. Senate nominees Todd Akin in Missouri and Richard Mourdock in Indiana.

=== 2016 presidential candidacy ===
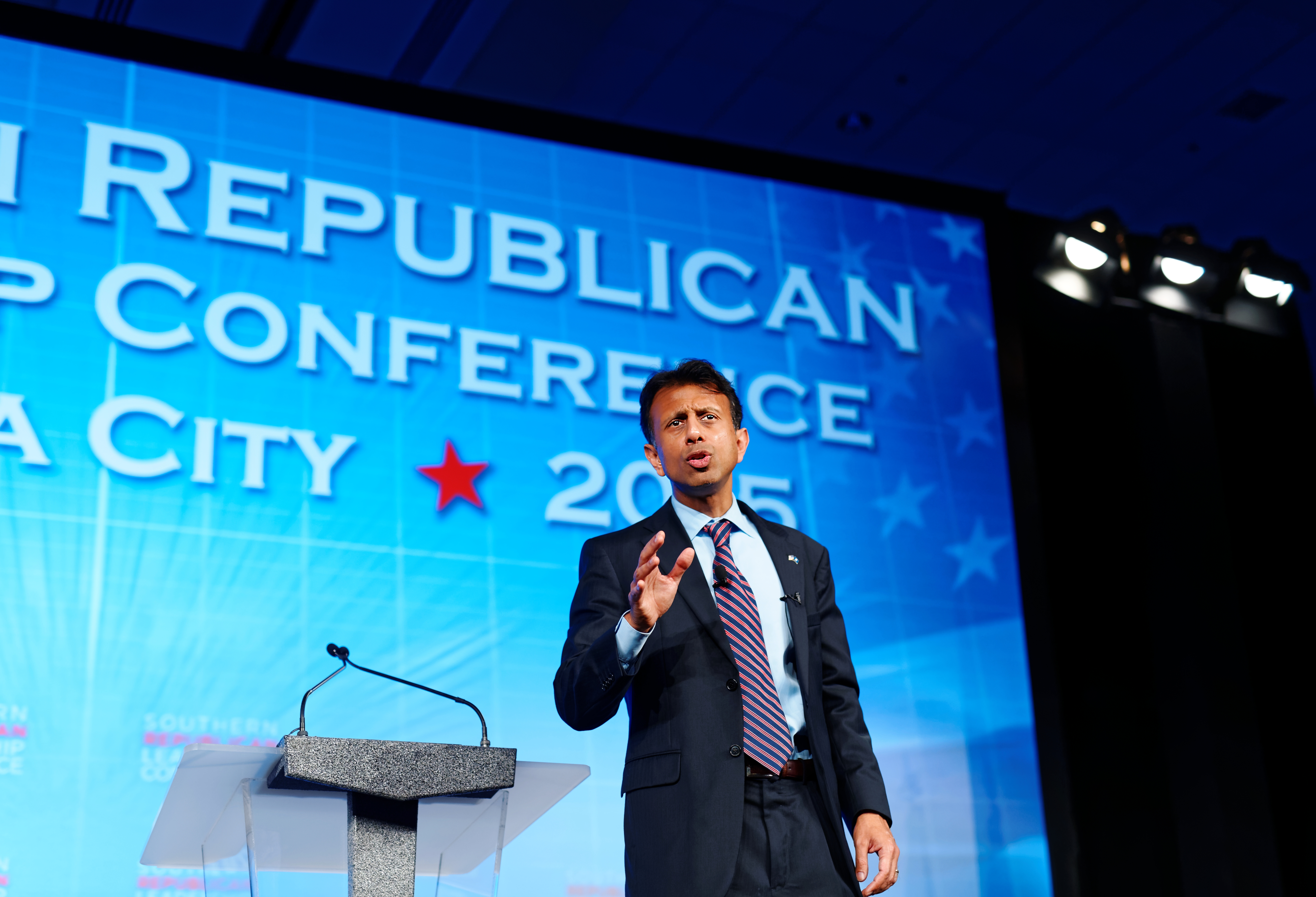
Governor Jindal at 2015 Southern Republican Leadership Conference, Oklahoma City, OK

In November 2012, after the election, Jindal was featured in a Time magazine article titled "2016: Let's Get The Party Started", where he was listed as a possible Republican candidate for the presidency in 2016. The article cited his fiscal and social conservative policies and his Indian American background, which would bring diversity to the GOP.

In 2013, with polls showing Jindal's approval ratings in Louisiana falling significantly, some analysts wrote off Jindal as a serious national contender, though others pointed to Romney as an example of someone who still won the Presidential nomination despite poor approval ratings from his home state. In October 2013, Jindal told Fox News Sunday that he was still mulling a 2016 presidential run.

On May 18, 2015, Jindal formed a presidential exploratory committee to determine whether he would run as a candidate in the 2016 presidential election, and he announced his candidacy on June 24.

As of early September, Jindal was polling at 1 percent among the Republican primary electorate. On November 17, 2015, Jindal appeared on Special Report with Bret Baier on the Fox News Channel, announcing that he was ending his run for president, saying "I've come to the realization that this is not my time."

During his campaign, Jindal called Donald Trump a "narcissist" and an "egomaniacal madman", but afterward said that he would support Trump because "electing Donald Trump would be the second-worst thing we could do this November, better only than electing Hillary Clinton to serve as the third term for the Obama administration's radical policies."

== Political positions ==
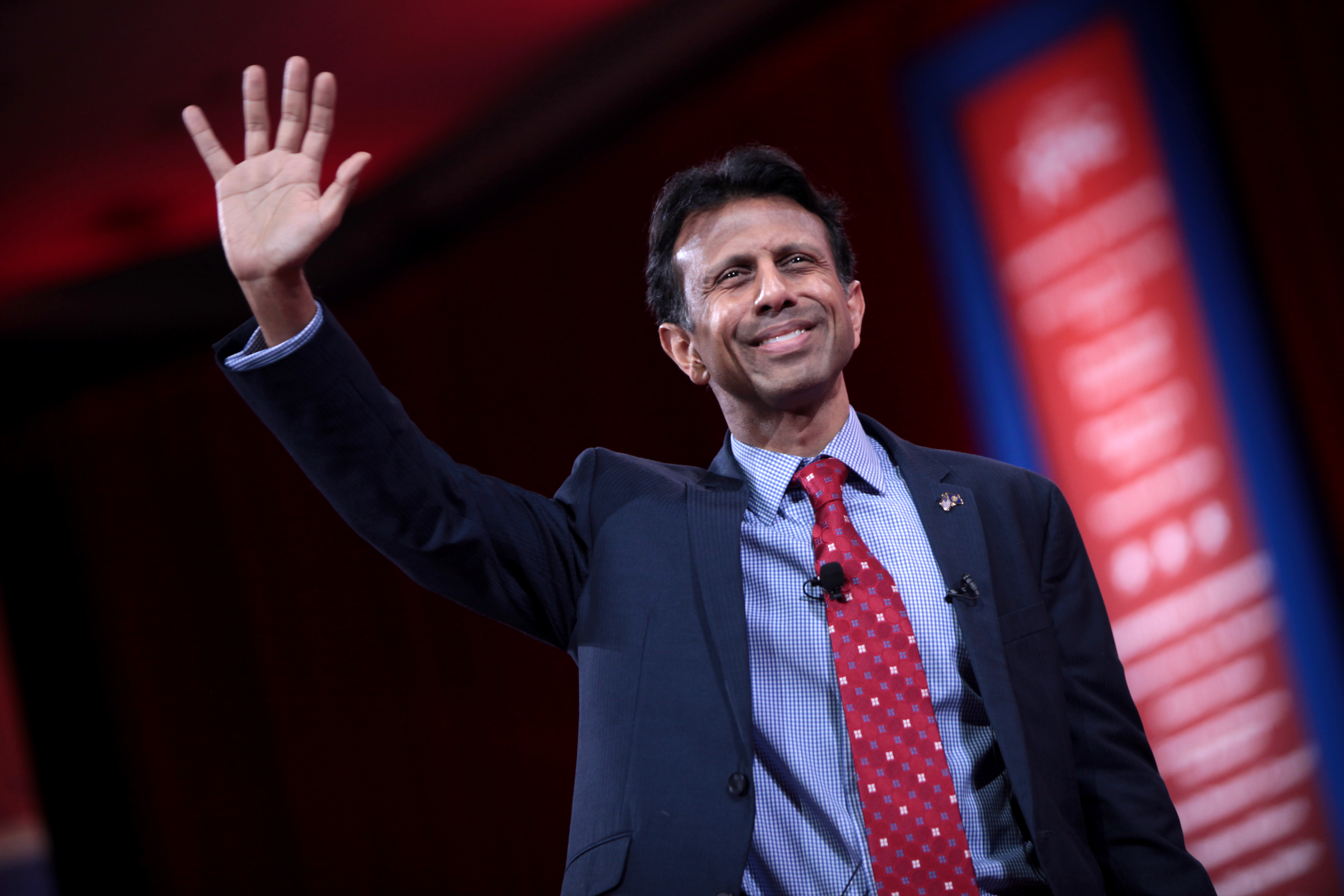
Bobby Jindal speaking at the 2015 Conservative Political Action Conference (CPAC) in National Harbor, Maryland on February 26, 2015

=== Abortion and embryonic stem cell research ===
Jindal has a strongly anti-abortion voting record according to the National Right to Life Committee. He opposes abortion in general, but does not condemn medical procedures aimed at saving the life of the mother that indirectly result in the loss of the unborn child, such as salpingectomy for an ectopic pregnancy.

In 2003, Jindal stated that he did not object to the use of emergency contraception in the case of rape if the victim requests it. While in the House of Representatives, he supported two bills to prohibit transporting minors across state lines to obtain an abortion; the bills aimed to prevent doctors and others from helping a minor avoid parental notification laws in their home state by procuring an abortion in another state. He opposed and voted against expanding public funding of embryonic stem cell research.

=== Same-sex marriage ===
Jindal opposed the legalization of both same-sex marriage and civil unions. In Congress, he voted for the Federal Marriage Amendment to restrict marriage to a union between one man and one woman. He also voted against the Local Law Enforcement Hate Crimes Prevention Act of 2007. In December 2008, Jindal announced the formation of the Louisiana Commission on Marriage and Family.

Following the 2013 Supreme Court's rulings on DOMA and Proposition 8, he said: "I believe every child deserves a mom and a dad. This opinion leaves the matter of marriage to the states where people can decide. In Louisiana, we will opt for traditional marriage. How about we let the people decide for themselves, via their representatives and via referendum?".

==== Marriage and Conscience Act ====
In May 2015, the legislature killed the measure. Four Republican members, Pete Huval of Breaux Bridge, Gregory A. Miller of Norco, Clay Schexnayder of Gonzales, and Nancy Landry of Lafayette, joined Democrats in killing the bill. Jindal responded by issuing Executive Order BJ-2015-8, (the "Marriage and Conscience Order"), which attempted to achieve the goals of the failed legislation. Johnson said he intended to re-introduce the measure in 2016.

=== Government ethics ===
He vetoed state legislation to increase pay for state legislators. However, the Louisiana governor's office was ranked last for transparency in the United States both prior, and subsequent, to Jindal's election, as reported by the WDSU I-Team. At least two legislators, state representatives Walker Hines and Neil Abramson, argued that this may be attributed to legislation that removed the governor's records from the public domain; they argued that the legislation was surreptitiously inserted as a last-minute amendment into an education bill by Jindal's office on the last day of the 2008 session, providing no time to properly review it before it passed the legislature and was signed into law by Jindal.

=== Gun rights and gun control ===
Jindal is a fervent supporter of the Second Amendment and generally opposes gun control. He has been endorsed by the NRA Political Victory Fund and received an A grade from Gun Owners of America while he was in Congress.

As a Congressman, he sponsored the Disaster Recovery Personal Protection Act of 2006 with Senator David Vitter.

In July 2015, during an interview with CBS, Jindal stated that he supported stricter background checks, and that every state should begin to enact tougher background checks on gun buyers.

=== Tax policy ===
As a private citizen, Jindal voted in 2002 for the Louisiana constitutional amendment known as the Stelly Plan which lowered some sales taxes in exchange for higher income taxes. After taking office, Jindal cut taxes a total of six times, including the largest income tax cut in Louisiana's history – a cut of $1.1 billion over five years, along with accelerating the elimination of the tax on business investments. In January 2013, Jindal said he wanted to eliminate all Louisiana corporate and personal income taxes, without giving details for his proposal.

As U.S. Representative from Louisiana, Jindal received grades of B in 2005, B− in 2006, and C in 2007 from the National Taxpayers Union, a conservative taxpayers advocacy organization. As Governor of Louisiana, Jindal received grades of A in 2010, B in 2012, and B in 2014 from the Cato Institute, a libertarian think tank, in their biennial Fiscal Policy Report Card on America's Governors.

=== Education ===
In 2008, Jindal came out in favour of the Common Core State Standards Initiative, which Louisiana adopted in 2010.

In 2014, Jindal wrote that "It has become fashionable in the news media to believe there is a right-wing conspiracy against Common Core."

Jindal proposed budgets that impose cuts on higher education funding in Louisiana, leading to protests from students and education advocates. Jindal proposed several controversial education reforms, including vouchers for low income students in public schools to attend private institutions using Minimum Foundation Program funds.

The legislation also included controversial changes in teacher evaluations, tenure and pensions. Hundreds of teachers, administrators and public education supporters protested against the legislation at the capital of Louisiana, some of whom cancelled classes to attend demonstrations. Many participants circulated petitions to recall Jindal and Republican House Speaker Chuck Kleckley. In April 2012, a Louisiana Public Broadcasting program examined possible conflicts between aspects of the Jindal education reform plan and the federal desegregation orders still in place in many parts of Louisiana.

==== Evolution ====
Jindal signed a law that permitted teachers at public schools to supplement standard evolutionary curricula with analysis and critiques that may include intelligent design. The law provides that "[c]lassroom instruction and materials shall not promote any religious doctrine", but Louisiana ACLU Director Marjorie Esman said that that provision "is vague at best", and stated that the Act is "susceptible to a constitutional challenge." Despite calls for a veto from John Derbyshire and some genetics professors at Brown University, Jindal signed the Louisiana Academic Freedom Act which passed the voting in the State House and the State Senate in 2008.

The Society for Integrative and Comparative Biology rejected New Orleans as a site for their 2010 meeting and the American Society for Biochemistry and Molecular Biology will not conduct future meetings in Louisiana.

=== Civil liberties ===
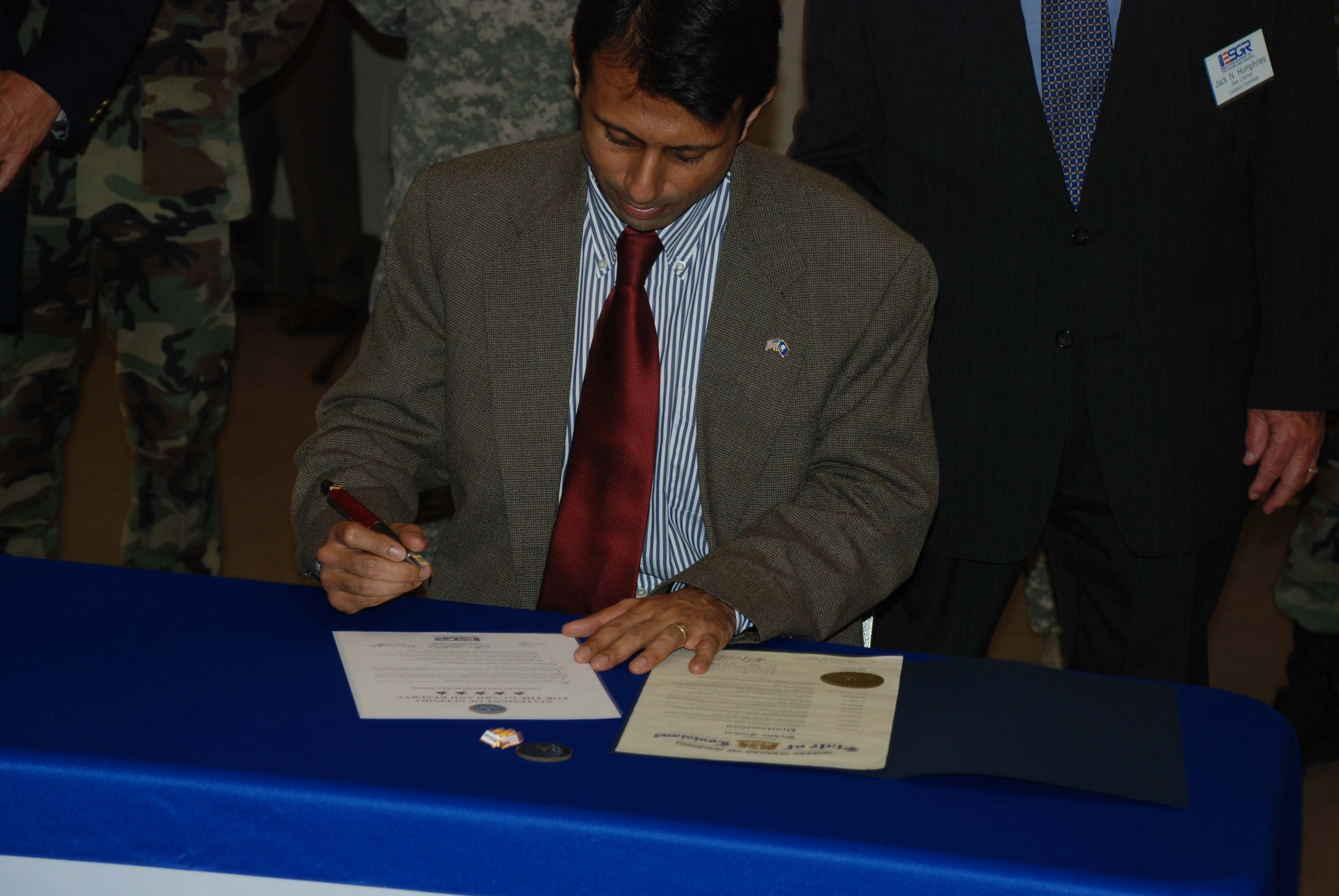
Gov. Bobby Jindal signs a Five-Star Statement of Support for Employer Support of the Guard and Reserve at Camp Beauregard on October 14, 2008. The document signing was an opportunity to join employers from across the country in supporting Soldiers.

Jindal voted to extend the Patriot Act, voted in favor of the Military Commissions Act of 2006, supported a constitutional amendment banning flag burning, and voted for the Real ID Act of 2005.

=== Immigration laws ===
He criticized illegal immigration as a drain on the economy, as well as being unfair to those who entered the country by legal means. He voted to build a fence along the Mexican border and opposed granting amnesty for illegal immigrants.

=== Health care ===
Jindal refused to accept federal funds to expand Medicaid after the passage of the Affordable Care Act. The Commonwealth Fund released a study saying that this decision cost Louisiana $1.65 billion in federal health care assistance. He supported increased health insurance portability; laws promoting coverage of pre-existing medical conditions; a cap on malpractice lawsuits; an easing of restrictions on importation of prescription medications; the implementation of a streamlined electronic medical records system; an emphasis on preventative care rather than emergency room care; and tax benefits aimed at making health insurance more affordable for the uninsured and targeted to promote universal access. He opposed a federal government-run, single-payer system, but supported state efforts to reduce the uninsured population. He has also supported expanding services for autistic children, and promoted a national childhood cancer database. Due to a congressional reduction in federal Medicaid financing rates, the Jindal administration chose to levy the largest slice of cuts on the network of LSU charity hospitals and clinics, requiring some facilities to close.

=== Environmental issues and offshore drilling ===
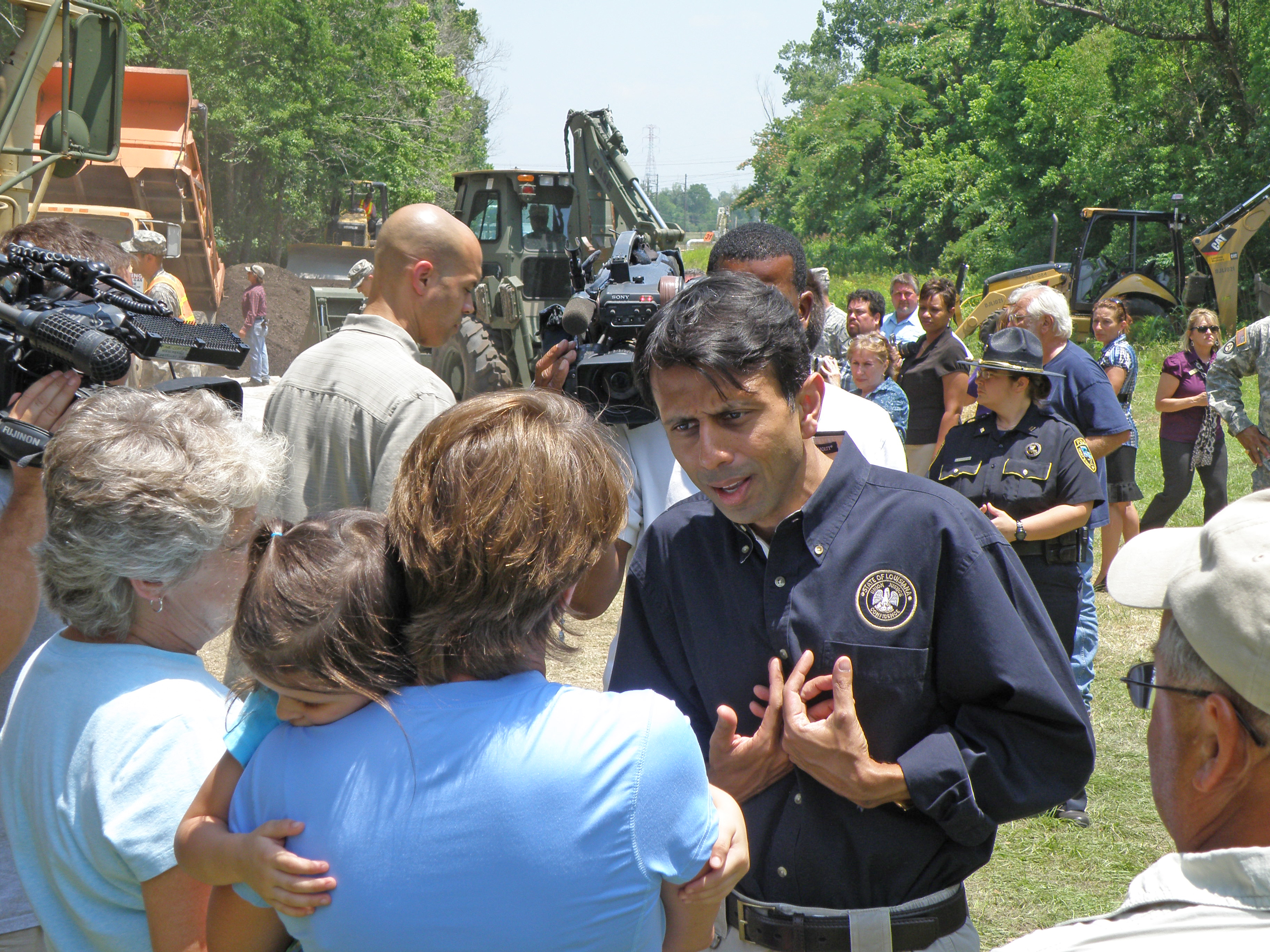
Jindal talks to residents of Krotz Springs, Louisiana, during the 2011 flooding of the Mississippi River.

Jindal issued an executive order increasing office recycling programs, reducing solid waste and promoting paperless practices, offering tax credit for hybrid fuel vehicles, increasing average fuel economy goals by 2010, as well as increasing energy efficiency goals and standards for the state. He has stated his opposition to and voted for the criminalization of oil cartels such as OPEC. As a representative in the House, he supported a $300-million bill to fund Louisiana coastal restoration. In addition, he was the chief sponsor of successful legislation to expand the Jean Lafitte National Historical Park by over 3,000 acres (12 km^{2}). Jindal signed bill SB 469 that would limit actions aimed at oil and gas companies operating along the coast. Jindal pledged state support for the development of economically friendly cars in northeastern Louisiana in conjunction with alternative energy advocate T. Boone Pickens. In September 2014, Jindal stated that global warming was more about increasing government regulation, and released an energy plan that was critical of the Obama Administration's policies.

=== Earmarks ===
As governor, in 2008, Jindal used his line item veto to strike $16 million in earmarks from the state budget but declined to veto $30 million in legislator-added spending. Jindal vetoed over 250 earmarks in the 2008 state budget, twice the total number of such vetoes by previous governors in the preceding 12 years.

=== Opposition to Recovery Act ===
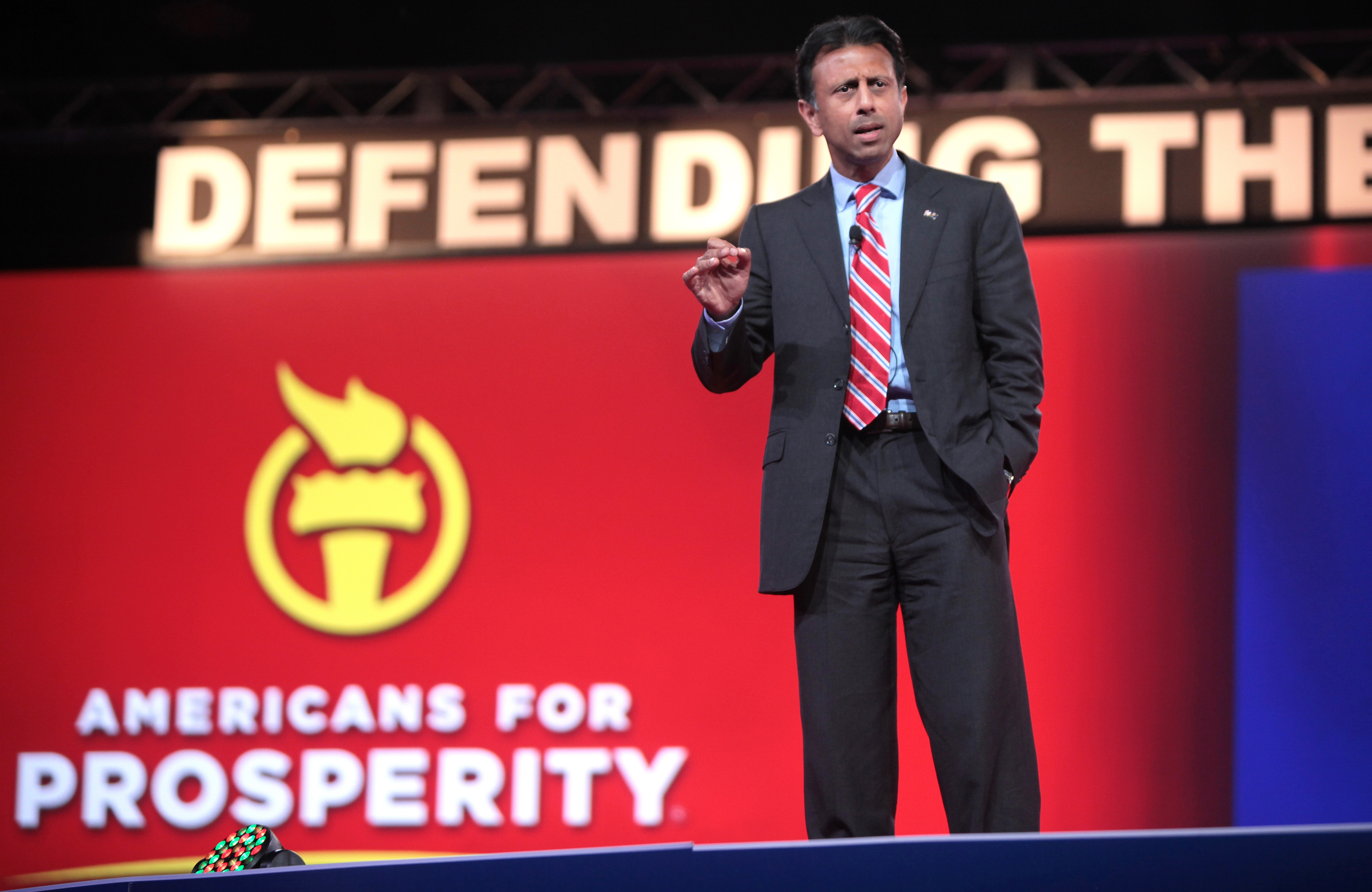
Governor Jindal at the 2015 Defending the American Dream Summit

Jindal has been an opponent of the American Recovery and Reinvestment Act of 2009. Citing concerns that the augmentation of unemployment insurance may obligate the state to raise taxes on businesses, Jindal had indicated his intention to forgo federal stimulus plan funds ($98 million) aimed at increasing unemployment insurance for Louisiana. Louisiana has since been obligated to raise taxes on businesses because the unemployment trust fund had dropped below the prescribed threshold. Louisiana was set to receive about $3.8 billion overall. Jindal intended to accept at least $2.4 billion from the stimulus package. He called parts of the plan "irresponsible", saying that "the way to lead is not to raise taxes and put more money and power in hands of Washington politicians."

=== No-go zones ===
In 2015, Jindal traveled to the UK to speak at an event hosted by the Henry Jackson Society. According to Salon.com, in his speech Jindal alleged the existence of "no-go zones", areas established by Muslims in London and other western cities. London mayor Boris Johnson called Jindal's remarks "complete nonsense" and former British Prime Minister David Cameron said there were not any no-go zones in the UK. Jindal later said "I knew that by speaking the truth we were going to make people upset." When later asked by CNN to provide specific examples, Jindal declined. He later added that some Muslim immigrants are trying to "colonize" cities in Europe and "overtake the culture", and that it could happen next in the U.S.

== Personal life ==
Jindal was raised in a Hindu household. He is of Indian descent and is a U.S. citizen by birthright. He converted to Christianity while in Baton Rouge Magnet High School. During his first year at Brown University, he was baptized into the Catholic Church as an adult under the Rite of Christian Initiation of Adults (RCIA).

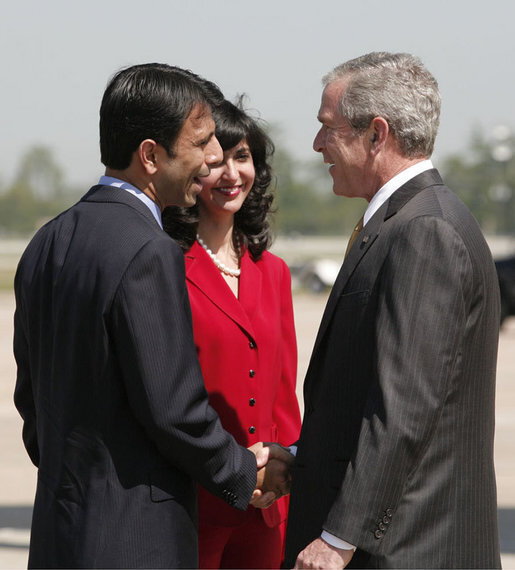
Bobby and Supriya Jolly Jindal meet with then-President George W. Bush

Before Jindal was born, his father Amar Jindal was assistant professor of engineering at Panjab University in Chandigarh. After settling into Louisiana, Jindal's father went on to work with a Louisiana railroad company, and his mother transitioned into Information Technology (IT). As of 2008, Jindal's mother, Raj Jindal, was information technology director for the Louisiana Workforce Commission (formerly the Louisiana Department of Labor) and served as Assistant Secretary to former State Labor Secretary Garey Forster during the administration of Governor Mike Foster. Jindal has a younger brother, Nikesh, who is a registered Republican and supported his brother's campaign for governor. Nikesh went to Dartmouth College, where he graduated with honors, and then Yale Law School. Nikesh is now a lawyer in Washington, D.C.

Jindal's nickname dates to his childhood identification with Bobby Brady, a character from the 1970s sitcom The Brady Bunch. He has been known by his nickname ever since, although his legal name remains Piyush Jindal.

In 1997, Jindal married Supriya Jolly, who was born in New Delhi, India, and moved to Baton Rouge when she was 4 years old. The two attended the same high school, but Supriya's family moved from Baton Rouge to New Orleans after her freshman year. Supriya Jindal earned a bachelor's degree in chemical engineering and an M.B.A. degree from Tulane University. She created The Supriya Jindal Foundation for Louisiana's Children, a non-profit organization aimed at improving math and science education in grade schools.

The Jindals have three children: Selia Elizabeth, Shaan Robert, and Slade Ryan. Shaan was born with a congenital heart defect and had surgery as an infant. The Jindals have been outspoken advocates for children with congenital defects, particularly those without insurance. In 2006, he assisted as his wife delivered their third child at home, with him receiving medical coaching by phone to deliver their boy.

Jindal enjoys hunting in Louisiana.

== See also ==
- List of Asian Americans and Pacific Islands Americans in the United States Congress
- List of minority governors and lieutenant governors in the United States
- Republican Party presidential candidates, 2016

Party political offices
| Preceded by Mike Foster | Republican nominee for Governor of Louisiana; 2003, 2007, 2011 | Succeeded by David Vitter |
| Preceded by Kathleen Sebelius | Response to the State of the Union address 2009 | Succeeded by Bob McDonnell |
| Preceded by Bob McDonnell | Chair of the Republican Governors Association; 2012–2013 | Succeeded by Chris Christie |
U.S. House of Representatives
| Preceded by David Vitter | Member of the U.S. House of Representatives from Louisiana's 1st congressional district 2005–2008 | Succeeded by Steve Scalise |
Political offices
| Preceded by Kathleen Blanco | Governor of Louisiana; 2008–2016 | Succeeded by John Bel Edwards |
U.S. order of precedence (ceremonial)
| Preceded by Martha McSally as Former U.S. Senator | Order of precedence of the United States; Within Louisiana | Succeeded by John Bel Edwards as Former Governor |
| Preceded by John Kasich as Former Governor | Order of precedence of the United States; Outside Louisiana | Succeeded by John Bel Edwards as Former Governor |
