= Minimum Foundation Program =

Public school funding formula in Louisiana

In Louisiana, the Minimum Foundation Program is the formula that determines the cost to educate students at public elementary and secondary schools and defines state and local funding contributions to each district. Education officials often use the term "MFP" to refer specifically to the portion the state pays per student to each school district.

The Louisiana Board of Elementary and Secondary Education (BESE) is required by the Louisiana Constitution to adopt a formula to determine the total cost of a minimum foundation program of education in public schools and to equitably allocate funding to school systems. The Louisiana legislature must approve the formula each year. Local and state contributions to the MFP vary based on student needs and local tax bases.

MFP funding has been frozen at the same rate for two years. In 2010, the Louisiana Legislature moved to restructure the MFP formula. Critics say the formula does not encourage districts to implement taxes to pay higher amounts than the state for the cost of education.

== Local and state contributions ==
Local and state shares of the MFP vary from district to district. On average, the state pays 65 percent of the total cost of the minimum foundation, and the district pays 35 percent. In the 2010-2011 fiscal year, state and local government contributed $3.3 billion to the MFP formula. Required local funding is paid by property and sales taxes levied by local school districts. Districts with higher tax revenues must pay a higher portion of the MFP than districts with lower tax revenues. The formula divides districts into levels based on the dollar amount of taxes they levy.

=== Per student spending ===
In 2010-2011, the base MFP formula was $3,855 per pupil, without accounting for special student needs. The MFP formula also takes into account the additional expenses school systems incur in educating special classes of students (e.g. at risk, special education and gifted and talented students.) In the end, school districts get an average of about $10,000 of state and local funding per student per year.

Local and state sources spent between $6,500 and $10,700 per student during the 2008-2009 fiscal year. In that year, Allen, Assumption, Claiborne, Madison, Plaquemines, Red River and West Feliciana parishes received the highest per pupil funding while Acadia, Avoyelles, Grant and Vermillion parishes received the lowest per pupil funding. Among the 10 districts with the highest MFP per pupil that year, the average local contribution was $3,900, and the average state contribution was $6,050. Among the 10 districts with the lowest MFP per pupil that year, the average local contribution was $1,850 and the average state contribution was $5,600. Total funding levels per student vary based on student population needs.

== Weighted formula ==
MFP funding in the 2010-2011 fiscal year totaled $3,308,741,821. That amount divided evenly among 696,444 public school students in Louisiana would work out to $4,750 per pupil. But some students cost more to educate than others. Rather than increasing the dollar amount, the MFP formula artificially increases the number of students it funds. This "weighted membership" accounts for special education, gifted and talented and at-risk students. For example, a school receives 2.5 times the amount of funding it would receive for a general population student to educate a special education student.

== State executive and legislative action ==
=== MFP freeze ===
In the past, the Louisiana Department of Education factored in a 2.75 percent increase per year in MFP funding, but that increase has been frozen for two years. In February, 2011, The Advocate reported that Gov. Bobby Jindal plans to freeze the increase in MFP funding for the 2012 budget. John Sartin, president of the Louisiana Association of School Superintendents, said districts need the MFP growth factor because they have suffered downturns in local sales tax revenue and increases in retirement and health insurance costs.

=== Move to restructure ===
In 2010, the Louisiana House of Representatives passed a resolution urging the Louisiana Board of Elementary and Secondary Education to make the school funding formula more efficient and effective. HCR 20, introduced by Rep. Steve Carter, requested that BESE make certain changes to the formula, including:

1. Increasing the percentage of MFP funds spent at the school level
2. Having funds "follow the child" when students are transferred to juvenile justice facilities
3. Adjusting funding (up or down) based on accurate student enrollment data
4. Targeting more MFP funds to dropout prevention

== District taxing controversy ==
Critics say the MFP formula discourages high levels of local, rather than state, funding. Louisiana House Speaker Jim Tucker said in an interview with Louisiana Public Broadcasting that the MFP formula keeps districts from levying higher taxes because districts with high local taxes receive lower state funding payments. Tulane University's Cowen Institute was founded in 2007 to examine the effects of local tax initiatives on the MFP. Tara O'Neill, Cowen Institute Policy Manager, said districts receive extra incentive funding from the state when they raise high amounts of funding at the local level. O'Neill said districts get this extra money whether they tax a low tax base at a high rate or tax a healthy tax base at a low rate.

== MFP Accountability Reports for low-performing schools ==
State laws require the Louisiana Department of Education to include each local school district that has a school with a School Performance Score (SPS) below 60 and growth of less than 2 points in an MFP Accountability Report that is submitted to the Louisiana House and Senate Committees on Education by June 1 each year.

The most recent report in 2009 contained data for 34 schools in 15 districts during the 2007-2008 school year. The average school performance score for schools in that report was 52.9, compared to 86.3 statewide. The average classroom instructional expenditure per student was $6,416 among these schools, compared to $5,924 statewide. About 91 percent of students in this report were in poverty, compared to 63.2 percent statewide. The schools in this report had higher teacher turnover than the statewide average and a slightly higher percentage of uncertified teachers than the state average.
