= Walter Boasso =

American politician (born 1960)

Member of the Louisiana Senate from the 1st district
- In office 2004–2008
- Preceded by: Lynn Dean
- Succeeded by: A. G. Crowe

Personal details
- Born: Walter Joseph Boasso; May 10, 1960 (age 66) Arabi, Louisiana, U.S.
- Party: Democratic (Before mid-1990s; 2007–present)
- Other political affiliations: Republican (mid-1990s-2007)
- Education: University of New Orleans (BBA)

Walter Joseph Boasso (born May 10, 1960) is an American businessman and Democratic former state senator from Chalmette, the seat of government of St. Bernard Parish in south Louisiana. He was defeated in a bid for governor in the October 20, 2007, nonpartisan blanket primary by the Republican Bobby Jindal. Boasso won 47 percent in his own St. Bernard Parish, his sole plurality showing in any of his state's sixty-four parishes. From 2004 to 2008, Boasso represented Senate District 1, which includes parts of Orleans, Plaquemines, St. Bernard, and St. Tammany parishes, many of those areas having been devastated by Hurricane Katrina.

== Biography ==
A lifelong resident of St. Bernard Parish, Boasso graduated from Chalmette High School in 1978. He obtained a Bachelor of Business Administration from the University of New Orleans. He launched his own company cleaning storage tanks during summer vacations. He soon established a large corporation, Boasso America. The company is still headquartered in St. Bernard Parish and employs hundreds of people in several states. He described the business as having started "with a brush and a bucket of Tide." Boasso America Corp., was sold to a Florida company, Quality Distribution, Inc. at a profit of $60 million. The company maintains its presence in South Louisiana.

== Business career ==
Boasso founded a tank and container-cleaning business in St. Bernard Parish while still a student, later expanding it into Boasso America Corporation, a tank-container and depot services company based in the New Orleans area.

In mid-2007, Quality Distribution, Inc. acquired Boasso America. Industry reporting described the deal as a major expansion of Quality Distribution’s tank-container network.

During the 2007 gubernatorial campaign, Boasso frequently referenced the company’s origin story in advertising and interviews as part of his public image.

== Political career ==
Originally a Democrat, Boasso switched to the Republican Party in the mid 1990s. He was selected as the chairman of the Port of New Orleans Authority Board of Commissioners in 2001 and to the state Senate in 2003.

On February 6, 2007, Boasso announced his plans to run in the primary for the governor. He faced opposition from the Republican U.S. Representative Bobby Jindal, who then represented Louisiana's 1st congressional district in suburban New Orleans. After the decision by Louisiana Republicans to endorse Jindal, Boasso was approached about running for governor as a Democrat.

To that end, on April 26, 2007, Boasso formally switched parties again. In addition to Jindal, he was forced to contend with rival Democrat Foster Campbell, of Bossier City in Bossier Parish, a member of the Louisiana Public Service Commission. Campbell ran again for statewide office in 2016, when the lost a race for the United States Senate seat vacated by Republican David Vitter to another Republican, John Neely Kennedy, the former Louisiana state treasurer.

== Hurricane Katrina ==
Boasso was hailed for his response to the disaster that struck his constituents on the morning of August 29, 2005. Katrina sent a tidal surge of up to 25–30 feet in height that drowned St. Bernard Parish in a matter of minutes. Boasso was in Baton Rouge at the time, and on being advised of the situation returned to the parish before the winds had completely died. He spent the following weeks bringing supplies, including fuel, food, medicines, and transportation to the parish. Many local residents said that Boasso and Democratic then U.S. Representative Charlie Melancon of Louisiana's 3rd congressional district were nearly the only source of help for his parish. Media coverage was aimed almost entirely at New Orleans alone. Boasso noted that rescuers from Canada were in the parish before any state response got there. Boasso has continued to push for assistance for St. Bernard Parish and has promised that Boasso America will continue to operate there.

== Legislation ==
Seven weeks after Hurricane Katrina, Boasso proposed SB95 that would eliminate seven local levee boards in Greater New Orleans and replace them with one board. His bill was heavily backed by local business leaders. The bill failed, but a similar version passed in a special session in early 2006. Before Katrina, the Governor selected levee board commissioners. After Boasso's bill passed, a local blue ribbon committee selects who serves.

== Electoral history ==
State Senator, 1st Senatorial District, 2003

Threshold > 50%

First Ballot, October 4, 2003

Candidate	Affiliation	Support	Outcome
Walter Boasso	Republican	19,842 (49%)	Runoff
Wayne J. Landry	Democratic	12,288 (30%)	Runoff
Wayne Mumphrey	Republican	8,538 (21%)	Defeated

Second Ballot, November 15, 2003

Candidate	Affiliation	Support	Outcome
Walter Boasso	Republican	25,233 (61%)	Elected
Wayne J. Landry	Democratic	16,011 (39%)	Defeated

Governor of Louisiana, 2007

Threshold > 50%

First Ballot, October 20, 2007

Candidate	Affiliation	Support	Outcome
Bobby Jindal	Republican	699,672 (54%)	Elected
Walter Boasso	Democratic	226,364 (17%)	Defeated
John Georges	Independent	186,800 (14%)	Defeated
Foster Campbell	Democratic	161,425 (12%)	Defeated
Others	n.a.	23,682 (3%)	Defeated

== See also ==
- List of American politicians who switched parties in office
- Louisiana gubernatorial election, 2007

Party political offices
Preceded by Kathleen Blanco	Democratic nominee for Governor of Louisiana; 2007	Succeeded by Tara Hollis
