= Foster Campbell =

American politician (born 1947)

Member of the Louisiana Public Service Commission from the 5th district
- Incumbent
- Assumed office January 1, 2003
- Preceded by: Don Owen

Member of the Louisiana Senate from the 36th district
- In office 1976–2002
- Preceded by: Harold Montgomery
- Succeeded by: Robert Adley

Personal details
- Born: Foster Lonnie Campbell Jr. January 6, 1947 (age 79) Shreveport, Louisiana, U.S.
- Party: Democratic
- Spouse(s): Paula Wright (divorced) Gwen Wilhite
- Children: 5 and 1 stepchild
- Education: Louisiana State University, Baton Rouge (attended); Northwestern State University (BA)

Foster Lonnie Campbell Jr. (born January 6, 1947) is an American politician and member of the Democratic Party from the U.S. state of Louisiana. Since 2003, he has been a member of the Louisiana Public Service Commission. He served in the Louisiana State Senate from 1976 to 2002.

He was an unsuccessful candidate for governor in the 2007 election against Republican Bobby Jindal. He ran unsuccessfully for the United States House of Representatives for Louisiana's 4th congressional district three times: in 1980, 1988, and 1990. In 2016, he was an unsuccessful candidate for the open U.S. Senate seat vacated by incumbent Republican David Vitter.

In 2012, Campbell became chairman of the five-member Public Service Commission. He was re-elected to a third term on the commission in 2014. He won a fourth six-year term as Louisiana Public Service Commissioner in 2020.

== Background ==
Campbell was born in Shreveport, the son of Foster Campbell Sr. and the former Rubye Grigsby of Bossier City, both deceased. He attended Bossier High School in Bossier City. Later, he graduated from Northwestern State University in Natchitoches. He also attended Louisiana State University in Baton Rouge. From 1972 to 1975, he was a school teacher in Haughton, Louisiana and an agricultural products salesman. Campbell owns two insurance agencies, both of which are located in Bossier City.

Campbell has six children from his first wife, Paula Wright, from whom he is divorced: Zach, Peter, Kate, Nicholas, Mary Claire, and Sarah Elizabeth. Zach died in Dallas, Texas at the age of thirty-seven. Campbell resides with his second wife, Gwen, in Elm Grove in south Bossier Parish, where he works as a farmer and cattleman.

In 2009, Campbell was inducted into the Louisiana Political Museum and Hall of Fame in Winnfield.

== State Senate career ==
In 1975, Campbell was elected to the Senate to succeed the retiring Conservative Democrat Harold Montgomery of Doyline in Webster Parish. In a runoff election, called the general election in Louisiana, Campbell handily defeated former Speaker of the Louisiana House of Representatives, John Sidney Garrett of Haynesville in northern Claiborne Parish, who failed in a political comeback attempt. During his Senate service, Campbell was often allied with Governor Edwin Washington Edwards and chaired the Select Committee on Consumer Affairs.

Campbell was sometimes at odds with Republican Governor David C. Treen, whom he claimed was aiming vetoes at projects in Campbell's senatorial district, including at one point a new roof for the Webster Parish Library in Minden, which years later built a new structure. In 1982, Treen rejected funding for an industrial pact sought by Campbell. In hopes of enticing labor-intensive industries to relocate to Louisiana, Campbell proposed to earmark $30 million from the oil and natural gas surplus trust fund. In 1983, Treen signed into law Campbell's bill to allow members of electric co-ops to come under Public Service Commission regulation. Under the law which Treen accepted after much wrangling, 20 percent of the membership must take part in any election in regard to enabling PSC jurisdiction over a utility company.

In 1985, Campbell as a state senator lobbied Democratic Governor Edwin Edwards, who was serving his third term at the time, to establish a savings account to support the newly established Bossier Educational Excellence Fund (BEEF). As a former teacher, Campbell proposed that the Bossier Parish school system share in tax revenue from the Louisiana Downs horse racetrack. The revenues were already being divided by other local governmental entities. Edwards said that the program should be called BEEF for the Wendy's restaurant refrain at the time: "Where's the Beef?" By 2018, what began as $500,000 in tax funds from Louisiana Downs had grown, with the addition of casino revenues, to a $50 million investment.

In 1992, State Senate President Sammy Nunez of Chalmette appointed Campbell as chairman of the Senate Agriculture Committee. Three years later, Nunez removed Campbell from the chairmanship of a committee established to consider a proposed oil and natural gas processing tax on foreign energy imports. Campbell criticized Nunez: "As a legislator for thirty years, he supported billions of dollars in new taxes, including taxes on food, drugs, and utilities. He finally found a tax he doesn't like." Nunez replied that the processing tax could cost the state critically needed jobs.

Over the years, Campbell easily won reelection to his Senate seat. In the nonpartisan blanket primary held on October 24, 1987, for instance, he polled 11,080 votes (70.2 percent) over two Democrats and a Republican opponent. Democrat (later Republican) Garland Mack Garrett, an oil company owner from Springhill born in 1942, trailed with 3,400 votes (21.5 percent). Ivan J. Edwards received 474 votes (3 percent), and Republican William F. "Bill" Lott, drew the remaining 835 ballots (5.3 percent) In 1995, his opponent, Webster Parish educator Ralph Lamar Rentz, a perennial candidate from Minden, died of a kidney ailment two days before the election. With Rentz's death, Campbell withdrew from his automatic victory, and a second election was called. Campbell then polled 21,652 votes (68 percent) to defeat three Republican candidates, Neil Fox, Roy Underwood, and Helaine George, who was a former unsuccessful candidate for the state House of Representatives against Democrat Everett Doerge. After this victory, Campbell eyed a run for the Senate presidency. Coincidentally, the day before Campbell's 1995 reelection, his predecessor in the office, Harold Montgomery, died. Campbell did not win the Senate presidency, however, the position went to neighboring colleague Randy L. Ewing of Quitman in Jackson Parish, who endorsed Campbell in the latter's 1995 state Senate race.

Campbell was an early critic of Republican Governor Mike Foster. He chastised the governor for refusal to keep schools open during the summer of 1996 and for other extended hours on the grounds that remediation services were needed in light of poor test scores for fourth graders. He also opposed Foster's proposed tax relief for the oil industry.

== Congressional campaigns ==
In 1988, Campbell narrowly lost the congressional race to a former Roemer aide, Republican Jim McCrery, a native and resident of Shreveport who was reared in Leesville. Roemer, however, was not supporting McCrery, but instead the Democrat Stanley R. Tiner, the former editor of the since defunct Shreveport Journal, a native of Webster Parish, and United States Marine veteran of the Vietnam War. During that special election campaign, triggered by Roemer's resignation to become governor, Campbell was seriously injured in a single vehicle car crash when he drove the wrong way down an unfinished, unopened section of Interstate 49 near Natchitoches. His car dropped more than a foot in a section where concrete was missing from the roadway. The accident left him blind in his right eye and with several broken facial bones. Campbell missed several days of campaigning and was forced to apologize for being on the closed highway: "I was wrong; that's all you can say. I made a mistake, and I'm paying for it."

In that 1988 race, Campbell was challenged about his support for Governor Edwin Edwards' $1 billion tax hike. Campbell said that he voted for less than a third of the tax increases Edwards sought: "I told him to cut the budget, and he didn't." Campbell ultimately lost to McCrery by some 1,500 votes, 50.2-49.8 percent. In 1990, Campbell made this third and final race for the U.S. House, but he was again defeated by McCrery, who solidified his hold on the district. (McCrery retired in January 2009 and was succeeded by the Republican John C. Fleming, a physician and businessman from Minden, who held the seat for eight years.)

== Public Service Commissioner (2003–present) ==
In 1984, Campbell considered running for the Public Service Commission when the two-term incumbent, Edward Kennon of Minden, stepped down, but he did not seek the position at that time.

In 2002, Campbell was elected from District 5 to the Public Service Commission, the statewide regulatory body in charge of public utilities and the petroleum industry. He narrowly unseated incumbent Donald Lynn "Don" Owen, a native Oklahoman and a former news anchorman for KSLA-TV, the CBS affiliate in Shreveport. Campbell prevailed with 123,749 votes (50.7 percent) to Owen's 120,413 (49.3 percent).

Campbell garnered 198,033 votes to Monroe Republican challenger Shane Smiley's 177,228 votes to claim his fourth six-year term representing the Fifth District on the Louisiana Public Service Commission in the November 3, 2020 election.

== 2007 gubernatorial campaign ==
In November 2006, Campbell informed the press that he was considering challenging incumbent Governor Kathleen Blanco, a fellow Democrat, in the 2007 primary election. He subsequently toured the state, raised money, and hired political consultant George Kennedy, who has been described by LAPolitics.com as "the state's hottest political consultant." The centerpiece of Campbell's platform was a proposal to repeal the excise tax levied by the state on domestic oil production and replace it with a 6 percent processing fee on all oil and natural gas that passes through the state. Campbell estimated that this fee would raise $5.5 billion per year, enough to eliminate the state's income tax with nearly $2 billion per year left for discretionary spending.

On March 19, 2007, in a press conference held in New Orleans, Campbell officially announced his gubernatorial candidacy. The next day, in apparent response to opinion polls showing that she would be unlikely to win re-election over Jindal, whom she had defeated in 2003, Blanco announced that she would not seek a second term as governor. Former U.S. Senator John Breaux, a Democrat, was expected to announce his candidacy, but he bowed out on April 13. On April 26, another gubernatorial contender, Walter Boasso, the Republican state senator from St. Bernard Parish in south Louisiana, announced that he was returning to the Democratic Party. Campbell faced Jindal and Boasso in the nonpartisan blanket primary as well as a liberal independent, John Georges of New Orleans. When asked to cite some of the differences between him and front-runner Jindal, Campbell says, "I understand rural people and agriculture. He has no idea what's going on in rural communities and agriculture. I work with black people very well. I don’t think that he has a lot of communication with the black community."

In the gubernatorial race, Campbell polled 161,425 votes (12 percent) and won two parishes: Red River and Bienville, both near Shreveport. He lost his home parish of Bossier Parish (20 percent) to the successful Republican candidate, Bobby Jindal (60 percent).

Had he been elected governor, Campbell would have been the fifth public service commissioner to move into the state's top position. Previously, Huey P. Long Jr., Jimmie Davis, John McKeithen, and Blanco were public service commissioners.

== 2016 U.S. Senate campaign ==
Campbell was a Democratic candidate for the United States Senate vacated in January 2017 by David Vitter. The primary election coincided with the presidential general election. Campbell's opponents included Republican U.S. Representatives John Fleming of Campbell's own Louisiana's 4th congressional district and Charles Boustany of Louisiana's 3rd congressional district, State Treasurer John Neely Kennedy, former U.S. Representative Joseph Cao of Louisiana's 1st congressional district, and Colonel Rob Maness of Madisonville, a leader in the Tea Party movement. Another Democrat, Caroline Fayard of New Orleans, also ran for the Senate seat, but Campbell carried the endorsement of Governor John Bel Edwards, for whom he has been an advisor and for whom Campbell campaigned in the 2015 election against Senator Vitter, who subsequently announced his retirement from politics after his loss in the governor's race.

The race received national attention: Campbell was invited for interviews on MSNBC and CNN. Campbell faced Treasurer John Kennedy in the December 10 runoff contest; Kennedy, boosted by campaign appearances from U.S. President-elect Donald Trump and Vice President-elect Mike Pence, won the runoff contest by twenty-one points.

Party political offices
Preceded by Charlie Melancon	Democratic nominee for U.S. Senator from Louisiana (Class 3); 2016	Most recent
