= The Advocate (Louisiana) =

Newspaper in Louisiana, United States

- The April 4, 2007, front page of The Advocate
- Type: Daily newspaper
- Format: Broadsheet
- Owner: Georges Media
- Publisher: Judi Terzotis
- Editor: Rene Sanchez
- Founded: 1925 (with heritage dating to 1842)
- Headquarters: 10705 Rieger Road; Baton Rouge, Louisiana
- Circulation: 36,685 Daily; 42,064 Sunday
- Website: theadvocate.com

The Advocate is Louisiana's largest daily newspaper. Based in Baton Rouge, it serves the southern portion of the state. Separate editions for New Orleans, The Times-Picayune | The New Orleans Advocate, for Shreveport and Bossier City, The Shreveport-Bossier City Advocate, and for Acadiana, The Acadiana Advocate, are published. It also publishes gambit, about New Orleans food, culture, events, and news, and weekly entertainment magazines: Red in Baton Rouge and Lafayette, and Beaucoup in New Orleans.

== History ==
The oldest ancestor of the modern paper was the Democratic Advocate, an anti-Whig, pro-Democrat periodical established in 1842.

Another newspaper, the Louisiana Capitolian, was established in 1868 and soon merged with the then-named Weekly Advocate. By 1889 the paper was being published daily. In 1904, a new owner, William Hamilton, renamed it The Baton Rouge Times and later The State-Times, a paper with emphasis on local news.

In 1909, The State-Times was acquired by Capital City Press, a company newly founded by Charles P. Manship Sr. and James Edmonds. Manship purchased his partner's interest in 1912. In 1925, he also began publishing The Morning Advocate to focus on national news. The Manship family went on to become an influential force in Baton Rouge, later adding radio station WJBO in 1932 (moving it to Baton Rouge in 1934) and television station WBRZ-TV in 1955.

The State-Times, an afternoon publication, ceased in October 1991. The Advocate remains the sole descendant of the original 1842 paper. The Manship family's Capital City Press company continued to own and operate The Advocate until 2013.

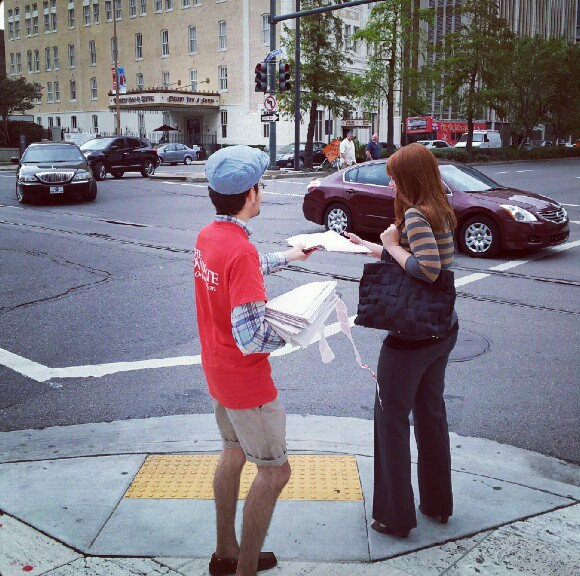
Handing out free copies of the New Orleans edition in the New Orleans Central Business District, October 2012

On October 1, 2012, under the Manships, The Advocate began printing and distributing a daily New Orleans edition. This was due to a perceived gap in the market that materialized when New Orleans' longtime daily paper, The Times-Picayune, announced it would cut back its print publication to only three days a week.

In March 2013, New Orleans businessman John Georges signed a letter of intent to purchase The Advocate. Georges and his wife Dathel bought the newspaper through a holding company, Georges Media, on April 30, 2013. The newspaper's circulation in 2013 was 98,000 (daily) and 125,000 (Sunday) as a result of its entry into and 20,000 subscriptions in the New Orleans market.

The Advocate relaunched its New Orleans edition August 18, 2013, as The New Orleans Advocate and later added The Acadiana Advocate, a third edition serving Lafayette and the Acadiana region.

On April 9, 2018, the holding company for The New Orleans Advocate purchased the New Orleans weekly Gambit and bestofneworleans.com.

In 2019, The Advocate won its first Pulitzer Prize, in the Local Reporting category, "For a damning portrayal of the state's discriminatory conviction system, including a Jim Crow-era law, that enabled Louisiana courts to send defendants to jail without jury consensus on the accused's guilt." The Advocate's reporting highlighted how the state's non-unanimous jury law—one of only two in the country, with the other being in Oregon—contributed to racial disparities in incarceration and sentencing. Due in part to a voter-education campaign based on The Advocate's reporting, Louisiana voters approved an amendment to the state constitution requiring unanimous jury verdicts on November 6, 2018.

In May 2019, The Advocate announced that the Georges had purchased its New Orleans competitor, The Times-Picayune, and planned to merge the two papers and their websites into a new newspaper in June 2019. Like The Advocate, the combined newspaper will publish a print edition seven days a week. The Advocate's Baton Rouge and Lafayette editions were unaffected. The merged paper, carrying the nameplates of both The Times-Picayune and The New Orleans Advocate, began publication on July 1.

== Notable people ==
- David William Thomas

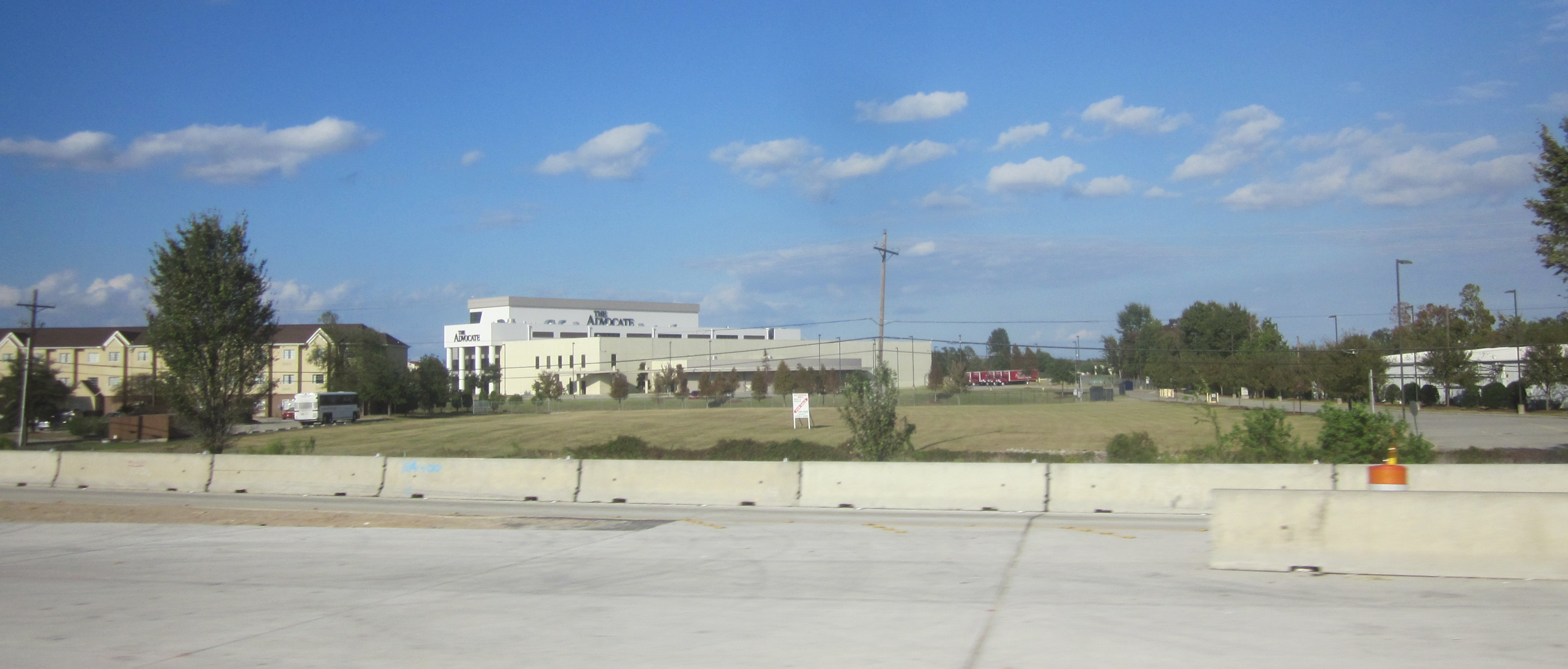
Advocate main office in Baton Rouge, 2012

- In 2007, the newspaper lost three of its key staff with the deaths of Capitol Bureau Chief John LaPlante, health reporter and author of "The Patient Person" columns Laurie Smith Anderson and environmental writer Michael P. Dunne. LaPlante died in Texas in a drowning accident, and Anderson and Dunne succumbed to cancer.
- In 2013, two-time Pulitzer Prize winner Walt Handelsman returned to Louisiana to join The Advocate as a cartoonist and animator, and columnist James Gill moved to The Advocate from the Times-Picayune.
