= Louisiana Public Service Commission =

Independent regulatory agency of Louisiana

- Seal of Louisiana

Agency overview
- Formed: June 18, 1921
- Preceding agency: Railroad Commission of Louisiana
- Type: Independent regulatory agency
- Jurisdiction: Louisiana
- Headquarters: Galvez Building; Baton Rouge, Louisiana
- Annual budget: $10,242,843 (FY 2021)
- Agency executives: Mike Francis, Chairman; Craig Greene, Vice Chairman
- Key document: Article IV, Section 21 of the Louisiana Constitution
- Website: www.lpsc.louisiana.gov

The Louisiana Public Service Commission (LPSC) is an independent regulatory agency which manages public utilities and motor carriers in Louisiana. The commission is established by Article IV, Section 21 of the 1921 Constitution of the State of Louisiana. It succeeded the Railroad Commission of Louisiana that was created by the 1898 Constitution. The commission has five elected members chosen in single-member districts for staggered six-year terms. Thus the commissioners have large constituencies (bigger, e.g., than Congressional districts), long terms (6 years), and close involvement with issues of intense consumer interest (such as electricity bills); consequently membership in LPSC has been known to serve as a springboard to even higher public office, as in the cases of Huey Long, Jimmie Davis, John McKeithen, and Kathleen Babineaux Blanco — LPSC members who became governors of Louisiana.

== Jurisdiction ==
The LPSC is frequently in the news in Louisiana, largely because of its regulatory authority over investor-owned public utilities which offer electric, water, wastewater, natural gas, as well as telecommunication services. It also regulates electric member-owned cooperatives, including those whose members have voted to vest the commission with particular powers. The commission's authority does not extend within the city limits of New Orleans for electric retail services as that power is held by the city council. The LPSC also is not vested with some of its regulatory authority for those electric utilities which are municipally owned and have greater than 50 MW of load; those powers are held by the city councils for those governments, including the city of Lafayette, Louisiana. It regulates intrastate transportation, including passenger carrier services, waste haulers, household goods carriers, non-consensual towing, and intrastate pipelines. These issues are inseparable from often strongly held opinions by consumers and the regulated industries. One of LPSC'S most-popular actions was its implementation, on January 1, 2002, of the "Do Not Call" program, which prohibits telemarketers from telephoning people who request that they not receive such calls. The power of the LPSC was reduced by the Supreme Court in favor of the Federal Energy Regulatory Commission for determining electric generation costs in Entergy Louisiana, Inc. v. Louisiana Public Service Commission.

== History ==
The commission was first established as the Railroad, Express, Telephone, Telegraph, Steamboat and Other Water Craft, and Sleeping Car Commission in the 1898 Constitution. As originally established, the Commission consisted of three members elected to staggered, six-year terms, each from a separate district. The districts, which were originally based in metropolitan New Orleans, southern Louisiana, and northern Louisiana, were not redrawn until 1972. Then, when the 1974 Constitution was adopted, the commission was expanded to five members, and districts were redrawn every decade to correspond with the federal census. The commission was renamed the Public Service Commission by the state's 1921 Constitution.

Members of Commission have frequently sought higher office, and often successfully. Four former members have been elected Governor: Huey Long in 1928, Jimmie Davis in 1944 and 1960, John McKeithen in 1964 and 1968, and Kathleen Blanco in 2003. In recent years, several Public Service Commissioners have unsuccessfully run for higher office: Foster Campbell ran for Governor in 2007 and the U.S. Senate in 2016, and Scott Angelle ran for Governor in 2015 and for Congress in 2016.

Democrats held a majority on the commission from the first elections in 1898 through 2008. In 2008, Democratic Commissioner Dale Sittig resigned to accept an appointment by Governor Bobby Jindal to serve as the executive director of the Louisiana Offshore Terminal Authority. Jindal appointed Pat Manuel to serve until a 2009 special election, which was won by former Republican Congressman Clyde C. Holloway, winning a Republican majority on the commission for the first time in its history.

== Commissioners ==
District	Name	Party	Start	Next Election
1	Eric Skrmetta	Republican	January 1, 2009	2026 (term limited)
2	Jean-Paul Coussan	Republican	January 1, 2025	2030
3	Davante Lewis	Democratic	December 31, 2022	2028
4	Mike Francis	Republican	January 3, 2017	2028
5	Foster L. Campbell	Democratic	January 1, 2003	2026 (term limited)

== Controversy ==
The Louisiana Public Service Commission has enabled and enforced a limited cap on net metering, preventing many homeowners from across the state from installing solar panels on their homes. The cap, which is lower than almost any other state in the country, has faced criticism from homeowners who want the ability to go solar to save money on their electric bills.

Some utilities in Louisiana have already begun to hit their cap, and new homeowners in those areas cannot install solar systems. If the Public Service Commission does not increase the cap, some solar companies may be forced to close or to leave the state.

On March 28, 2016, the commission in a 4–1 vote approved the sale of Cleco, an energy company based in Pineville, to a group of foreign investors: Macquarie Infrastructure and Real Assets, British Columbia Investment Management Corporation, John Hancock Financial, and other infrastructure investors. Earlier, the commission had disapproved the sale despite support from business leaders and Cleco investors. In his opposition, Commissioner Clyde Holloway expressed fear for "the long term consequences of Cleco's captive ratepayers. Cleco as we know it has ceased to exist. It is now owned by a private foreign investment company that plans to flip it in eight to ten years. And that same private foreign investment company is financing the deal with a massive amount of debt. ..."
