= List of Florida Institute of Technology people =

This list contains people associated with the Florida Institute of Technology in Melbourne, Florida, including current and former college presidents, as well as notable alumni and faculty.

== Academia and research ==
=== Professors and scholars ===
Name	Class year	Notability	Reference
Apryl A. Alexander	2009	Forensic psychologist and clinical psychologist; professor at the University of Denver	
José E. Andrade	2001	Civil engineer; recipient of Thomas J.R. Hughes Young Investigator Award (2017) and Walter L. Huber Civil Engineering Research Prize (2018); professor at California Institute of Technology	
Randy Borum	1991	Forensic psychologist; intelligence, national security, & cyber defense; served on Defense Science Board; professor at University of South Florida	
Mya Breitbart		Oceanographer and marine biologist; professor at University of South Florida	
Kent E. Carpenter	1975	Marine biologist; professor at Old Dominion University	
Kevin C. Dittman		Computer scientist; professor at Purdue University	
Wassim Michael Haddad	1987	IEEE Fellow specialist in thermodynamics, stability theory, robust control, and dynamical system theory; professor at Georgia Institute of Technology	
Edward E. Thomas Jr.	1989	Plasma physicist; professor at Auburn University	

=== Research, science, technology, and math ===
Name	Class year	Notability	Reference
Mary Lou Zoback		Researcher, geophysicist and seismologist	

== Astronauts ==
Name	Class year	Notability	Reference
Joan Higginbotham	1992	Engineer, NASA astronaut, M.S. Management Science, 1992, M.S. Space Systems, 1996	
Kathryn P. Hire	1991	NASA astronaut (STS-90), M.S. Space Technology	
Christopher Loria		NASA astronaut, M.S. degree in aeronautical engineering	
Frederick W. Sturckow	2000	NASA astronaut, M.S. Mechanical Engineering, veteran of four Space Shuttle missions	
Sunita Williams	1995	NASA astronaut, M.S. Engineering Management	
George D. Zamka	1997	NASA astronaut (STS-120), M.S. Engineering Management	

== Business and entrepreneurship ==
=== Computers and Internet ===
Name	Class year	Notability	Reference
Richard Adams		Inventor and founder of Happy Computers	
Fahri Diner	1989	Founder of Plume and Qtera, which was bought out by Nortel for $3.2 billion	
Herbert Hugh Thompson	2002	Chairman of RSA Conference and former chief technology officer of NortonLifeLock	

=== Executives and finance ===
Name	Class year	Notability	Reference
Gordon Derrick		Former director of Antigua Commercial Bank	
Ryan Gellert	1996	CEO of Patagonia, Inc. and former president of Black Diamond Equipment	
Svafa Grönfeldt	1995	Former deputy CEO at Actavis, executive vice president at Alvogen, and former president of Reykjavík University	
David P. Norton		Co-founder of Palladium International; known for working with Robert S. Kaplan to co-create the balanced scorecard approach	
Salli Setta	1992	Former president of Red Lobster and executive vice president of Olive Garden under Darden Restaurants	
Dia Simms	1992	CEO of Lobos 1707 Tequila & Mezcal and former president of Sean Combs's Combs Enterprises	
Jim Thomas		Former president of Sierra and Executive Vice President/CFO positions at MicroProse, Rivian Automotive, and MapQuest; managed the initial public offering of MapQuest	
Ronnie Wong	2007	Founder of Chung Wah Shipbuilding & Engineering Company and former chairman of Po Leung Kuk	

=== Miscellaneous ===
Name	Class year	Notability	Reference
Chaz Stevens	1982	Founder of ESADoggy	

== Government, law, and public policy ==
=== Diplomats ===
Name	Class year	Notability	Reference
Jeanine E. Jackson	1971	16th U.S. ambassador to Burkina Faso (2006–2009); 17th U.S. ambassador to Malawi (2011–2014)	

=== International ===
Name	Class year	Notability	Reference
Gerald Berkel		Island governor of Sint Eustatius 2010–2016	
Saud bin Hilal Al Busaidi	2000	Governor of Muscat, Oman	
Kao Kuang-chi		31st Minister of National Defense of the Republic of China, and retired admiral of the Republic of China Navy	
Prince Louis of Luxembourg		Third son of Grand Duke Henri (monarch of Luxembourg, 2000–present); studied aeronautics and aeronautical management for two years (c.2009–2011) at FIT	
Waleed A. Samkari	1988	Brigadier general; former director of the Jordanian Maintenance Corps	

=== Judges ===
Name	Class year	Notability	Reference
John Antoon	1993	United States federal judge	
Catharina Haynes	1983	United States federal judge	

=== Law, politics, and public policy ===
Name	Class year	Notability	Reference
Peter Durant		Member of the Massachusetts Senate since 2023 and former member of Massachusetts House of Representatives 6th district (2011–2013)	
Craig Fugate		Former administrator of Federal Emergency Management Agency	
Dana Gartzke		Assistant secretary of Commerce for Economic Development under 45th President of the United States Donald Trump	
Jeffrey D. Grant	1975	Former director, Office of Plans and Analysis in National Reconnaissance Office; served as programs director at CIA Directorate of Intelligence, Office of Scientific Intelligence and the Directorate of Science and Technology	
Jacey Jetton		Member of the Texas House of Representatives since 2021	
Kathy McGuiness		Auditor of Delaware, 2019–2022	
Steven McLaughlin		County executive of Rensselaer County, NY and member of New York State Assembly 107th district (2011–2017)	
Tom Reeder		Member of Wyoming House of Representatives representing 58th district, 2011–2017	
David Smith		Member of the Florida House of Representatives representing the state's 38th House district since 2018	
Stephen R. Speed	1993	Mayor of Dover, Delaware, 2004–2007	
Tom Stuart		Mayor of Meridian, Mississippi, 1973–1977	

=== Military ===
Name	Class year	Notability	Reference
James W. Ball		Major general USA, Ret.; served as the 24th Chief of Ordnance	
Charles C. Cannon Jr.	1976	Major general USA, Ret.	
David T. Cloft	2007	Lieutenant colonel USA, Ret.; formerly served as executive officer (XO) for U.S. Army Accessions Command; competitive shooter for US National Rifle Team; seven-time national champion and has set 11 US national records	
Jesse Cross	1991	Brigadier general USA, Ret.; 50th quartermaster general of the United States Army	
Jeffrey W. Drushal	?	Brigadier general USA; chief of Transportation Corps	
Ann E. Dunwoody	1987	General USA, M.S., first female four-star general in the military	
James L. Herdt	1992	9th master chief petty officer of the Navy, USN	
Larry L. Hereth	1992	Rear admiral USCG, commander of the Fifth Coast Guard District of the United States Coast Guard	
Galen B. Jackman	1983	Major general USA, Ret.; chief of Legislative Liaison, U.S. Army	
Dennis K. Jackson		Major general USA, Ret.; served as the 30th chief of Ordnance and director of logistics (J4) United States Central Command	
Herbert J. McChrystal		Major general USA, former commander of United States Army Test and Evaluation Command	
Al M. Niles, Jr	2010	Colonel USA, decorated special operations aviator and former wing commander during Operation Iraqi Freedom in 2005 for Task Force Warfighter	
Gustave F. Perna		General USA, 19th commander of United States Army Materiel Command	
Aundre F. Piggee		Lieutenant general USA, United States Army Logistics Branch deputy chief	
David A. Score	1989	Rear admiral, 17th director of the NOAA Commissioned Officer Corps	
Steven A. Shapiro	1994	Major general USA, Ret.; served as 9th commanding general of United States Army Sustainment Command	
Billy K. Solomon		Lieutenant general USA, served as 6th commander of United States Army Combined Arms Support Command	
Mitchell H. Stevenson		Lieutenant general USA, served as the 31st chief of ordnance	
Peter Talleri	1997	Major general USMC, former commander of Marine Corps Installations Pacific	
Thomas H. Todd III	1997	Lieutenant general USA; deputy commanding general of United States Army Combat Capabilities Development Command	
Jonathan White	1981	Rear admiral USN; commander of Naval Meteorology and Oceanography Command	
Johnnie E. Wilson	1977	General USA, Ret.; served as the 25th chief of Ordnance	
Cedric T. Wins		Major general USA, Ret.; first commander of reorganized United States Army Combat Capabilities Development Command (DEVCOM)	
Larry D. Wyche		Lieutenant general USA, served as the commanding general of the U.S. Army Combined Arms Support Command	
David T. Zabecki	1976	Major general USA, Ret.; former deputy chief of the United States Army Reserve	

== Humanities, arts, entertainment, and social sciences ==
=== Actors ===
Name	Class year	Notability	Reference
Richard Hatch		Original winner of the CBS Survivor television series	
Don "The Dragon" Wilson		Actor and martial artist inducted into the International Sports Hall of Fame	

=== Writers ===
Name	Class year	Notability	Reference
Lela E. Buis	1991	Author, poet and playwright	
Joni E. Johnston	1985	Author and forensic psychologist	
Jazmin Truesdale		Writer and creator of AZA Comics	

== Science, technology, medicine and engineering ==
=== Science and engineering ===
Name	Class year	Notability	Reference
Addison Bain		NASA scientist credited with postulating the incendiary paint theory	
Alyssa Carson	2023	Social media influencer and space enthusiast	
David A. King	1991	Director, NASA Marshall Space Flight Center	
Ramon Lugo III	1982	Director of Florida Space Institute and former NASA director of the Glenn Research Center	
Julius Montgomery	1964	First Black professional in the U.S. Space Program	
Mike Moses	1989	President of Virgin Galactic; former NASA Space Shuttle program launch integration manager from 2008 until the conclusion of the program in 2011	
Amy Simon	1993	NASA senior scientist at Goddard Space Flight Center, involved in several missions of the Solar System Exploration Program	
Felix Soto Toro	1990	NASA engineer, developed the advanced payload transfer measurement system for NASA	
Sara Imari Walker	2005	Theoretical physicist and astrobiologist scientist at NASA Astrobiology Institute	

=== Technology ===
Name	Class year	Notability	Reference
Frank J. Canova	1978	Inventor of the smartphone and IBM Simon	
John Cosker	1991	Designer, builder of high end fast powerboats	

== Sports ==
Name	Class year	Notability	Reference
Austin Allen		Professional baseball player for New York Mets	
Thomas Bohrer		Olympic rower medalist	
Keiran Breslin	1994	Professional soccer player	
Mark Cartwright		Former professional soccer player and manager of Stoke City F.C.	
Robin Chan	1990	Former professional soccer player	
Dean Faithfull	2011	Professional gridiron football player for Edmonton Elks	
Steve Freeman	1989	Professional soccer player	
Aubin-Thierry Goporo	1996	Former Olympic basketball player with Central African Republic and current director of Student-Athlete Development, Tennessee Volunteers basketball	
J.T. Hassell	2019	Former professional football player for National Football League (NFL)	
Rocío Hernández	2006	Professional soccer player and former captain of the Puerto Rico women's national team Olympic team	
Jan Hlavica	2017	Former professional soccer player	
Daniela Iacobelli		Professional golfer	
Ubaldo Jimenez	2021	Professional baseball player	
Khalid Outaleb	1986	Former professional tennis player	
Ricahard Sharpe	1993	Former professional soccer player	
Paul Sturgess		Professional basketball player	
Francisco Ubiera	2013	Professional soccer player representing Dominican Republic national team	
Valur Orri Valsson	2020	Professional basketball player	
Tim Wakefield		Professional baseball player	
Dwight Walton		Professional basketball player	
Narupon Wild	2011	Professional soccer player	
Tom Windle		Professional soccer player	
Jiya Wright		Professional football player, Sioux Falls Storm	

== Staff and faculty ==
=== Florida Institute of Technology presidents ===
Name	Notability	Reference
Anthony Catanese	President of FIT 2002–2016	
Winston E. Scott	Vice president of FIT, former NASA astronaut	

=== Staff and faculty ===
Name	Notability	Reference
Buzz Aldrin	Astronaut second man on the moon; senior advisor and professor of studies on space exploration at FIT, namesake of Florida Tech's Space Institute	
Samuel Durrance	Former NASA Space Shuttle payload specialist; university professor of physics and space sciences	
Larry L. Hench	University Professor of Biomedical Engineering	
Mary Helen Johnston (McCay)	Engineer; former NASA astronaut	
Cem Kaner	University professor and director of Center for Software Testing Education & Research	
Joan C. Sherman	Chemist	
