= John Fleming (Louisiana politician) =

American politician (born 1951)

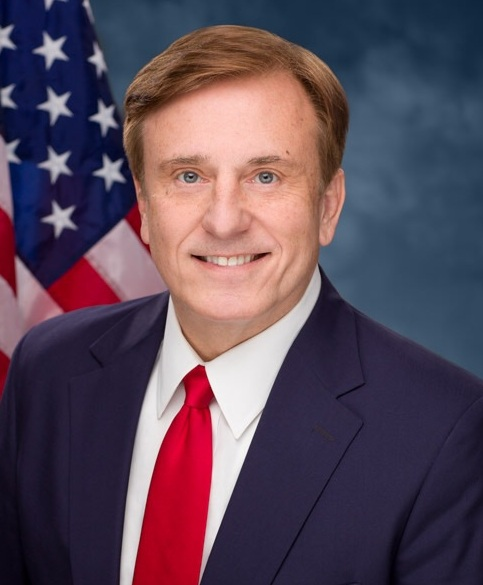
- Official portrait, 2019

Treasurer of Louisiana
- Incumbent
- Assumed office January 8, 2024
- Governor: Jeff Landry
- Preceded by: John Schroder

White House Deputy Chief of Staff for Planning and Implementation
- In office March 23, 2020 – January 20, 2021
- President: Donald Trump
- Preceded by: Emma Doyle (Principal Deputy)
- Succeeded by: Jen O'Malley Dillon (Operations)

Assistant Secretary of Commerce for Economic Development
- In office March 15, 2019 – March 23, 2020
- President: Donald Trump
- Preceded by: Jay Williams
- Succeeded by: Alejandra Castillo

Member of the U.S. House of Representatives from Louisiana's 4th district
- In office January 3, 2009 – January 3, 2017
- Preceded by: Jim McCrery
- Succeeded by: Mike Johnson

Personal details
- Born: John Calvin Fleming Jr. July 5, 1951 (age 75) Meridian, Mississippi, U.S.
- Party: Republican
- Spouse: Cynthia Bishop (m. 1978)
- Children: 4
- Education: University of Mississippi (BS, MD)

Military service
- Branch/service: United States Navy
- Years of service: 1976–1982
- Rank: Lieutenant Commander

John Calvin Fleming Jr. (born July 5, 1951) is an American politician, physician, and former naval officer serving as the treasurer of Louisiana since 2024. A member of the Republican Party, he previously held positions in the executive branch during the first presidency of Donald Trump and represented Louisiana's 4th congressional district in the United States House of Representatives from 2009 to 2017.

After working as a family doctor and businessman, Fleming was elected to the U.S. House of Representatives in 2008. He was a candidate in the 2016 United States Senate election in Louisiana and finished fifth in the nonpartisan primary.

After leaving the United States Congress, Fleming was first appointed by Donald Trump as the deputy assistant secretary for health information technology reform, then as the assistant secretary of commerce for economic development. He was later made a White House aide, serving as White House deputy chief of staff and assistant to the President for planning and implementation.

Fleming won the 2023 Louisiana treasurer election in the November runoff, receiving over 65% of the vote. In December 2024, he announced his candidacy for the United States Senate in 2026. Both Fleming and Julia Letlow defeated incumbent senator Bill Cassidy in the primary but neither received a majority of the primary vote, thus triggering a runoff. The runoff was held on June 27, in which Fleming lost to Letlow.

== Early life and education ==
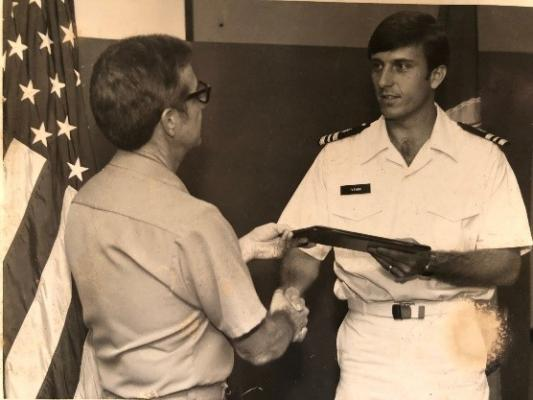
Fleming receiving an award while serving in the Navy.

John Calvin Fleming Jr. was born in Meridian, Mississippi, on July 5, 1951, as the son of John Calvin and Ruth (née Giles) Fleming. His mother became disabled when he was five years old and his father died of a heart attack a few weeks before Fleming graduated from Meridian High School in 1969. He played as a defensive end on his high school football team. Fleming attended the University of Mississippi at Oxford, where he was a member of the Phi Delta Theta fraternity. Fleming funded his education with odd jobs, including working as a sorority houseboy, as an orderly in a state mental hospital, as a bag boy, and with financial assistance. He graduated with a Bachelor of Science in 1973. He later attended medical school at the Jackson campus of the same university, earning an Doctor of Medicine in 1976.

Fleming trained for years in karate and attained the rank of third-degree black belt. He took his first piano lesson at age 43 and ultimately studied for 14 years afterwards, playing the occasional recital and concert.

== Medical and naval career ==
Fleming joined the United States Navy in 1976. Fleming was the chief resident during the final year of his three-year residency in family medicine at the Naval Regional Medical Center in Camp Pendleton, California. He also trained at the drug and alcohol treatment unit at the Naval Regional Medical Center in Long Beach, California. Completing his residency in family medicine with the Navy in 1979, Fleming was Guam's chief director of drug and alcohol treatment and chairman of the Navy's Family Advocacy Committee for Guam from 1979 to 1981. He subsequently performed similar duties in Charleston, South Carolina. He left the Navy in 1982, when he moved to Minden, Louisiana, and established his private family medicine practice. He has served as a deacon, Sunday school teacher, and Sunday school department director at the First Baptist Church of Minden.

After leaving the Navy, Fleming established a practice in Minden in August 1982. His first clinic was on Pearl Street across from the United States Post Office. He chose Minden for his city of residence because, in his words, it "has small-town charm, warm essence of life, long, lazy summer days with watermelon cuts and family reunions." To attract patients to his new practice, Fleming announced evening and Saturday morning hours to accommodate working people and students.

Fleming is board certified by the American Board of Family Medicine He joined the staff of the Minden Medical Center. Fleming is also a member of the American Academy of Family Physicians (AAFP) and the Louisiana Academy of Family Physicians (LAFP). In 2007, he was chosen as the LAFP "Louisiana Family Practice Physician of the Year."

Fleming previously worked with drug-dependent persons through the program called "New Beginnings" at the Minden Medical Center. In 1994, Fleming noted to local media the tie between drug addiction and violent crime

In 2006, Fleming wrote Preventing Addiction: What Parents Must Know to Immunize Their Kids Against Drug And Alcohol Addiction. In the book, Fleming argues that alcohol, among other addicting substances, can serve as a gateway for broader and more problematic drug use, and that the immature brain development of children makes them vulnerable to drug addiction later in life. Therefore, delaying the use of alcohol and other addicting substances until later adolescence or adulthood can sharply reduce the risk of later addiction according to scientific studies initiated by the National Institute on Drug Abuse and others.

It was reported that Fleming would have to sell his private practice in 2017.

== Business career ==
Fleming started various businesses before entering politics. In 2008, when he first ran for Congress, he owned 30 franchised Subway sandwich shops in Shreveport and north Louisiana, and also owned Fleming Expansions, LLC, a regional developer for The UPS Store. As of 2016, he was the owner of 38 Subway sandwich shops and was the developer of 168 UPS Stores.

== Webster Parish coroner ==
In 1995, Fleming ran for election to be the Webster Parish coroner, defeating the nonpartisan candidate Carlos A. Irizarry, 7,842 votes (60.4 percent) to 5,143 (39.6 percent). Fleming succeeded the incumbent, Carl A. Hines, a Democrat from Minden, who did not seek re-election. Fleming was the coroner of Webster Parish from 1996 to 2000.

== U.S. House of Representatives ==
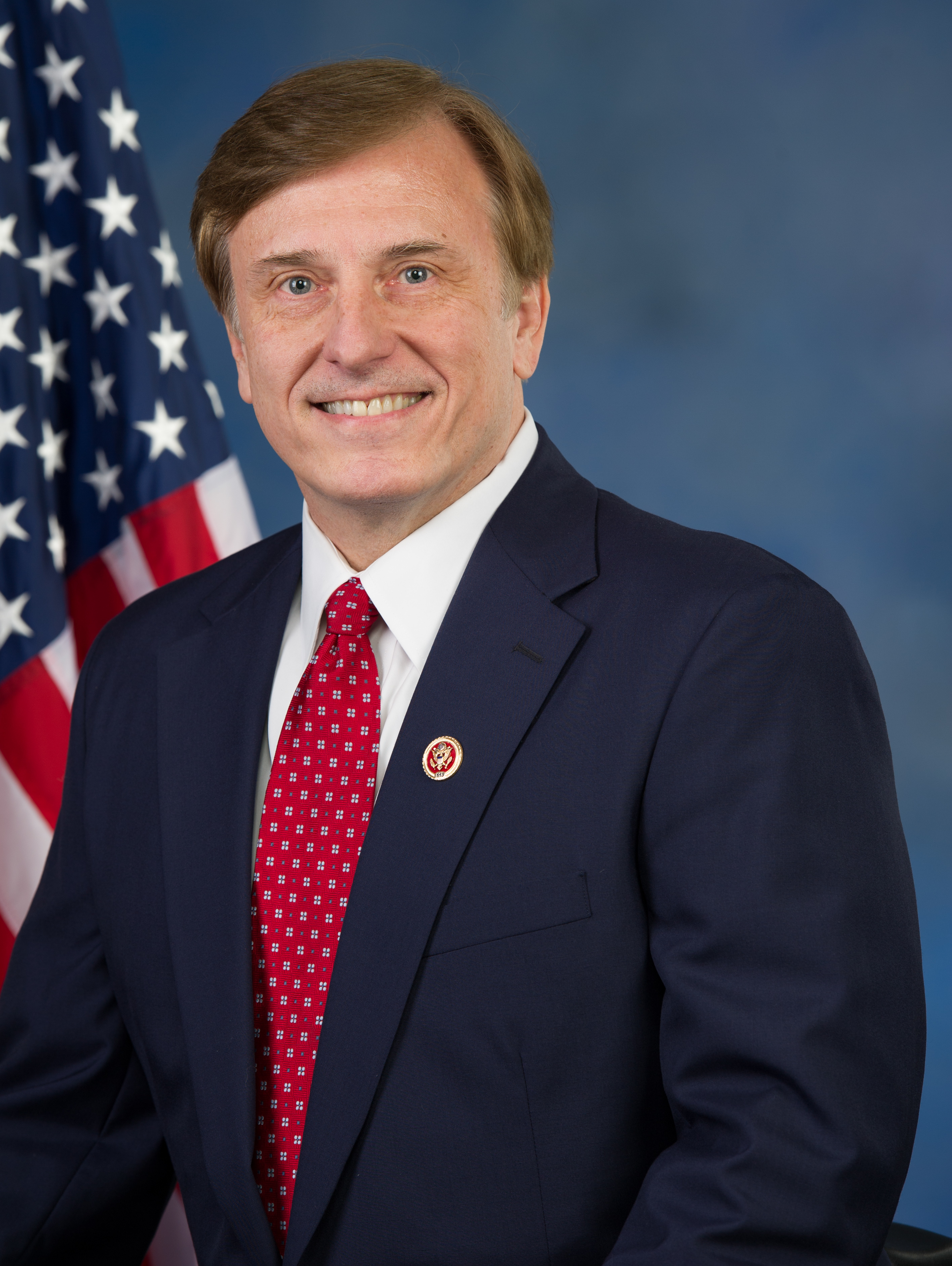
Fleming during the 113th Congress

=== Elections ===
==== 2008 ====
Fleming entered the race as a candidate for Louisiana's 4th congressional district after the 21-year Republican incumbent Jim McCrery announced his retirement from the House. He received political support from the Louisiana Academy of Family Physicians (LAFP) and the American Academy of Family Physicians' (AAFP) political action committee for his campaign. Fleming supported the FairTax proposal. In the October 4, 2008, Republican closed primary, Fleming ran against Jeff R. Thompson, a lawyer from Bossier City, and Chris Gorman. In the election, no candidate received a majority of the votes. Fleming led with 14,500 votes (35.1 percent), followed by Gorman with 14,072 votes (34.1 percent), and Thompson with 12,693 votes (30.8 percent). This established a primary runoff between Fleming and Gorman. In the runoff, Fleming defeated Gorman, 43,012 votes (55.6 percent) to 34,405 (44.4 percent) and carried all but one of the thirteen parishes in the district.

Dick Cheney, the outgoing Vice President of the United States appeared in Shreveport on November 21, 2008, to speak at a fundraiser for Fleming. Politico indicated that McCrery supported Fleming but had not made an official endorsement and had not appeared at any of Fleming's campaign events. On December 10, 2008, Paul Carmouche formally conceded the election to Fleming.

==== 2010 ====
Fleming was unopposed in the Republican primary in 2010 but was challenged by the Democratic nominee, David R. Melville. Melville was the brother-in-law of Buddy Roemer. Fleming was reelected saying that Democratic policies were out of step with his district and most of America. In 2010, the House Republican Conference created the "New Media Challenge" to spur Republican members to acquire more followers. Fleming was awarded first place in both 2010 and 2011 by his Republican peers.

==== 2012 ====
Fleming was unopposed by a Democratic candidate in his 2012 re-election bid in his district that is two to one Democratic registration but had a Cook Partisan Voting Index of R +11. In the November 6, 2012, general election, Fleming instead faced opposition from a Libertarian candidate, Randall Lord of Shreveport, a former chiropractor studying psychology at Louisiana State University in Shreveport. Fleming defeated Lord, 187,790 (75.3 percent) to 61,587 (24.7 percent). Lord was subsequently sentenced to 46 months in federal prison for running an illegal bitcoin scheme alongside his son Michael Lord after they had both plead guilty to operating an unlicensed money servicing business that was not registered with the Financial Crimes Enforcement Network.

==== 2014 ====
John Fleming considered running in the 2014 United States Senate election in Louisiana held by Mary Landrieu. Instead his colleague, U.S. representative Bill Cassidy, had announced on April 3, 2013, that he would challenge Landrieu. That same day, Fleming announced that he would not run for the United States Senate in 2014. In his statement, Fleming said: "For me to enter the race now would risk a contest between two experienced Republican congressmen, potentially offering Senator Landrieu a path back to Washington D.C. I can't let that happen."

Fleming again faced Randall Lord, a Libertarian, in the 2014 election. Justin Ansley, a Democrat, had ran but withdrew from the race. Fleming won with 73.4% of the vote to Lord's 26.6% of the vote.

=== Congressional tenure ===
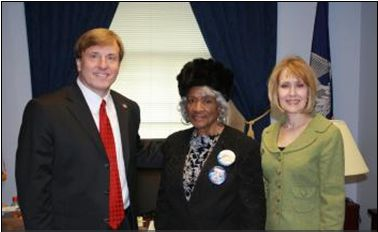
Mamie Love Wallace seen on the day of the first inauguration of Barack Obama bracketed by John and Cindy Fleming on 20 January 2009

Fleming served four two-year terms in the U.S. House of Representatives from January 3, 2009, to January 3, 2017.

==== Budget Control Act of 2011 and Budget Sequestration of 2013 ====
Fleming was quoted in Forbes as saying: "Republicans in general, we desperately want a reduction in spending to get government back into balance. We would rather take some cuts in areas that we are not comfortable with than have no cuts at all." Forbes noted that Fleming's district includes Barksdale Air Force Base and Fort Polk, both major military installations. At a discussion in February 2013 in DeRidder; Fleming, a military veteran, stated he would not vote to allow the government to cut $600 million from the defense budget. He was quoted as saying, "One way my service in the military changes the way I do my job is that I understand our next conflict is not a matter of 'if' but 'when,' and that we need to equip our military with the resources and tools they need to protect our nation at home and abroad." Fleming voted against the Budget Control Act of 2011. On November 21, 2011, Fleming criticized the Budget Control Act because of what he called "devastating cuts to military spending."

==== American Health Care Reform Act of 2013 ====
Fleming was a vocal critic of the Affordable Care Act (ACA), which was signed into law in 2010 and was the subject of more than 50 repeal attempts by the Republican-controlled House. Fleming referred to the ACA as "the most dangerous piece of legislation ever passed by Congress." When asked about fixing the healthcare law instead of repealing it, he said it was "not fixable or repairable." Fleming helped write, cosponsored, and introduced the Republican Study Committee's American Health Care Reform Act of 2013, which was re-introduced in 2015. The legislation would have repealed the ACA and the health care provisions of the Health Care and Education Reconciliation Act of 2010 and implemented different health care related provisions.

==== Conscience Protection Act of 2016 ====
On March 22, 2016, Fleming introduced the Conscience Protection Act of 2016 which "amends the Public Health Service Act to codify the prohibition against the federal government and state and local governments that receive federal financial assistance for health-related activities penalizing or discriminating against a health care provider based on the provider's refusal to be involved in, or provide coverage for, abortion." In a statement, Fleming announced the bill was intended to protect healthcare providers that are pro-life. If enacted it would give access to courts (heretofore unavailable) by healthcare providers who feel they have been discriminated against because of their refusal (based on conscience) to provide abortion services. For legislative expediency the text was put into a senate shell bill S. 304. The senate bill was passed on April 28, 2015, and it was passed by the house in a 245 to 182 vote on July 13, 2016, but it was not signed into law by President Barack Obama.

==== The Abortion Non-Discrimination Act (ANDA) ====
Under the federal Weldon Amendment, federal funding can be withheld from government entities that discriminate against healthcare providers who refuse to provide or cover abortion services. In 2014, California began enforcing a 1975 state law requiring health insurance plans to include abortion coverage. Representative Fleming and other Republicans argued this violated federal law and accused the Obama administration of failing to enforce the Weldon Amendment. In response, Fleming introduced legislation allowing subscribers to purchase health insurance plans that exclude abortion coverage.

==== Seniors' Tax Simplification Act of 2015 ====
With each congressional session, Fleming introduced this bill designed to improve convenience and lower tax-filing costs to seniors. Though a senior's income may be limited to only Social Security benefits, the IRS requires all senior citizens to use the long form 1040 to file taxes. This act was designed to reduce the tax filing for seniors to one simple page, saving time, complexity, and cost.

==== Federal Duck Stamp ====
Fleming served on the Committee on Natural Resources and chaired the Subcommittee on Fisheries, Wildlife, Oceans and Insular Affairs. As such he introduced legislation with Ron Kind to raise the price of the Federal Duck Stamp by $10 to $25, bringing the stamp in line with inflation as an increase had not occurred for many years. The purpose of the legislation was to preserve habitat in critical migratory waterfowl flyways to allow duck populations to grow. The legislation was supported by hunting groups, including Ducks Unlimited, the National Rifle Association of America, and the Theodore Roosevelt Conservation Partnership. For his work on the House Committee on Natural Resources on behalf of migratory birds, Fleming was given an award by Ducks Unlimited and the 2014 North American Migratory Bird Joint Venture Champion award for a Legislator by the Association of Joint Venture Management Boards. The Fleming Duck Stamp bill passed the House and Senate by voice vote and was signed into law by President Obama on December 18, 2014, as it had broad bipartisan support.

==== Amtrak Secure Transportation of Firearms Act ====
On October 13, 2009, Fleming introduced the Amtrak Secure Transportation of Firearms Act. It was supported by the National Rifle Association. The bill passed the House and Senate and was signed into law by President Obama in December 2009.

=== Committee assignments ===
Upon his election to the U.S. House of Representatives, Fleming was assigned to these committees:

- Committee on Armed Services
  - Subcommittee on Tactical Air and Land Forces
  - Subcommittee on Strategic Forces;
- Committee on Natural Resources,
  - Subcommittee on Energy and Mineral Resources
  - Subcommittee on Fisheries, Wildlife, Oceans and Insular Affairs (Chairman)

=== Caucus memberships ===
- The Republican Study Committee
- The Tea Party Caucus
- The Israel Allies Caucus
- Republican co-chair of Congressional Addiction, Treatment and Recovery Caucus
- Co-chair of the House Values Action Team (VAT)
- Co-founder of the House Freedom Caucus
- Co-chair of the GOP Doctors Caucus
- Co-chair and founder of the Long Range Strike Caucus
- Congressional Constitution Caucus
- Congressional Arts Caucus
- Congressional Long Range Strike Caucus

== 2016 Louisiana U.S. Senate campaign ==
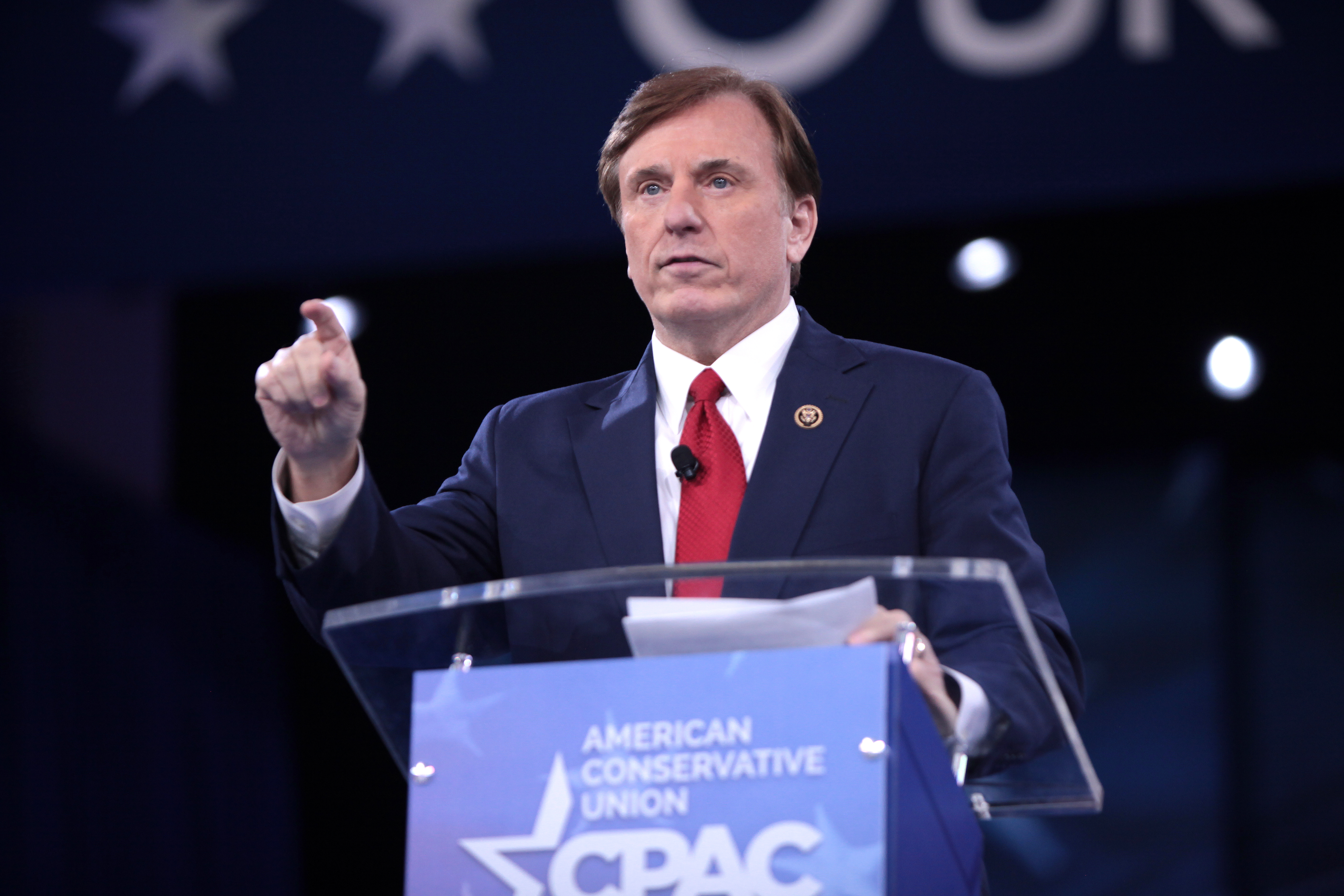
U.S. Congressman John Fleming of Louisiana speaking at the 2016 Conservative Political Action Conference (CPAC) in National Harbor, Maryland

On December 10, 2014, KTBS, a Shreveport based ABC television station, reported that Fleming was considering running for the Senate seat held by David Vitter, who ran in the 2015 gubernatorial election. Vitter would have had to vacate his seat had he been elected as governor. In a statement, Fleming said "If Senator Vitter is elected as Governor, I would certainly be interested in running for the seat he would vacate."

On December 7, 2015, Fleming officially announced his candidacy for the United States Senate. He was a candidate to succeed Republican Senator David Vitter, who did not seek a third term in 2016. "I not only fought the liberals in Washington, D.C., I also fought the leadership of my own party when they were all too willing to compromise on our conservative principles," Fleming said in his statement of candidacy.

Fleming finished in fifth place in the primary election with 204,026 votes (11 percent), behind Democrat Caroline Fayard, fellow Republican U.S. representative Charles Boustany, Democrat Foster Campbell, and Republican Louisiana State Treasurer John Neely Kennedy who eventually won the election.

== Trump administration ==
=== Deputy Assistant Secretary of Health Technology Reform ===
After completing four terms in the U.S. House of Representatives, Fleming was appointed Deputy Assistant Secretary of Health Technology Reform in the Office of the National Coordinator for Health Information Technology of the United States Department of Health and Human Services on March 23, 2017 by President Donald Trump. On being appointed, Fleming said that his goals were to remove restrictions that prevent physicians from using newer digital filing systems. and to promote greater usability and interoperability of healthcare information technology systems. Fleming lamented the fractured nature of electronic health record technology and said that he supported "every American having a single, unified health record that resides in the cloud." He said he planned "to advocate policies that would encourage physicians to use technology in their medical practice." He hoped to remove barriers to the transfer of data.

Fleming implemented the first private practice electronic health record system in Louisiana in 1997. His private medical practice was fully paperless by 1999. Fleming's work was primarily focused in the area of streamlining the required workflow in the use of technology and the reduction of the burden on health care clinicians. He explained that the cause of this burden is due primarily to three major areas: outdated clinical record guideline requirements designed for billing purposes, prior authorization requirements, and health care quality measurement and reporting. He anticipated that a new, rapidly developing clinician burden in response to the nationwide opioid crisis and prescription drug monitoring programs will need better design and streamlining as they are being implemented. Fleming worked closely with government and private sector organizations to bring automation to the prior authorization process.

=== Assistant Secretary of Commerce for Economic Development ===
On June 20, 2018, President Trump nominated Fleming to serve as Assistant Secretary of Commerce for Economic Development, leading the Economic Development Administration. His appointment was approved by a vote of 15–5 in the United States Senate Committee on Environment and Public Works on August 1, 2018. On March 7, 2019, his nomination was confirmed by a vote of 67–30 in the senate. After assuming office, Fleming promoted the benefits of the new tax law, Tax Cuts and Jobs Act of 2017; especially the opportunity zone portion as a new EDA tool to enhance the agency's effectiveness in revitalizing economically depressed communities. His stated goal for the EDA: "We don't try to make successful communities more successful. We want to make uncertain, unsuccessful communities successful, and hopefully even more successful over time." Fleming left his position in March 2020 upon his appointment to a position at the White House. Dana Gartzke took over Fleming's position in an acting capacity at the time of his departure from the EDA.

=== White House Deputy Chief of Staff ===
On March 23, 2020, Fleming was detailed from his position as Assistant Secretary of the Economic Development Administration and appointed as Assistant to the President for Planning and Implementation, serving as White House Deputy Chief of Staff. He was a senior advisor to chief of staff Mark Meadows. Additional duties and functions included serving on the White House Coronavirus Task Force as well as leading a presidential team to review and write a presidential report on lessons learned from the pandemic. Before leaving office he was given the Department of Defense Medal for Distinguished Public Service by Acting Secretary of Defense Christopher C. Miller. His White House tenure ended January 20, 2021.

== Louisiana State Treasurer ==
John Fleming was elected as Louisiana State Treasurer on November 18, 2023. He took office on January 8, 2024, being sworn in by Mike Johnson, the Speaker of the United States House of Representatives. As State Treasurer, Fleming is Chairman of the State Bond Commission.

== 2026 Louisiana U.S. Senate campaign ==
On December 4, 2024, Fleming officially announced his candidacy to run in the 2026 United States Senate election in Louisiana. He sought to unseat incumbent Republican Bill Cassidy. Fleming received the endorsements of U.S. representatives Paul Gosar, Scott Perry, and Marlin Stutzman, among others.

On January 17, 2026, Donald Trump endorsed U.S. representative Julia Letlow over Fleming and Cassidy. Months later, Fleming accused the Letlow campaign of offering him a job as deputy director of the Centers for Disease Prevention and Control, "so that I would step down from the U.S. Senate campaign." The Letlow campaign denied these allegations.

Fleming and Letlow defeated Cassidy in the primary and advanced to a June 27 runoff election.

He was criticized publicly by Governor Jeff Landry, Attorney General Liz Murrill, U.S. representative Steve Scalise, and U.S. representative Clay Higgins for posting an artificial intelligence generated video of Letlow. However, it is noted that Landry, Murrill, and Scalise had all already endorsed Letlow.

In the runoff, Fleming received 43.1%, losing to congresswoman Julia Letlow.

== Political positions ==
Fleming is a politically conservative Republican. He was ranked as the 109th most conservative House Republican in the 114th United States Congress by GovTrack.

=== Abortion ===
Fleming is an opponent of abortion. Fleming voted to bar federal funds from being used for any health benefits coverage including coverage of abortion. Fleming also voted to remove federal funding from Planned Parenthood. Fleming was a cosponsor of the Sanctity of Human Life Act, which declared that "each human life begins with fertilization."

In 2012, Fleming attracted attention when an article from the satirical newspaper The Onion (titled "Planned Parenthood Opens $8 Billion Abortionplex") was posted on his Facebook page with the apparently sincere message, "More on Planned Parenthood, abortion by wholesale". The post was deleted after commenters highlighted the article's satirical nature.

=== Same-sex marriage ===
In 2012, before the Obergefell v. Hodges Supreme Court decision, Fleming condemned a marriage-like ceremony that took place at Fort Polk, Louisiana, which lied within Fleming's congressional district, between an enlisted woman and civilian woman. Fleming said that the ceremony "should not have occurred at Fort Polk, especially since the people of Louisiana have made it abundantly clear that our state does not recognize same-sex marriages or civil unions" and characterized the event as part of a "liberal social experiment with our military."

Fleming condemned the Supreme Court's 2015 decision of Obergefell v. Hodges, which found a constitutional right to same-sex marriage. Fleming stated that he was "greatly disappointed" and disagreed with the decision. Fleming was also a co-sponsor of The First Amendment Defense Act, a bill designed to protect religious institutions from being forced to perform marriage or other ceremonies that violate their teachings.

=== Religion in the military ===
In June 2013, Fleming sponsored an amendment to the 2014 National Defense Authorization Act requiring the military "to accommodate, except in cases of military necessity, actions and speech, reflecting the conscience, moral principles, or religious beliefs of the member." This amendment was supported by Christian conservative groups such as the Family Research Council, which asserted that religious freedom was under attack in the military, and opposed by atheist groups such as the Military Religious Freedom Foundation and the Military Association of Atheists and Freethinkers, which asserted that the amendment was unconstitutional and would enable Christian proselytizing in the military. The amendment drew objections from the White House, with a spokesman saying that commanders need discretion to, "address potentially problematic speech and actions within their units" and that the measure would "have a significant adverse effect on good order, discipline, morale and mission accomplishment." The amendment passed with a bipartisan vote by the House Armed Services Committee. A similar measure passed the Senate and compromise language was adopted into the final NDAA signed into law.

In 2013, after the Navy rejected an atheist's request to join the Navy as a chaplain, the U.S. House passed a measure, sponsored by Fleming, that bars the Defense Department from appointing atheist chaplains. Fleming said, "The notion of an atheist chaplain is nonsensical; it's an oxymoron." Democratic Congressman Rob Andrews of New Jersey said that it was "wrong" to tell an irreligious service member that they "must go to a mental health professional in order to receive counseling, rather than someone who comes from their philosophical faith or tradition." Fleming ended the debate by saying, "an atheist chaplain is the last person in the world that a dying soldier should meet with when they need that last moment of counseling in their life." The amendment passed into the 2014 House DOD appropriations bill For his work on religious freedom and material support of the military chaplaincy during his tenure on the House Armed Services Committee, Fleming was given the first ever Torchbearer for Religious Freedom award in 2014, by the Chaplain Alliance for Religious Liberty.

=== Taxes ===
In a September 19, 2011, interview on MSNBC in which Fleming was critical of President Obama's proposed plan to increase taxes, he was questioned about his businesses receiving what was reported to be $6.3 million in gross income. Fleming responded to host Chris Jansing by saying The amount that I have to invest in my business and feed my family is more like $600,000 of that $6.3 million... so by the time I feed my family I have, maybe $400,000 left over to invest in new locations, upgrade my locations, buy more equipment." When Jansing asked Fleming if he thought the "average person" might be unsympathetic to Fleming's position, Fleming responded, "Class warfare never created a job...This is not about attacking people who make certain incomes. You know in this country, most people feel that being successful in their business is a virtue, not a vice, and once we begin to identify it as a vice, this country is going down."

Fleming's remarks were widely reported and resulted in considerable commentary. Bruce Alpert, of The Times-Picayune, reported that "on liberal blogs, Fleming was portrayed as insensitive to millions of working Americans who are struggling to meet expenses in the face of high unemployment and stagnant wages." Josh Beavers, publisher of the Minden Press-Herald in Fleming's hometown, wrote an editorial which stated, "[Fleming's] sentiment was only that the more taxes he pays the fewer people he can employ. High taxes on business owners thwart economic activity."

=== Internal Revenue Service ===
Fleming supported abolishing the Internal Revenue Service as a candidate to the U.S. House of Representatives. As a congressman, he wrote an article calling for the impeachment of John Koskinen, the commissioner of internal revenue. With the support of the House Freedom Caucus, Fleming utilized a rarely used parliamentary procedure called a privileged motion to force a vote on impeachment of John Koskinen. Fleming went to the floor of the House and read the motion on July 13, 2016, after filing it in writing the day before. Though the motion required a vote on impeachment, House leadership and the Freedom Caucus negotiated a compromise for Koskinen to return for an additional hearing to learn more about his actions in the scandal. Koskinen returned, voluntarily, on September 21, 2016, to face an impeachment hearing.

=== Israel ===
Fleming, while in Congress, was a strong supporter of Israel, which he visited twice during his term in Congress.

=== Donald Trump ===
Fleming supported Donald Trump in the 2016 Republican Party presidential primaries. Fleming has praised Trump's policies on immigration and trade and said Trump is far more convincing as a conservative than Mitt Romney, John McCain, and George W. Bush.

== Awards and acknowledgments ==
- In 2007, Fleming was chosen as the Louisiana Academy of Family Physicians' "Louisiana Family Practice Physician of the Year."
- For both 2010 and 2011, the first two years the award was given, Fleming was given first place by the House Republican Conference in the "New Media Challenge" for highest performance in the then new digital/social media platform.
- Torchbearer for Religious Freedom award (2014) by the Chaplain Alliance for Religious Liberty.
- North American Migratory Bird Joint Venture Champion award (2014), issued by Association of Joint Venture Management Boards and Ducks Unlimited.
- Distinguished Alumnus of the Year Award by the University of Mississippi Medical Center (2019)
- Department of Defense Medal for Distinguished Public Service, issued by Acting Secretary of Defense Christopher C. Miller (January 2021)

== Personal life ==
Fleming married Cynthia Bishop in 1978. The couple have four children. He resides in the city of Minden in Webster Parish, Louisiana.

Fleming is a second cousin (five generations removed) to the former speaker of the United States House of Representatives Henry Clay of Kentucky. Fleming is a member of Sons of the American Revolution and Jamestowne Society.

== See also ==
- Physicians in the United States Congress

U.S. House of Representatives
Preceded by Jim McCrery	Member of the U.S. House of Representatives from Louisiana's 4th congressional district 2009–2017	Succeeded by Mike Johnson
Party political offices
Preceded by John Schroder	Republican nominee for Treasurer of Louisiana; 2023	Most recent
Political offices
Preceded by John Schroder	Treasurer of Louisiana; 2024–present	Incumbent
U.S. order of precedence (ceremonial)
Preceded by Chris John as Former US Representative	Order of precedence of the United States as Former US Representative	Succeeded by David W. Evans as Former US Representative
