= Cosker =

Cosker is a surname. Notable people with the surname include:

- Dean Cosker (born 1978), English cricketer
- John Cosker, American boat builder

== See also ==
- McCosker
