= Julius Montgomery =

American technical professional and politician (1929–2020)

Julius Marvin Montgomery was an American technical professional and politician. He was the first Black man ever hired at the RCA Development Lab at Cape Canaveral, and the first Black student to enroll at Brevard Engineering College (now Florida Institute of Technology or Florida Tech). He was also the first black city council member of Melbourne, Florida.

== Early life and education ==
Growing up in Alabama, Julius Montgomery said, "I had not talked to a white person in my life until I was in the service. No conversation. That's the way it was." Montgomery enrolled at Tuskegee Institute. He understood exactly which jobs Southern society would allow Blacks to hold at the time. Janitor and "concrete work" were the main ones, he said, "but you couldn't be the boss." Though he was interested in science, he had learned from a cousin's experience just how hard it would be to become a doctor. "My cousin had to go to Morehouse in Georgia, because they wouldn't let him go to the school in Alabama," he said. His cousin applied for medical school and they told him, ”You can't go here, boy." Montgomery continued. "They would send you out of the state back in those days. And they paid for it! First, you have to apply to the school to be turned down by the state. And then they would give you an option of going to another school." With employment options so narrow, Montgomery made a conscious choice to study a trade rather than to focus on academics. At Tuskegee, he studied to be a linotype operator.

Montgomery served in the United States Air Force after college. The government had desegregated the Air Force before it drafted him, and Montgomery remembered, "walking into this barracks full of all these guys -- white guys -- and I said ‘Good God!’ I sat on my bunk and said ‘How in the world will I be able to identify them? They all look alike to me!’” In the Air Force he received a first-class radio telephone operator's license.

== Integrating Cape Canaveral ==
When Julius Montgomery came to Cape Canaveral in 1956, the Ku Klux Klan controlled east central Florida. The Orange County Sheriff was a Klansmen, as were city commissioners, Alderman, and county commissioners. One historian has said, "Local businessmen joined the Klan almost like joining the Rotary club." In the Klan’s wake, of course, came lynching. In the Southern states where the space program was based, Florida had the highest lynching rate per capita, so the racial animus was palpable on Montgomery's first day. Julius Montgomery was The First, but he shouldered a burden other racial pioneers did not. Unlike Jackie Robinson, Guy Bluford and Mae Jemison, as Montgomery made his way to the building that housed the RCA Development Lab, there were no columnists from the black press cheering and urging progress, no one from the NAACP to offer legal or moral support. Julius Montgomery was utterly alone. As he remembered it, "I was a strange person coming into an all-white building. All white." As he entered his new workplace, "Nobody would shake my hand," he recalled. One by one each of his coworkers turned away. "I got to the last fellow," he said, "and I said ‘Hello, I’m Julius Montgomery.’ He said, ‘Look boy, that’s no way to talk to a white man!’" In a story indicative of who Julius Montgomery was (one he told many times during his life), "I said, ‘Ah, forgive me, oh great, white bastard. What should I call you?’ And I laughed, and he laughed and he shook my hand."

Montgomery began his career as a member of the "Range Rats," technicians who repaired malfunctioning ballistic missiles. Their work mostly involved developing circuits, as there was no "over-the-counter equipment to do the jobs" at the time, Montgomery said. The team also travelled out to the ships that, he said, "searched the skies for anything the Russians were doing" to perform maintenance on their satellite equipment.

== Integrating Florida Tech ==
Montgomery was a pioneer not just at Cape Canaveral. Every year, at its Martin Luther King Jr. Day commemoration, Florida Tech presents the Julius Montgomery Pioneer Award. The award exists because at a pivotal time in the history of the country and the school, Montgomery allowed Florida Tech to remain segregated, at harm to himself but to the benefit of the institution. His sacrifice and generosity were so significant that without it, the school would have been “Tossed out on the street,” in the words of Florida Tech founder Jerome P. Keuper. Florida Tech started as Brevard Engineering College (BEC) when Keuper, then a senior engineer in the U.S. Air Force Missile Test Project, told his bosses at RCA that he wanted to open a school to keep workers up to date on the state of the art in engineering. BEC originated in three rented classrooms at Eau Gallie Junior High School. Not too long after opening, the school found itself in the midst of a controversy started inadvertently by Julius Montgomery. Keuper had put up a notice asking people to enroll at his new school. It also asked them to list where they had done their undergraduate work. “I signed it,” Montgomery said. “I put down Tuskegee.”

Within days, the Brevard County superintendent of schools was on the phone to Keuper, telling him the school system was canceling BEC’s contract to rent the classrooms. The superintendent said he was worried about traffic jams “and other things.” According to Montgomery, he was one of those “other things.” As he told it, the superintendent said, “I’m sorry, but this fellow here is from Tuskegee, so he must be Black. He cannot come to this classroom.” The ultimatum was clear: Expel this Black man, or close the school. The next day, Montgomery said, while he was at his workbench, there was a message over the intercom: “Julius Montgomery, come to the office, please.” There, he was introduced to Keuper. “I said, ‘Yes, Dr. Keuper, what can I do for you?’ He said, ‘Well, I need your help.’ And the help they needed was for me to take my name off of that list so that he could start his new college.” It would only be for a short time, Keuper promised. As Montgomery remembered, Keuper said, “As soon as I get my own buildings, you are welcome.” Thhappened in 1959; five years after Brown v. Board of Education, four years after Rosa Parks stayed in her seat and said “No,” and just a few months before young men would sit down at a segregated lunch counter in Greensboro, North Carolina. Montgomery thought for a minute. “I said, ‘Well, OK.’ For the better good of everybody, I took my name off the list.” The school could stay segregated. That Florida Tech created an award in Montgomery’s honor speaks to the existential nature of his decision. After he dropped out, the superintendent dropped his threat. Several years later, after BEC got its own buildings, Keuper kept his word: The school desegregated, and Montgomery re-enrolled.

Days before Montgomery’s death, the school also awarded him an honorary doctorate in humane letters.

== Florida Politics ==
Julius Montgomery's story is one of many from the space program's African American pioneers that does not comport with the civil rights achievements you find in the standard high school textbook. Not everyone achieved their ends by marching, picketing, and saying "no." Instead, Julius Montgomery applied the principles of self-help and -- often -- accommodation to reach the same ends. It worked for him, but he said the Black community did not always understand. "I got a lot of problems from the Black community," he said.

Those problems hurt Montgomery early in his political career. "First time that I ran for City Council in 1956, we had fourteen precincts," he said. "I took all of the precincts except one -- except mine" -- the Black precinct. While he understood the reason for that; nonetheless, "I was really disheartened. I was really shocked." In time, he found an advisor, a white man from New Jersey. "He said, 'Do you want to win, or do you want to be loved in your Black precinct, which only had about nine hundred or six hundred votes? You can't win. You've got to go to the other side to get them.' So we did." In 1969, at a time when fewer than 50 African Americans held elected office in the former Confederate states, Julius Montgomery attained yet another milestone, when he became the first African American ever to win a seat on the Melbourne City Council. He continued to run and win until he retired in 1977.

== Conclusion ==
In 2010, Montgomery was invited to the Smithsonian National Air and Space Museum for the museum's annual African-American Family Day. He appeared on a panel alongside Morgan Watson, NASA's first Black engineer; and astronauts Leland Melvin (just back from the International Space Station), and Dr. Mae Jemison, NASA's first Black female astronaut. Montgomery retold his "Oh Great White Bastard" story on the panel (modifying the punchline for the children in the audience). Later on, he sidled over to Leland Melvin and looked up (the astronaut, a former wide receiver for the Detroit Lions, towered over Montgomery) with wide-eyed awe. “I’ll tell you,” Montgomery said, “You astronauts; you’re the bravest people I ever met.” Leland Melvin return the look and his grin broke into a wide, beaming smile. “No, sir” he said. “I heard your story out there. You are the bravest person I ever met.” And Julius Montgomery laughed and Leland Melvin laughed and they shook hands.

== Death ==
Montgomery died on January 22, 2020, at a nursing home in Melbourne, Florida. He was 90 years old. The cause of death was heart failure, according to his daughter Gaye Montgomery. Gaye established a scholarship at Florida Tech in her father's memory in 2022.
