= Addiction, Treatment and Recovery Caucus =

The Congressional Addiction, Treatment, and Recovery Caucus is bi-partisan caucus of the United States House of Representatives established in 2004 by Rep. Jim Ramstad. The Caucus is currently co-chaired by Rep. Paul Tonko (D-NY) and Rep. Dave Joyce (R-OH).

According to the Caucus' webpage, its mission is:

"to raise awareness and increase education regarding substance abuse and addiction treatment. According to the National Survey on Drug Use and Health, 23.5 million people aged 12 or older needed treatment for an illicit drug or alcohol abuse problem in 2009, and only 2.6 million—11.2 percent of those who needed treatment—received it at a specialty facility. Furthermore, substance abuse costs our nation more than $484 billion per year through lost earnings, health care expenditures, and costs associated with crime and accidents.This issue is also a pressing concern with our service men and women. The National Institute of Drug Abuse reports that combined with PTSD and TBI, substance abuse is a key concern with returning veterans. Prescription drug abuse has doubled among U.S. military personnel from 2002 to 2005 and tripled between 2005 and 2008. This caucus aims to help decrease the negative stigma that comes with these diseases and improve the lives of the people around the country suffering from addiction and substance abuse."

== Current Membership ==
Democrats	Republicans
Rep. John Barrow	
Rep. Sheila Jackson Lee	Rep. Shelley Moore Capito
Rep. Karen Bass	Rep. John Carter
Rep. Tim Bishop	Rep. Tom Cole
Rep. Bruce Braley	Rep. John C. Fleming*
Rep. Mike Capuano	Rep. Jim Gerlach
Lois Capps	Rep. Tim Griffin
Rep. Tony Cardenas	Rep. Tom Latham
Rep. Donna Christian-Christensen	Rep. Gary Miller
Rep. William Lacy Clay, Jr	Rep. Mike Rogers
Rep. Gerry Connolly	Rep. Mike Simpson
Rep. Elijah Cummings	Rep. Chris Smith
Rep. Danny Davis	Rep. Lee Terry
Rep. Lloyd Doggett	Rep. Joe Wilson
Rep. Eliot Engel	
Rep. Gene Green	
Rep. Rush Holt	
Rep. Jared Huffman	
Rep. Steve Israel	
Rep. Henry "Hank" Johnson	
Rep. Marcy Kaptur	
Rep. William Keating	
Rep. Joseph Kennedy	
Rep. Ron Kind	
Rep. James Langevin	
Rep. Rick Larsen	
Rep. Sheila Jackson Lee	
Rep. Barbara Lee	
Rep. Sander M. Levin	
Rep. Dave Loebsack	
Rep. Stephen F. Lynch	
Rep. Carolyn Maloney	
Rep. Jim Matheson	
Rep. Carolyn McCarthy	
Rep. Betty McCollum	
Rep. Jim McDermott	
Rep. Jim McGovern	
Rep. Mike McIntyre	
Rep. Gregory Meeks	
Rep. Jim Moran	
Rep. Grace Napolitano	
Rep. Bill Pascrell, Jr.	
Rep. Collin Peterson	
Rep. David Price	
Rep. Nick Rahall	
Rep. Charles Rangel	
Rep. Tim Ryan*	
Rep. Jan Schakowsky	
Rep. Loretta Sanchez	
Rep. Carol Shea-Porter	
Rep. Paul Tonko**	
Rep. Chris Van Hollen	
Rep. Henry Waxman	
* Chairman	** Vice-Chairman

== See also ==
Caucuses of the United States Congress
