= David T. Cloft =

American Army shooter

LTC (R) David T. Cloft
- Born: David Thomas Cloft; Alpena, Michigan, US
- Education: US Military Academy, Florida Institute of Technology
- Occupation: U.S. Army (competitive shooter)
- Writing career
- Pen name: Dave Cloft
- Years active: 1985- present

David T. Cloft is a competitive smallbore and long range rifle shooter from the United States, who has won seven National Championships and has set 11 US National Records. In 1999, he became the first American to be Knighted by the Princess of Buedingen, Germany, after winning their annual Schutzenfest. He formerly served as a United States Army officer and retired at the rank of lieutenant colonel.

== Early life and education ==
Cloft was born and raised in Alpena, Michigan. At the age of 10, he began competitive shooting with the local 4-H program. He graduated magna cum laude from the Alpena High School in 1993. Upon graduation, he was recruited to shoot on the NCAA Rifle team at the United States Military Academy at West Point, New York. He graduated with his Bachelor of Science degree in Environmental Engineering in 1997. He has a Master of Science degree in Operations Research from the Florida Institute of Technology.

== Military career ==
After being commissioned as a 2nd lieutenant, he was assigned to the 1-1 Cavalry Squadron, Buedingen, Germany. During his military career, Cloft competed for the US Army Marksmanship Unit, US Army Reserve Shooting Team, and US National Rifle Team. He has also been awarded the President's Hundred Tab and US Army Distinguished Rifleman badge.

== Sporting career and related interests ==
While in Buedingen, he joined the Buedinger Schutzengesellschaft and competed for the local German shooting team. In 1999, he became the first American to win the annual Schutzenfest, and in doing so was Knighted by Princess Elizabeth of Buedingen. He holds 11 National Records, and seven US National Championships. He won the Andrus National Trophy in 2010 for .308 Palma using iron sights at 1000 yards.

In 2011, he finished 15th in the world while attending the International Fullbore Palma Championships in Brisbane, Australia.

In 2013, he placed 5th in the Palma Match at Camp Perry, and became a member of the Palma Twenty. He has received the NRA Smallbore Prone Distinguished badge. He holds NRA High Master classifications in both high power rifle and long-range rifle disciplines, and Master (highest level) in smallbore prone and position competition.

He is also an avid outdoorsman and hunter.

== Awards and legacy ==
Cloft was inducted into the Alpena High School Hall of Fame in 2012.
