= Morgan Watson =

American engineer and academic (born 1943)

Morgan M. Watson
- Born: November 25, 1943 (age 82); United States
- Education: Southern University
- Known for: One of the first African American engineers at NASA
- Scientific career
- Fields: Engineering, mechanical engineering
- Workplaces: Southern University, NASA

Morgan M. Watson (born November 25, 1943) is an American engineer and Professor of Engineering at Southern University in Baton Rouge, Louisiana. In 1963, he became part of the first cohort of African American engineers to work at NASA in the Deep South, working on the Apollo 11 mission that sent the first man to the Moon.

== Early life and education ==
Watson was raised in St. Joseph, Louisiana where he grew up picking cotton, as had his parents, grandparents, and great-grandparents. He recalled that as a youngster, he liked to take things apart and put them back together, a prelude to his future career in engineering. As a teenager, he worked in a hardware store where his boss took an interest in his report card and noticed he had a talent for mathematics and science. His boss told him that he would make a good engineer some day. While Watson didn't know what an engineer did, he followed his curiosity to the public library and started reading about engineering. Around this time, he also developed an interest in space. He pursued these interests to college, majoring in engineering at Southern University, a historically black university in Baton Rouge.

Watson challenged the color barrier early in life. When he discovered that there had been one black voter in his county during the presidential election in 1956, he and a friend decided to register to vote when they turned eighteen. At that time, southern states instituted barriers designed to prevent black people from voting, such as poll taxes and literacy tests. When Watson and his friend reached voting age, they easily passed the written test, thus becoming the first two black voters in the county.

== Career ==
=== NASA ===
In 1961, President John F. Kennedy passed an executive order that prohibited federal agencies, including NASA, from discriminating against employees on the basis of race. At the time, NASA was expanding into Alabama, Florida, Texas, Mississippi, and Louisiana — battleground areas in the fight for civil liberties. The executive order created new employment opportunities for African Americans in the south. As part of that effort towards racial integration, NASA opened a cooperative education program, in which students from Historically Black Colleges and Universities (HBCUs) — including Watson's Southern University — would alternate semesters in school with semesters spent working for the Marshall Space Flight Center (MSFC). As one of the most promising engineering students at Southern, Watson and six other young men were given exams to test their eligibility, though white students were not required to take these entrance exams. Once deemed eligible, Watson and his six peers entered the cooperative program and began work in Huntsville, Alabama in January 1964, becoming NASA's first African American engineers in the South. Watson later recalled: "We felt that the whole image of Black people was riding on us as professionals and we could not fail."

Watson began his career at NASA working in the Quality Assurance Laboratory, testing various components of the space capsule — wires, screws, and hoses, simulating how they would react in outer space to ensure they would retain their integrity during a space flight. He took advantage of training opportunities at MSFC in order to better understand the inner-workings of engines and, with that new expertise, he began working in a propulsion lab to test the Saturn IB rocket. There, he also worked on developing the heat shield for the rocket, which keeps it from absorbing excessive heat and prevents it from exploding. In 1966, he moved to New Orleans to work at NASA's Michoud Assembly Facility. There, he worked on the thermodynamics of the Saturn V rocket, which would later power Apollo 11 to the Moon. He later continued work on the rocket moving to Huntington Beach, California.

Watson also brought his expertise in computer programming to NASA when computing was still in its infancy. Having taken the first computer programming class offered at Southern University, Watson used computer code to automate some of his tasks. He taught some of the more senior NASA employees how to use computers and integrate them into their workflows.

=== Current work ===
In 1968, Watson returned to Louisiana and began working as a professor at Southern University, teaching thermodynamics at the university. He also founded the company Minority Engineers of Louisiana, the first Black-run engineering consulting company in the Deep South. At Southern University's Founders' Day ceremonies in 2016, Watson was awarded with the President's Medal of Honor. In July 2019, on the fiftieth anniversary of the Apollo Moon landing, he expressed pride in his work and gratitude for the opportunity he was given to create a legacy. He thanked his alma mater, Southern University, for helping him become a "bridge over troubled water" for their black students.
