= Al M. Niles, Jr =

United States Army Colonel

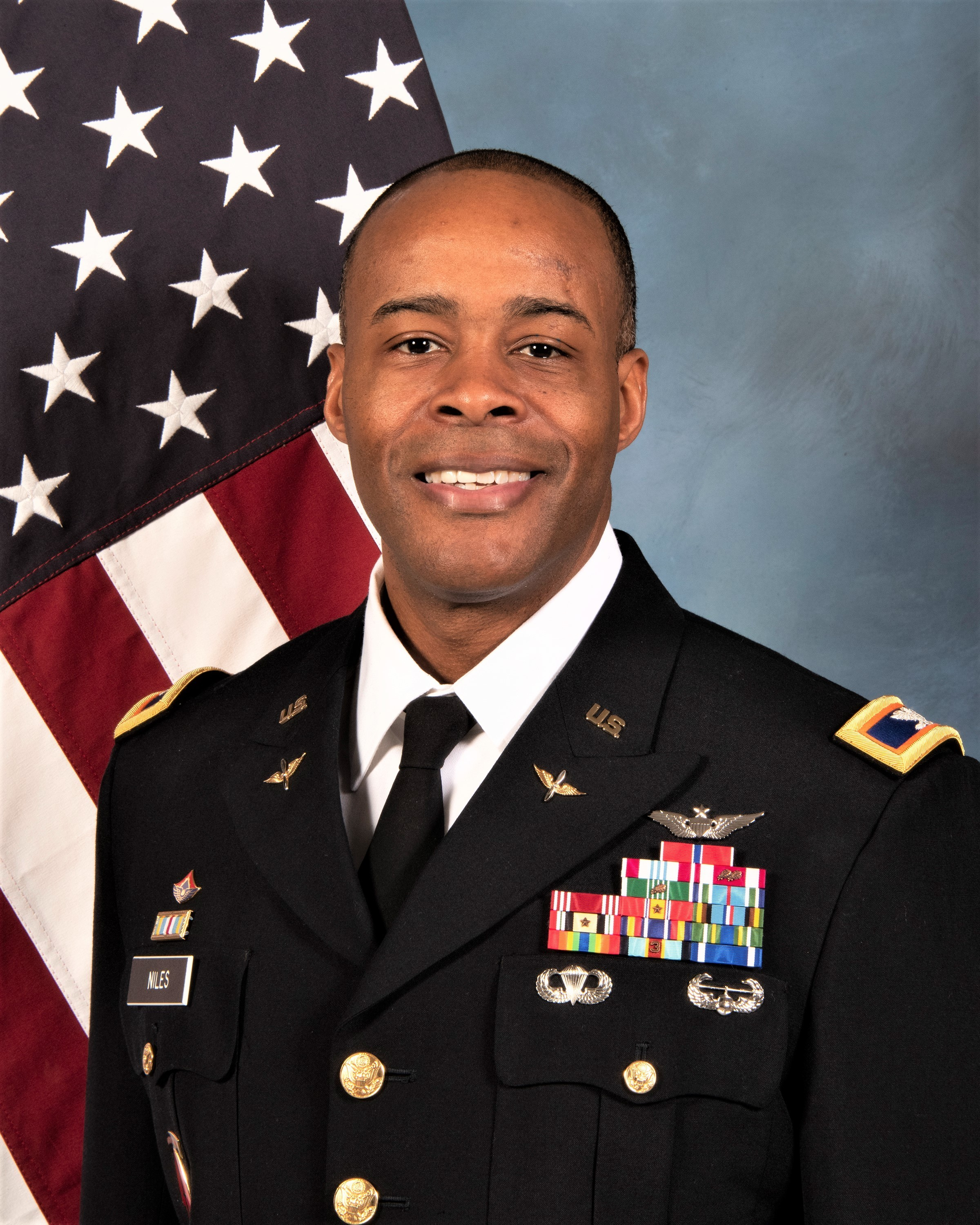
- Born: 1975 (age 50–51)
- Education: Tuskegee University (BS); Embry-Riddle Aeronautical University (MS Aeronautical Science)(M.S. Aviation Safety); Florida Institute of Technology (M.S. Acquisition Management)
- Military career
- Branch: United States Army
- Service years: 1997–present
- Rank: Colonel
- Units: United States Special Operations Command; 160th Special Operations Aviation Regiment (Airborne)
- Conflicts: Operation Iraqi Freedom; Operation Enduring Freedom
- Awards: Bronze Star Medal; Defense Meritorious Service Medal; Meritorious Service Medals (Three Oak leaf cluster); Order of Saint Maurice

Al M. Niles Jr. (born 1975) is a United States Army Colonel who is a decorated aviator and served as a wing commander during Operation Iraqi Freedom in 2005 for Task Force Warfighter.

== Career ==
Niles received his commission in 1997 through Army ROTC at Tuskegee University where he became an Army aviator. His operational assignments included the 160th Special Operations Aviation Regiment at Hunter Army Airfield in Georgia; Camp Humphreys in Korea; Fort Wainwright in Alaska; and Special Operations Command at MacDill Air Force Base in Florida. He has operated as an Airspace Command and Control Officer, Flight Operations Officer, and Maintenance Test Pilot for the CH-47D (Chinook). During Operation Iraqi Freedom in 2005, he was a Task Force Warfighter commander. He is qualified in the CH-47D Chinook, OH-58 A/C, and TH-67 (Bell 206). He's deployed to combat and operational support details with conventional and special operations troops to Iraq, Afghanistan, Bosnia, Bahrain, Kosovo, Kuwait, and Qatar.
