= Dana Gartzke =

American bureaucrat

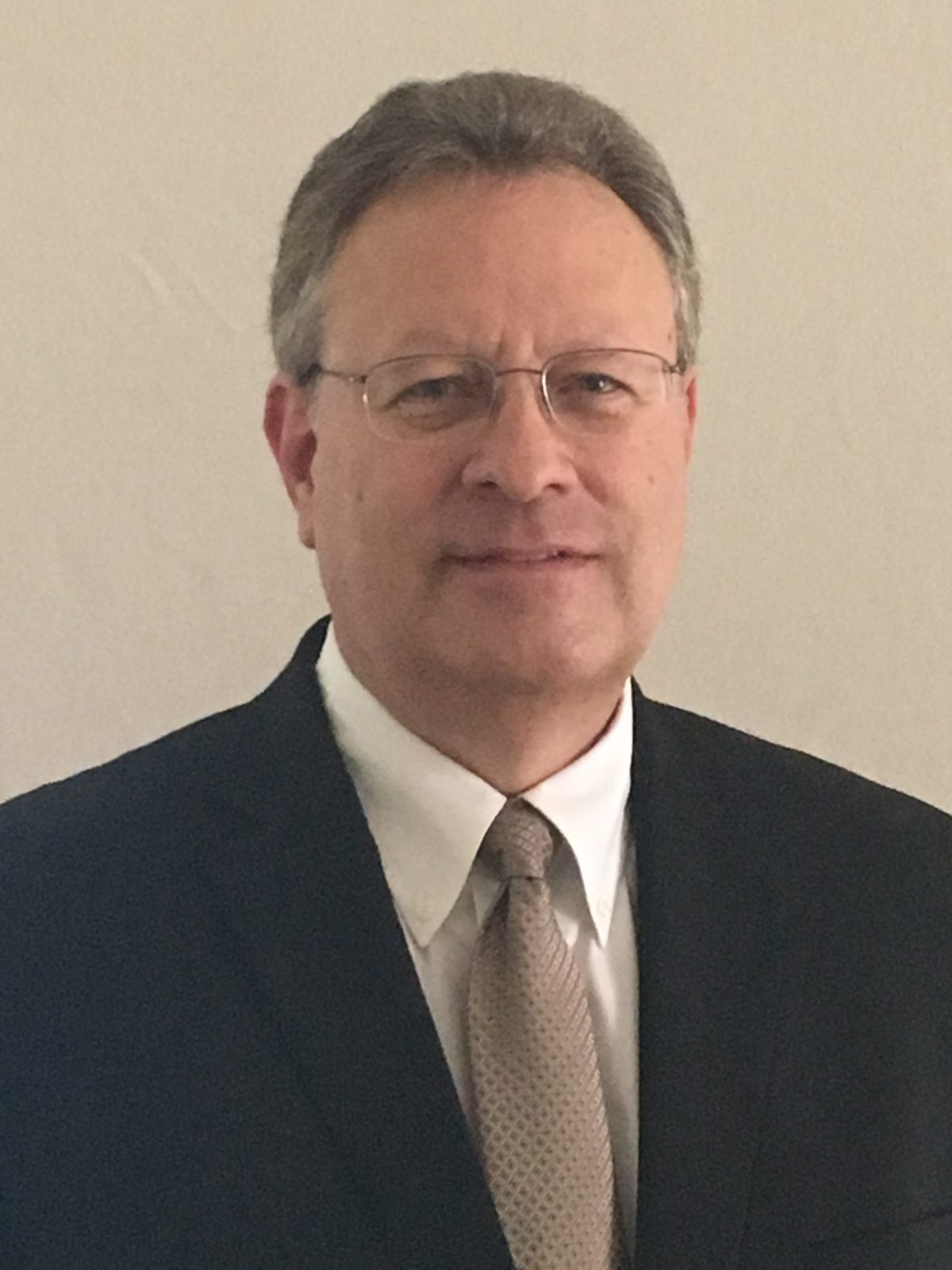

Acting Assistant Secretary of Commerce for Economic Development
- Incumbent
- Assumed office March 2020
- President: Donald Trump
- Preceded by: John Fleming

Personal details
- Party: Republican
- Education: University of South Florida (BS); Florida Institute of Technology (MBA)

Dana Gartzke is an American political advisor and government official serving as the acting Assistant Secretary of Commerce for Economic Development. Gartzke succeeded John Fleming, who left the Department of Commerce to take a role in the White House Office.

== Education ==
Gartzke earned a Bachelor of Science degree in electrical engineering from the University of South Florida and a Master of Business Administration from the Florida Institute of Technology. He also earned a certificate in negotiation from Harvard Law School.

== Career ==
Gartzke began his career at an engineering firm. In 1994, he served as the campaign manager for Dave Weldon's first run for the United States House of Representatives.

From 1995 to 2017, Gartzke worked in the United States House of Representatives as a chief of staff to Dave Weldon, Bill Posey, and John Fleming. After Fleming was selected to serve as Assistant Secretary of Commerce for Economic Development in the first Trump administration, Gartzke was selected to serve as chief of staff of the Economic Development Administration. In March 2020, Gartzke was selected to serve as acting Assistant Secretary of Commerce for Economic Development.
