= Svafa Grönfeldt =

Svafa Grönfeldt is an Icelandic business woman, author, professor at the Massachusetts Institute of Technology, and former President of Reykjavík University.

She is executive vice president of organizational development at the life science company Alvogen and has been a member of the board of directors for Ossur (NASDAQ OMX) since 2007. Previously she worked in various positions at Actavis Group until she became deputy CEO of the company. She has served on various board and advisory boards including the DesignX innovation accelerator at the Massachusetts Institute of Technology. Grönfeldt published the book Service Leadership – The Quest for Competitive Advantage, in 2006, along with Judith Strother. Grönfeldt was appointed to the board of directors of Icelandair in Q1 2019.

Grönfeldt graduated with a PhD from the London School of Economics and an MSc in technical and professional communication in 1995 from Florida Institute of Technology in Melbourne, Florida. Her doctoral thesis, dated 2000, was titled The nature, impact and development of customer-oriented behaviour: A case study in an Icelandic service context.
