= Jeffrey D. Grant =

American intelligence officer

National Reconnaissance Office

Director of Office of Plans and Analysis

Personal details
- Education: Florida Institute of Technology
- Profession: Intelligence officer

Jeffrey D. Grant is an American intelligence officer who served as the Director of Office of Plans and Analysis in the National Reconnaissance Office. He had previously worked for the Central Intelligence Agency (CIA) from 1976 to 1997 in a number of senior capacities, most notably as director for satellite, launch, and ground segment development. He later became the Vice Chairman of the Space Foundation in 2019.

== Personal life ==
Grant initially attended Clemson University in 1972 before transferring to Florida Institute of Technology, and graduated with a Bachelor of Science degree in Ocean Engineering in 1975.

== Career ==
He is highly decorated and the recipient of numerous awards, including the Distinguished Intelligence Medal, the Intelligence Medal of Merit, CIA Engineer of the Year, the Intelligence Certificate of Distinction, and the CIA Certificate of Distinction.
