= Salli Setta =

American restaurateur and businesswoman (born 1965)

- Occupations: President, Red Lobster

Salli Setta (born March 3, 1965) is an American restaurateur and businesswoman. She is the former President of Red Lobster and Executive Vice President of Olive Garden American restaurant chains owned by parent company, Golden Gate Capital.

== Career ==
Setta joined Darden Restaurants in 1990 as a sales assistant at Olive Garden. She held numerous positions during her 15-year tenure with the brand, including Vice President of Brand Marketing and Senior Vice President of Culinary and Beverage. Setta graduated from the University of Central Florida with a degree in communications in 1987, and earned an MBA from the Florida Institute of Technology in 1992. She completed the Women’s Senior Leadership Program at the Kellogg School of Management. Setta was named president of Red Lobster in 2013, while Red Lobster was operated by Darden Restaurants, Inc. She served as the Executive Vice President of Marketing for Red Lobster from 2005 until July 2013, when she was named president.

In January 2016, Setta was named a board member of the Women's Foodservice Forum (WFF), the food industry's premier leadership development organization. Setta, a 25-year veteran of the restaurant industry, was selected for, "her experience leading a globally recognized brand that is committed to supporting the advancement of women and will serve two three-year terms on WFF's board."

== Awards ==
In 2003, Setta was named the Restaurant Business “Menu Strategist of the Year” and one of Nation’s Restaurant News’ “Top 50 R&D Culinarians.”
