= American Health Care Reform Act of 2013 =

Healthcare reform bill of the United States of America

- Long title: To repeal the Patient Protection and Affordable Care Act and related reconciliation provisions, to promote patient-centered health care, and for other purposes.
- Announced in: the 113th United States Congress
- Sponsored by: David P. Roe
- Number of co-sponsors: 132

Codification
- Acts repealed: Patient Protection and Affordable Care Act

Legislative history
- Introduced in the House as H.R. 3121 by David P. Roe on 09/18/2013; Committee consideration by Rules Committee, Committee on Appropriations, Committee on House Administration, Natural Resources Committee, House Judiciary Committee, Education and the Workforce Committee, Ways and Means Committee, Energy and Commerce Committee

The American Health Care Reform Act of 2013 (H.R. 3121) is a bill introduced to the 113th United States Congress on 18 September 2013. It was proposed as a counter to the Patient Protection and Affordable Care Act, but it never became a law as it did not pass a vote.

== Background ==
All Republicans in the United States House of Representatives opposed the passage of the Affordable Care Act (ACA) championed by President Barack Obama. After gaining control of the House following the 2010 elections, they moved to "repeal and replace" the ACA. Opponents offered alternatives including the Patient's Choice Act of 2009, Empowering Patients First Act of 2009 and 2013. Rep. Steve Scalise chaired the 175-member Republican Study Committee which produced the draft of the American Health Care Reform Act. Rep. Scalise told reporters, "I think we’ve done a very effective job of pointing out all the things that are bad about the president's health-care law, but people want to know what we stand for as well."

== Provisions of the bill ==
American Health Care Reform Act of 2013 - Repeals the Patient Protection and Affordable Care Act and the health care provisions of the Health Care and Education and Reconciliation Act of 2010, effective as of their enactment. Restores or revives provisions amended or repealed by such Act or such health care provisions.

Amends the Internal Revenue Code (IRC) to allow an income tax standard deduction for a specified percentage of an individual's health insurance costs, regardless of whether or not the taxpayer itemizes other deductions. Excludes the amount of such a deduction from employment taxes.

Allows a taxpayer, for earned income credit purposes, to exclude from earned income any employer contributions to a qualified accident or health plan.

Allows double additional contributions to a health savings account (HSA) if both spouses are age 55 or older and one spouse is not an account beneficiary.

Prescribes special rules for HSA coverage eligibility for certain individuals: (1) participating in a Medicare Advantage Medical Savings Account (MSA), (2) receiving periodic hospital care or medical services for a service-connected disability, (3) eligible for Indian Health Service assistance, or (4) eligible for TRICARE coverage.

Prescribes requirements for interaction of health flexible spending arrangements (FSAs) and health reimbursement arrangements with HSAs.

Prohibits the payment of health insurance premiums from HSAs, with certain exceptions.

Prescribes circumstances in which certain medical expenses incurred before establishment of an HSA may still be qualified expenses.

Prescribes requirements for protection of any HSA in a bankruptcy proceeding.

Amends title XIX (Medicaid) of the Social Security Act (SSA) to authorize additional health opportunity account demonstration programs.

Treats membership in a health care sharing ministry as coverage under a high deductible health plan.

Renames high deductible health plans as HSA qualified plans.

Allows payments from an HSA for: (1) direct primary care service arrangements, (2) certain exercise equipment and physical fitness programs, (3) certain nutritional and dietary supplements, and (4) periodic fees paid to a primary care physician for the right to receive medical services on an as-needed basis.

Increases the maximum limit on contributions to an HSA to match deductible and out-of-pocket expenses limitations.

Prescribes requirements for establishment of child health savings accounts, for which an income tax deduction shall be allowed a taxpayer equal to the aggregate cash amount paid into the account during the taxable year.

Amends the IRC to include in gross income any distributions from an HSA for an abortion.

Amends the Employee Retirement Income Security Act of 1974 (ERISA), the Public Health Service Act (PHSA), and the IRC to authorize premium and cost-sharing variances in group health plans based on certain financial incentives for participation (or lack of it) in a standards-based wellness program.

Amends the PHSA to direct the Secretary to provide a grant of up to $5 million to each state for the costs of creation and initial operation of a qualified high risk pool if it has not created such a pool as of September 1, 2013. Limits participation in such a pool to U.S. citizens and nationals.

Declares that the laws of the state designated by a health insurance issuer (primary state) shall apply to individual health insurance coverage offered by that issuer in the primary state and in any other state (secondary state), but only if the coverage and issuer comply with conditions of this Act.

Prohibits a health insurance issuer from offering, selling, or issuing individual health insurance coverage in a secondary state if its insurance commissioner does not use a risk-based capital formula for determining capital and surplus requirements for all health insurance issuers.

Amends the McCarran-Ferguson Act to declare that nothing in it shall modify, impair, or supersede the operation of any of the antitrust laws with respect to the business of health insurance (including the business of dental insurance).

Amends SSA title XI (General Provisions) to require the Secretary to make available to the public Medicare claims and payment data, including data on payments made to any provider of services or supplier.

Authorizes a state to establish a Health Plan and Provider Portal website to standardize information on: (1) health insurance plans available in the state, and (2) price and quality information on health care providers (including physicians, hospitals, and other health care institutions).

Declares that nothing in this Act shall be construed to interfere with the doctor-patient relationship or the practice of medicine.

Amends the American Recovery and Reinvestment Act of 2009 to eliminate the Federal Coordinating Council for Comparative Effectiveness Research.

Amends ERISA to prescribe requirements for establishment and governance of association health plans, which are group health plans meeting certain ERISA certification criteria whose sponsors are trade, industry, professional, chamber of commerce, or similar business associations.

Limits the commencement of a health care lawsuit, except in certain cases including fraud or intentional concealment, to three years after the date of manifestation of injury or one year after the claimant discovers, or through the use of reasonable diligence should have discovered, the injury, whichever occurs first.

Limits to $250,000 the amount of noneconomic damages in such a lawsuit, but allows a claim for the full amount of any economic damages.

Requires the court, in any health care lawsuit, to supervise the arrangements for payment of damages to protect against conflicts of interest that may have the effect of reducing the amount of damages awarded that are actually paid to claimants.

Specifies criteria for the award of punitive damages, limited to the greater of $250,000 or double the amount of economic damages.

Preempts state law with respect to health care lawsuits.

Declares that nothing in this Act shall be construed to: (1) require any health plan to provide coverage of or access to abortion services; or (2) allow the Secretary, the Secretary of the Treasury, the Secretary of Labor, or any other federal or non-federal person or entity in implementing this Act to require coverage of, or access to, abortion services.

Prohibits the use of funds authorized or appropriated by this Act to pay for any abortion or to cover any part of the costs of any health plan that includes abortion coverage, except: (1) if the pregnancy is the result of an act of rape or incest; or (2) in the case where a pregnant female suffers from a physical disorder, physical injury, or physical illness that would, as certified by a physician, place the female in danger of death unless an abortion is performed, including a life-endangering physical condition caused by or arising from the pregnancy itself.

== Tax Effects ==
Eliminate a 3.8 percent tax on investment income for high-income individuals and families. Eliminating the tax would save these taxpayers $158 billion over the next decade, according to the nonpartisan Committee on Taxation, the official scorekeeper for Congress. About 90 percent of the benefit from repealing the tax would go to the top 1 percent of earners, who make $700,000 or more, according to the nonpartisan Tax Policy Center.

Repeal an extra 0.9 percent Medicare tax on wages above $200,000 for individuals and $250,000 for married couples. Repealing the tax would save higher income families $117 billion over the next decade.

Repeal an annual fee on health providers based on market share. Repealing the tax would save health insurers $145 billion over the next decade.

Repeal an annual fee on prescription drugmakers and importers. Repealing it would save pharmaceutical companies $25 billion over the next decade.

Allow taxpayers to deduct out-of-pocket health expenses if they exceed 7.5 percent of their income. The ACA limit is 10%. Taxpayers would save $35 billion over the next decade.

Repeal a 2.3% excise tax on medical device makers and importers. Repealing it would save them $20 billion over the next decade.

== Congressional Budget office report ==
This bill was not analyzed by the Congressional Budget Office.

== Procedural history ==
H.R. 3121 was introduced into the United States House of Representatives on September 18, 2013 under the short title "American Health Care Reform Act of 2013" as a replacement for the Affordable Care Act. The bill was introduced by Rep. David P. Roe (R, TN-1). It was referred to the United States House Rules Committee, Committee on Appropriations, Committee on House Administration, Natural Resources Committee, House Judiciary Committee, Education and the Workforce Committee, Ways and Means Committee, and Energy and Commerce Committee on the same day it was introduced. The Energy Committee sent it to the Subcommittee on Health on September 20. The Natural Resources Committee sent it to the Subcommittee on Indian and Alaska Native_Affairs on September 23. On October 15, the Judiciary Committee sent it to both the Subcommittees on Constitution and Civil Justice and Regulatory Reform, Commercial And Antitrust Law.

== Debate and discussion ==
Critics of H.R. 3121 note that it would include repealing the Affordable Care Act in its entirety.

The use of Health Savings Accounts in the American Health Care Act has been criticized as of limited value to low income Americans, who would not be able to take advantage of the provision.

The Act uses state-run high-risk pools to assist people with pre-existing conditions, which could be excluded from insurance coverage upon repeal of the Affordable Care Act. These pools have typically required high rates, which may make them unaffordable for individuals with low incomes. H.R. 3121 would appropriate $25 billion to be spent over 10 years (or an average of $2.5 billion annually) to subsidize the high risk pools. The cost of covering pre-existing conditions was estimated to be between $15 and $20 billion per year, according to a 2010 National Affairs article. The bill would allow individuals to move between insurance plans and not be without coverage, including coverage for pre-existing conditions.

H.R. 3121 would attempt to create a more competitive health care market to control prices. This would be achieved through allowing insurance policies to be sold across state lines, prevent a single insurance carrier from dominating the market in any one state, and provide a website for comparing insurance plans, and prevention of federal funding of abortions. Small businesses would be allowed to pool together to negotiate lower rates. The bill strives to achieve affordable health care and increased access, but without mandates or tax increases.

It has been predicted that allowing purchase of insurance across state lines without national requirements for coverage would create a "race to the bottom." The insurance companies would try to reduce how much they would need to charge for their plans by limiting coverage. If individuals choose to purchase primarily on the cost of the plan, many people could end up with insurance offers very little coverage.

The bill would reform medical malpractice laws, including limiting non-economic damages to $250,000, in an effort to reduce costs of healthcare. Critics have noted that medical liability costs represent only about 2.4% of health care spending, so reforms will have minimal impact.

The Act consists of less than 200 pages, as compared to the 2,700-page Affordable Care Act. Supporters believe this bill to be less complex, and easier to understand and define.

== See also ==
- List of bills in the 113th United States Congress
