= National rifle team =

Traveling competitive shooting team

A national rifle team is a traveling competitive marksmanship team from a country. Multiple countries field a national rifle team, such as Belgium, Canada, China, Denmark, Finland, France, Great Britain, Greece, Italy, Netherlands, Norway, Russia, Sweden, Switzerland, and the United States. Competitions are usually a week long and have international participants.

The National Rifle Team match was also the name of a competition held in the United States beginning in 1902 and often had international participation.

== Canadian National Rifle Team ==
Oronhyatekha was on the team in 1871, and Rufus Carter was on the team in 1897. They participated in international competitions. The Canadian National Rifle Team became a coed team. The team competed internationally, such as in Mexico City in 1979 and at the National Shooting Centre in Bisley, England in 2003. The team used the C12A1 rifle with iron sights in 2003.

== Great Britain ==
At one time, Sir Henry St John Halford was the captain of the British National Rifle Team.

== United States ==
The newly formed American National Rifle Team practiced at the Creedmoor Rifle Range, New York in 1875 with Colonel H. A. Gildersleeve as the captain. This was one of the first teams from the United States to participate abroad in international competitions, which took place in Great Britain in the summer of 1875.

Some members of the team participated in the Olympic Games, such as Daniel Durben, who also served as the team's coach from 1997 to 2000. David Johnson also served on the team for several years in the 1980s, and later as a coach preparing the team for the Olympics. David T. Cloft was also on the team while serving in the United States Army.

The National Rifle Team match began in 1902 and consisted of teams of 10 shooting at distances between 200 and 1,000 yards. The New York team won for the third time in the competition held at Sea Girt, New Jersey in 1905. The National Rifle Team match in 1909 was open to all branches of the military and the organized state militias and was held at Camp Perry, Ohio. The United States Navy won the National Rifle Team match that year. The United States Marine Corps won the National Rifle Team match in 1919 and the United States Infantry won it in 1920. The United States Marine Corps won it again in 1921 in a competition with 87 teams and in 1923 with 80 teams and 800 participants, both events at Camp Perry. The United States Marine Corps won the competition for the 8th time in 1925. The United States Infantry won it in 1929 with 108 teams participating. The United States Marine Corps won the competition in 1930 and 1931.

The later events included military and civilian teams.
