= Plume (company) =

American Software-as-a-Service company

- Headquarters: Palo Alto, California
- Key people: Dan Herscovici (President and CEO); Ganesh Sundaresan (CFO); Shari Piré (Chief Legal and Privacy Officer)
- Website: www.plume.com

Plume is a Software-as-a-Service (SaaS) company that provides self-optimizing WiFi services, visibility, and network control for Communications Service Providers (CSPs) and their subscribers, such as personal households and small businesses.

The company is based in Palo Alto, California.

== History ==
Plume was founded in 2014. The company began offering its cloud-delivered services in June 2016.

In 2017, Plume raised $63 million in funding. In 2018, the company changed to a subscription model beginning with its Adaptive Wi-Fi service and new SuperPods. The SuperPods are slightly larger than the first generation pods, capable of faster speeds, and contain two integrated Ethernet ports.

In February 2019, TalkTalk, a UK-based telecommunications company, signed a deal with Plume to bring Plume Wi-Fi to TalkTalk’s broadband customers. After a month, Plume's services became available to all UK households. In November, the company expanded into Asia when it announced a deal with J:COM, Japan's largest cable-TV operator.

In November 2020, Plume acquired British Columbia-based network intelligence and security software firm Walleye. Plume also started working with POST Luxembourg.

The company works with more than 400 service providers including Comcast, Charter, Qualcomm, Cablevision, Shaw Communications, Bell Canada, and Liberty Global. It also partners with U.S. cable television cooperative NCTC, Sagemcom, and customer-premises equipment (CPE) vendors and resellers such as Technicolor and ADTRAN.

In October 2021, it was announced that Plume raised $300 million in a Series F round, bringing Plume's valuation up to $2.6 billion.

== Services ==
Plume provides an adaptive WiFi platform with cloud management services that works automatically to self-optimize network connections. It provides interoperability for homes and businesses that may be using smart devices from different manufacturers. Plume’s products are open, allowing them to work with any CSP.

Using its cloud management, Plume can identify and measure network traffic and then make changes to provide better performance. For example, if the bedrooms in a home are empty because everyone is in the living room streaming a movie in HD, Plume’s network will route more bandwidth to the streaming device in the living room. The company provides WiFi through its tri-band pods, which plug into wall outlets, or through an OpenSync integration into a CSP’s existing Customer Premises Equipment (CPE).

Plume’s services include:

- Adaptive WiFi: Plume adjusts bandwidth as load demand shifts throughout the day.
- Control: allows users to set up profiles and manage devices and usage, set individual WiFi passwords for guests, and restrict guest access to certain devices
- Motion sensing: uses WiFi radio waves to detect motion in areas of a house. The functionality uses OpenSync nodes or, Plume’s SuperPods, and connected IoT devices to provide the sensing information.
- AI Security
