= Apryl A. Alexander =

American professor in clinical and forensic psychology (born 1983)

Apryl Alexander
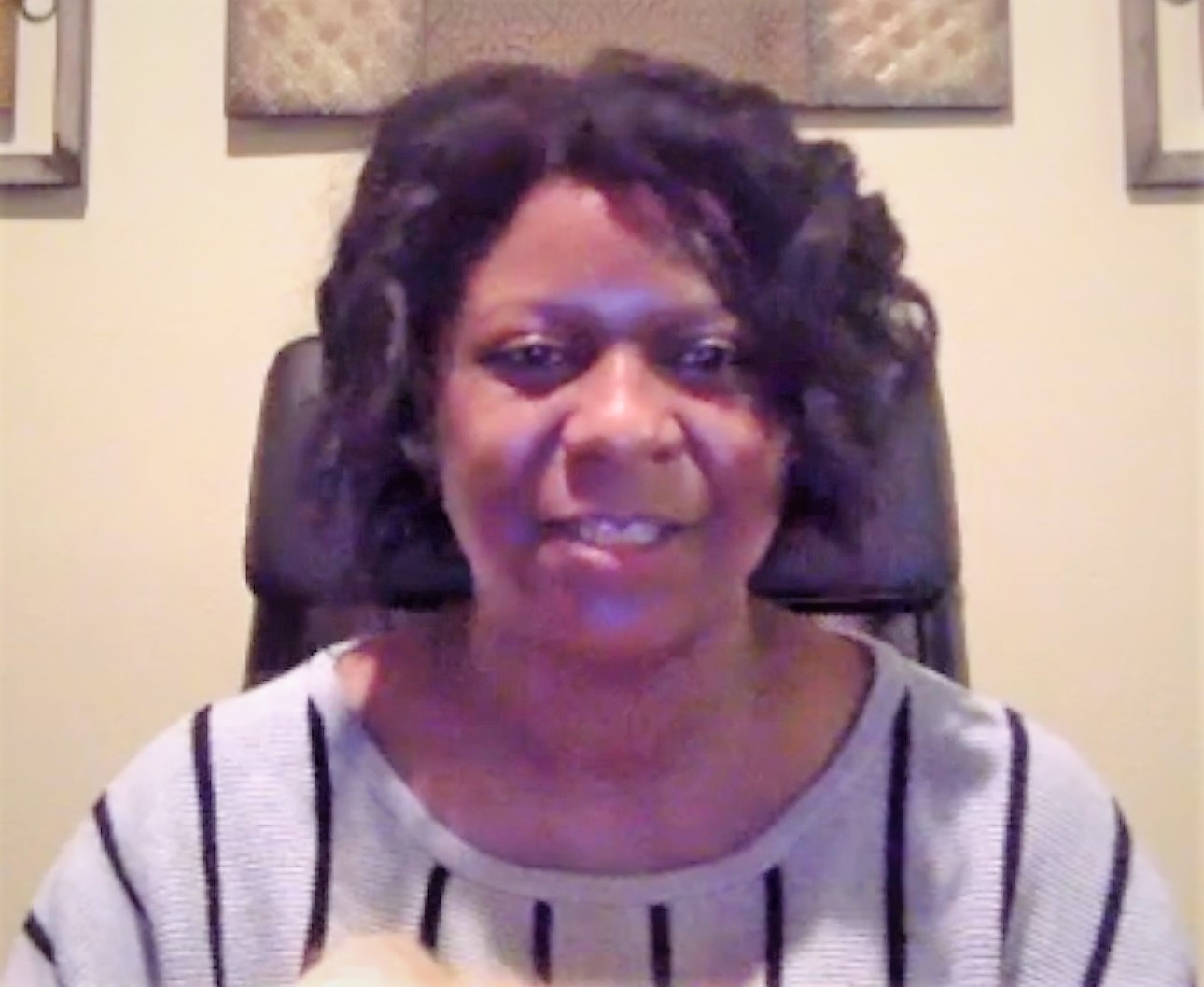
- Alexander in 2020
- Education: Virginia Polytechnic Institute, Radford University, Florida Institute of Technology
- Known for: Advocate and policy maker for proper education on sexual consent in schools
- Scientific career
- Fields: Forensic and Childhood Trauma Clinical Psychology
- Workplaces: University of Denver

Dr. Apryl A. Alexander is an American clinical and forensic psychologist who is an associate professor at the University of North Carolina at Charlotte. Dr. Alexander directed students at the Denver Forensic Institute for Research, Service and Training (Denver FIRST) under the University of Denver and engages in clinical psychology practice. She is co-founder of the University of Denver's Prison Arts Initiative where incarcerated individuals engage in a therapeutic, educational arts curricula.

== Background and Education ==
Dr. Alexander was driven to pursue higher education from a young age. In 2005, she earned a Bachelor of Science in Psychology at Virginia Polytechnic Institute and became the first woman in her family to pursue a postsecondary education. During her undergraduate education, Dr. Alexander volunteered with sexual assault and domestic violence survivors.

Dr. Alexander earned a Master of Science in Clinical Psychology at Radford University. While at Radford, she was active in community engagement and education of alcohol awareness, internet safety, and sexual assault. She worked in the Office of Substance Abuse and Sexual Assault Education and conducted exit interviews for the Radford Aware Program for students that violated alcohol policies. During her graduate studies, Dr. Alexander worked as a counsellor at the Women's Resource Center in the New River Valley in Radford, Virginia. As a CARE (Crisis Advocate Responding Effectively) companion, she provided support to adults and children who had faced sexual assault.

Dr. Alexander pursued her doctorate degree in clinical psychology at the Florida Institute of Technology. During her doctoral education, Dr. Alexander worked as a therapist and later as assistant director in The Family Learning Program which supports individuals and their family members affected by sexual abuse. Dr. Alexander concentrated in Forensic Psychology and also studied child and family therapy for people with a history of maltreatment and trauma. She obtained her master's degree in 2009, and completed her PsyD by 2012. Dr. Alexander worked in a variety of settings where she interfaced with offenders as well as victims to elucidate evidence-based approaches to addressing violence.

== Career ==
It was at Auburn University where Dr. Alexander first became an assistant clinical professor within the department of psychology. In 2016, Alexander then transitioned to the University of Denver where she became a clinical assistant professor in the Graduate School for Professional Psychology as well as the director of Denver FIRST (Forensic Institute for Research, Service, and Training), an Outpatient Competency Restoration Program. In 2017, Dr. Alexander co-founded the Prison Arts Initiative. As the co-director, from 2017 to 2019, Dr. Alexander helped design and implement therapeutic creative programming for incarcerated individuals in Colorado State Prisons.

In 2019, Dr. Alexander was appointed faculty affiliate of the Scrivner Institute of Public Policy, and in 2020 she was promoted to tenured associate professor at the Graduate School of Professional Psychology. Dr. Alexander has since moved to the University of North Carolina at Charlotte, where she serves as an associate professor in the university's Public Health Management and Policy department, and is the Metrolina Medical Foundation Distinguished Scholar. Additionally, she serves as the director of the Violence Prevention Center.

== Research ==
Early in her career Dr. Alexander got involved in the treatment program offered in collaboration between Auburn and the Department of Youth Services to provide education and normative experiences to adolescents who had sexually offended.

=== Trauma and psychological illness ===
Dr. Alexander's early research explored how accumulation of trauma over a lifetime impacts psychological stress scores in victims. Polyvictimization accounted for most of the variability in psychological distress among college females and accounted for significantly more variability than any individual category of victimization on psychological stress. Her findings highlight the severe impact of polyvictimization on mental health and the importance of healthcare professionals looking at cumulative victimizations in the history of their patients as opposed to focusing on single instances when providing diagnoses and care.

Alexander was interested in looking at the rates of post-traumatic stress disorder in individuals diagnosed with severe mental illness to assess this correlation. She found that true rates of PTSD might be underrepresented due to the primary concern being severe mental illness in individuals where trauma might have been the precursor to the mental illness. Her findings suggest the importance of probing the prior traumatic experiences of mentally ill in order to target treatment towards more trauma-centered approaches if necessary.

=== Importance of sex education in preventing sexual assault ===
In 2018, Dr. Alexander gave a TEDx talk in Denver where she discussed her research on the importance of sex education in preventing sexual assault in teens. She recounted that based on her research, one third of sexual offences are committed by individuals under the age of 18. Unfortunately, the label of sex offender remains permanent in the lives of these children as they move into adulthood, even though less than 4% of these individuals never go on to commit another offence. During her time in Alabama, Dr. Alexander found that the majority of adolescents who committed sexual offences were not educated about consent until after they committed sexual offences. Once given the education on why their actions were considered offences, they learned and they understood. After her talk, Dr. Alexander continued on a path towards making her research and advocacy into policy changes. She provided legislative testimony for a bill that would mandate consent education as a component of the sexual education courses in schools, and this bill was passed and made into a law in 2019.

=== Community engagement and advocacy during the COVID-19 crisis ===
Dr. Alexander was involved in science communication and advocacy work during the COVID-19 pandemic. She was featured in Denver's ABC News discussing how the variability of responses and actions taken from state-to-state increased uncertainty and fear in the population. Dr. Alexander was featured on Denver ABC News to discuss her ideas about shifting the language of the COVID-19 pandemic from "social distancing" to "physical distancing" as a means to reduce isolation and improve mental health. She emphasized maintaining physical distance but staying socially connected in as many ways as possible.

Dr. Alexander has been communicating with her community regarding the difference in treatment that certain groups have been receiving throughout the pandemic. She has been particularly concerned with how institutional marginalization has led to exacerbated marginalization during COVID, especially with the homeless, low wage, and racial/ethnic minority populations. She emphasizes documenting as rigorously as possible who is getting tested, treated, dying, and recovering every step of the way to track these disparities and begin to address them as effectively as possible.

== Awards and Honors ==
Year	Award	Awarding Agency
2023	Dalmas A. Taylor Distinguished Contributions Award	American Psychological Association Minority Fellowship Program (MFP)
2023	Evelyn Hooker Award for Distinguished Contribution by an Ally	Society for the Psychology of Sexual Orientation and Gender Diversity (APA Division 44)
2022	Social Justice in Psychology Award	Rocky Mountain Humanistic Counseling and Psychological Association
2021	Marion Langer Award	Global Alliance for Behavioral Health and Social Justice
2021	The Lorraine Williams Greene Award for Social Justice	American Psychological Association (APA Division 18: Psychologists for Public Service)
2020	Emerging Scholar	Diverse: Issues in Higher Education
2019	Early Career Award for Outstanding Contributions to Benefit Children, Youth, and Families	American Psychological Association (APA) Committee on Children, Youth, and Families
2017	Karen Saywitz Early Career Award for Outstanding Contributions to Research	American Psychological Association (APA) Division 37 Section on Child Maltreatment
2017	APA Early Career Achievement Award	American Psychological Association (APA) Committee on Early Career Psychologists
2016	Outstanding Recent Alumna	Virginia Tech Influential Black Alumni Awards, Virginia Tech Alumni Association
2011	Elizabeth B. Wolf Outstanding Clinical Student Award	Florida Institute of Technology, Clinical Psychology
