= John Cosker =

American powerboat engineer

John Martin Cosker is an American designer, engineer of builder and powerboats. He is known for his work in designing and engineering high speed luxury and racing powerboats, with some models reaching speeds of well over 200 miles per hour. He is a pioneer in high performance race boat design and manufacturing methods.

== Early life and education ==
Cosker graduated from Florida Institute of Technology in 1991.

== Career ==
Cosker founded Mystic Powerboats in Melbourne, Florida in 1996. The company now resides in DeLand, Florida and sell boats internationally. His designs include boats with twin turbine engines, each with 2,500 horsepower. In 2006, his team broke the race record at 208 miles per hour on the one mile drag at the 18th annual Lake Rescue Benefit Shootout, considered by Powerboat Magazine as one of the top eight boat events in the world. In 2017, the team won their third race with a speed of 204 miles per hour on a 51-foot Mystic with 9,000 horsepower. A Mystic racing boat has won this race 5 times. In 2012, he sold a $2 million racing boat to the Qatar Marine Sports Federation.

He has also designed boats for Concept Boats.
