= 2016 Louisiana floods =

Natural disaster in Louisiana, United States

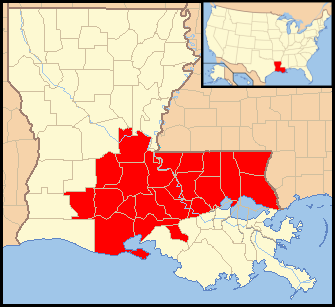
- The 21 Louisiana parishes that were designated as federal disaster areas by FEMA in the aftermath of the floods.
- Date: August 12, 2016–August 22, 2016
- Location: Most of southern Louisiana, United States
- Deaths: 13
- Property damage: $10–15 billion

In August 2016, prolonged rainfall from an unpredictable storm resulted in catastrophic flooding in the state of Louisiana, United States; thousands of houses and businesses were submerged. Louisiana's governor, John Bel Edwards, called the disaster a "historic, unprecedented flooding event" and declared a state of emergency. Many rivers and waterways, particularly the Amite and Comite rivers, reached record levels, and rainfall exceeded 20 inches (510 mm) in multiple parishes.

Because numerous homeowners who were affected were without flood insurance, the federal government provided disaster aid through the Federal Emergency Management Agency (FEMA). The flood was called the worst US natural disaster since Hurricane Sandy in 2012. At least 13 deaths were reported as a result of the flooding.

== Meteorological history ==
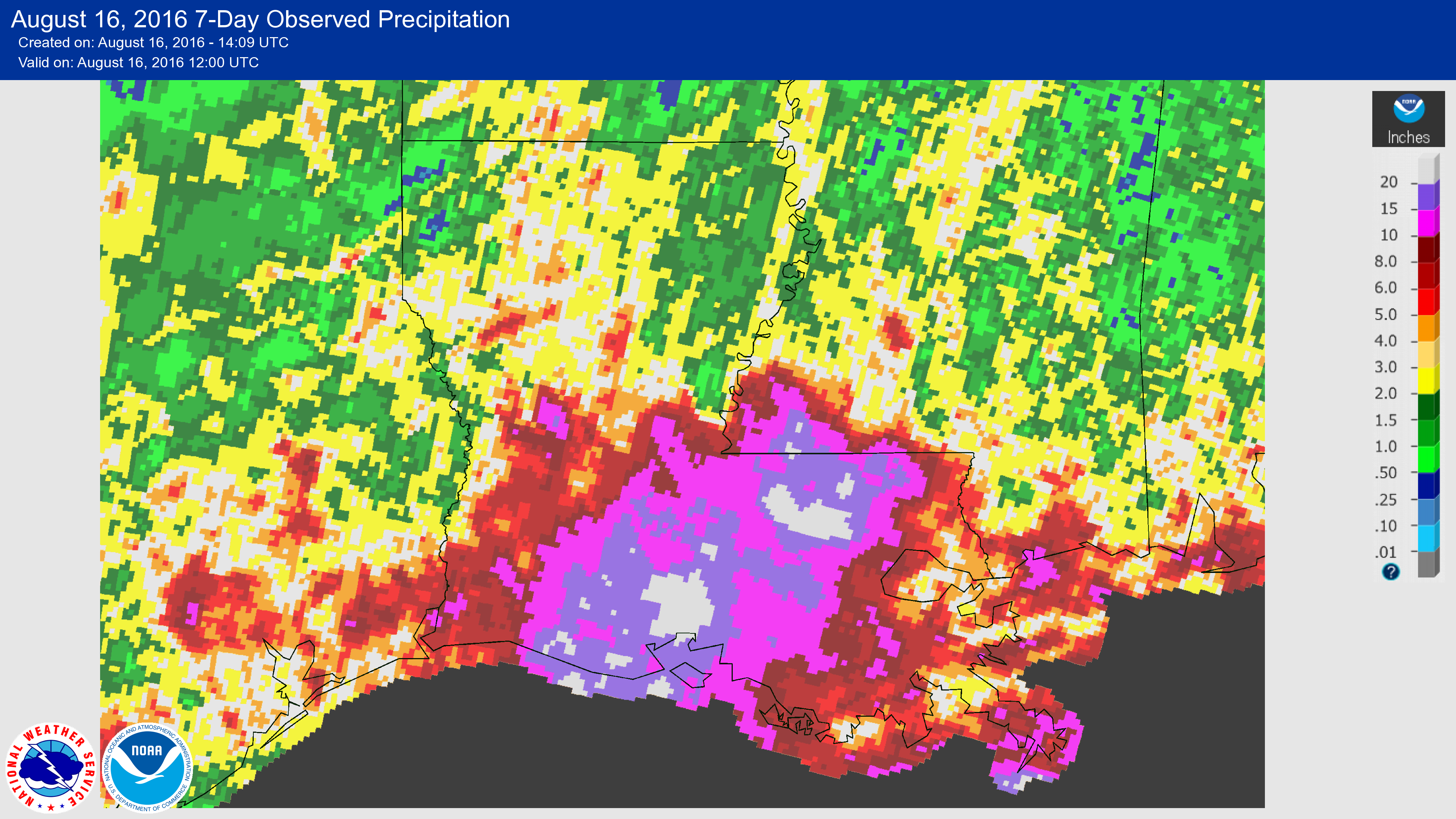
A map of radar-estimated rainfall accumulations across Louisiana between August 9 and 16, 2016; areas shaded in white indicate accumulations in excess of 20 in (510 mm).

Early on August 11, a mesoscale convective system flared up in southern Louisiana around a weak area of low pressure that was situated next to an outflow boundary. It remained nearly stationary, and as a result, torrential downpours occurred in the areas surrounding Baton Rouge and Lafayette. Rainfall rates of up to 2–3 inches (5.1–7.6 cm) an hour were reported in the most deluged areas where totals exceeded nearly 2 feet (61 cm) in some areas as a result of the system remaining stationary. Accumulations peaked at 31.39 inches (797 mm) in Watson, just northeast of Baton Rouge.

The Washington Post noted that the "no-name storm" dumped three times as much rain on Louisiana as Hurricane Katrina. It dropped the equivalent of 7.1 trillion gallons of water or enough to fill Lake Pontchartrain about four times. Hurricane Katrina, by comparison, dumped about 2.3 trillion gallons of rainwater in the state (though more in other states). The flooding rains also dumped more water than had Hurricane Isaac. According to the National Weather Service Hydrometeorological Design Studies Center, the amount of rainfall in the hardest-hit locations had a less than 0.1 percent chance of happening or was a (less than) 1-in-1,000-year event.

Because the rain was not associated with a named storm, there was less warning to the public for emergency preparations.

GPM provides a closer look at the Louisiana floods.

=== Climate change connection ===
A rapid attribution study, published within one month after the event, indicates an anthropogenic climate warming role in the increased probability of the return time of a similar extreme event happening in the future. A follow-on peer-reviewed paper indicates that the catastrophic flood in Louisiana was a result of intense precipitation produced by a slow-moving, tropical, low-pressure system interacting with an eastward-traveling baroclinic trough to the north. While tropical-midlatitude interactions of this nature are rare, they are not unprecedented.

Analyses point towards the tendency for more and perhaps stronger upper-level troughs propagating out of the western U.S. in summer; these have an increasing potential to cross paths with low-pressure systems that form around the Gulf Coast. Combined with the projected increase in precipitable water, resulting precipitation magnitude would increase. Large-ensemble modeling indicates that the prospect of future tropical-midlatitude interactions is a scenario that Louisiana will face in the future. Regional simulations suggest that the climate warming since 1985 may have increased the event precipitation (August 11–14, 2016) on the order of 20%.

Rainfall like this and the emergency help needed after the flooding subsides are straining the federal system for aid to states. Some analysts wonder if this is the new normal for storms and floods.

== Flooding ==
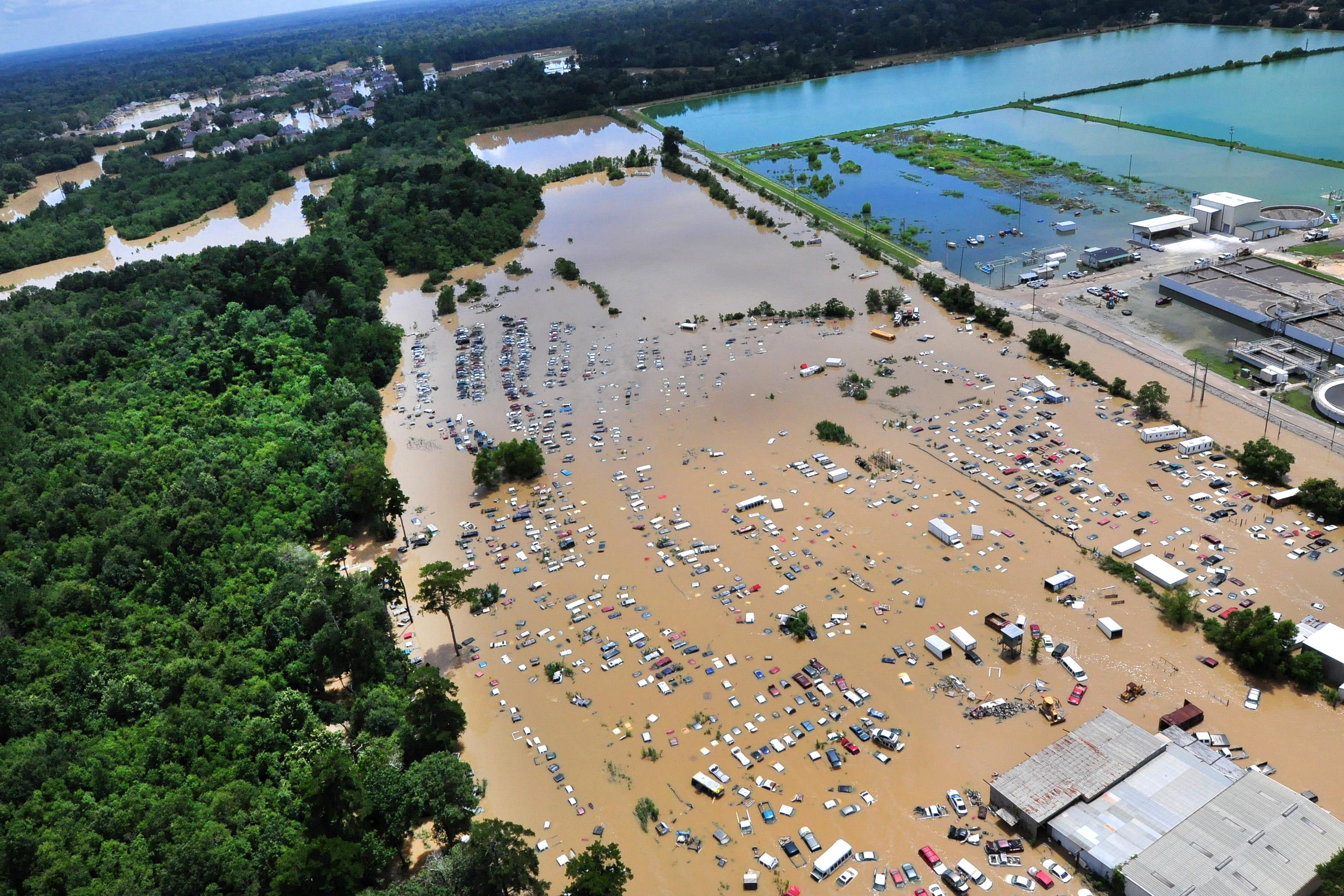
An aerial view of flooding near Baton Rouge

Flooding began in earnest on August 12. On August 13, a flash flood emergency was issued for areas along the Amite and Comite rivers. By August 15, more than ten rivers (Amite, Vermilion, Calcasieu, Comite, Mermentau, Pearl, Tangipahoa, Tchefuncte, Tickfaw, and Bogue Chitto) and many more had reached a moderate, major, or record flood stage. Eight rivers reached record levels, including the Amite and Comite rivers.

The Amite River crested at nearly 5 ft (1.5 m) above the previous record in Denham Springs. Nearly one-third of all homes—approximately 15,000 structures—in Ascension Parish were flooded after a levee along the Amite River was overtopped. Water levels began to slowly recede by August 15, though large swaths of land remained submerged. Livingston Parish was one of the hardest hit areas; an official estimated that 75 percent of the homes in the parish were a "total loss". It was thought over 146,000 homes were damaged in Louisiana. This mass flooding also damaged thousands of businesses.

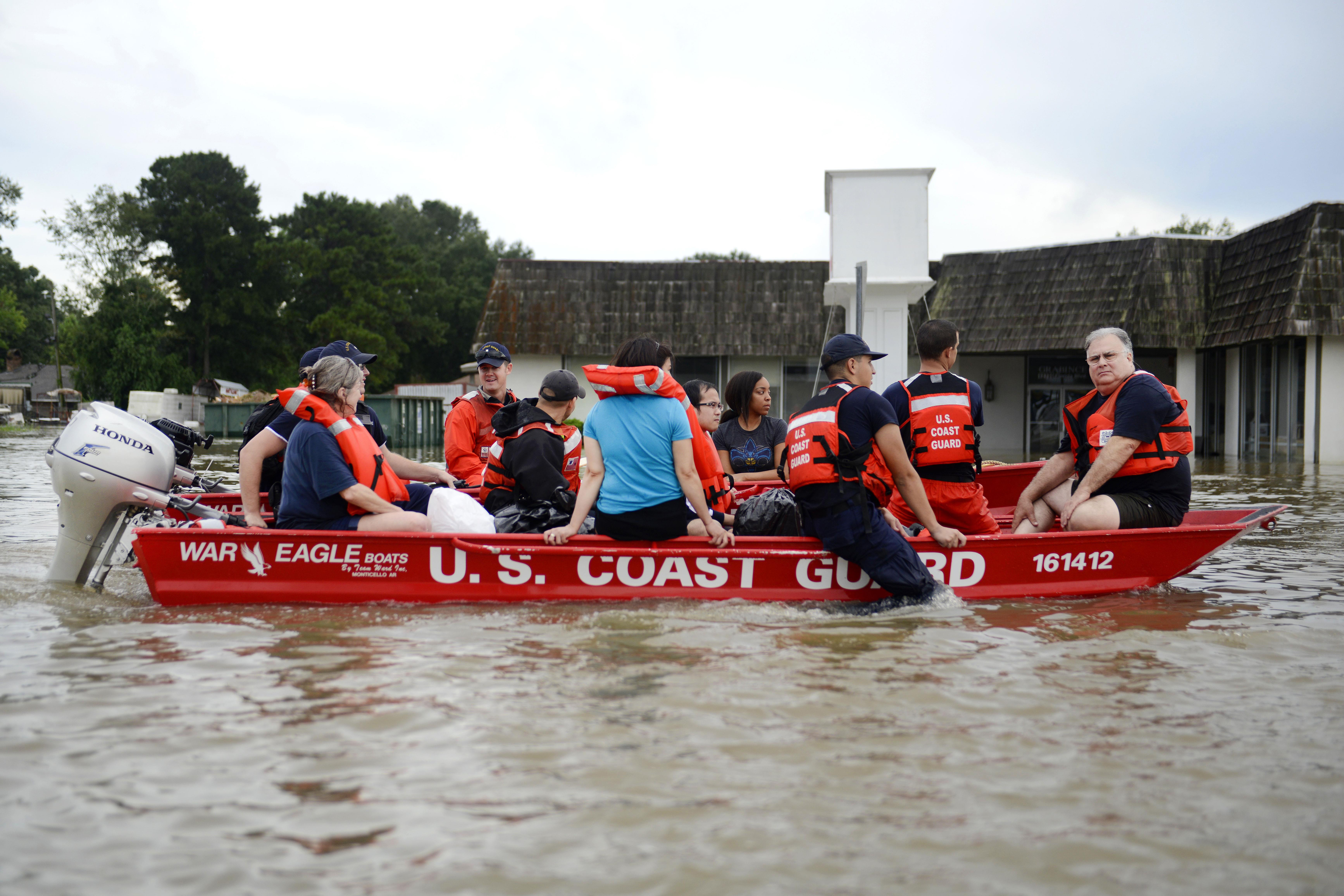
The US Coast Guard rescuing Baton Rouge residents following the floods

Thirteen people have been confirmed dead as a consequence of the flooding. An elderly woman in Livingston Parish was confirmed dead by parish officials. A man's body was found Wednesday on Whitehall Avenue in Denham Springs. Officials said they found a man in his 50s in the South Point subdivision off of Walker South. They added he had no obvious signs of trauma, and the area he was found in had five-feet of water in it at one point. Of the other deaths, five people have died in East Baton Rouge Parish, three in Tangipahoa Parish, two in St. Helena Parish, two in Livingston Parish and one in Rapides Parish from the storms and their aftermath.

=== Evacuations and rescues ===
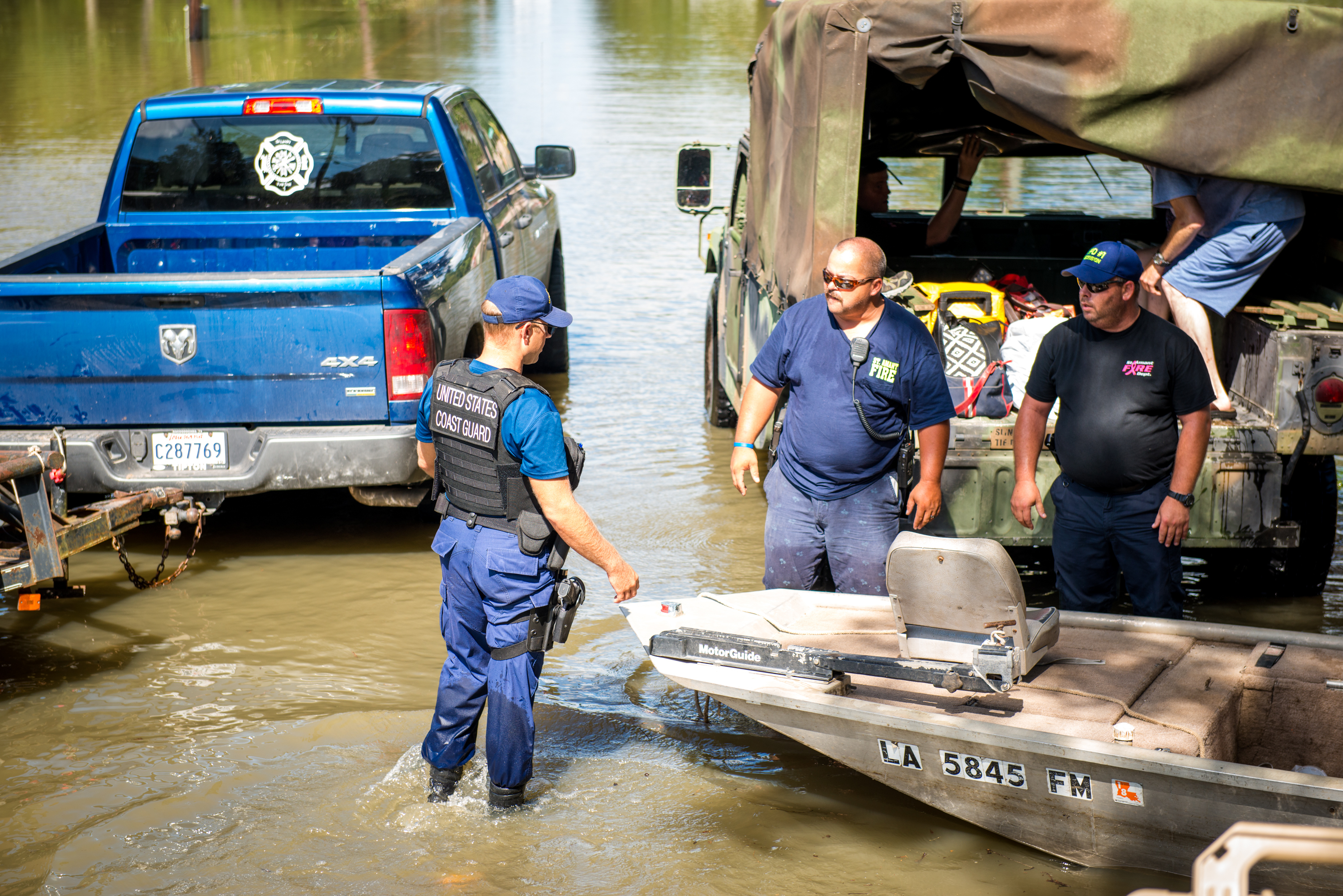
The US Coast Guard coordinating rescue operations with the St. Amant Fire Department in the Baton Rouge area.

The widespread flooding stranded tens of thousands of people in their homes and vehicles. At least 30,000 people were rescued by local law enforcement, firefighters, the Louisiana National Guard, the Coast Guard and fellow residents, from submerged vehicles and flooded homes. Many boat-owning residents of Louisiana and Mississippi, together with other volunteers, formed an informal rescue service known as the Cajun Navy and navigated through flooded areas to answer calls for help that they received via social media. They rescued as many as a thousand people and pets and distributed emergency supplies. A group of 70 volunteers from St. Bernard Parish conducted hundreds of boat rescues in East Baton Rouge Parish. By August 15, approximately 11,000 people sought refuge in 70 shelters. Flash flooding swamped a 7-mile (11 km) section of Interstate 12 between Tangipahoa Parish and Baton Rouge, stranding 125 vehicles. At one point, an approximately 62-mile stretch was closed because of flooding concerns. State police and the National Guard used high-water vehicles to rescue trapped motorists, but many remained stuck for over 24 hours. A cellular network outage complicated rescues over the affected area. On August 12, a state of emergency was activated for the whole of Louisiana.

== Aftermath ==
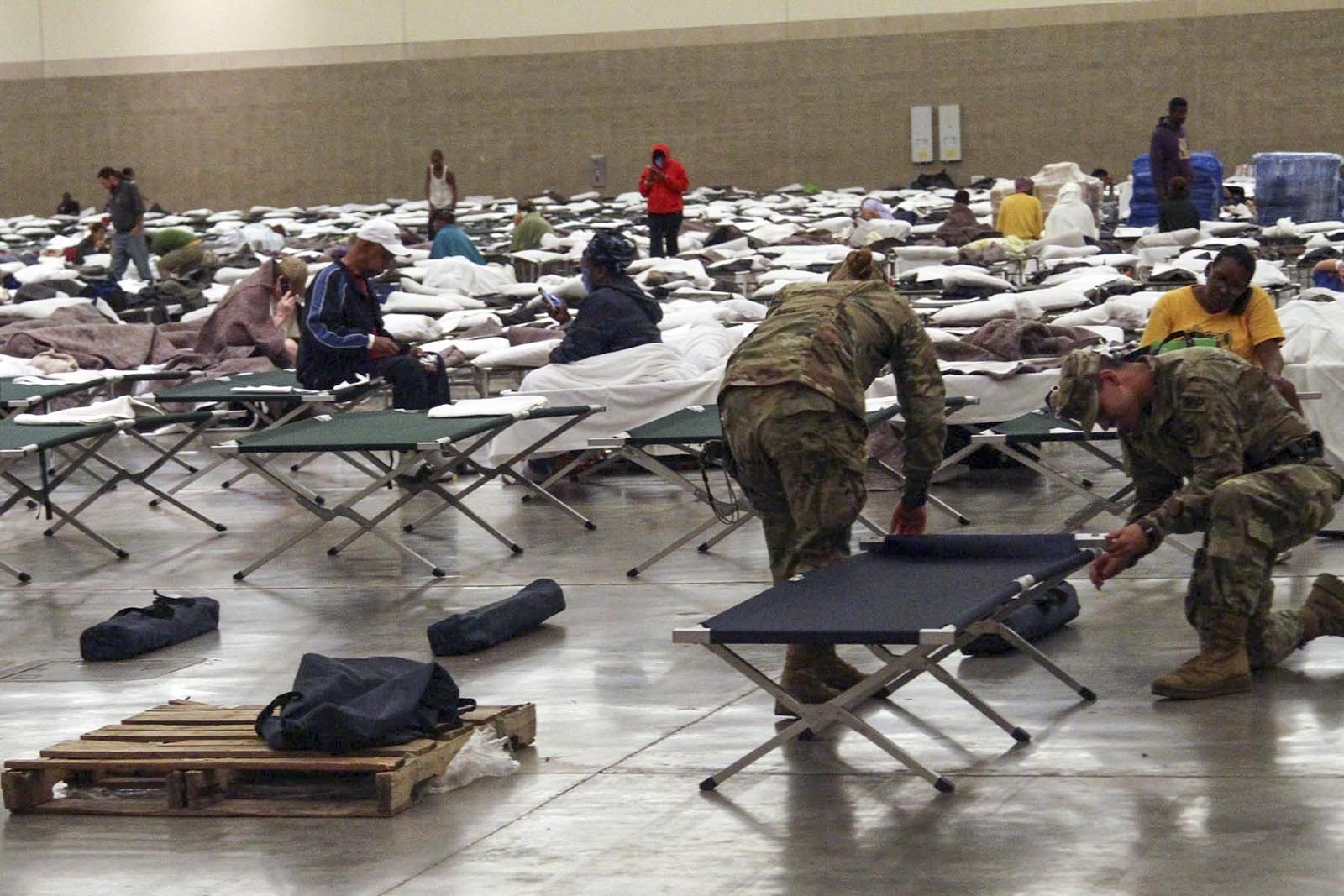
The Baton Rouge River Center served as a shelter for hundreds of displaced flood victims.

With an estimated 146,000 homes damaged in the flooding thousands of Louisianans were forced into shelters, with more than 11,000 in state-operated shelters. This prompted an estimated 1,500 American Red Cross volunteers to travel to Louisiana. Other groups such as Louisiana State University, the Catholic Charities Archdiocese of New Orleans, the Church of Jesus Christ of Latter-day Saints, the Celebration Church, Grace Church of Central, and the Church of Scientology also sent aid. There were media reports of one man who cooked 108 pounds (49 kg) of brisket for displaced people. The Louisiana Society for the Prevention of Cruelty to Animals attempted to rescue stray pets, and the Second Harvest Food Bank and the United Way of Southeast Louisiana sent supplies and food. More than 109,398 individuals and households registered for FEMA assistance, and FEMA approved $132 million for assistance. Singer Beyoncé, along with sister Solange and Kelly Rowland, held an event that raised more $4 million for those affected by the floods in Baton Rouge. In addition, singer Taylor Swift donated $1 million to Louisiana's relief fund. Lady Gaga donated an unspecified amount of money. On August 13, the International Charter on Space and Major Disasters was activated by the USGS, allowing for the humanitarian redeployment of satellite assets by the international community. AT&T donated $100,000 to be split between the Baton Rouge Area Foundation and DonorsChoose.org for flood relief. Randy Jackson and Harry Connick Jr. were scheduled to host a benefit concert at the Baton Rouge River Center Theatre on September 5, featuring over a dozen artists, and all proceeds went to the American Red Cross Louisiana Flood Relief fund. On the "Ellen" show Friday, September 9, host Ellen DeGeneres announced that she and Britney Spears would each donate $125,000 to help victims of the Louisiana Flood of 2016. Both celebrities are from Louisiana. Spears gave $125,000 to the Louisiana Red Cross to buy a new emergency response vehicle. DeGeneres received a letter from Betsey Baldwin, a P.E. teacher at Galvez Middle School in Ascension parish, which was inundated with two feet of water. The school has 620 students, who after the floods have been forced to study at another, nearby school. "I thought of one person that would help me, and it was you," Baldwin said. The company Shutterfly, at the request of DeGeneres, donated $125,000 to help Galvez Middle School recover.

=== Impact on school system ===
During the peak of the floods, around 265,000 children have been out of school, nearly 30% of the school-aged population in the state of Louisiana. There were reports that 6 schools were heavily flooded in East Baton Rouge Parish with another 15 in Livingston Parish.

Livingston Parish's Superintendent, Rick Wentzel, believes that their school system is in a similar position to the Northshore following Hurricane Katrina in 2005, and he held a meeting with the school district to discuss possible options. Livingston Parish conducted a teacher survey August 23–24, and a parent survey August 25 to assess how those are affected, and on Friday, August 26, 2016, Wentzel announced that Livingston Parish Public Schools will be resuming class on September 12, 2016. Wentzel, who was affected by the flooding himself, said he was "very pleased" that all schools will be resuming together. The late restart date is because LPPS received the most extensive damage with eight of the 15 flooded schools having "extensive damage." Wentzel said that each school will have a welcome back event for parents and students before returning on September 12, 27 school days following the August 4 start date. Wentzel said that the restart will have some unfortunate "side effects" as some schools will be temporarily platooned. The platooned schools were Denham Springs High School at Live Oak High School, Denham Springs Freshman High at Live Oak Middle School, Southside Junior High at Juban Parc High School, and Springfield High School at Springfield Middle School. All host schools were in session from 6:30 am until 11:40 am and all platooned schools were in session from 12:25 pm until 5:37 pm. The two elementary schools were in class alongside their relocated school. Denham Springs Elementary was split among Eastside Elementary (Grades: PreK, K, 1, 2) and Freshwater Elementary (Grades: 3, 4, 5) while Southside Elementary was split among Lewis Vincent Elementary (Grades: PreK, K, 1) and Juban Parc Elementary (Grades: 2, 3, 4, 5). This announcement also came with Superintendent Wentzel saying ALL students will receive free lunch until September 30. Following a school board meeting on Thursday, September 9, Assistant Superintendent Stephen Parill announced the "known and confident updates" for the 2016 Academic Calendar. Only four changes were made to the calendar that include: changing Thursday, September 15 from a half-day to a whole day, removing the parish fair holiday on Friday, October 7 (the fair was cancelled due to the flooding), removing a parent-teacher conference day on Thursday, October 20, and making Wednesday, November 16 a whole day instead of a half-day. The board also voted to add class time to the day. Parill said they are still waiting on their appeal to Louisiana Board of Elementary and Secondary Education (BESE) waiving the required minutes of class, and any further changes will be made after BESE's ruling.

For the entire state, superintendent John White said that at least 22 schools had heavy damage and will need time to recover. There were also many school closures due to flooding in the Lafayette area as well.

Many teachers' homes flooded, with 4,000 staff members' homes in Baker sustaining damage and another 2,000 in East Baton Rouge Parish. East Baton Rouge Parish schools announced they won't open back up until September 6, 25 days after school was originally canceled for the floods on August 12, the third day of school.

Transportation was a challenge for many districts across the state, as many kids were displaced from their homes and many school buses were damaged from flood water.

=== Prison system ===
The Louisiana Correctional Institute for Women (LCIW), located in St. Gabriel and the sole Louisiana state prison for women, had 985 prisoners at the time of the flooding. The prison experienced flooding ranging from 8 inches (200 mm) to 3 feet (0.91 m). LCIW, the only state-operated prison to receive flooding during the incident, temporarily closed. It was the first time in state history that the whole population of a particular prison was evacuated to other facilities. As of 2017 the prisoners were still housed in other prisons. Elayn Hunt Correctional Center, next to LCIW, was not evacuated.

=== Economic impact ===
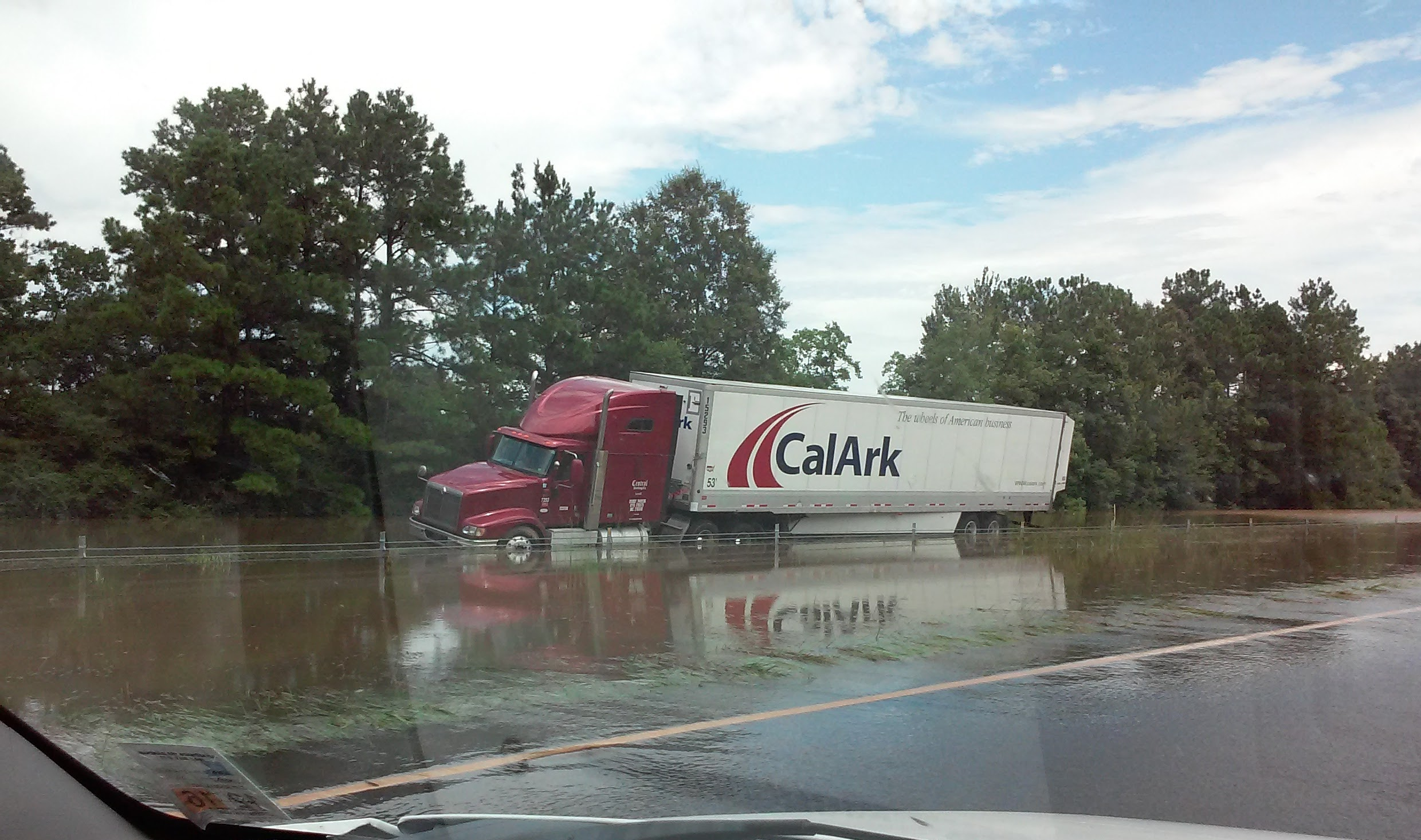
An 18-wheeler abandoned on Interstate 12 during the 2016 Louisiana floods

Damages were anticipated to reach $10–15 billion, with this storm likely ranking as the seventh most expensive of natural disasters in the US since 1978.

Because many of the areas that flooded were not in "high flood risk areas," the majority of homeowners affected by the flood did not have flood insurance. Across Louisiana, about 21% of all structures have coverage under the National Flood Insurance Program. Despite this, in many parishes that percentage is much lower. In St. Helena Parish, which was among the hardest hit parishes by the floods, less than 1% of all homeowners had flood insurance.

Because of the large number of homeowners without flood insurance that were affected, the federal government is providing disaster aid through the Federal Emergency Management Agency (FEMA). The flood has been called the worst US natural disaster since Hurricane Sandy in 2012.

FEMA, which has stepped in to help homeowners without flood insurance, has declared these 20 parishes as federal disaster areas: Acadia, Ascension, Avoyelles, East Baton Rouge, East Feliciana, Evangeline, Iberia, Iberville, Jefferson Davis, Lafayette, Livingston, Pointe Coupee, St. Helena, St. Landry, St. Martin, St. Tammany, Tangipahoa, Vermilion, Washington, and West Feliciana. Homeowners with damage from the floods in those parishes are eligible for up to $33,000 in federal disaster aid and so far around 102,000 people have applied for help. For business continuity and community rebuilding, private mobile flood recovery centers have also been made available, including a 10-piece modular building complex used in Baton Rouge by FEMA as a portable school for children of displaced families who moved north from New Orleans after Hurricane Katrina.
