= Bogue Chitto =

Bogue Chitto may refer to:

- Bogue Chitto, Alabama, an unincorporated community in Dallas County, Alabama
- Bogue Chitto, Lincoln County, Mississippi, an unincorporated community in Lincoln County, Mississippi
- Bogue Chitto, Mississippi, a census-designated place (CDP) in Neshoba and Kemper counties, Mississippi
- Bogue Chitto National Wildlife Refuge, in Louisiana and Mississippi
- Bogue Chitto River, in Louisiana and Mississippi
- Bogue Chitto State Park, in Washington Parish, Louisiana
