= Angie, Louisiana =

- Village
- Location of Angie in Washington Parish, Louisiana.

- Location of Louisiana in the United States
- Coordinates: 30°57′52″N 89°48′49″W
- Country: United States
- State: Louisiana
- Parish: Washington
- Incorporated: 1908

Government
  - Mayor: John Dawsey

Area
  - Total: 1.54 sq mi (3.98 km^{2})
  - Land: 1.53 sq mi (3.97 km^{2})
  - Water: 0.0077 sq mi (0.02 km^{2})
- Elevation: 141 ft (43 m)

Population (2020)
  - Total: 258
  - Density: 168.5/sq mi (65.04/km^{2})
- Time zone: UTC-6 (CST)
  - Summer (DST): UTC-5 (CDT)
- Area code: 985
- FIPS code: 22-02165
- Website: thevillageofangie.org

Angie is a village in Washington Parish, Louisiana, United States. As of the 2020 census, Angie had a population of 258. It is part of the Bogalusa Micropolitan Statistical Area.

== History ==
Angie was named for Angeline Bateman McMillan, an elderly member of the family who were the original owners of the town site.

== Geography ==
Angie is located at 30°57′52″N 89°48′49″W (30.964480, -89.813748).

According to the United States Census Bureau, the village has a total area of 1.5 square miles (3.9 km^{2}), of which 1.5 square miles (3.9 km^{2}) is land and 0.65% is water.

== Demographics ==
Historical population
Census	Pop.	Note	%±
1910	346		—
1920	230		−33.5%
1930	207		−10.0%
1940	187		−9.7%
1950	230		23.0%
1960	254		10.4%
1970	317		24.8%
1980	311		−1.9%
1990	235		−24.4%
2000	240		2.1%
2010	251		4.6%
2020	258		2.8%
2025 (est.)	246	▼	−4.7%
U.S. Decennial Census

As of the census of 2000, there were 240 people, 97 households, and 70 families residing in the village. The population density was 157.5 inhabitants per square mile (60.8/km^{2}). There were 114 housing units at an average density of 74.8 per square mile (28.9/km^{2}). The racial makeup of the village was 81.67% White, 17.50% African American, 0.42% Native American, and 0.42% from two or more races. Hispanic or Latino of any race were 3.33% of the population.

There were 97 households, out of which 33.0% had children under the age of 18 living with them, 55.7% were married couples living together, 12.4% had a female householder with no husband present, and 27.8% were non-families. 24.7% of all households were made up of individuals, and 12.4% had someone living alone who was 65 years of age or older. The average household size was 2.47 and the average family size was 2.93.

In the village, the population was spread out, with 25.4% under the age of 18, 8.3% from 18 to 24, 25.0% from 25 to 44, 25.4% from 45 to 64, and 15.8% who were 65 years of age or older. The median age was 38 years. For every 100 females, there were 79.1 males. For every 100 females age 18 and over, there were 79.0 males.

The median income for a household in the village was $27,344, and the median income for a family was $33,000. Males had a median income of $34,375 versus $26,071 for females. The per capita income for the village was $14,198. About 15.2% of families and 24.7% of the population were below the poverty line, including 27.4% of those under the age of eighteen and 30.2% of those 65 or over.

== Notable people ==
Angie was the residence of former Louisiana State Representative Lawrence A. "Buster" Sheridan (1919–2001). Sheridan was defeated in the 1987 nonpartisan blanket primary by Jerry A. Thomas, a physician in Franklinton.

== Corrections ==
Louisiana Department of Public Safety and Corrections operates the B.B. "Sixty" Rayburn Correctional Center in an unincorporated section of Washington Parish, near Angie.
