= Twiley Barker =

American political scientist

Twiley W. Barker
- Born: January 29, 1926; Franklinton, Louisiana
- Died: July 13, 2009 (Aged 83); Chicago, Illinois
- Education: Tuskegee University; Southern University; University of Illinois at Urbana Champaign
- Scientific career
- Fields: Political science
- Workplaces: Southern Illinois University; University of Illinois at Chicago

Twiley W. Barker, Jr. (January 29, 1926 – July 13, 2009) was an American political scientist and scholar of constitutional law. He was a founding faculty member of the department of political science at the University of Illinois at Chicago, where he worked from 1962 to 1994.

== Life and career ==
Barker was born on January 29, 1926, and he grew up in Franklinton, Louisiana. The political scientist Lucius Barker was Twiley Barker's brother. He attended Tuskegee University as an undergraduate, but he joined the Air Force during his studies, and after his service he completed his bachelor's degree at Southern University. He attended Southern at the same time as his brother Lucius Barker, and the two were persuaded to study politics rather than medicine after taking classes with the political scientist Rodney Higgins. He then obtained his PhD from the University of Illinois at Urbana Champaign in 1955. From 1955 to 1960, he taught at Southern Illinois University, and in 1960 he married Ruth Jamason Barker. In 1962, Barker moved to the University of Illinois at Chicago, where he worked until his retirement in 1994. In addition to being a founding member of that department, Barker was undergraduate director for two decades, and helped set up the pre-law program there.

Barker's scholarship focused on constitutional law and judicial politics in the United States. For example, he wrote a comparative analysis on the first terms of Clarence Thomas and Thurgood Marshall. In 1970, he and his brother Lucius Barker coauthored the textbook Civil Liberties and the Constitution. This textbook had been published in 9 editions by 2020, and is considered a classic textbook on the structure of the American legal system.

Barker was particularly noted as an instructor and a mentor, and his students included Carol Moseley Braun and Tony Podesta. In 1966 Barker won his university's highest teaching award, the UIC Silver Circle Award. He also won the 1969 E. Harris Harbison Prize from the Danforth Foundation for "unusual accomplishments in college teaching".

In addition to his academic work, Barker was also involved in local activism; for example, he worked against inequitable gentrification of his Chicago neighborhood, Groveland Park. He had two children. He died on July 13, 2009, having remained Professor Emeritus of Political Science at University of Illinois at Chicago.

== Selected works ==
- Civil Liberties and the Constitution, with Lucius Barker (1970)

== Selected awards ==
- UIC Silver Circle Award (1966)
- E. Harris Harbison Prize, Danforth Foundation (1969)
