= Pine Junior/Senior High School =

Location
- 1 Raider Drive; Franklinton, (Washington Parish), Louisiana 70438; United States; 30.9250°N 90.0151°W

Information
- Type: Public high school
- School district: Washington Parish School Board
- Principal: Ramona Thomas
- Staff: 47.16 (FTE)
- Enrollment: 738 (2024-2025)
- Student to teacher ratio: 15.65
- Colors: Red and blue
- Mascot: Raiders
- Website: sites.google.com/wpsb.info/phs/home

Pine Junior/Senior High School is located near Franklinton, Louisiana, United States, and is a part of the Washington Parish School Board. Its current principal is Ramona Thomas.

The school mascot is the Raider.

== History ==
The school was damaged during Hurricane Katrina and re-opened in 2006 at a new site about a mile away from the old one.

The school's newly built football stadium was completed in 2010.

== Athletics ==
Pine Senior High athletics competes in the LHSAA.

== Notable alumni ==
- Derrick Dillon, professional football player for the New York Giants and college football player for LSU Tigers
