= WCI =

WCI may refer to:

== Companies ==
- WCI Communities, a subsidiary of the home construction company Lennar Corporation
- Western Climate Initiative, a non-profit corporation that administers emissions trading markets in North America
- White Sewing Machine Company, an appliance company at one time known as White Consolidated Industries

== Schools ==
- Walkerville Collegiate Institute, a secondary school located in the Walkerville area of Windsor, Ontario
- Walnut Creek Intermediate, a middle school in Walnut Creek, California
- Waterloo Collegiate Institute, a secondary school in Waterloo, Ontario
- Western Culinary Institute, former name of Le Cordon Bleu College of Culinary Arts in Portland, Oregon
- Westmount Collegiate Institute, a secondary school in Thornhill, Ontario
- Woburn Collegiate Institute, a secondary school in Toronto, Ontario
- Woodstock Collegiate Institute, a secondary school in Woodstock, Ontario

== Other uses ==
- Waci language, by ISO 639-3 code
- Warren Correctional Institution, a prison in Ohio
- Washington Correctional Institute, former name of the B.B. Rayburn Correctional Center in Washington Parish, Louisiana
- WikiConference India, a national Wikipedia conference organised in India
