= Sixty Rayburn =

American politician (1916–2008)

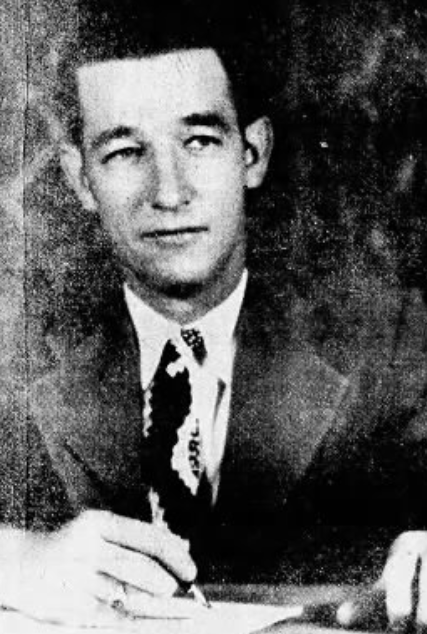
- Rayburn in 1951

Member of the Louisiana House of Representatives
- In office 1948–1951
- Preceded by: Murphy R. Williams
- Succeeded by: N. L. Smith

Member of the Louisiana State Senate from the 12th district
- In office 1951–1996
- Preceded by: H. H. Richardson
- Succeeded by: Phil Short

Personal details
- Born: Benjamin Burras Rayburn; August 11, 1916 Sumrall, Mississippi, U.S.
- Died: March 5, 2008 (aged 91) Covington, Louisiana, U.S.
- Party: Democratic

Benjamin Burras Rayburn (August 11, 1916 – March 5, 2008) was an American politician. A member of the Democratic Party, he served in the Louisiana House of Representatives from 1948 to 1951 and in the Louisiana State Senate from 1951 to 1996.

== Life and career ==
Rayburn was born in Sumrall, Mississippi, the son of Thomas Rayborn and Grace Rawls. He served as a member of the Washington Parish Police Jury from 1944 to 1948, at the time being the youngest member of a police jury in Louisiana.

Rayburn served in the Louisiana House of Representatives from 1948 to 1951. After his service in the House, he then served in the Louisiana State Senate from 1951 to 1996. During his service in the Senate, in 1993, he was inducted into the Louisiana Political Museum and Hall of Fame.

In 2006, the Louisiana Department of Public Safety & Corrections renamed the Washington Correctional Institute as the B.B. Rayburn Correctional Center.

== Death ==
Rayburn died on March 5, 2008, from complications of lung cancer, at the St. Tammany Hospital in Covington, Louisiana, at the age of 91.
