= Louisiana Senate Bill 44 =

2022 law in U.S. state

Senate Bill 44

Louisiana Legislature
- Long title: AN ACT To enact Chapter 7-A of Title 4 of the Louisiana Revised Statutes of 1950, to be comprised of R.S. 4:441 through 446, relative to athletic activities; to require that schools designate intercollegiate and interscholastic athletic teams according to the biological sex of the team members; to provide that the teams designated for females are not open to participation by biological males; to provide immunity protections for schools from certain adverse actions; to provide for causes of action; to provide for legislative findings; to provide for definitions; to provide for remedies; and to provide for related matters.
- Territorial extent: Louisiana
- Enacted by: Louisiana Senate
- Enacted: April 19, 2022
- Enacted by: Louisiana House of Representatives
- Enacted: May 17, 2022
- Became law by inaction: June 6, 2022
- Effective: August 1, 2022

Legislative history

Initiating chamber: Louisiana Senate
- Introduced by: Beth Mizell
- Introduced: February 18, 2022
- First reading: February 18, 2022
- Second reading: March 14, 2022
- Third reading: April 19, 2022
- Voting summary: 29 voted for; 6 voted against

Revising chamber: Louisiana House of Representatives
- Received from the Louisiana Senate: April 19, 2022
- First reading: April 19, 2022
- Second reading: May 9, 2022
- Third reading: May 17, 2022
- Voting summary: 72 voted for; 21 voted against

Final stages
- Finally passed both chambers: May 24, 2022

Summary
- Prohibits anybody assigned male at birth from competing in women's sports in Louisiana at the K-12 and collegiate level.
- Status: In force

Louisiana Senate Bill 44 (SB 44), also known as the Fairness in Women's Sports Act, is a 2022 law in the state of Louisiana that prohibits transgender women from competing in women's sports by determining eligibility based on the sexes, not gender. It became law on August 1, 2022, due to Governor John Bel Edwards refusing to sign nor veto it. A similar bill had been proposed in 2021, but did not pass.

== Provisions ==
Senate Bill 44 prohibits anybody assigned male at birth from competing in women's sports. It is determined via a person's birth certificate, and those who have their birth certificate modified to align with their gender identity are still considered ineligible. The bill explicitly targets transgender women by prohibiting "biological males" from competing in teams designated for women. It applies to K-12 schools and higher education, such as colleges.

== Reactions ==
=== Support ===
The primary sponsor of the bill, Beth Mizell, said that it was to protect cisgender women and keep the playing field fair.

=== Opposition ===
Governor Edwards opposed the bill, but did not veto it. He later stated that it was due to the bill having too much support, which meant his veto would be easily overridden in both the House and the Senate. California Attorney General Rob Bonta announced restrictions on state-funded travel to Louisiana shortly following its passage. Lieutenant Governor Billy Nungesser critiqued the bill by saying it could deter sporting events from coming to Louisiana, such as NCAA championships. Athlete Ally, an advocacy group for LGBTQ+ athletes, opposed the bill.

== See also ==
- LGBTQ rights in Louisiana
- Transgender people in sports
