= Denham Springs High School =

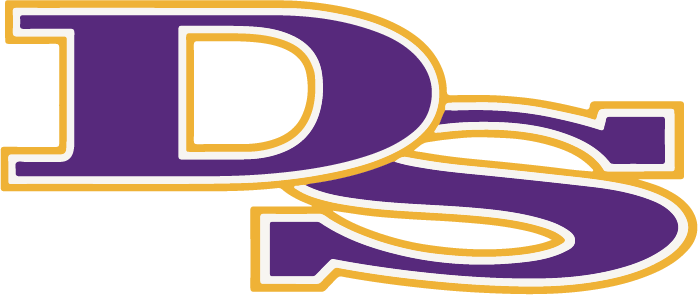

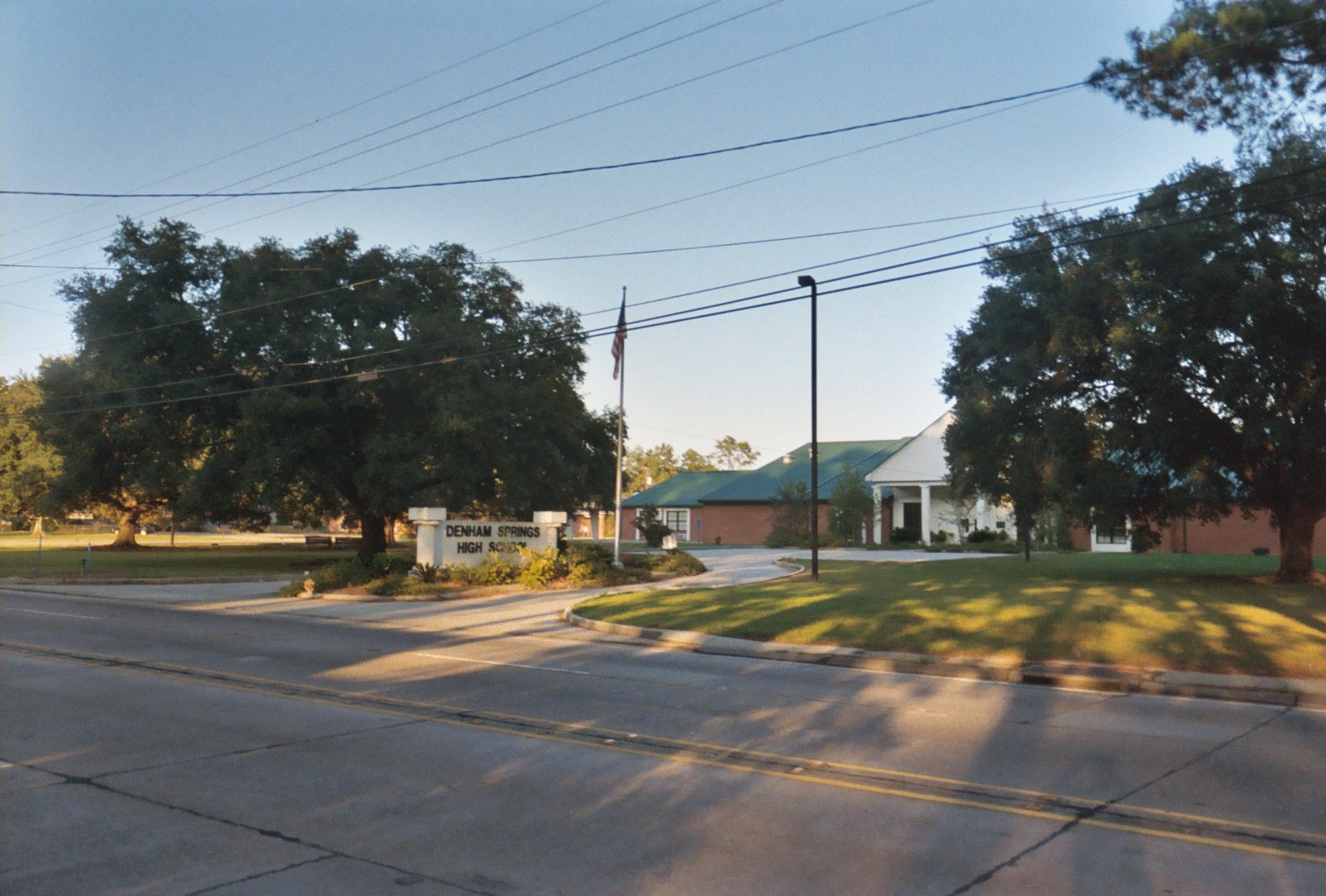

Location
- 1000 N Range Ave; Denham Springs, Louisiana 70726; United States; 30°29′47″N 90°57′22″W

Information
- Type: Public
- Established: 1897; 129 years ago
- School district: Livingston Parish Public Schools
- NCES District ID: 2201020
- CEEB code: 190655
- NCES School ID: 220102000758
- Principal: Wesley Howard
- Teaching staff: 105.26 (on an FTE basis)
- Grades: 9–12
- Enrollment: 1,757 (2023-2024)
- Student to teacher ratio: 16.69
- Campuses: Denham Springs High School STEM Center
- Campus type: suburban
- Colors: Purple and gold
- Slogan: It's a great day to be a yellow jacket!
- Mascot: Butch the Yellow Jacket
- Nickname: Yellow Jackets
- Yearbook: The Yellow Jacket
- Feeder schools: Denham Springs Junior High, Southside Junior High, Juban Parc Junior High
- Website: www.denhamspringshs.org

Denham Springs High School is a public high school located in Denham Springs, Louisiana, United States. Denham Springs High School is a part of the Livingston Parish School System and was founded in 1897 as a school for the residents of Denham Springs, a city located in Livingston Parish. The school is located on Louisiana Highway 16, adjacent to Denham Springs Freshman High. The school's location makes it prone to flooding. This was the case when flooding devastated the area in 2016, and resulted in students having to travel to nearby Live Oak High School for classes.

Denham Springs High School is a public high school and has open enrollment. The school also consistently ranks high on reports by the Louisiana Department of Education. In the 2019 U.S. News & World Report rankings, Denham Springs High School ranked 43 on the "Louisiana's Best High Schools" list.

Denham Springs High School is a member of the Louisiana High School Athletic Association and offers a wide variety of sports and programs. Extracurricular activities are also offered in the form of performing arts, school publications, and clubs.

== History ==
Denham Springs High School was founded in 1897 for the residents of Denham Springs. The school was built to serve the larger city of Denham Springs so that students would not have to travel as far to attend the Live Oak school that was built two years earlier in 1895.

Livingston Parish Public Schools desegregated following the 1969 case Dunn v. Livingston Parish Board. The effects of desegregation were largely felt by those at the once all-white Denham Springs High School. The West Livingston School, the only school in the Parish to serve African Americans, saw a large percentage of its students attend Denham Springs High School after desegregation. African American students were harassed by their white students while teachers looked on indifferently. To make matters worse, West Livingston High School was the heart of the African American community in Denham Springs at the time, and after integration, the school system let the school fall into disrepair.

As the City of Denham Springs continued to grow in the later half of the 20th century, officials at Denham Springs High School looked for ways to continue housing students. On May 8, 1997, a student caused a fire that destroyed the administrative building and damaged others, leading to many classrooms continuing in temporary buildings. By 1998, most of the damage was repaired and a new office building was constructed facing the front of the school in 1999. One of the first measures to ease student flow and improve student success was the addition of Denham Springs Freshman High School in 1998 as a separate school; having previously been managed as one school. The school has since grown to become the second largest high school in the state of Louisiana.

The Great Flood of 2016 devastated the Denham Springs community. Denham Springs High School was one of the three schools that received substantial damage from the flood. As a result of the damages, Denham Springs High School was not able to return to class at their normal campus when classes resumed a month after the flooding event, so students had to travel to Live Oak High School where they attended classes in the afternoon, 40 minutes after the students of Live Oak had their classes. Although the school received substantial damage, it was not declared a total loss by the Federal Emergency Management Agency. As a result, the school system was only able to repair the damages while also making minor improvements. There was no work done to prevent future damages from flooding, so the school continued to see issues in 2017 after a heavy rain event.

== Enrollment ==
Denham Springs High School is a public high school with no admissions requirements. Enrollment is open to residents that make up the Denham Springs and Juban communities. Denham Springs High School had 1,757 students for the 2025-2026 school year, making it the second largest in Livingston Parish behind Walker High School which had 2,134 students for the 2025-2026 school year. The demographics were 1,080 (61.5%) Caucasian, 314 (17.0%) African American, 300 (17.1%) Hispanic, 24 (1.4%) Asian, 17 (0.1%) American Indian/Alaska Native, 35 (2.0%) Two or More Races. The school also has a 51:49 male to female ratio.

== Academics ==
Denham Springs High School features a technical-education curriculum and a college-preparatory curriculum with the option to partake in Advanced Placement (AP) courses. Students in the technical-education curriculum are required to complete a minimum of 23 academic units that include 4 in English, 4 in mathematics, 2 in science, 2 in social science, 1.5 in physical education, .5 in health, and 9 in their technical pathway. Students in the college-preparatory curriculum are required to complete a minimum of 24 academic units that include 4 in English, 2 in foreign language, 4 in mathematics, 4 in science, 4 in social science, 3 in electives, 1.5 in physical education, .5 in health, and 1 in the arts.

The technical-education pathway requires students to travel to the Livingston Parish Literacy and Technical Center in Walker, Louisiana, and is shared by all of the high schools in Livingston Parish. As of 2019, Denham Springs High School offers 20 AP courses for students to earn college credit. Included in the 20 AP courses is AP Seminar the first course in the AP Capstone Program. Spanish and Latin are offered to fulfill the foreign language requirement. Students may also enroll concurrently at Southeastern Louisiana University.

For the 2017–2018 school year, Denham Springs High School earned an A grade under the Louisiana Department of Education more rigorous grading system with a School Performance Score (SPS) of 94.5. The school has a mean ACT score of 21.5. Furthermore, the school has an 87% graduation rate and 59% of its graduates go on to enroll in college.

== Extracurricular activities ==
=== Performing arts ===
The Denham Springs High School Wind Ensemble performed at Carnegie Hall in February 2018.

== Athletics ==
Denham Springs High athletics competes in the LHSAA.

=== Championships ===
Denham Springs High Lady Jackets' bowling team were crowned state champions for four consecutive years.

The softball team has also won four state championships, finishing as the Louisiana 5A State runner up in 2014.

=== Football ===
In 1965, Louis “Loodie” Carlisle started a 10-year-run of success, including an undefeated season in 1968 and the state runner up year in 1972.

Harold "Butch" Wax took over the helm in 1975 and was the face of Yellow Jacket football for the next 22 years. Playoffs became a regular expectation around Denham Springs, which produced a 10–0 regular season in 1978 and a high school All-American in running back Kelvin Robinson, who went on to play at Tulane and entered the school Hall of Fame in its first year along with his head coach.

Between 1983 and 1985, the team compiled a 32–5 overall record. The 1986 senior class particular produced three football members for the school's Hall of Fame, among them Glenn Glass, who set a career rushing mark of over 4,000 yards, star defensive back Michael Sceroler, and Ben McDonald, a punter in football who became a baseball star at LSU, Olympic Gold Medalist and the number one Major League Baseball draft pick as a right-handed pitcher with the Baltimore Orioles.

== Notable alumni ==
- Cade Doughty, MLB player (Toronto Blue Jays)
- Russ Johnson, former MLB player (Houston Astros, Tampa Bay Rays, New York Yankees)
- Eddie Jones, former NFL executive (New Orleans Saints and Miami Dolphins)
- Ben McDonald, former MLB player (Baltimore Orioles, Milwaukee Brewers)
- Buddy Mincey Jr., member of the Louisiana House of Representatives
- Tasmin Mitchell, basketball coach and former professional player
- Mac Sceroler, former MLB player (Baltimore Orioles, Cincinnati Reds)
- Dashawn Spears (McBryde), college football safety for the LSU Tigers
- Travis Swaggerty, baseball player (Pittsburgh Pirates, Kansas City Monarchs)
