= Lucius Barker =

American political scientist (1928–2020)

- Born: Lucius Jefferson Barker; June 11, 1928; Franklinton, Louisiana, U.S.
- Died: June 21, 2020 (aged 92); Menlo Park, California, U.S.
- Education: Southern University; University of Illinois at Urbana Champaign
- Spouse: Maude Beavers (m. 1965; died 2020)
- Children: 2
- Scientific career
- Fields: Political science; Constitutional law
- Workplaces: Southern University; University of Illinois; University of Wisconsin–Milwaukee; Washington University in St. Louis; Stanford University
- Thesis: Offshore oil politics: A study in public policy making (1954)
- Doctoral advisor: Jack Peltason

Lucius Jefferson Barker (June 11, 1928 – June 21, 2020) was an American political scientist. He was the Edna Fischel Gellhorn Professor and chair of the political science department at Washington University in St. Louis, and then the William Bennett Munro Professor of Political Science at Stanford University. He was an influential scholar of constitutional law and civil liberties, as well as race and ethnic politics in the United States. He published works on civil liberties in the United States and systemic racism. He was also involved with several presidential campaigns, and he wrote books about the Jesse Jackson 1984 presidential campaign, for which he was a convention delegate.

== Early life and education ==
Barker was born in Franklinton, Louisiana on June 11, 1928. He had five siblings.

Barker intended to study medicine while attending Southern University, where he obtained his bachelor's degree in political science in 1949. He decided to study political science after taking a class with Rodney Higgins. After graduating from Southern University in 1949, Barker earned a master's degree from the University of Illinois Urbana-Champaign in 1950, followed by a doctorate from the same institution four years later, where Jack Peltason was his advisor. Barker left his home state after his undergraduate studies in part due to discriminatory practices within higher education in Louisiana that gave financial incentives to attend graduate school out of state. Additionally, he was the first Black teaching assistant in the College of Arts and Science at the University of Illinois at Urbana Champaign.

== Career ==
=== Academic positions ===
After completing his PhD, Barker became a post-doctoral fellow at the University of Illinois Urbana-Champaign, and taught there for several years. He then returned to Southern University, followed by the University of Wisconsin–Milwaukee. In 1964, he was a Liberal Arts Fellow of Law and Political Science at the Harvard Law School. In 1967, Jack Peltason recruited Barker to return to the University of Illinois, where Peltason was chancellor and Barker was appointed assistant chancellor. In 1969, he joined the political science faculty at Washington University in St. Louis, where he became chair of the political science department, and was named the Edna Fischel Gellhorn Professor. In 1990, Barker moved to Stanford University, where he was appointed William Bennett Munro Professor of Political Science. Some of his notable include students included the likes US Rep. Joaquin Castro, his twin brother Julian Castro, and US. Senator Cory Booker. He retired in 2006.

Barker was the 1992–1993 president of the American Political Science Association (ASPA). He was the second Black president of the association; the first, 40 years before, had been Ralph Bunche. Barker's work while president focused in part on the systemic challenges faced by Black Americans in trying to participate in the political system. Taking a systemic approach to political analysis was a staple of Barker's research, and was a natural cornerstone of his leadership of the ASPA. The opening of his presidential address in 1993 called for understanding the advancements and hurdles faced by Black Americans through a systemic perspective, highlighting an area of work he focused on while serving as the head of the ASPA. In it Barker discusses the limits of political participation due to both obstacles for their involvement and a system structured to disproportionately harm them, saying, with greater participation having the reverse effect of favored policies becoming weaker. Providing a historical review, Barker analyzes the shift from a legal based movement led by the NAACP to a mobilization protest movement heralded by Martin Luther King Jr., which worked to achieve somewhat different goals within a larger movement.

In addition to his review of Black political participation and the systemic challenges that have stymied progress, Barker uses his speech as a call to action for political scientists to recognize their own role in overlooking role in shaping systemic problems, and work to truly analyze volatile topics such as race. Elite institutions and tenured professors both possess privileges in the ability to inform and legitamize opinions in political discussions, and their perch from with they can offer important and fresh research. Finally, Barker also highlights the need for more Black academics to expand the perspectives considered, and laments the lack of many Black academics who could speak on topics of grave importance, even noting the high volume of requests he would receive to speak on panels or participate in interviews.

He was also the 1984 president of the Midwest Political Science Association (MPSA). The MPSA established an annual award in Barker's honor, recognizing exemplary papers on the topic of race or ethnicity and politics. Barker was the founding editor of the National Review of Black Politics (then the National Political Science Review), a journal of the National Conference of Black Political Scientists. He also served as the president of the National Conference of Black Political Scientists.

=== Research ===
Barker's new perspective on political science was clear in his PhD thesis on the Tideland Oil Controversy and the ensuing court battle. It was significant for arguing that the Supreme Court also played a role as a policymaker, a belief that would undergird his research throughout his career. This was an area of research that Barker explored along with C. Herman Pritchett and Robert Dahl, and would further explore in later publications. In 1967 Barker would publish "Third Parties in Litigation: A Systemic View of the Judicial Function" which further argued that the judicial system played an important role in policy that should be considered in relation to the other branches. The article also touched on the role of amicus curiae (or "friend of the court" briefs); along with the legal work conducted by the NAACP throughout the Civil Rights Movement, a topic that would appear in his presidential address.

In addition to articles and chapters in edited volumes, Barker authored dozens of books. Several of these books have been described as foundational studies of topics in American politics. In 65, Lucius Barker and his brother Twiley Barker co-authored the book "Freedom, Courts, Politics: Studies in Civil Liberties." textbook Civil Liberties and the Constitution. This textbook had been published in 9 editions by 2020, and is considered a classic textbook on the structure of the American legal system. In 1980, he published Black Americans and the Political System (published in later editions as African Americans and the American Political System), which the American Political Science Association publication Political Science Now called "a defining book on systemic racism through a political lens." He wrote a book on Jesse Jackson's presidential campaign, called Our time has come: A delegate's diary of Jesse Jackson's 1984 presidential campaign. The book consists of Barker's thoughts about Jackson's campaign. Chronicling the 1984 Democratic Presidential Primary, Barker felt himself morph from an academic observer to an activist delegate.

== Personal life ==
Barker married Maude Beavers in 1965. They had two daughters. Maude died in May 2020. Barker died two months later on June 21, 2020, at 92 at his home in his home at Menlo Park, California from complications of Alzheimer's disease

== Selected works ==
- "Third Parties in Litigation: A Systemic View of the Judicial Function", The Journal of Politics (1967)
- Civil Liberties and the Constitution, with Twiley Barker (1970)
- African Americans and the American Political System, with Mack H. Jones and Katherine Tate (1980)
- Our time has come: A delegate's diary of Jesse Jackson's 1984 presidential campaign (1984)
- Jesse Jackson's 1984 presidential campaign: Challenge and change in American politics, with Ronald W. Walters (1989)
