= Denham Springs Collegiate Institute =

Location
- Denham Springs, Livingston Parish, La; United States
- 30.489634°N 90.960379°W

Information
- Type: Boarding
- Founded: 1895
- Founder: Denham Springs Citizens
- Closed: 1908

The Denham Springs Collegiate Institute was a school founded by a group of Denham Springs, Louisiana residents in 1895.

The Institute included a large meeting hall and a smaller wooden framed building. It had a four-year curriculum. The Institute was located on the site of the existing First Presbyterian Church on North College Drive.

In 1908, the board gave the Institute buildings and its property to the Denham Springs public school system. Shortly thereafter, a two-story brick building was erected on the same site. This was the beginning of Denham Springs High School.
