= Derrick Dillon =

American football player (born 1995)

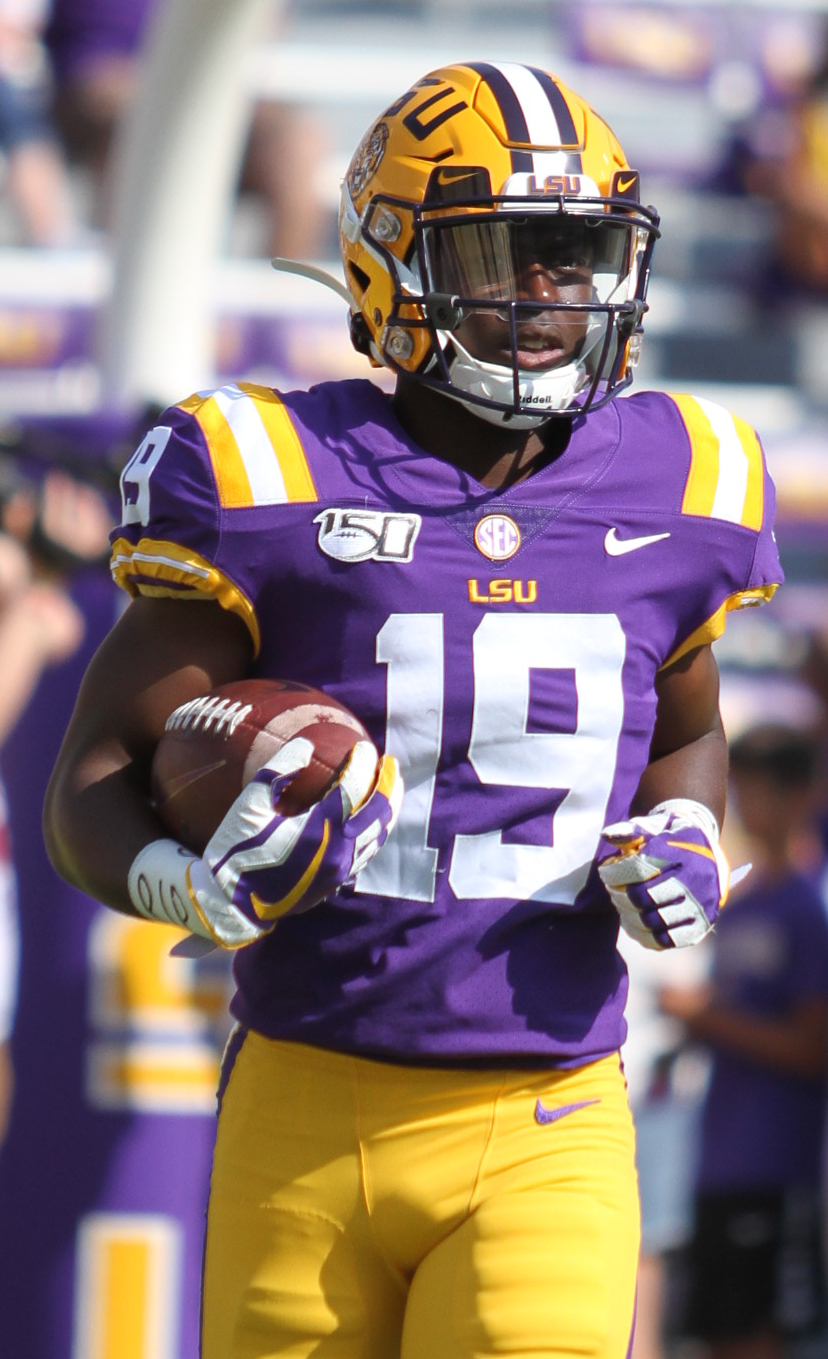
- Dillon at LSU in 2019

No. 19
- Positions: Wide receiver, Kick returner

Personal information
- Born: October 28, 1995 (age 31); Franklinton, Louisiana, U.S.
- Listed height: 5 ft 11 in (1.80 m)
- Listed weight: 185 lb (84 kg)

Career information
- High school: Pine (Franklinton, Louisiana)
- College: LSU
- NFL draft: 2020: undrafted

Career history
- New York Giants (2020–2021)*; Tampa Bay Bandits (2022); Cleveland Browns (2022)*; Memphis Showboats (2023)
- * Offseason or practice squad member only

Awards and highlights
- USFL: USFL Special Teams Player of the Year (2023); NCAA: CFP national champion (2019); USFL records: 109-yard return; Most career kickoff return yards: 1,200

Career USFL statistics as of 2023
- Receptions: 56
- Receiving yards: 726
- Return yards: 1,200
- Total touchdowns: 7
- Stats at Pro Football Reference

Derrick Dillon (born October 28, 1995) is an American former football wide receiver. He played college football at LSU.

== Early life ==
Dillon attended Pine High School in Franklinton, Louisiana. Dillon initially committed to Florida but switched his commitment to LSU.

== College career ==
Dillon redshirted his freshman year and played eight games, primarily on special teams as a redshirt freshman. As a sophomore in 2017, he rushed for 86 yards on 15 rushes and added 125 yards on 14 receptions. Dillon caught a 71-yard, fourth-quarter touchdown reception against Auburn in 2018. He also had a 49-yard touchdown pass from Joe Burrow in the Fiesta Bowl victory over UCF. Dillon caught 22 passes for 307 yards and two touchdowns as a junior. He underwent hip surgery in February 2019 and missed spring practices. Dillon caught two passes for 22 yards against Oklahoma in the 2019 College Football Playoff Semifinal. As a senior in 2019, Dillon made 15 catches for 202 yards and two touchdowns. He started three games when Terrace Marshall Jr. was out with an injury. Dillon participated in the East-West Shrine Bowl. in his career, Dillon caught 51 passes for 634 yards and four touchdowns. In a makeshift pro day after the LSU event was cancelled, Dillon ran a 4.29 in a 40-yard dash.

== Professional career ==
Pre-draft measurables
Height	Weight
5 ft 10 3/4 in (1.80 m)	186 lb (84 kg)
Values from Pro Day

=== New York Giants ===
After going undrafted in the 2020 NFL draft, Dillon signed an undrafted free agent deal with the New York Giants. He was given a $15,000 signing bonus in addition to a guaranteed salary of $25,000 for the 2020 season. He was waived on September 5, 2020, and signed to the practice squad the next day. He was released from the practice squad on September 8 and re-signed again on September 16. He was released on December 1, 2020. He signed a reserve/future contract with the Giants on January 5, 2021. He was placed on injured reserve on August 3, 2021. Dillon was cut by the Giants on August 11.

=== Tampa Bay Bandits ===
Dillon was selected in the 15th round of the 2022 USFL draft by the Tampa Bay Bandits.

As a wide receiver Dillon finished the season with 28 receptions for 386 yards, and one touchdown. As a kick returner, Dillon had 19 returns for 447 yards.

=== Cleveland Browns ===
On August 1, 2022, Dillon signed with the Cleveland Browns. He was waived by the Browns on August 15, 2022.

=== Memphis Showboats ===
Dillon signed with the Memphis Showboats of the USFL on January 11, 2023.

On May 20, 2023, in a 22–0 win over the Pittsburgh Maulers, Dillon returned a missed 59-yard field goal attempt for a 109-yard touchdown. Dillon's performance earned him the USFL's Special Teams Player of the Week.

Dillon caught his first touchdown of the season on May 28, 2023, against the Houston Gamblers in a 64-yard catch and run from quarterback Cole Kelley. The Showboats won the game 23–20.

On June 17, 2023, during the final week of the USFL season against the Birmingham Stallions, Dillon returned the opening kickoff for a 90-yard touchdown. Despite Dillion's efforts, the Showboats lost the game 27–20, and were eliminated from the playoff contention.

Dillon finished the season with 28 receptions for 340 yards, and one touchdown. Dillon also had 23 kick returns for 753 yards, and one touchdown, plus a 109-yard touchdown via missed field goal return. He was later named Special Teams Player of the Year. He was released on March 10, 2024.

== Career statistics ==
Year	Team	Games		Receiving					Rushing					Kick returns					Fumbles	
Year	Team	GP	GS	Rec	Yds	Avg	Lng	TD	Att	Yds	Avg	Lng	TD	Ret	Yds	Avg	Lng	TD	Fum	Lost
2022	TB	10	10	28	386	13.7	75	4	1	-9	-9.0	-9	0	19	447	23.5	32	0	0	0
2023	MEM	9	9	28	340	12.1	64T	1	2	15	7.5	11	0	23	753	32.7	90T	1	0	0
Career		19	19	56	726	13.0	75	5	3	6	2.0	11	0	42	1,200	28.6	90T	1	0	0

== Personal life ==
Dillon's father Earl Cotton died on March 7, 2018, due to complications from a bacterial infection. Dillon has two sisters.
