= Bogue Chitto National Wildlife Refuge =

United States National Wildlife Refuge in Louisiana and Mississippi

- IUCN category IV (habitat/species management area)
- Location within the United States
- Location: Pearl River County, Mississippi; St. Tammany Parish, Louisiana Washington Parish, Louisiana
- Nearest city: Picayune, Mississippi
- Coordinates: 30°32′51″N 89°47′38″W
- Area: 40,000 acres or 160 km^{2}
- Established: 1980
- Governing body: U.S. Fish and Wildlife Service
- Website: Bogue Chitto National Wildlife Refuge

Bogue Chitto National Wildlife Refuge

Bogue Chitto National Wildlife Refuge is located 60 mi (97 km) northeast of New Orleans, Louisiana, U.S., and encompasses 36,000 acres (150 km^{2}) of Pearl River Basin swampland.

== History ==
On June 30, 1980, President Jimmy Carter signed Public Law 96-288 authorizing the 40,000-acre (160 km^{2}) Bogue Chitto National Wildlife Refuge (NWR) in Washington and St. Tammany Parishes, Louisiana, and Pearl River County, Mississippi. Since that time, the U.S. Fish and Wildlife Service has been acquiring bottomland hardwood habitat in the Pearl River Basin. On December 13, 1989, Congress authorized a boundary expansion for Bogue Chitto NWR that included an additional 8,400 acres (34 km^{2}) of bottomland hardwoods in St. Tammany Parish. To date, some 36,447 acres (147.50 km^{2}) have been placed under refuge management. The refuge is still in an acquisition phase.

== Access ==
Access is primarily by boat on the refuge's Louisiana side and road access is available on the refuge's Mississippi side. In the summer of 2002, a new 0.75 mi (1.21 km) walking trail was unveiled on the Louisiana side of the Refuge that allows access into the interior of Bogue Chitto's habitat.

== Wildlife and habitat ==
The refuge is home to hundreds of bird species. The most abundant species are the Neotropical migrants, including the prothonotary and Swainson's warblers, tyrant flycatchers, yellow-billed cuckoo, and white-eyed vireo. In smaller numbers found on the refuge are migratory game birds such as American woodcock and wild turkey, wading birds such as egrets and herons, waterfowl such as wood duck, and raptors such as hawks and owls. Endangered and threatened species found on the refuge are bald eagle, ringed map turtle, gopher tortoise, inflated heelsplitter, and Gulf sturgeon. White-tail deer, squirrel, turkey and wild boar hunting and fishing are offered to the public.

Bogue Chitto NWR is primarily composed of bottomland hardwood habitat interlaced by the Bogue Chitto and Pearl river systems. Numerous sloughs, bayous and lakes are located on the refuge. Water levels fluctuate by several feet from their low point in the summer to winter/spring flood stage. Over 90% of the refuge can be flooded during seasonal high river periods. The mixed hardwood forest includes water oak, overcup oak, American elm, sweetgum, and red maple on higher elevations and bald cypress, water tupelo, and black tupelo along the wettest areas. Mid-story in mixed hardwoods includes American Hophornbeam, Southern Arrowwood, Virginia Sweetspire and reproduction of the overstory. Typical mid-story plants along the sloughs and bayous are Buttonbush, Eastern Swampprivet, and Water Elm.
