= Denham Springs City Hall =

- U.S. National Register of Historic Places
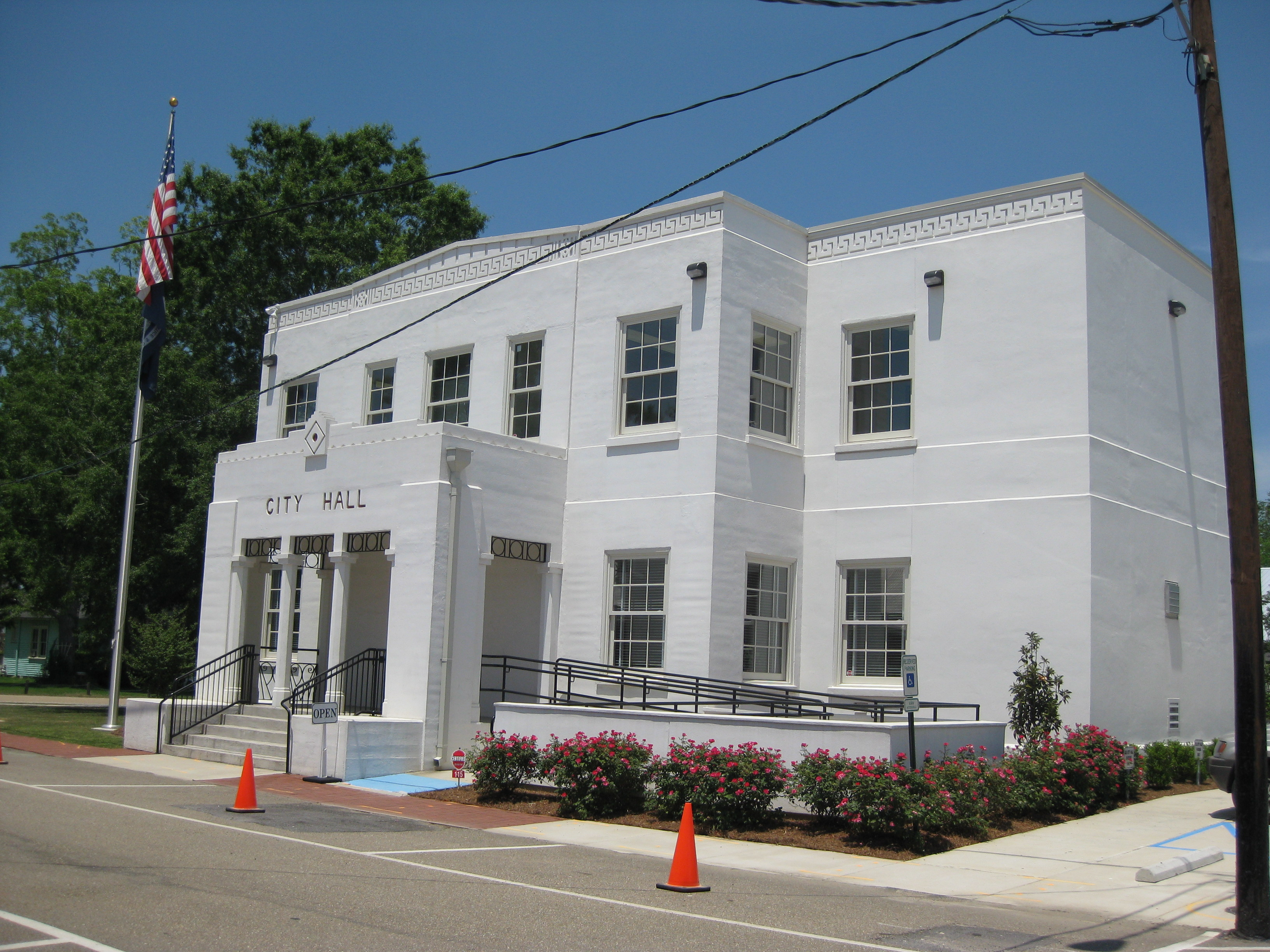
- Denham Springs City Hall

- Location within Louisiana Location within the United States
- Location: 115 Mattie Street, Denham Springs, Louisiana
- Coordinates: 30°29′08″N 90°57′24″W
- Area: Less than one acre
- Built: 1940
- Built by: WPA
- Architect: E. G. Blakewood
- Architectural style: Art Deco
- NRHP reference No.: 93000304
- Added to NRHP: April 16, 1993

The Denham Springs City Hall, also known as the Old Denham Springs City Hall, is a historic building located at 115 Mattie Street in Denham Springs, Louisiana.

Built in the late 1930s by the WPA and last used in the 1980s, the building is a two-story concrete structure in Art Deco style. A complete restoration, costing some $695,000, was completed in late 2008 and rededication ceremonies held on April 17. The building now serves as a tourism office, where maps and information are distributed to people visiting the Antique Village. The original building housed the mayor and sheriff's offices, library, and the jail.

The building was listed in the National Register of Historic Places listings in Louisiana on April 16, 1993.

== See also ==
- National Register of Historic Places listings in Livingston Parish, Louisiana
