= Phil Short =

American politician (born 1947)

Philip Granville Short
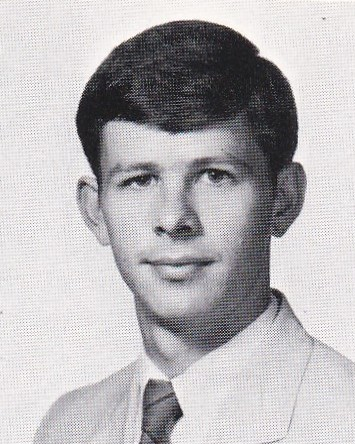
- Phil Short as a student at Louisiana Tech University (1969)

Louisiana State Senator from District 12 (St. Helena, St. Tammany, Tangipahoa, and Washington parishes)
- In office 1996–1999
- Preceded by: B.B. "Sixty" Rayburn
- Succeeded by: Jerry Aroe Thomas

Personal details
- Born: January 31, 1947 (age 79)
- Party: Republican
- Spouse: Suzanne Richards Short
- Education: C.E. Byrd High School Louisiana Tech University Webster University
- Occupation: Lieutenant colonel in United States Marine Corps
- Short unseated the legendary Sixty Rayburn in the Louisiana State Legislature but served only three years of his term. He resigned to take a position with the United States Marine Corps in Washington, D.C.

Philip Granville Short, known as Phil Short (born January 31, 1947), is a retired military officer formerly from Covington, Louisiana, USA, who served in the Louisiana State Senate for District 12 (St. Helena, St. Tammany, Tangipahoa, and Washington parishes) from 1996 to 1999.

Preceded by B.B. "Sixty" Rayburn	Louisiana State Senator for the 12th District (St. Helena, St. Tammany, Tangipahoa, and Washington parishes); Philip Granville "Phil" Short; 1996–1999	Succeeded by Dr. Jerry Thomas
