= Louisiana's 12th State Senate district =

American legislative district

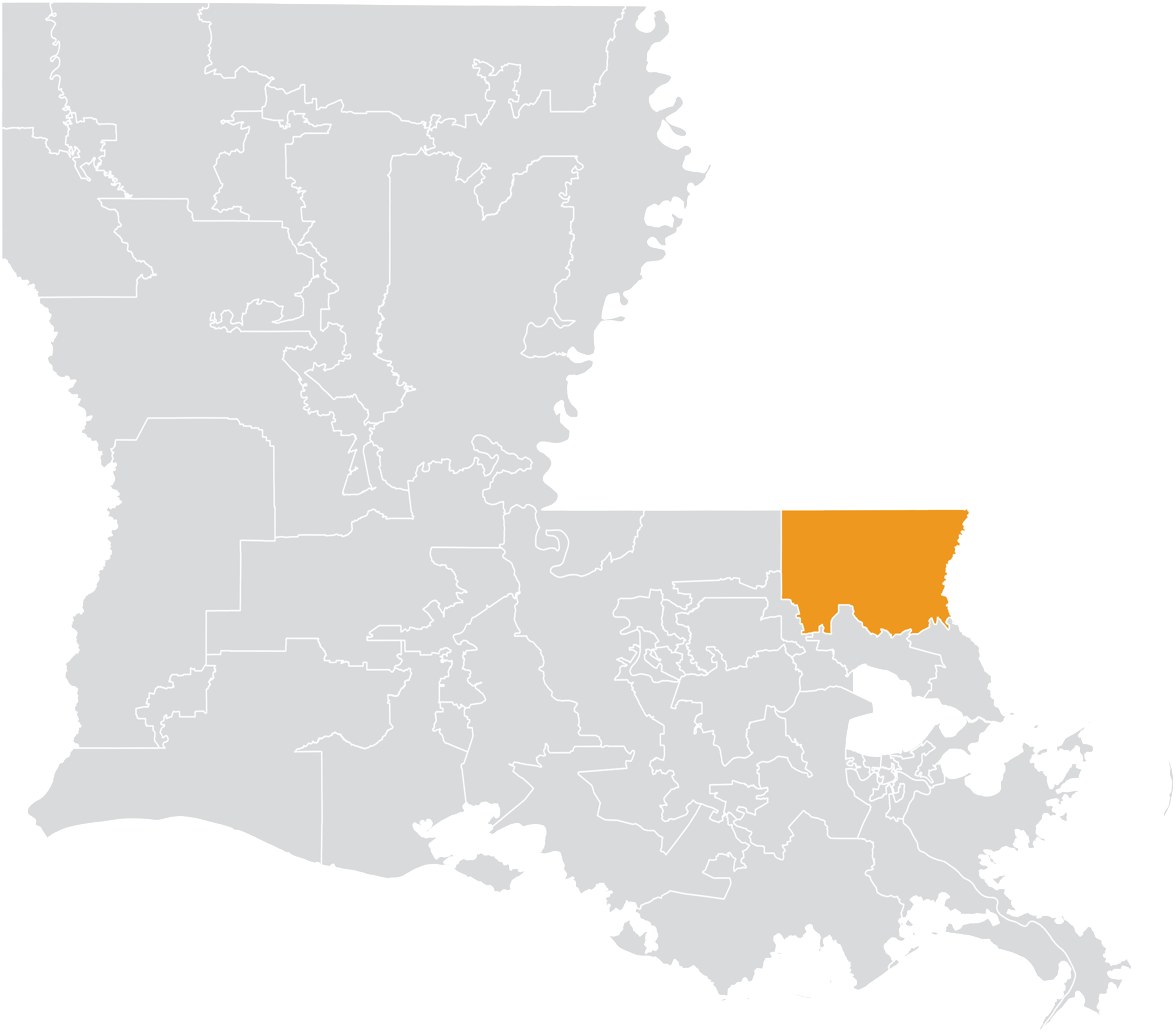
Senator
Beth Mizell; R–Franklinton
- Registration: 40.3% Democratic; 34.3% Republican; 25.4% No party preference
- Demographics: 68% White; 27% Black; 3% Hispanic; 0% Asian; 1% Other
- Population (2019): 122,400
- Registered voters: 77,312

Louisiana's 12th State Senate district is one of 39 districts in the Louisiana State Senate. It has been represented by Republican Beth Mizell since 2016.

== Geography ==
District 12 covers all of Washington Parish and the northernmost parts of St. Tammany and Tangipahoa Parishes, including some or all of Bogalusa, Franklinton, Kentwood, Amite, and Hammond.

The district overlaps with Louisiana's 1st and 5th congressional districts, and with the 72nd, 74th, 75th, 77th, and 86th districts of the Louisiana House of Representatives.

== Recent election results ==
Louisiana uses a jungle primary system. If no candidate receives 50% in the first round of voting, when all candidates appear on the same ballot regardless of party, the top-two finishers advance to a runoff election.

=== 2019 ===
2019 Louisiana State Senate election, District 12
Party	Candidate	Votes	%
Republican	Beth Mizell (incumbent)	24,590	68.6
Democratic	Darrell Fairburn	11,266	31.4
Total votes		35,856	100
Republican hold			

=== 2015 ===
2015 Louisiana State Senate election, District 12
Primary election
Party	Candidate	Votes	%
Republican	Beth Mizell	14,344	43.4
Democratic	Mickey Murphy	10,767	32.6
Republican	Brett Duncan	6,827	20.6
Independent	John Seal	1,138	3.4
Total votes		33,076	100
General election
Republican	Beth Mizell	19,404	58.0
Democratic	Mickey Murphy	14,033	42.0
Total votes		33,437	100
Republican gain from Democratic			

=== 2011 ===
2011 Louisiana State Senate election, District 12
Party	Candidate	Votes	%
Democratic	Ben Nevers (incumbent)	15,116	50.6
Republican	Beth Mizell	14,764	49.4
Total votes		29,880	100
Democratic hold			

=== Federal and statewide results ===
Year	Office	Results
2020	President	Trump 69.2–29.5%
2019	Governor (runoff)	Rispone 51.7–48.3%
2016	President	Trump 68.2–29.3%
2015	Governor (runoff)	Edwards 55.7–44.3%
2014	Senate (runoff)	Cassidy 61.9–38.1%
2012	President	Romney 65.6–32.8%
