= Billy Burris =

American judge

Associate Justice of the Louisiana Supreme Court
- Incumbent
- Assumed office June 17, 2026
- Preceded by: Allison Penzato (acting)

Personal details
- Born: 1981 (age 44–45) Franklinton, Louisiana, U.S.
- Party: Republican
- Education: Louisiana State University (BA); Southern University (JD)

William H. Burris is an American judge. A member of the Republican Party, he has served as an associate justice of the Louisiana Supreme Court since 2026. He previously served as a judge of the 22nd Judicial District Court from 2018 to 2026.

== Life and career ==
Burris was born in Franklinton, Louisiana, the son of William J. Burris, also a judge. He attended and graduated from Franklinton High School. He attended Louisiana State University, earning his BA degree in philosophy. He also attended Southern University Law Center, earning his JD degree.

Burris served as a judge of the 22nd Judicial District Court from 2018 to 2026. After his service as district judge, he has served as associate justice of the Louisiana Supreme Court since 2026.

Legal offices
Preceded by Allison Penzato; Acting	Associate Justice of the Louisiana Supreme Court; 2026–present	Incumbent
