= Denham Springs Freshman High School =

Denham Springs High School

Location
- Denham Springs, Louisiana; United States
- Coordinates: 30.49501°N 90.95566°W

Information
- Type: Public high school
- Oversight: Livingston Parish Public Schools
- Principal: Kenneth Magee
- Grades: 9
- Enrollment: 710 (2023-2024)
- Colors: Purple, Gold, and White
- Mascot: Yellow Jackets
- School Hours: 7:27 AM to 2:48PM
- Mission: Jackets; Are; Committed to Knowledge, Excellence, Teamwork, & Success!
- Website: www.dsfreshmanhigh.org

Denham Springs Freshman High (DSFH) is a high school in Denham Springs, Louisiana, United States that consists of mostly freshman, few sophomores cross over the street from the Denham High School to the Freshman High to complete certain classes, if needed .

DSFH is affiliated and located adjacent to Denham Springs High School.

DSFH has 11 clubs and 16 sports.
