= Rodney Higgins =

American political scientist

- Born: 1911; St. Louis, Missouri
- Died: 1964 (aged 52–53)
- Education: Southern Illinois Teachers College; University of Iowa
- Spouse: Mildred Higgins
- Scientific career
- Fields: Political science
- Workplaces: Southern University
- Doctoral students: Jewel Prestage; Lucius Barker; Shelby F. Lewis

Rodney G. Higgins (1911–1964) was an American political scientist. He was the chair of the political science department at Southern University from 1946, two years before the department awarded its first degree, until 1964. Higgins and has been credited with laying a foundation for the social sciences at Southern University. He was the namesake of the Rodney G. Higgins Hall for Social Sciences at Southern University.

== Life and career ==
Higgins was born in 1911 and grew up in St. Louis, Missouri. He attended Southern Illinois Teachers College, where he graduated with a B.Ed. degree in 1935. He then attended the University of Iowa, where he obtained an M.A. in 1936 and a Ph.D. in 1940, both in political science. Higgins joined the United States Army in 1943, and in 1944 he joined the American Red Cross.

Higgins subsequently became a professor at Southern University. He was chair of the department from 1946 to 1964. This made him central to the development of political science and other social sciences at Southern University, which awarded its first degree in political science in 1948. During Higgins's time as chair, the department awarded hundreds of degrees. According to Southern University's Southern Digest, Higgins "established a foundation for not only Political Science at Southern, but also Sociology, History, Economics and Geography". As a researcher Higgins made contributions to journals including University of Iowa Studies and the Quarterly Review of Higher Education among Negroes.

The Rodney G. Higgins Hall for Social Sciences at Southern University was named after Higgins. Higgins is also the namesake of the Rodney Higgins Best Faculty Paper Award given annually by the National Conference of Black Political Scientists. Higgins was particularly noted as a teacher and as an advisor, and several prominent political scientists identified him as the person who first made them consider studying politics. His students included Jewel Prestage, Lucius Barker, and Shelby F. Lewis.

Higgins died in 1964. He remained chair of the political science department at Southern University until his death.
