= Franklinton, Louisiana =

- Town
- Town of Franklinton
- Location of Franklinton in Washington Parish, Louisiana.

- Location of Louisiana in the United States
- Coordinates: 30°51′12″N 90°07′55″W
- Country: United States
- State: Louisiana
- Parish: Washington
- Founded: 1819

Government
  - Mayor: Darwin Sharp

Area
  - Total: 4.41 sq mi (11.43 km^{2})
  - Land: 4.37 sq mi (11.32 km^{2})
  - Water: 0.042 sq mi (0.11 km^{2})
- Elevation: 167 ft (51 m)

Population (2020)
  - Total: 3,662
  - Density: 837.9/sq mi (323.51/km^{2})
- Time zone: UTC-6 (CST)
  - Summer (DST): UTC-5 (CDT)
- ZIP Code: 70438
- Area code: 985
- FIPS code: 22-27190
- GNIS feature ID: 2406520
- Website: www.townoffranklinton.com

Franklinton is a town in, and the parish seat of Washington Parish, Louisiana, United States. As of the 2020 census, Franklinton had a population of 3,662. The elevation is an average of 155 feet (47 m) above sea level. Franklinton is located 61 miles (98 km) north of New Orleans.

A Franklinton physician, Jerry Thomas, represented Washington Parish in the Louisiana House of Representatives from 1988 to 1999. He was elected to the District 12 seat in the state senate, serving from 1999 to 2004. He had succeeded Phil Short of Covington, who resigned. Prior to his state service, Dr. Thomas was the Washington Parish coroner from 1980 to 1988.

Elected in 2015, Beth Mizell, a businesswoman from Franklinton, is the current District 12 state senator.

== History ==
Franklinton was founded in 1819, originally under the name of Franklin. It was designated as the parish seat of government on February 10, 1821, two years after the parish was carved out from St. Tammany Parish.

In 1826 the town's name was changed to Franklinton, as there was already another town named Franklin in St. Mary Parish. In 1826, representatives and citizens from both communities showed up in then-state-capital New Orleans to state their cases for keeping the name "Franklin." The legislature allowed Franklin in St. Mary Parish to retain its name, while changing the Washington Parish's newer seat to Franklinton. The parish was largely rural, based in extensive pine forests.

=== 20th century to present ===
==== 1935 lynching ====
In the early hours of January 11, 1935, a small group of white men forced their way into the Washington Parish jail in Franklinton, fatally shooting and beating Jerome Wilson, 30, an African-American man convicted of murder. He had pleaded for mercy. Five days earlier the Louisiana Supreme Court had granted Wilson a new trial, on the grounds that he had not received a fair trial. The decision cited that he was tried, convicted, and sentenced within ten days of his arrest in August in the slaying of Deputy Sheriff Delos C. Wood in a gunfight on the Wilson place.

The lynch party took Wilson's body by car and dumped it along a rural road three miles (5 km) from town; then they dispersed. The body was found by a passerby on the road two hours later. Police officers said they thought Wilson was shot because his cries would have aroused parish authorities, who twice had thwarted attempts to lynch him.

In 2005, much of Franklinton, as well as most of Washington Parish, sustained damage from Hurricane Katrina. It caused extensive damage along the Gulf Coast.

== Geography ==
According to the United States Census Bureau, the town has a total area of 4.2 square miles (10.9 km^{2}), of which 4.1 square miles (10.7 km^{2}) is land and 0.04 square mile (0.1 km^{2}) (0.95%) is water.

The Bogue Chitto River flows through the western edge of the town.

== Demographics ==
Historical population
Census	Pop.	Note	%±
1860	143		—
1870	121		−15.4%
1890	97		—
1900	236		143.3%
1910	814		244.9%
1920	964		18.4%
1930	963		−0.1%
1940	1,579		64.0%
1950	2,342		48.3%
1960	3,141		34.1%
1970	3,562		13.4%
1980	4,119		15.6%
1990	4,007		−2.7%
2000	3,657		−8.7%
2010	3,857		5.5%
2020	3,662		−5.1%
2025 (est.)	3,576	▼	−2.3%
U.S. Decennial Census

Franklinton racial composition as of 2020
Race	Number	Percentage
White (non-Hispanic)	1,656	45.22%
Black or African American (non-Hispanic)	1,769	48.31%
Native American	11	0.3%
Asian	19	0.52%
Other/Mixed	89	2.43%
Hispanic or Latino	118	3.22%

As of the 2020 United States census, there were 3,662 people, 1,739 households, and 930 families residing in the town.

== Economy ==
The town's economy is based heavily on the parish agriculture, forestry, and some commercial industry. Many residents commute south into St. Tammany Parish for employment.

== Arts and culture ==
The Washington Parish Free Fair, the largest free fair in the US and the second-largest county fair in Louisiana, is held during the third week of October each year at the Washington Parish Fair Grounds in Franklinton.

== Media ==
The Era-Leader, the oldest newspaper in Washington Parish, is based in Franklinton and covers mainly the western half of the parish. It is the Official Journal of Washington Parish.

The Daily News is published once per week. It is based in Bogalusa but it covers all of the parish.

== In popular culture ==
The book, Dead Man Walking (1993) by Sister Helen Prejean, and the 1995 film of the same name adapted from the book, referred to the murder of Faith Hathaway by Robert Lee Willie and Joseph Vaccaro, and their convictions. The murder took place at Fricke's Cave (now part of Bogue Chitto State Park).

== Education ==
- Washington Parish School System
- Mount Hermon School (PreK–12)
- Franklinton High School
- Franklinton Junior High
- Franklinton Elementary School
- Franklinton Primary School
- Bowling Green School

== National Guard ==
Franklinton is the home of the 843rd Engineer Company. It is part of the 205th Engineer Battalion in Bogalusa, and the larger 225th Engineer Brigade of the Louisiana National Guard.

== Notable people ==
- Lucius Barker, American political scientist
- Twiley Barker, American political scientist
- Billy Burris, American judge
- John L. Crain, president of Southeastern Louisiana University
- Derrick Dillon, professional football player
- Katherine Haik, Miss Teen USA 2015
- Adrian Magee, professional football player
- Ruchell Magee, convicted in 1970 Marin County Civic Center attacks
- Terrence Magee, professional football player
- Beth Mizell, businesswoman and Louisiana state senator
- Chanda Rigby, head coach of Troy Trojans women basketball team

== Climate ==
The climate in this area is characterized by hot, humid summers and generally mild to cool winters. According to the Köppen Climate Classification system, Franklinton has a humid subtropical climate, abbreviated "Cfa" on climate maps.
