= Denham Springs, Louisiana =

- City
- City of Denham Springs
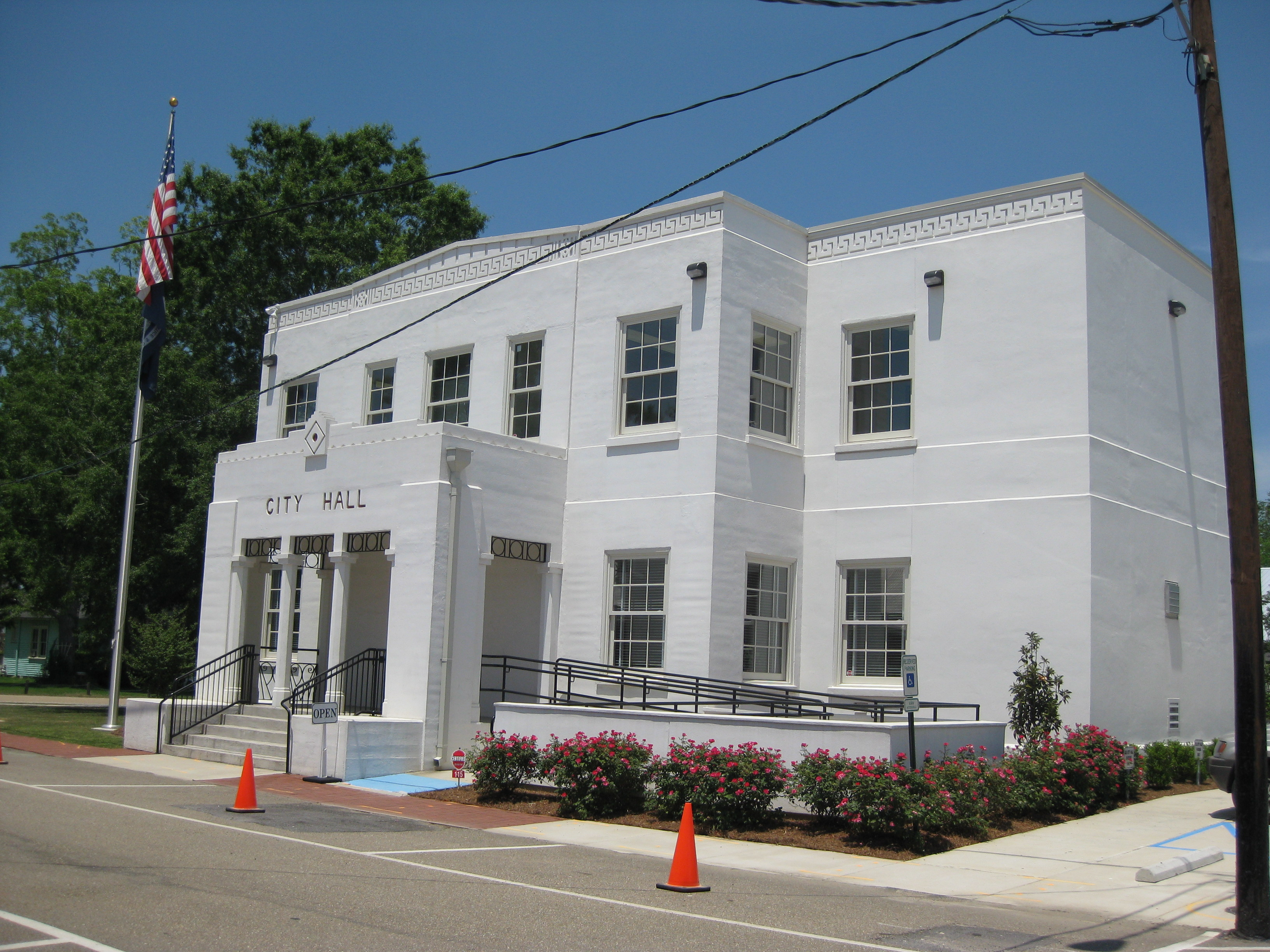
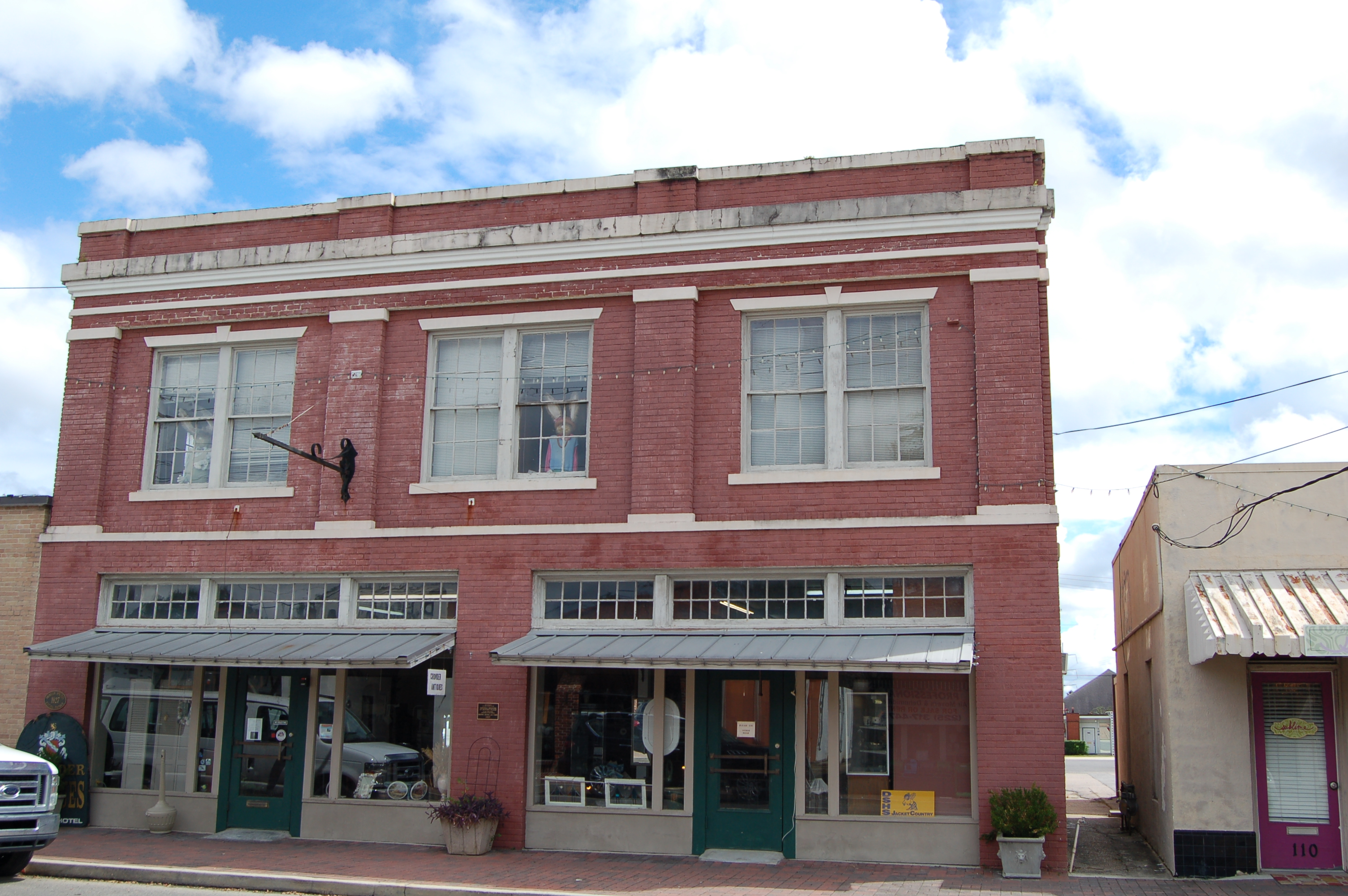
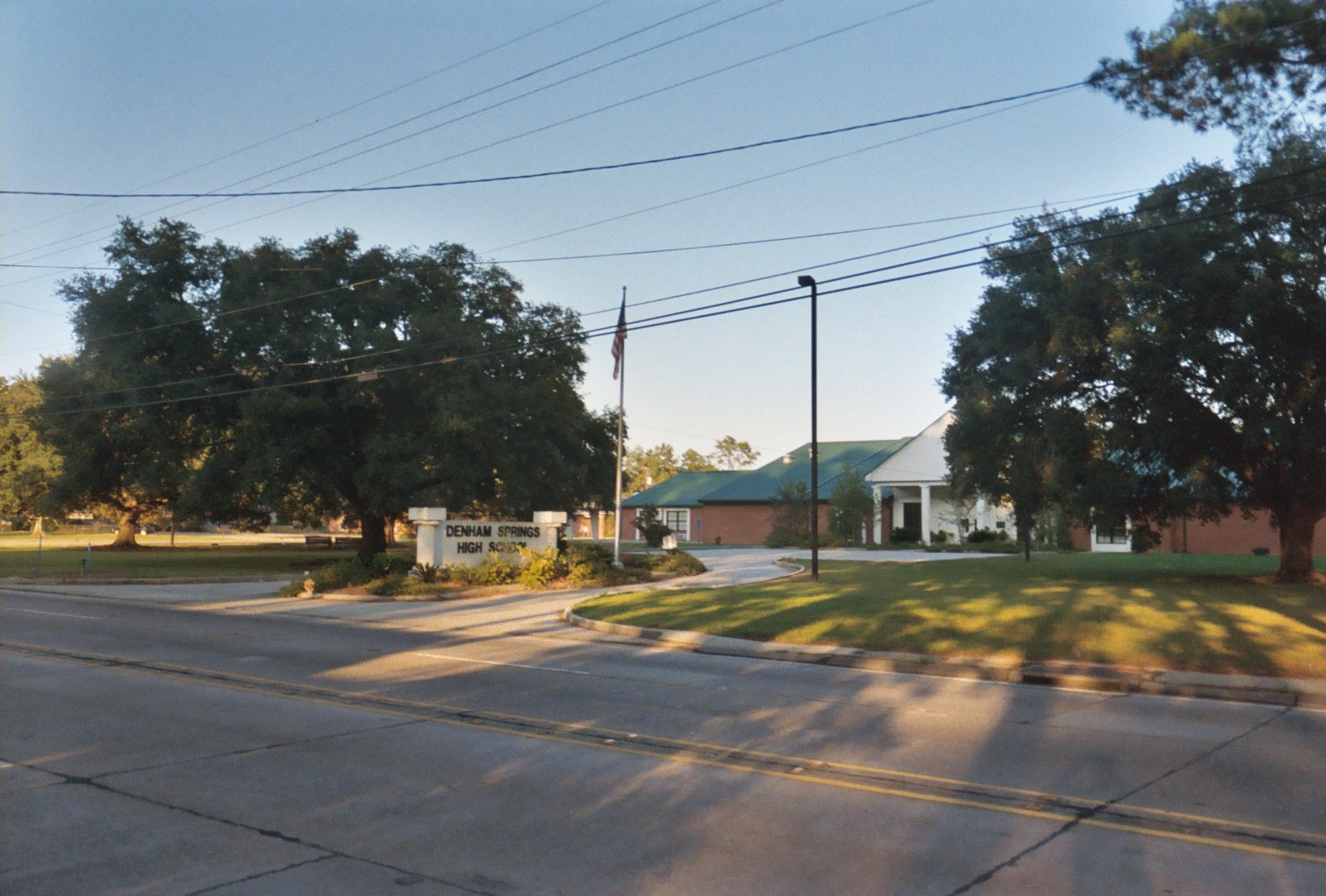
- From top, left to right: Old Denham Springs City Hall, Old Brown Hotel, Denham Springs High School

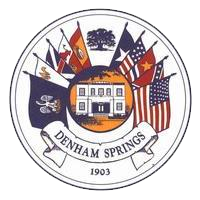
- Seal
- Nickname: The Bedroom of Baton Rouge
- Interactive map of Denham Springs, Louisiana
- Location within Louisiana Location within the United States Location within North America
- Coordinates: 30°28′47″N 90°57′15″W
- Country: United States
- State: Louisiana
- Parish: Livingston
- Named for: Local spring and William Denham

Government
  - Type: Mayor-council Government
  - Body: Denham Springs City Council
  - Mayor: Gerard Landry

Area
  - Total: 7.36 sq mi (19.05 km^{2})
  - Land: 7.29 sq mi (18.89 km^{2})
  - Water: 0.062 sq mi (0.16 km^{2})
- Elevation: 43 ft (13 m)

Population (2020)
  - Total: 9,286
  - Density: 1,273.3/sq mi (491.64/km^{2})
- Demonym: Denhamite
- Time zone: UTC-6 (CST)
  - Summer (DST): UTC-5 (CDT)
- ZIP Code: 70726
- Area codes: 225
- FIPS code: 22-20435
- Website: www.cityofdenhamsprings.com

Denham Springs is a city in Livingston Parish, Louisiana, United States. The 2010 U.S. census placed the population at 10,215, up from 8,757 at the 2000 U. S. census. At the 2020 United States census, 9,286 people lived in the city. The city is the largest area of commercial and residential development in Livingston Parish. Denham Springs and Walker are the only parish municipalities classified as cities. The area has been known as Amite Springs, Hill's Springs, and Denham Springs.

== History ==
=== 19th century ===
The original land claims of John Noblet and Alexander Hogue form what is now the older section of Denham Springs, including the first residential and business districts. In 1828, William Denham, a Wilkinson County, Mississippi, native, married Mercy Hogue, the daughter of Alexander Hogue. Three months later he purchased the 640 acres (2.6 km^{2}) originally claimed by his father-in-law. Denham purchased the land and a slave for $1,350.

A popular belief, supported by previously published histories, is that William Denham discovered the mineral springs on his property and that a health resort quickly grew up there. This belief defies logic, however, considering the number of springs which may be found in this area even today, and the length of time that elapsed before Denham arrived. Hogue and other early residents of the area likely depended on the springs for drinking water.

It was in the 1850s that Amite Springs became synonymous with the area that is now Denham Springs.

On May 1, 1855, Denham sold the Hogue tract to Stamaty Covas of New Orleans for $3,050, and Denham eventually moved to Baton Rouge and to Texas. Apparently during the time Covas owned the Hogue-Denham tract, and before the Civil War, a health resort did flourish at Amite Springs—as the hamlet was known at the time. Several newspaper articles and advertisements survive from that period, which describe the hotel and the facilities which it offered.

An article in the Baton Rouge Daily Comet, on June 25, 1856, notes that a bridge of boats had been formed at Benton's Ferry over the Amite River to facilitate travel to Amite Springs. Benton's Ferry was the name of the post office which was established near Amite Springs on January 25, 1856, and named for Robert Benton, its first postmaster and also the operator of the ferry across the Amite.

It is assumed that the hotel was burned during the Civil War, although no evidence to support this assumption has been found to this date. Following the Civil War, Covas, the New Orleans businessman, lost possession of the Hogue-Denham tract when George L. Minton bought it for delinquent taxes of $124.00.

According to the 1882 act of sale, the land was bounded "east by Chambers, south by Noblet, west by the Amite River, north by Allen, and known as the Denham Springs tract." This points to the fact that although William Denham had moved away nearly 30 years before, his name was still associated with the mineral spring area.

Minton was the first mayor of Denham Springs and founder of the Denham Springs News. Thus, he received title to much of what is now the downtown section of Denham Springs. Conveyance records at the parish courthouse show that he then began subdividing the tract and selling the lots for residences and businesses. By this time, the large Noblet holdings were also being subdivided and sold to newcomers, and the village that became Denham Springs began to grow.

In October, 1879 John Sullivan made an application for the establishment of a post office north of the present city limits. The location of the office was given as one mile (1.6 km) south of Beaver Creek and one mile (1.6 km) east of the Amite River on what is now La. Hwy. 1028 or the Old River Road. Three names were considered for the post office - Pine Bluff, Allen and Hill's Springs - with the Post Office Department settling on the latter when it was finally established on January 12, 1880. By at least 1890, John R. Allen had become the postmaster and the office was moved inside the present city limits. On May 9, 1898, the name of the post office was changed to Denham Springs.

Another reason given for the development of the community is that the Denham Springs Collegiate Institute was founded by a group or residents in 1895. According to a graduate of the institute, the school was a good one, attracting boarders from miles around. The boarding students may have created more demand for hotels than did people visiting the springs, although the hotels did have many guests in the summer. The Collegiate Institute was located on the site of the present Presbyterian Church, on property sold to the private school by George L. Minton. The first buildings included a large meeting hall and a smaller frame structure. The four-year institution was financed by tuition paid by students from Denham Springs and neighboring communities, and the board of directors was able to attract teachers from as far away as Virginia.

=== 20th century ===
George L. Minton was elected the first mayor of Denham Springs upon its founding in 1903 and served until J.M. Smiley was elected in April 1912. Smiley moved from the village later that year and J.O. Brannon was elected mayor in a special election. He received 17 votes and was unopposed.

Two reasons were given for the development of Hill's Springs and Denham Springs in the 1890s and early 20th century prior to the completion of a Baton Rouge to Hammond railroad line. One was the development of the springs by hotel owners. A New Orleans publication entitled Men and Matters described the so-called health-restoring properties of the spring water in a 1902 article on Denham Springs. Ivy Cockerham and J.B. Easterly built hotels in the area near the present public park on Tabernacle Street, and there were some who believed the springs to be beneficial to the sick.

Circa 1908, the board of directors of the Denham Springs Collegiate Institute deeded the property to the public school system, which was coming of age with the construction of consolidated schools, and shortly thereafter, a two-story brick building was erected on the same site. This was to be the beginning of Denham Springs High School, now the parish's largest senior high school.

On May 8, 1903, Gov. William W. Heard issued a proclamation incorporating the village of Denham Springs. Governor Huey Long designated Denham Springs as a town on February 5, 1929 and Lt. Gov. Lethar Frazar, standing in for the Kingfish's brother Earl, proclaimed Denham Springs to be a city on September 5, 1957.

Several factors influenced the growth of Denham Springs after 1900, notably the construction of the railroad line, the growth of Baton Rouge as an industrial center, and the corresponding improvement of roads which made Denham Springs a desirable place for Baton Rouge workers to live. The railroad prompted the gradual movement of businesses toward the present Range Avenue area, and later made Denham Springs the shipping hub of a large truck crop region. The Baton Rouge-Hammond line was completed by the Illinois Central railroad during the first part of February, 1908 and the first train ran on February 26. Denham Springs almost missed being included on the route, however, as the Baton Rouge, Hammond and Eastern Railroad Co., which was later purchased by the IC, at one time considered bypassing the village, perhaps to force some concessions on the local residents' part.

The construction of good roads and the advent of the automobile, combined with the growth of the petrochemical industry in Baton Rouge led to Denham Springs becoming the so-called "bedroom of Baton Rouge". Denham Springs became the banking and commercial center of Livingston Parish.

The Denham Springs City Hall was listed in the National Register of Historic Places listings in Louisiana on April 16, 1993.

=== 21st century ===
The city is situated at the intersections of the east-west highways, US 190 and Interstate 12, with La. Hwy. 16, the major north-south artery in western Livingston Parish. Denham Springs is also located on the Illinois Central Gulf Railroad, a line which played a large role in the city's early development. The Amite River also forms a portion of the municipality's boundary, but the river is not navigable at this point. Ground-water springs which come to the surface at the base of the low-lying ridge which runs through the center of the city have figured in the city's name since at least the 1850s.

A state of emergency was declared in mid-August 2016 when waters began rising in rivers, lakes, and bayous all across the southern area of the state. Denham Springs took much of the damage. 90% of the homes in Greater Baton Rouge were either damaged or destroyed. The Amite River, the main body of water in Denham Springs, was one of the most publicized rivers that flooded.

Downtown Denham Springs has transformed itself from hardware stores, drug stores, doctors' offices, and a single movie theater, into a collection of unique antique shops, and boutiques, including the locally popular restaurants and Cafes. The historic downtown district is now recognized as a cultural arts district and is known as the Denham Springs Antique Village.

== Geography ==
Denham Springs is located in the Florida Parishes of the U. S. state of Louisiana, and within the Baton Rouge metropolitan statistical area.

=== Climate ===
Denham Springs has a humid subtropical climate with hot summers and mild winters. The city experiences moderate to heavy rainfall and is at risk of severe thunderstorms and high winds year around.

Climate data for Denham Springs
Month	Jan	Feb	Mar	Apr	May	Jun	Jul	Aug	Sep	Oct	Nov	Dec	Year
Average rainfall mm (inches)	134.9 (5.31)	137.9 (5.43)	123.7 (4.87)	109.0 (4.29)	120.7 (4.75)	155.2 (6.11)	150.4 (5.92)	166.4 (6.55)	112.8 (4.44)	128.3 (5.05)	106.2 (4.18)	128.5 (5.06)	1,573.8 (61.96)
Source: NOAA

== Demographics ==
Historical population
Census	Pop.	Note	%±
1910	574		—
1920	500		−12.9%
1930	1,002		100.4%
1940	1,233		23.1%
1950	2,053		66.5%
1960	5,991		191.8%
1970	6,752		12.7%
1980	8,563		26.8%
1990	8,381		−2.1%
2000	8,757		4.5%
2010	10,215		16.6%
2020	9,286		−9.1%
2025 (est.)	9,378	▲	1.0%
U.S. Decennial Census

=== Racial and ethnic composition ===
Denham Springs city, Louisiana – Racial and ethnic composition Note: the US Census treats Hispanic/Latino as an ethnic category. This table excludes Latinos from the racial categories and assigns them to a separate category. Hispanics/Latinos may be of any race.
Race / Ethnicity (NH = Non-Hispanic)	Pop 2000	Pop 2010	Pop 2020	% 2000	% 2010	% 2020
White alone (NH)	7,348	8,099	6,618	83.91%	79.29%	71.27%
Black or African American alone (NH)	1,162	1,509	1,513	13.27%	14.77%	16.29%
Native American or Alaska Native alone (NH)	21	36	28	0.24%	0.35%	0.30%
Asian alone (NH)	59	54	121	0.67%	0.53%	1.30%
Native Hawaiian or Pacific Islander alone (NH)	7	3	2	0.08%	0.03%	0.02%
Other race alone (NH)	3	5	43	0.03%	0.05%	0.46%
Mixed race or Multiracial (NH)	79	87	343	0.90%	0.85%	3.69%
Hispanic or Latino (any race)	78	422	618	0.89%	4.13%	6.66%
Total	8,757	10,215	9,286	100.00%	100.00%	100.00%

=== 2020 census ===
As of the 2020 United States census, there were 9,286 people, 3,615 households, and 2,256 families residing in the city. According to the 2019 American Community Survey, the racial and ethnic makeup was 81.6% non-Hispanic white, 13.9% Black and African American, 0.2% American Indian and Alaska Native, 0.2% some other race, 0.5% two or more races, and 3.6% Hispanic and Latin American of any race. The median household income was $53,435 and 8.9% of the population lived at or below the poverty line.

== Government ==
Denham Springs is run under a Mayor-council form of government. The current mayor, Gerard Landry, has been in office since 2014, being reelected in 2018 after support from the city in his recovery efforts after the flood of 2016.

The Denham Springs City Council is a Unicameral council governing the City of Denham Springs. The five member council is elected directly by popular vote. Each council member serves the entire Denham Springs community. No neighborhoods elect representatives. Members serve a term of four years. Each city council member serves as a member of one of several city groups. This includes the Denham Springs Economic Development District, The Denham Springs Sewage District No. 1, Springs at Riverside Landing Economic Development District, and Finance Committee.

The city council meets twice monthly at 6 PM on the second Tuesday and fourth Monday of the month at the Municipal building in Denham Springs' Historic District.

== Education ==
Denham Springs is within the Livingston Parish Public Schools system.

=== High schools ===
- Denham Springs High School
- Denham Springs Freshman High School

=== Junior high schools ===
- Denham Springs Junior High School
- Southside Junior High School
- Juban Parc Junior High School

=== Elementary schools ===
- Denham Springs Elementary School
- Freshwater Elementary School
- Juban Parc Elementary School
- Lewis Vincent Elementary School
- Southside Elementary School

== Notable people ==
- Valarie Hodges (born 1955), businesswoman and Republican member of the Louisiana House of Representatives
- Jefferson D. Hughes, III, associate justice of the Louisiana Supreme Court since 2013, reared in Denham Springs
- Rosalie "Lady Tambourine" Washington (born 1957), gospel musician and tambourine player
- Robert Pete Williams (1914-1980), blues musician, in 1958 was released from the Louisiana State Penitentiary into servitude parole in Denham Springs
