= Beth Mizell =

American politician

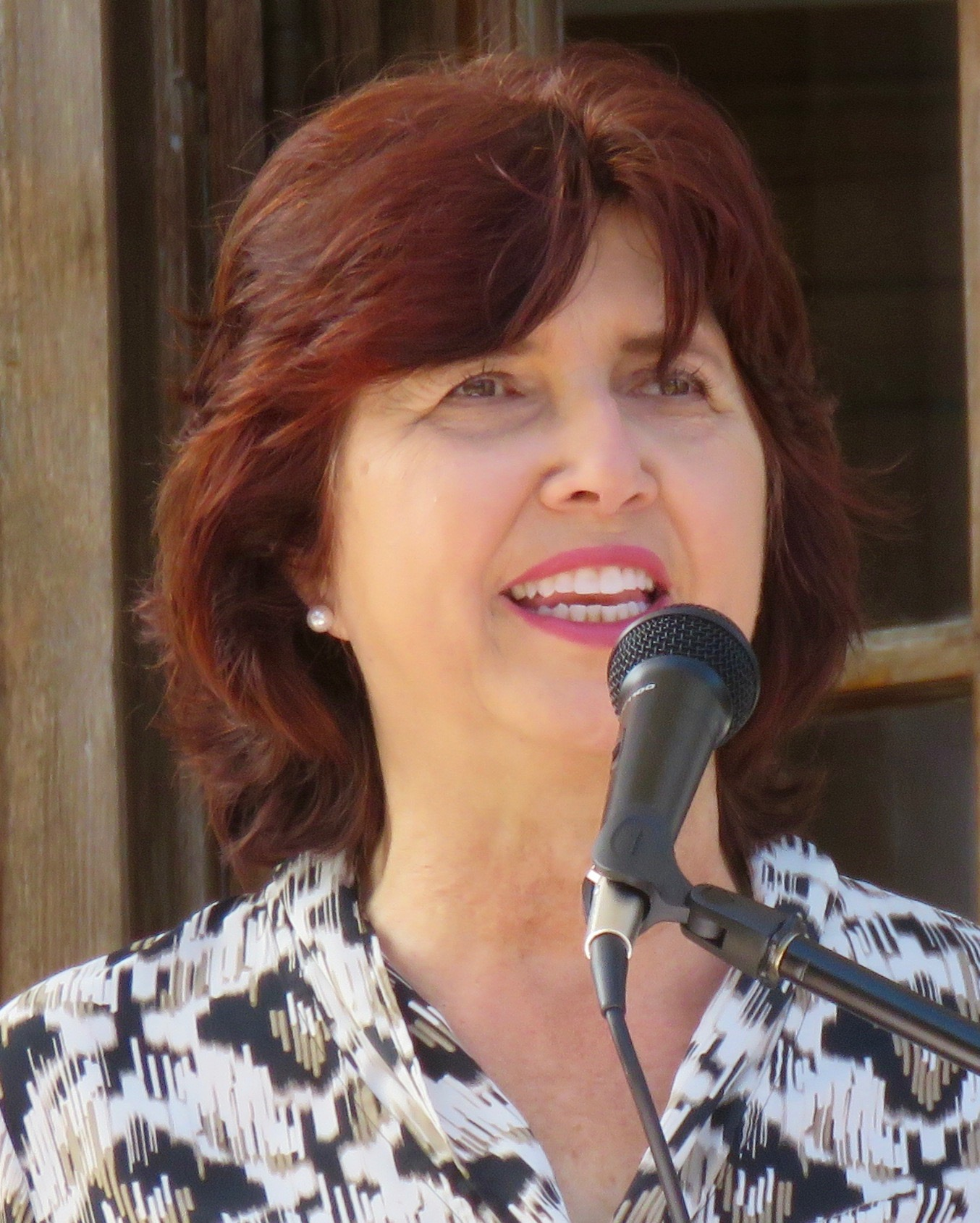

President pro tempore of the Louisiana Senate
- In office January 13, 2020 – January 8, 2024
- Preceded by: Gerald Long
- Succeeded by: Regina Barrow

Member of the Louisiana Senate from the 12th district
- Incumbent
- Assumed office January 11, 2016
- Preceded by: Ben Nevers

Personal details
- Born: Mary Beth Sherman; January 1952 (age 74) Bogalusa, Louisiana, U.S.
- Party: Republican

Mary Beth Sherman Mizell (born January 1952) is an American businesswoman from Franklinton, Louisiana, who is a Republican member of the Louisiana State Senate for District 12, which encompasses the parishes of St. Tammany, Tangipahoa, and Washington, part of the Florida Parishes of southeastern Louisiana. On January 11, 2016, she succeeded the term-limited Democrat Ben Nevers.

== Background ==
Mizell was married to James Robert "Bob" Mizell for forty-one years before he died from cancer in 2012. Mizell has two children, Julie Mizell Stewart, a teacher, and Joshua Mizell, a veteran of the U.S. Marine Corps.

== Political life ==
Mizell won the state Senate position in the general election held on November 21, 2015, when she defeated the Democrat Mickey Murphy, 19,404 votes (58 percent) to 14,033 (42 percent), a former teacher and college dean. In 2011, Mizell had a strong showing for the Senate against Ben Nevers, but ultimately lost. She finished with 14,764 votes (49.4 percent) to his 15,116 (50.6 percent).

In the 2015 campaign, Murphy supported the establishment of a reservoir in Senate District 12, but Mizell voiced her opposition to the project on the grounds that it would require eminent domain of private land in violation of the wishes of many of the impacted property owners.

Mizell was earlier an organizer of the Franklinton Tea Party movement and has been the president of Republican Women of Franklinton.

Mizell sits on the Senate committees on (1) Education, (2) Retirement, (3) Commerce, Consumer Protection, and International Affairs. She is also the vice chair of the select committees of: (1) Vocational and Technical Education and (2) Women and Children. The NRA Political Victory Fund rated Mizell 86 percent in 2015, based on her campaign promises.

In March 2016, Mizell joined eight other Republican state senators and Democrat John Milkovich of Caddo Parish to oppose the bipartisan majority backing a one-cent increase in the state sales tax for a five-year period. Senators voted 29–10 for the tax hike, a part of the revenue-raising measures pushed by Governor John Bel Edwards. A House and Senate conference committee subsequently trimmed the five years to twenty-seven months, effective from April 1, 2016 to June 30, 2018. Under this tax hike, the sale of religious publications and cookies became taxable.

Mizell submitted legislation to create a state historical protection commission. Her action is a response to the pending dismantling of Confederate monuments in New Orleans. However, her measure was doomed before the Senate Governmental Affairs Committee, where five African-American Democratic senators, led by committee chairman Karen Carter Peterson, hold the majority vote.

In April, 2018, Mizell was one of 10 senators who voted against criminalizing sexual abuse of animals. Despite Mizell's opposition, the bill passed with 25 votes in favor of the ban. After the bill was amended in the House, Mizell and the other dissenting Senators voted for final passage of the amended bill.

Louisiana State Senate
Preceded by Ben Nevers	Member of the Louisiana Senate from the 12th district 2016–present	Incumbent
Preceded by Gerald Long	President pro tempore of the Louisiana Senate; 2020–2024	Succeeded by Regina Barrow
