= Bogue Chitto State Park =

State park in Louisiana, United States

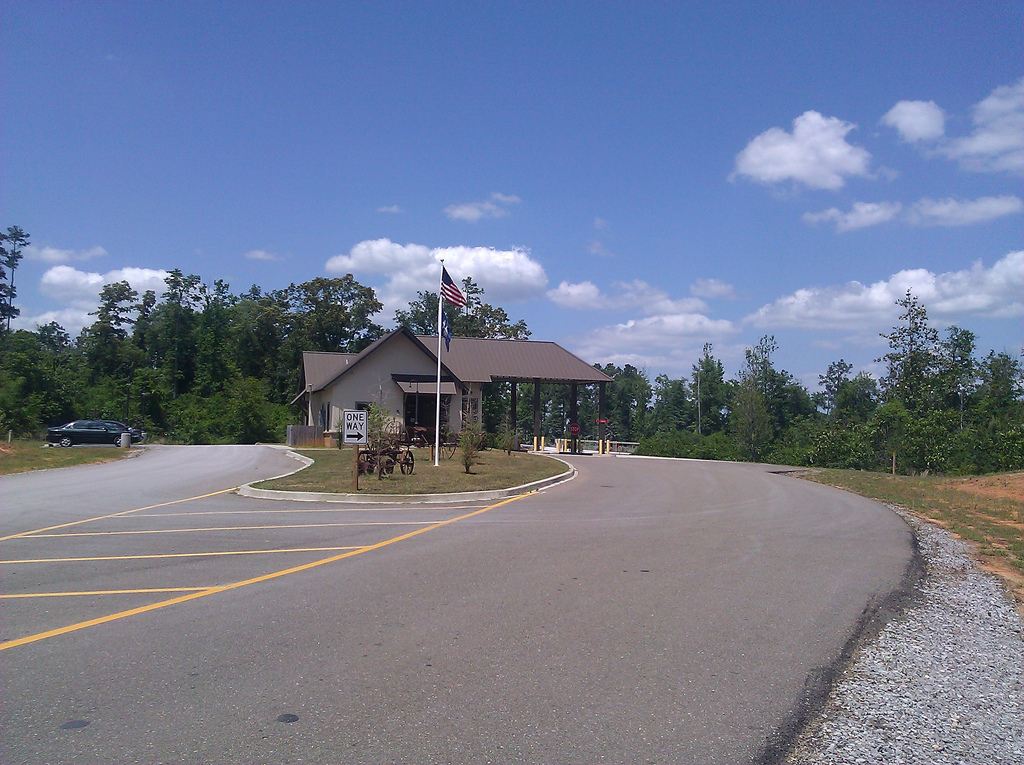
- An entrance area controls visitors to the park.

- Location within Louisiana
- Location: Washington Parish, Louisiana, United States of America
- Coordinates: 30.767527983°N 90.1573070°W
- Area: 1,786 acres (7.23 km^{2}; 2.791 sq mi)
- Established: August 28, 2010
- Visitors: 116,123 (in 2022)
- Governing body: Louisiana Office of State Parks
- Website: Official website

Bogue Chitto State Park (pronounced bo-guh chit-uh) is a Louisiana state park located off Louisiana State Highway 25 south of Franklinton, in Washington Parish. The name Bogue Chitto is from the Choctaw language, bok chito, meaning big creek. Bogue Chitto is a relatively recent addition to the Louisiana State Park system. It opened to the public on August 28, 2010, after a delay of approximately three months.

Bogue Chitto State Park has a visitors center, a conference room, picnic pavilions, and a lodge overlooking a 90-foot (27 m) bluff. Guests may stay at one of four upland cabins or park among the 81 recreational-vehicle (RV) sites. A group camp may be reserved for overnight visitors, as well. There is a canoe launch into the Bogue Chitto River, fishing piers, an amphitheater, and a water playground. The site contains eleven lakes stocked with freshwater fish. There are more than 7 miles (11 km) of nature trails and 14 miles (23 km) of equestrian trails. Bogue Chitto is also home to a moderately difficult 18 hole disc golf course, winding through hilly wooded terrain.

The state park is 1,786 acres (7.23 km^{2}) in size. Notable physical features are small streams, cypress-tupelo swamps, and both upland and bottomland hardwood forests. Of particular interest is a gorge known as Fricke's Cave, which contains delicate sandstone formations.

The park's address is 17049 State Park Boulevard, Franklinton, Louisiana.

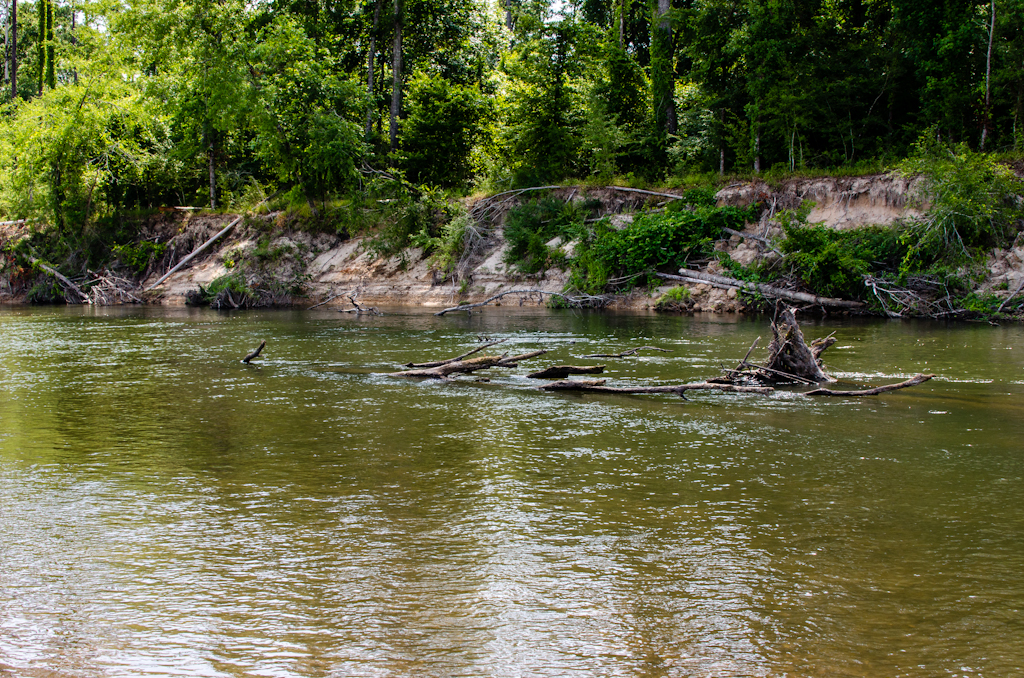
A river in the park

== See also ==
- List of Louisiana state parks
