= B.B. Rayburn Correctional Center =

Prison in Louisiana, United States

Coordinates: 30°55′21″N 89°48′58″W

B.B. Rayburn Correctional Center (BBRCC)
- Interactive map of B.B. Rayburn Correctional Center (BBRCC)
- Location: Washington Parish, Louisiana
- Status: open
- Capacity: 1,132
- Opened: 1982
- Warden: Keith Bickham
- Website: Official website

B.B. "Sixty" Rayburn Correctional Center is a Louisiana Department of Public Safety and Corrections prison for men in unincorporated Washington Parish, Louisiana, near Angie.

== History ==
The facility was originally named the Washington Correctional Institute (WCI). Construction began in 1982, and it began receiving prisoners in 1983. On August 31, 2006, it was renamed after B.B. "Sixty" Rayburn, a Louisiana state senator.
