= Jerry Thomas (Louisiana politician) =

American politician (1953–2023)

Member of the Louisiana House of Representatives
- In office 1988–1998

Member of the Louisiana State Senate
- In office 1999–2004

Personal details
- Born: Jerry Aroe Thomas; May 22, 1953 Louisiana, U.S.
- Died: September 26, 2023 (aged 70) Thomas, Louisiana, U.S.
- Party: Democratic; Republican
- Education: Southeastern Louisiana University; Louisiana State University Health Sciences Center New Orleans

Jerry Aroe Thomas (May 22, 1953 – September 26, 2023) was an American politician. A member of the Democratic Party and the Republican Party, he served in the Louisiana House of Representatives from 1988 to 1998 and in the Louisiana State Senate from 1999 to 2004.

== Life and career ==
Thomas was born in Louisiana, the son of Aroe Thomas and Frances Nelline. He attended Southeastern Louisiana University, graduating in 1974. After graduating, he attended Louisiana State University Health Sciences Center New Orleans, earning his M.D. degree in 1979, which after earning his degree, he served as a major general in the Louisiana Army National Guard.

Thomas served in the Louisiana House of Representatives from 1988 to 1998. After his service in the House, he then served in the Louisiana State Senate from 1999 to 2004.

== Death ==
Thomas died on September 26, 2023, in Thomas, Louisiana, at the age of 70.
