= Bogue Chitto River =

River in the United States of America

Bogue Chitto River Barrio del Buck Chitto, Bogachito River, Bogue Chito
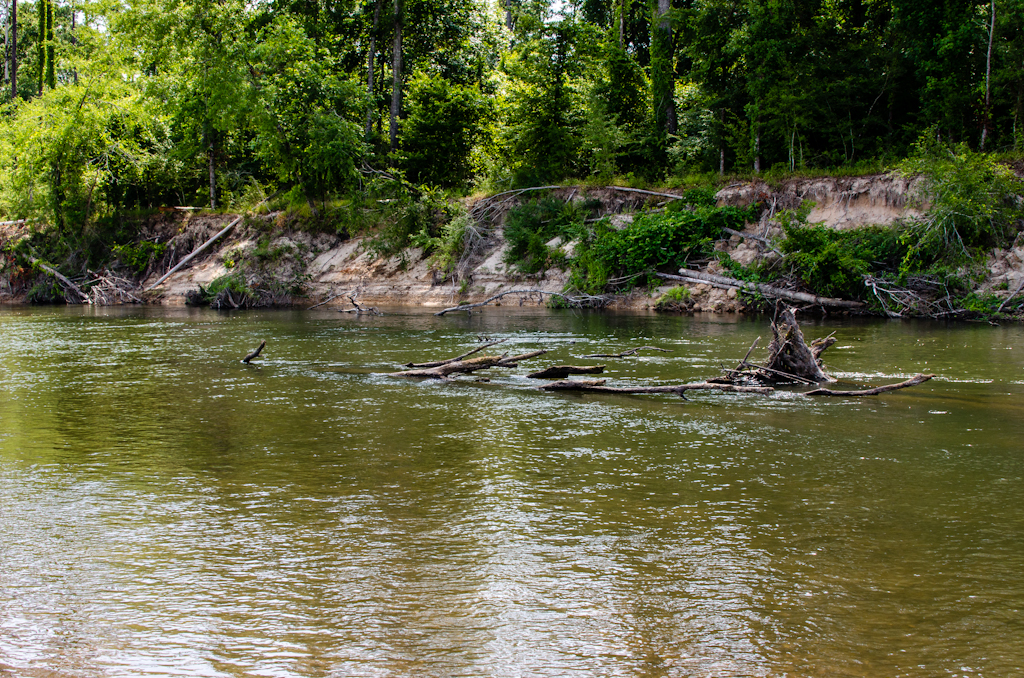
- Bogue Chitto River in Bogue Chitto State Park, Washington Parish, Louisiana
- Bogue Chitto River
- Etymology: "Big creek" in Choctaw language

Location
- Country: United States
- States: Mississippi; Louisiana
- Counties: Lincoln; Pike; Walthall
- Parishes: Washington; St. Tammany

Physical characteristics
- Mouth
  - location: Pearl River
  - coordinates: 30°33′56″N 89°49′37″W

Basin features
- Cities: Brookhaven, Mississippi; Franklinton, Louisiana

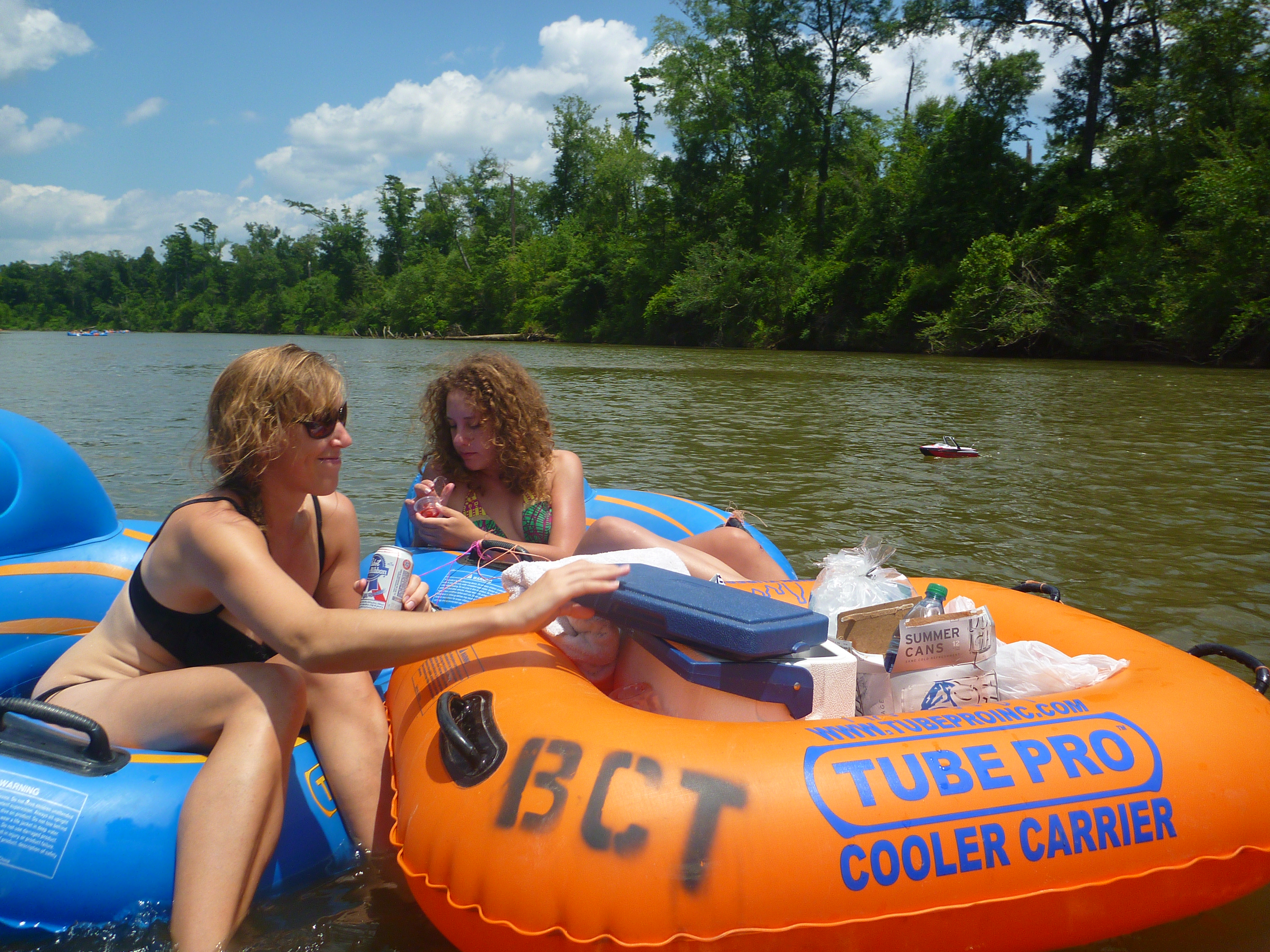
Floating with supplies on the Bogue Chitto, Louisiana

The Bogue Chitto River is a stream in the U.S. states of Louisiana and Mississippi. It is a tributary of the Pearl River. The Bogue Chitto joins the Pearl River twenty miles inland.

The river passes through the Bogue Chitto State Park in Washington Parish, Louisiana where canoe launches are available.

Bogue Chitto is a name derived from the Choctaw language meaning "big creek". Variant names are "Barrio del Buck Chitto", "Bogachito River", and "Bogue Chito".
