= 2026 in Louisiana =

- Decades: 2000s; 2010s; 2020s
- See also: History of Louisiana; Historical outline of Louisiana; List of years in Louisiana; 2026 in the United States

The following is a list of events of the year 2026 in Louisiana.

== Incumbents ==
=== State government ===
- Governor: Jeff Landry (R)

== Events ==
=== January ===
- January 30 – Eight inmates escape from the Riverbend Detention Center in Lake Providence. They are captured less than 24 hours later.
- January 31 – Five people, including a 6-year-old, are wounded in a shooting at the Mardi Gras parade in Clinton.

=== February ===
- February 17 – Actor Shia LaBeouf is arrested in New Orleans for allegedly punching a man amid Mardi Gras celebrations.
- February 20 – The Fifth Circuit votes 12–6 to lift the injunction on House Bill 71 (Louisiana Ten Commandments in classrooms law), on the grounds that it was premature to decide the law's constitutionality before it had been enacted.

=== March ===
- March 2 – The Louisiana National Guard announces that 120 troops will remain deployed in New Orleans through August.
- March 23 – Immigration and Customs Enforcement agents are deployed to 14 airports nationwide, including Louis Armstrong New Orleans International Airport.

=== April ===
- April 4 – A driver strikes a crowd of people at a Lao New Year parade in New Iberia, injuring 15 people.
- April 14 – A Tesla dealership in New Orleans is damaged in a Molotov cocktail attack.
- April 18 – A man kills seven of his children and an eighth child in a series of shootings in Shreveport. Four people are injured, including two by gunfire. The shooter is killed by police in Bossier City.
- April 23 – A 17-year-old girl is killed and five people injured in a shooting at the Mall of Louisiana in Baton Rouge.
- April 29
  - Louisiana v. Callais: The United States Supreme Court in a 6–3 decision along ideological lines, rules that Louisiana's new redistricting map was an unconstitutional racial gerrymander under the Fifteenth Amendment.
  - Orleans Parish Sheriff Susan Hutson is indicted on 14 charges, including criminal corruption and obstruction. The charges are related to a 2025 jailbreak in which ten inmates escaped custody.
- April 30 – Governor Landry signs a bill that consolidates and cuts several positions from the New Orleans judicial system. Among the positions cut is the criminal court clerk; wrongfully-convicted man Calvin Duncan was set to begin the role on May 4 after winning the election in 2025.

=== May ===
- May 3 – A judge grants a request by Calvin Duncan to halt the bill from April 30, allowing him to take office the next day. However, on the morning of May 4, a higher court judge freezes the earlier order after an appeal by the state.
- May 16 – U.S. Senator Bill Cassidy, who had voted to convict Trump during his second impeachment trial, loses the Republican primary for his seat, receiving 24.8% of the vote behind Trump-endorsed U.S. Representative Julia Letlow's 44.8% and Louisiana treasurer John Fleming's 28.3%. Letlow and Fleming will advance to a runoff.

=== June ===
- June 23 – In Landor v. Louisiana Department of Corrections and Public Safety, the Supreme Court rules that a Rastafari inmate whose dreadlocks were forcibly cut off by prison guards cannot sue prison officials for monetary damages.

=== July ===
- July 2 – Attorney General Liz Murrill is indicted in New Orleans on eight counts of public intimidation. The charges stem from Murrill telling eight elected officials, including Mayor Helena Moreno and District Attorney Jason Williams, that they could lose their jobs if they opposed the law that eliminated Calvin Duncan's clerk position.
- July 22 – Charges against Murrill are dropped at the request of Moreno and other politicians involved.

=== August ===
- August 27 – Far-right commentator Milo Yiannopoulos, a British national, is arrested by immigration officials at Louis Armstrong New Orleans International Airport.

=== September ===
- September 13 – Four people are stabbed to death at a home near Houma. A suspect is arrested.

=== November ===
- November 3:
  - 2026 Shreveport mayoral election
  - 2026 United States House of Representatives elections in Louisiana
  - 2026 United States Senate election in Louisiana: Representative Julia Letlow wins election, beating Democratic opponent Jamie Davis.
- November 13 – A tanker ship collides with a cruise ship on the Mississippi River in New Orleans, causing the cruise ship to sink. 32 people are treated for minor injuries, but all 129 passengers and crew survive the sinking.

== Deaths ==
- May 3: Lee Allen Zeno, 71, bassist.

== See also ==
- 2026 in the United States
