= 2026 Louisiana elections =

United States elections

- November 3, 2026

The 2026 Louisiana elections are being held in the U.S. state of Louisiana during 2026 as part of the 2026 United States elections. Party primaries were held on May 16, with primary runoffs on June 27. The U.S. Senate general election and open primaries for the U.S. House of Representatives and other offices were held on November 3. Runoffs for contests using the open primary system are scheduled for December 12.

Republican Julia Letlow won the U.S. Senate election. Four incumbent U.S. representatives won re-election, and the 5th and 6th congressional districts advanced to runoffs. Voters approved seven of the ten constitutional amendments on the November ballot.

== Voter participation ==
=== Early voting ===
Early in-person voting for the November 3 election took place from October 20 through October 27, 2026, excluding Sunday, October 25.

The Louisiana secretary of state's statistical report covering voting through October 27 recorded 520,942 voters, including 448,525 who voted early in person and 72,417 absentee voters. By voter registration affiliation, 221,066 were Democrats, 205,085 were Republicans, 92,922 had no party affiliation, and 1,869 were registered with other parties.

=== November 3 turnout ===
Preliminary figures from the Louisiana secretary of state's office put statewide turnout for the November 3 election at about 50%, with about 1.5 million voters casting ballots.

== Federal ==
=== U.S. House of Representatives ===
All six of Louisiana's seats in the United States House of Representatives were up for election to two-year terms. The elections used an open primary on November 3, with runoffs scheduled for December 12 in races where no candidate received a majority.

The House party primaries originally scheduled for May 16 and June 27 were canceled under Act 7 of the 2026 legislative session, and the races were moved to the fall open primary cycle.

The cancellation followed the U.S. Supreme Court's April 29 ruling in Louisiana v. Callais, which upheld a lower court ruling that Louisiana's previous congressional map was an unconstitutional racial gerrymander. Louisiana enacted a new congressional map on May 29, reducing the number of majority-Black districts from two to one.

Four incumbents won re-election on November 3. Republican Steve Scalise won in the 1st district, Democrat Troy Carter in the 2nd, Republican Clay Higgins in the 3rd, and Republican Mike Johnson in the 4th.

Democrat Pat Moore and Republican Gabe Firment advanced to the December 12 runoff in the 5th district. Democrat Chauna Banks and Republican Blake Miguez advanced to the runoff in the 6th district.

=== U.S. Senate ===
Incumbent Republican senator Bill Cassidy sought re-election to a third term. Cassidy's vote to convict Donald Trump in his second impeachment trial led to primary challenges against him.

Cassidy finished third in the May 16 Republican primary and was eliminated. Representative Julia Letlow defeated state treasurer John Fleming in the June 27 Republican runoff, while Democrat Jamie Davis defeated Gary Crockett in his party's runoff. The November 3 general election used plurality voting, without a December runoff.

Letlow defeated Davis in the general election, receiving 745,963 votes (50.9%) to Davis's 720,106 (49.1%) in the unofficial returns.

== Executive ==
=== Public Service Commission ===
Two of the five seats on the Louisiana Public Service Commission were up for election on November 3. Republicans held a 3–2 majority on the commission heading into the election. Republican Eric Skrmetta in District 1 and Democrat Foster Campbell in District 5 were ineligible for re-election because of term limits.

In District 1, Republican state representative Stephanie Hilferty defeated John Young in the June 27 primary runoff. She won the general election against Democrat Connie Norris and Chris Justin, who had no party affiliation.

In District 5, Republican nominee John Atkins, a Caddo Parish commissioner, defeated Democratic nominee James Green, a Shreveport city council member. The results will give Republicans a 4–1 majority when the new commissioners take office in January 2027.

=== Board of Elementary and Secondary Education (special) ===
A special election was held on November 3 for the District 1 seat on the Louisiana Board of Elementary and Secondary Education. The vacancy followed Paul Hollis's departure to become director of the United States Mint. Governor Jeff Landry appointed former U.S. representative Joseph Cao to the board.

Cao defeated Ellie Schroder in the June 27 Republican primary runoff and faced Democratic nominee Angela Hershey, a retired teacher who advanced unopposed, in the general election.

Cao defeated Hershey with 63% of the vote and was elected to serve the remainder of Hollis's term, which ends in 2028.

== State legislature ==
On February 7, Republican Reese Broussard won the special election for District 37 of the Louisiana House of Representatives, and Democrats Chasity Verret Martinez and Ed Murray won in Districts 60 and 97, respectively.

On March 14, Democrats Sidney Barthelemy II and Dana Henry won runoffs in Louisiana State Senate District 3 and House District 100, respectively. Republican Paul Sawyer won the special primary for House District 69 outright. Republican Doyle Boudreaux was elected unopposed in House District 39.

On November 3, Democrat Gregory Carroll won the special election for House District 92 outright with 57.6% of the vote. He was elected to succeed Republican Joe Stagni, who resigned after his election to the Kenner City Council.

A special primary for Senate District 14 is scheduled for December 12 following the death of Democratic senator Larry Selders. U.S. representative Cleo Fields, a Democrat, and unaffiliated candidate Joel Porter qualified for the election.

== Judicial ==
=== Louisiana Supreme Court ===
Three of the court's seven seats were up for election in 2026. Republican incumbents Cade Cole in District 3 and Jay McCallum in District 4 were elected unopposed.

In the District 1 special election, Republican William "Billy" Burris defeated First Circuit Court of Appeal judge Blair Downing Edwards in the May 16 primary. The seat had become vacant when William J. Crain left to become a federal judge. Burris faced no general election opponent. The November 3 general elections for all three seats were canceled.

== Ballot measures ==
=== May 16 ===
Five constitutional amendments appeared on the May 16 ballot:

- Amendment 1: Legislative control over adding and removing unclassified state civil service positions.
- Amendment 2: Parish-equivalent school funding and taxing authority for the St. George community school system.
- Amendment 3: Use of education funds to reduce teacher retirement debt and finance teacher and support staff raises.
- Amendment 4: Optional parish tax relief for business inventory and changes to property classifications.
- Amendment 5: Raising the mandatory judicial retirement age from 70 to 75.

Voters rejected all five amendments.

=== November 3 ===
Ten constitutional amendments were on the November 3 ballot:

- Amendment 1: A one-time transfer of a disabled veteran's surviving spouse's additional property tax exemption to another qualifying home.
- Amendment 2: Preservation of previously authorized local property tax millage limits when lower rates are levied.
- Amendment 3: Prohibition of post-conviction bail for specified aggravated offenses against minors.
- Amendment 4: A lifetime restriction on gubernatorial reelection after serving more than one and a half terms.
- Amendment 5: Flexibility in applying nonrecurring state funds to unfunded retirement liabilities.
- Amendment 6: Additional local property tax exemptions for qualifying homeowners aged 65 and older.
- Amendment 7: Public spending on certain drinking water service lines on private property.
- Amendment 8: Prohibition of property expropriation by foreign adversaries and their agents.
- Amendment 9: A $150,000 income ceiling for eligibility for the special property assessment level.
- Amendment 10: Property tax exemptions for rehabilitated blighted or derelict properties.

Amendments 2, 5, and 10 failed, with all others passing.

== Local ==
In the 2026 Shreveport mayoral election, incumbent Republican mayor Tom Arceneaux and Democratic Caddo Parish commissioner Stormy Gage-Watts advanced from the November 3 primary to a December 12 runoff.
