= 2027 Louisiana gubernatorial election =

- October 9, 2027
Incumbent Governor
Jeff Landry
Republican

The 2027 Louisiana gubernatorial election will be held on October 9, 2027, to elect the governor of Louisiana. If no candidate receives a majority in the primary, a runoff between the top two finishers will be held on November 20. Republican incumbent Jeff Landry is eligible to seek a second term.

== Candidates ==
=== Republican Party ===
==== Potential ====
- John Fleming, state treasurer (2024–present), former U.S. representative from Louisiana's 4th congressional district (2009–2017), and candidate for U.S. Senate in 2016 and 2026
- Garret Graves, former U.S. representative from Louisiana's 6th congressional district (2015–2025)
- Jeff Landry, incumbent governor (2024–present)
- Billy Nungesser, lieutenant governor of Louisiana (2016–present)

==== Declined ====
- Bill Cassidy, U.S. senator (2015–present)

=== Democratic Party ===
==== Declared ====
- Gary Crockett, data scientist and candidate for U.S. Senate in 2026

==== Publicly expressed interest ====
- Jamie Davis, former Tensas Parish police juror, runner-up for Louisiana's 21st House of Representatives district in 2023, and nominee for U.S. Senate in 2026

==== Potential ====
- Troy Carter, U.S. representative from Louisiana's 2nd congressional district (2021–present)
- Dustin Granger, financial advisor and nominee for Louisiana State Treasurer in 2023
- Mitch Landrieu, former mayor of New Orleans (2010–2018)
- Davante Lewis, member of the Louisiana Public Service Commission from the 3rd district (2022–present)
- Jay Luneau, state senator from the 29th district (2016–present)
- Helena Moreno, mayor of New Orleans (2026–present)
- Gary Smith Jr., former state senator from the 19th district (2012–2024)
