= 2027 in Louisiana =

- Decades: 2000s; 2010s; 2020s
- See also: History of Louisiana; Historical outline of Louisiana; List of years in Louisiana; 2027 in the United States

The following is a list of events of the year 2027 in Louisiana.

== Events ==
=== Planned or predicted ===
- January 15 - 2027 Sugar Bowl
- November 20 -
  - 2027 Louisiana House of Representatives election
  - 2027 Louisiana State Senate election
  - 2027 Louisiana gubernatorial election
