= 2026 United States Senate election in Louisiana =

- November 3, 2026

Nominee	Julia Letlow	Jamie Davis
Party	Republican	Democratic
Popular vote	746,466	720,516
Percentage	50.88%	49.12%
- Letlow: 50–60% 60–70% 70–80% 80–90% >90% Davis: 50–60% 60–70% 70–80% 80–90% >90% Tie: 50% No votes
U.S. senator before election
Bill Cassidy
Republican
Elected U.S. senator
Julia Letlow
Republican

The 2026 United States Senate election in Louisiana was held on November 3, 2026, to elect a member of the United States Senate to represent the state of Louisiana. Republican representative Julia Letlow defeated Democratic Tensas Parish police juror Jamie Davis.

Considered vulnerable to a challenger after he voted to convict President Donald Trump in his second impeachment trial, two-term Republican incumbent Bill Cassidy received 24.8% of the vote in the May 16 primary behind Letlow's 44.8% and state treasurer John Fleming's 28.3%. Letlow, endorsed by Trump, advanced to a runoff against Fleming on June 27 and won the nomination with 56.9% of the vote. A Democratic runoff between Davis and political consultant Gary Crockett was held the same day, which Davis won with 79.9% of the vote. The race was the first Senate election in Louisiana to utilize party primaries instead of a single blanket primary since 2010.

Despite being considered by prognosticators to be a safely Republican race, Letlow won the election by an unexpectedly narrow margin of approximately two percentage points and a vote share of 50.9%. This was Louisiana's closest election for the U.S. Senate since 1996.

== Background ==
=== Change of electoral system ===
In January 2024, governor Jeff Landry signed House Bill 17, sponsored by representative Julie Emerson, which eliminated the top-two Louisiana primary system in favor of partisan primaries in elections for Congress, the Board of Elementary and Secondary Education, the Public Service Commission, and the state's Supreme Court. Unaffiliated voters may vote in the primaries, but not members of other parties, including the Independent Party of Louisiana. The bill also indicated the use of runoff elections if no candidate receives a majority in their respective primary. The law took effect beginning with the 2026 elections, making this election the first in which Louisiana elected a U.S. senator using this system since 2010; the top-two primary was first implemented in congressional elections in 1978.

=== Primary challenge to Cassidy ===
Senator Bill Cassidy, who has held this seat since 2015, gained notoriety within the Republican Party for his vocal criticism of President Donald Trump. Cassidy denounced the January 6 U.S. Capitol attack, accused participants of sedition, and voted to certify the 2020 election results. He was one of seven Senate Republicans who voted to convict Trump for incitement of insurrection during his second impeachment trial, prompting the Republican Party of Louisiana to censure him. During Trump's 2024 campaign, Cassidy publicly opposed his candidacy, citing Trump's four criminal indictments.

Cassidy's stance led analysts to view him as vulnerable to a pro-Trump primary challenge. Early speculation in 2024 included Congressman Clay Higgins, a supporter of Trump, who ultimately declined to run. On January 18, 2026, Trump endorsed Julia Letlow, who officially entered the race two days later.

== Republican primary ==
=== Candidates ===
==== Nominee ====
- Julia Letlow, U.S. representative from Louisiana's 5th congressional district (2021–present)

==== Eliminated in runoff ====
- John Fleming, state treasurer (2024–present), former U.S. representative from Louisiana's 4th congressional district (2009–2017), and candidate for U.S. Senate in 2016

==== Eliminated in primary ====
- Bill Cassidy, incumbent U.S. senator (2015–2027)
- Mark Spencer, businessman

==== Withdrawn ====
- Julie Emerson, former state representative from the 39th district (2016–2026)
- Blake Miguez, state senator from the 22nd district (2024–present) (running for U.S. House; endorsed Letlow)
- Kathy Seiden, St. Tammany Parish councilor (endorsed Letlow)
- Eric Skrmetta, member of the Louisiana Public Service Commission from the 1st district (2009–present) (endorsed Letlow)
- Sammy Wyatt, healthcare professional (running for LA-05)

==== Declined ====
- Clay Higgins, U.S. representative from Louisiana's 3rd congressional district (running for re-election; endorsed Letlow)

=== Endorsements ===
John Fleming

U.S. representatives

- Paul Gosar, AZ-09 (2011–present)
- Scott Perry, PA-10 (2013–2027)
- Marlin Stutzman, IN-03 (2010–2017, 2025–present)

State legislators

- Elbert Guillory, former SD-24 (2009–2016)
Julia Letlow

Executive branch officials

- Donald Trump, president of the United States (2017–2021, 2025–present)

Statewide officials

- Jeff Landry, governor of Louisiana (2024–present) and special envoy to Greenland (2025–present)
- Liz Murrill, attorney general of Louisiana (2024–present)
- Eric Skrmetta, member of the Louisiana Public Service Commission from the 1st district (2009–present) and former candidate for this seat

Local officials

- Kathy Seiden, St. Tammany Parish councilor and former candidate for this seat

Organizations

- AIPAC (co-endorsed with Cassidy)
- Maggie's List
Bill Cassidy (eliminated)

U.S. senators

- John Barrasso, Senate majority whip (2025–present) from Wyoming (2007–present)
- Tim Scott, South Carolina (2013–present)
- John Thune, Senate majority leader (2025–present) from South Dakota (2005–present)

State legislators

- Patrick Connick, SD-08 (2020–present)
- Beth Mizell, SD-12 (2016–present)

Individuals

- Drew Brees, former New Orleans Saints player
- Eddie Rispone, businessman and 2019 gubernatorial candidate

Organizations

- AIPAC (co-endorsed with Letlow)
- National Republican Senatorial Committee
- Susan B. Anthony Pro-Life America
Blake Miguez (withdrawn)

State legislators

- Roger Wilder, HD-71 (2024–present)

=== Fundraising ===
Italics indicated a withdrew, declined, or eliminated candidate.

Campaign finance reports as of April 26, 2026
Candidate	Raised	Spent	Cash on hand
Bill Cassidy (R)	$13,325,792	$9,446,800	$5,516,669
John Fleming (R)	$11,286,639	$9,897,447	$1,389,264
Julia Letlow (R)	$4,398,631	$2,785,529	$1,613,102
Source: Federal Election Commission

=== First round ===
==== Debates and forums ====
2026 Louisiana Republican Senate primary first round debates
No.	Date	Host	Moderators	Link	Participants			
P Participant A Absent N Non-invitee I Invitee W Withdrawn								
P Participant A Absent N Non-invitee I Invitee W Withdrawn					Cassidy	Fleming	Letlow	Spencer
1	May 5, 2026	KPEL-FM	Moon Griffon; Jeff Beimfohr	Facebook	A	P	P	N

==== Polling ====
Aggregate polls

Source of poll aggregation	Dates administered	Dates updated	Bill Cassidy	John Fleming	Julia Letlow	Other/ Undecided (Note: Calculated by taking the difference of 100% and all other candidates combined.)	Margin
270toWin	April 30 – May 8, 2026	May 10, 2026	20.5%	29.0%	34.5%	16.0% (Note: Mark Spencer with 2.0%)	Letlow +5.5%
FiftyPlusOne	through May 7, 2026	May 10, 2026	23.0%	24.6%	32.1%	20.3%	Letlow +7.5%
Average			21.8%	26.8%	33.3%	18.1%	Letlow +6.5%

Poll source	Date(s) administered	Sample size (Note: Key: A – all adults RV – registered voters LV – likely voters V – unclear)	Margin of error	Bill Cassidy	John Fleming	Julia Letlow	Mark Spencer	Other	Undecided
Quantus Insights (R)	May 6–7, 2026	1,015 (LV)	± 3.0%	20%	30%	42%	2%	–	12%
Fabrizio, Lee & Associates (R) (Note: Poll sponsored the Accountability Project PAC, which supports Letlow)	May 4–5, 2026	600 (LV)	± 4.0%	26%	21%	32%	1%	–	19%
BDPC (Note: Poll commissioned by lobbyist Alton Ashy, who supports Letlow)	April 28–30, 2026	600 (LV)	–	21%	21%	33%	2%	–	23%
Emerson College	April 24–26, 2026	500 (LV)	± 4.3%	21%	28%	27%	2%	–	22%
American Pulse Research & Polling	March 20–24, 2026	455 (LV)	± 4.6%	21%	25%	31%	–	–	23%
Harris, DeVille & Associates	March 13–19, 2026	683 (LV)	–	45%	21%	34%	–	–	–
BDPC	March 16–17, 2026	600 (LV)	–	20%	24%	29%	–	–	27%
Fabrizio, Lee & Associates (R)	March 11–12, 2026	600 (LV)	± 4.0%	26%	19%	27%	1%	–	27%
Public Opinion Strategies (R) (Note: Poll sponsored by Cassidy's campaign)	March 7–10, 2026	500 (LV)	–	35%	21%	24%	2%	–	18%
BDPC	February 21–23, 2026	600 (LV)	–	28%	21%	21%	–	–	30%
Quantus Insights (R)	February 23–24, 2026	1,428 (LV)	± 2.8%	20%	34%	25%	–	–	21%
Cor Strategies (R) (Note: Poll sponsored by the Pelican Institute)	February 20–24, 2026	– (V)	–	30%	17%	15%	7%	7%	24%
JMC Analytics & Polling (Note: Poll sponsored by Fleming's campaign)	February 14–16, 2026	645 (LV)	± 3.9%	22%	26%	25%	1%	–	26%

Hypothetical polling

Poll source	Date(s) administered	Sample size	Margin of error	Bill Cassidy	John Fleming	Julia Letlow	Blake Miguez	Eric Skrmetta	Other	Undecided
	February 13, 2026	Skrmetta withdraws								
	February 3, 2026	Miguez withdraws, runs for Letlow's House seat								
BDPC	January 20–22, 2026	600 (LV)	–	21%	14%	27%	5%	–	6% (Note: "Other candidates" with 6%)	27%
Public Opinion Strategies (R)	January 20–22, 2026	600 (LV)	–	32%	16%	21%	9%	1%	0% (Note: Kathy Seiden with 0%)	19%
	January 20, 2026	Letlow enters the race								
JMC Analytics & Polling	January 12–14, 2026	650 (LV)	± 3.8%	22%	23%	–	–	–	16% (Note: "The remaining ballot tested candidates are getting a combined vote of 16%")	39%
JMC Analytics & Polling	October 15–17, 2025	610 (LV)	± 4.0%	23%	25%	–	–	–	17% (Note: "Includes five candidates, either announced or anticipated")	35%
Ragnar Research Partners (R)	April 14–16, 2025	600 (LV)	± 4.0%	45%	28%	–	–	–	3% (Note: Randall Arrington with 3%)	34%
JMC Analytics & Polling	February 24–26, 2025	600 (LV)	± 4.0%	27%	29%	–	6%	2%	–	36%

Poll source	Date(s) administered	Sample size	Margin of error	Bill Cassidy	Clay Higgins	John Fleming	Julia Letlow	Blake Miguez	Undecided
Trafalgar Group (R) (Note: Poll conducted on behalf of Clay Higgins)	March 6–10, 2025	1,068 (LV)	± 2.9%	24%	31%	17%	20%	4%	4%
Trafalgar Group (R)	March 6–10, 2025	1,068 (LV)	± 2.9%	28%	39%	25%	–	3%	5%
Trafalgar Group (R)	March 6–10, 2025	1,068 (LV)	± 2.9%	28%	42%	25%	–	–	5%
Trafalgar Group (R)	March 6–10, 2025	1,068 (LV)	± 2.9%	32%	61%	–	–	–	7%
Trafalgar Group (R)	March 6–10, 2025	1,068 (LV)	± 2.9%	37%	–	–	–	42%	21%

Poll source	Date(s) administered	Sample size	Margin of error	Bill Cassidy	Clay Higgins	John Fleming	Garret Graves	Eric Skrmetta	Undecided
Trafalgar Group (R)	August 12–14, 2024	1,062 (LV)	± 2.9%	27%	36%	12%	23%	2%	–
Trafalgar Group (R)	August 12–14, 2024	1,062 (LV)	± 2.9%	36%	44%	16%	–	4%	–
Trafalgar Group (R)	August 12–14, 2024	1,062 (LV)	± 2.9%	–	45%	22%	29%	4%	–
Trafalgar Group (R)	August 12–14, 2024	1,062 (LV)	± 2.9%	41%	–	–	59%	–	–
Trafalgar Group (R)	August 12–14, 2024	1,062 (LV)	± 2.9%	43%	57%	–	–	–	–
Trafalgar Group (R)	August 12–14, 2024	1,062 (LV)	± 2.9%	–	56%	–	44%	–	–

==== Results ====
Parish results Letlow: 30–40%; 40–50%; 50–60%; 60–70%; 70–80%; Fleming: 40–50%; Cassidy: 30–40%; 40–50%; 60–70%

Congressional district results Letlow: 40–50%

Precinct results Letlow: 30–40%; 40–50%; 50–60%; 60–70%; 70–80%; 80–90%; 90–100%; Fleming: 30–40%; 40–50%; 50–60%; 60–70%; 70–80%; 80–90%; 90–100%; Cassidy: 20–30%; 30–40%; 40–50%; 50–60%; 60–70%; 70–80%; 80–90%; 90–100%; Spencer: 50–60%; 90–100%; No data

Republican primary results
Party	Candidate	Votes	%
Republican	Julia Letlow	179,903	44.8
Republican	John Fleming	113,437	28.3
Republican	Bill Cassidy (incumbent)	99,496	24.8
Republican	Mark Spencer	8,338	2.1
Total votes		401,174	100.0

=== Runoff ===
==== Endorsements ====
Julia Letlow

U.S. senators

- Tim Sheehy, Montana (2025–present)
- Katie Britt, Alabama (2023–present)
- Jim Banks, Indiana (2025–present)
- Bernie Moreno, Ohio (2025–present)
- Rick Scott, Florida (2019–present)

U.S. representatives

- Clay Higgins, LA-03 (2017–present)
- Steve Scalise, House majority leader (2023–2027) from LA-01 (2008–present)

State legislators

- Phillip DeVillier, speaker of the House (2024–present) from HD-41 (2016–present)
- Cameron Henry, president of the Senate (2024–present) from HD-09 (2020–present)
- Jeremy Stine, Senate majority leader (2024–present) from HD-27 (2022–present)
- 40 other state representatives
- 12 other state senators

Organizations

- U.S. Chamber of Commerce

==== Fundraising ====
Campaign finance reports as of May 17, 2026
Candidate	Raised	Spent	Cash on hand
John Fleming (R)	$11,286,639	$9,897,447	$1,389,264
Julia Letlow (R)	$4,398,631	$2,785,529	$1,613,102
Source: Federal Election Commission

==== Polling ====
Poll source	Date(s) administered	Sample size	Margin of error	John Fleming	Julia Letlow	Undecided
Quantus Insights (R)	June 23–24, 2026	770 (LV)	± 3.7%	45%	48%	7%
JMC Analytics (R)	June 21–22, 2026	600 (LV)	± 4.0%	45%	40%	15%
BDPC	June 15–16, 2026	600 (LV)	–	38%	40%	22%
Kaplan Strategies (R)	May 24–26, 2026	850 (LV)	± 3.4%	37%	52%	10%
Harper Polling (R)	May 18–19, 2026	457 (LV)	± 4.6%	35%	52%	13%
JMC Analytics (R)	May 18–19, 2026	640 (LV)	± 3.9%	44%	45%	11%
	May 16, 2026	Fleming and Letlow advance to runoff				
Quantus Insights (R)	May 6–7, 2026	1,015 (LV)	± 3.0%	40%	45%	15%
BDPC	April 28–30, 2026	600 (LV)	–	31%	42%	27%
American Pulse Research & Polling	March 20–24, 2026	455 (LV)	± 4.6%	34%	37%	29%
BDPC	March 16–17, 2026	600 (LV)	–	33%	34%	33%
BDPC	February 21–23, 2026	600 (LV)	–	36%	27%	37%
Quantus Insights (R)	February 23–24, 2026	1,428 (LV)	± 2.8%	42%	32%	26%
JMC Analytics (R)	February 14–16, 2026	645 (LV)	± 3.9%	40%	31%	29%

Hypothetical runoff polling

Bill Cassidy vs. Julia Letlow

Poll source	Date(s) administered	Sample size	Margin of error	Bill Cassidy	Julia Letlow	Undecided
Quantus Insights (R)	May 6–7, 2026	1,015 (LV)	± 3.0%	23%	63%	14%
BDPC	April 28–30, 2026	600 (LV)	–	28%	51%	21%
American Pulse Research & Polling	March 20–24, 2026	455 (LV)	± 4.6%	24%	54%	22%
Harris, DeVille & Associates	March 13–19, 2026	683 (LV)	–	54%	46%	–
BDPC	March 16–17, 2026	600 (LV)	–	24%	50%	26%
Fabrizio, Lee & Associates (R)	March 11–12, 2026	600 (LV)	± 4.0%	34%	46%	20%
Public Opinion Strategies (R)	March 7–10, 2026	500 (LV)	–	45%	43%	12%
BDPC	February 21–23, 2026	600 (LV)	–	34%	42%	24%
Quantus Insights (R)	February 23–24, 2026	1,428 (LV)	± 2.8%	27%	48%	25%
Public Opinion Strategies (R)	January 20–22, 2026	600 (LV)	–	40%	46%	14%
Trafalgar Group (R)	March 6–10, 2025	1,068 (LV)	± 2.9%	33%	55%	12%

Bill Cassidy vs. John Fleming

Poll source	Date(s) administered	Sample size	Margin of error	Bill Cassidy	John Fleming	Undecided
Quantus Insights (R)	May 6–7, 2026	1,015 (LV)	± 3.0%	25%	55%	20%
BDPC	April 28–30, 2026	600 (LV)	–	30%	47%	23%
American Pulse Research & Polling	March 20–24, 2026	455 (LV)	± 4.6%	29%	49%	22%
Harris, DeVille & Associates	March 13–19, 2026	683 (LV)	–	51%	49%	–
BDPC	March 16–17, 2026	600 (LV)	–	26%	49%	25%
BDPC	February 21–23, 2026	600 (LV)	–	32%	43%	25%
Quantus Insights (R)	February 23–24, 2026	1,428 (LV)	± 2.8%	23%	57%	20%
JMC Analytics & Polling	February 14–16, 2026	645 (LV)	± 3.9%	28%	48%	24%
JMC Analytics & Polling	January 12–14, 2026	650 (LV)	± 3.8%	26%	44%	30%
JMC Analytics & Polling	October 15–17, 2025	610 (LV)	± 4.0%	29%	40%	31%
JMC Analytics & Polling	February 24–26, 2025	600 (LV)	± 4.0%	27%	40%	33%
Trafalgar Group (R)	March 6–10, 2025	1,068 (LV)	± 2.9%	34%	51%	15%
Trafalgar Group (R)	August 12–14, 2024	1,062 (LV)	± 2.9%	48%	52%	–

==== Results ====
Parish results: Letlow: 50–60%; 60–70%; 70–80%; Fleming: 50–60%; 60–70%; Tied: 50%

Precinct results: Letlow: 50–60%; 60–70%; 70–80%; 80–90%; >90%; Fleming: 50–60%; 60–70%; 70–80%; 80–90%; >90%; Tie: 50%; No votes

Republican primary runoff results
Party	Candidate	Votes	%
Republican	Julia Letlow	180,002	56.9
Republican	John Fleming	136,591	43.1
Total votes		316,593	100.0

== Democratic primary ==
=== Candidates ===
==== Nominee ====
- Jamie Davis, former Tensas Parish police juror (Note: Louisiana's police jurors are equivalent to the position of county commissioner in other states.) and runner-up for Louisiana's 21st House of Representatives district in 2023

==== Eliminated in runoff ====
- Gary Crockett, data scientist and political consultant

==== Eliminated in primary ====
- Nick Albares, nonprofit executive and former aide to Governor John Bel Edwards

==== Withdrawn ====
- Tracie Burke, political consultant
- Jabarie Walker, former chief of staff for the Housing Authority of New Orleans

==== Declined ====
- John Bel Edwards, former governor of Louisiana (2016–2024) and former minority leader of the Louisiana House of Representatives (2012–2015) from the 72nd district (2008–2015) (endorsed Albares)
- Mitch Landrieu, former senior advisor to the president for Infrastructure Investment & Jobs (2021–2024), former mayor of New Orleans (2010–2018), former lieutenant governor of Louisiana (2004–2010), former state representative (1988–2004), and brother of former U.S. Senator Mary Landrieu (1997–2015)
- Jay Luneau, state senator from the 29th district (2016–present)

=== Endorsements ===
Nick Albares (eliminated)

U.S. representatives

- Charlie Melançon, former LA-03 (2005–2011)

Statewide officials

- John Bel Edwards, former governor of Louisiana (2016–2024)

State legislators

- Cynthia Willard-Lewis, former SD-02 (2000–2002)

Labor unions

- AFL-CIO of Greater New Orleans

Organizations

- Forum for Equality
Jamie Davis

Statewide officials

- John Bel Edwards, former governor of Louisiana (2016–2024)

Political parties

- Louisiana Democratic Party

=== First round ===
==== Fundraising ====
Italics indicated a withdrew or declined candidate.

Campaign finance reports as of March 31, 2026
Candidate	Raised	Spent	Cash on hand
Jamie Davis (D)	$325,965	$184,143	$141,821
Source: Federal Election Commission

==== Results ====
Parish results: Davis: 30–40%; 40–50%; 50–60%; 60–70%; 70–80%; 80–90%

Precinct results: Davis: 30–40%; 40–50%; 50–60%; 60–70%; 70–80%; 80–90%; >90%; Crockett: 30–40%; 40–50%; 50–60%; 60–70%; 70–80%; 80–90%; >90%; Albares: 30–40%; 40–50%; 50–60%; 60–70%; 70–80%; 80–90%; >90%; Tie: 30–40%; 40–50%; 50%; No votes

Democratic primary results
Party	Candidate	Votes	%
Democratic	Jamie Davis	163,549	47.4
Democratic	Gary Crockett	90,791	26.3
Democratic	Nicholas Albares	90,498	26.2
Total votes		344,838	100.0

=== Runoff ===
==== Fundraising ====
Campaign finance reports as of May 17, 2026
Candidate	Raised	Spent	Cash on hand
Gary Crockett (D)	$350,000	$32,737	$655,124
Jamie Davis (D)	$562,283	$342,312	$219,971
Source: Federal Election Commission

==== Results ====
Parish results: Davis: 60–70%; 70–80%; 80–90%; 90–100%

Precinct results: Davis: 50–60%; 60–70%; 70–80%; 80–90%; >90%; Crockett: 50–60%; 60–70%; 70–80%; 80–90%; >90%; Tie: 50%; No votes

Democratic primary runoff results
Party	Candidate	Votes	%
Democratic	Jamie Davis	156,789	79.9
Democratic	Gary Crockett	39,423	20.1
Total votes		196,212	100.0

== General election ==
=== Predictions ===
Source	Ranking	As of
The Cook Political Report	Solid R	November 2, 2026
Decision Desk HQ	Likely R	November 3, 2026
The Economist (Note: The Economist's prediction model uses unconventional terminology. For the purpose of equivalency, their "Very Likely" ratings are formatted as a "Likely" rating while "Likely" ratings are formatted as a "Lean" rating.)	Likely R	November 3, 2026
FiftyPlusOne	Likely R	November 3, 2026
Fox News	Solid R	November 1, 2026
Inside Elections	Likely R	October 29, 2026
MS NOW	Safe R	October 29, 2026
NBC News	Solid R	November 3, 2026
RealClearPolitics	Solid R	November 2, 2026
Sabato's Crystal Ball	Lean R	November 2, 2026
Silver Bulletin	Likely R	November 3, 2026
Split Ticket	Likely R	November 2, 2026

=== Endorsements ===
Jamie Davis (D)

Organizations

- Reproductive Freedom for All

=== Fundraising ===
Campaign finance reports as of October 14, 2026
Candidate	Raised	Spent	Cash on hand
Julia Letlow (R)	$7,062,069	$6,618,899	$443,170
Jamie Davis (D)	$5,019,888	$3,764,960	$1,254,929
Source: Federal Election Commission

=== Polling ===
Aggregate polls

Source of poll aggregation	Dates administered	Dates updated	Julia Letlow (R)	Jamie Davis (D)	Other/ Undecided (Note: Calculated by taking the difference of 100% and all other candidates combined.)	Margin
Silver Bulletin	through October 31, 2026	November 3, 2026	47.8%	43.8%	8.4%	Letlow +4.0%

Poll source	Date(s) administered	Sample size	Margin of error	Julia Letlow (R)	Jamie Davis (D)	Undecided
Lincoln Park Strategies (D) (Note: Poll commissioned by the Louisiana Democratic Party)	October 29–31, 2026	(LV)	—	47%	47%	6%
Hart Research Associates (D) (Note: Poll commissioned by Davis' campaign)	October 28–29, 2026	502 (LV)	± 4.5%	45%	45%	10%
Hart Research Associates (D)	September 17–19, 2026	500 (LV)	± 4.5%	48%	44%	8%
Public Policy Polling (D)	July 21–22, 2026	518 (RV)	—	41%	37%	22%

=== Results ===
2026 United States Senate election in Louisiana
Party	Candidate	Votes	%
Republican	Julia Letlow	746,466	50.88
Democratic	Jamie Davis	720,516	49.12
Total votes		1,466,982	100.0
Republican hold			

==== By congressional district ====
Letlow won five congressional districts, while Davis won one.

District	Davis	Letlow	Elected Representative
1st	40.39%	59.61%	Steve Scalise
2nd	82.32%	17.68%	Troy Carter
3rd	41.94%	58.06%	Clay Higgins
4th	41.64%	58.36%	Mike Johnson
5th	42.34%	57.66%	Pending runoff
6th	46.07%	53.93%	Pending runoff

== Notes ==
Partisan clients
