= Primary challenge =

Challenge by a member of the same political party

In U.S. politics, a primary challenge is when an incumbent holding elective office is challenged by a member of their own political party in a primary election. Such events, known informally as "being primaried," are noteworthy and not frequent in the United States, as traditionally political parties support incumbents, both for party unity and to minimize the possibility of losing the seat to an opposing party. In addition, officeholders are frequently seen as de facto leaders of their party, eligible to establish policy and administer affairs as they see fit. A primary challenge thus interferes with this "spoil of office," and is largely discouraged. Though typically used to describe challenges to elected officials, the term is also applied to officeholders such as appointed U.S. senators.

== Frequency in safe seats ==
In jurisdictions predominantly under the political control of a single political party, or where the overwhelming majority of registered voters (in jurisdictions that require party registration) belong to a single party (a "safe seat"), there is likely to be less fear of opposing parties gaining sufficient support to mount a credible challenge. In such an area, particularly those that have been gerrymandered, members of the party feel more at ease to challenge current officeholders, because no loss of the seat is expected.

== Skewed electorate and issue advocacy group participation ==
Primary elections in the United States generally draw a very low voter turnout. In addition, only a small portion of the public may be educated on the issue stances of all primary candidates, as primary elections typically use little or no mass media advertising. Party activists, ideologues, and local party leaders may constitute an unusually high number of, or exert disproportionate levels of influence on, those who actually vote.

This situation provides opportunities for organizations focused on a single issue, such as gun control, taxation, or abortion. Such organizations may be able to convince their supporters to endure the difficulty of voting, while other eligible voters may not want to take the trouble for a "minor election."

== Notable primary challenges ==
=== Presidential ===
Since the advent of the modern primary election system in 1972, an incumbent president has never been defeated by a primary challenger, though every president who faced a strong primary challenge went on to be defeated in the general election.

- In the 1992 Republican Party presidential primaries, President George H. W. Bush had lost much support of conservatives within the Republican Party for breaking his promise to not implement new taxes when he had been forced to do so in an effort to lower the deficit and strengthen the economy. Pat Buchanan would go on to challenge him but failed to win any contests, but won almost a quarter of the vote. In the general election, independent candidate Ross Perot would go on to make the deficit central to his campaign. Bush went on to lose the general election.
- In the 1980 Democratic Party presidential primaries, President Jimmy Carter, unpopular due to his handling of the 1979 oil crisis and rising inflation, was challenged by Senator Ted Kennedy of Massachusetts and Governor Jerry Brown of California. Brown dropped out of the race in April, while Kennedy remained and ultimately won 12 primaries. Carter's popularity rose sharply due to his initial handling of the Iran hostage crisis, but momentum built for Ted Kennedy, who won several major late primaries after Carter's attempt to rescue the hostages ended in disaster and drew further skepticism towards Carter's leadership ability. Carter had maintained a sizable delegate lead and won on the first ballot of the 1980 Democratic National Convention. Carter went on to lose the general election.
- In the 1976 Republican Party presidential primaries, President Gerald Ford, who was never elected president or vice president, and ascended to the presidency after being appointed vice president by Richard Nixon, faced a challenge from former California governor Ronald Reagan. Ford's popularity with voters suffered from his decision to pardon Nixon for his role in the Watergate scandal. Reagan won 24 primaries, but was narrowly defeated by Ford on the first ballot of the 1976 Republican National Convention. Ford went on to lose the general election.
- In the 1968 Democratic Party presidential primaries, President Lyndon B. Johnson was challenged by Senator Eugene McCarthy, who was running on a platform opposed to involvement in the Vietnam War. Though Johnson won the New Hampshire primary, his showing was seen as poor for a sitting president and he dropped out of the race shortly after.
- In the 1952 Democratic Party presidential primaries, President Harry S. Truman was challenged by Senator Estes Kefauver. Truman lost the New Hampshire primary to Kefauver and dropped out of the race shortly after.

=== U.S. Senate ===
Sabato's Crystal Ball tabulated that from 1946 to 2018, only 4% of primaries with an incumbent U.S. senator running resulted in a win by a primary challenger. This figure includes incumbents running unopposed or against paper candidates, meaning credible primary challengers have a higher rate of success.

- 2026 United States Senate election in Louisiana: Sen. Bill Cassidy was unseated in the Republican primary after President Donald Trump endorsed Rep. Julia Letlow in response to Cassidy's vote to convict him in his second impeachment trial. Cassidy was the only senator defeated in a primary who had voted to convict Trump, after a Trump-backed challenger failed to unseat Lisa Murkowski in 2022 and he declined to support a challenger to Susan Collins in 2026; the remaining senators who voted to convict declined to seek reelection.
- 2020 United States Senate election in Massachusetts: Ed Markey was challenged by Rep. Joe Kennedy III in the Democratic primary. Markey received the support of the Democratic Senate leadership, while Kennedy received the support of the Democratic House leadership, including Speaker Nancy Pelosi, marking a rare occurrence of party leaders supporting a primary challenge. Markey went on to win renomination and the general election.
- 2012 United States Senate election in Indiana: Richard Lugar, a six-term incumbent, was defeated by Richard Mourdock in the Republican primary. Lugar had become unpopular with Republican voters for his willingness to work with the Obama administration. Mourdock went on to lose the general election.
- 2010 United States Senate elections:
  - In Pennsylvania, Arlen Specter, a Republican-turned-Democrat, lost renomination to Joe Sestak despite having support from Democratic Senate leadership and the White House. Sestak went on to lose the general election.
  - In Alaska, Lisa Murkowski lost the Republican primary to Joe Miller, a candidate backed by the Tea Party movement. Murkowski won re-election as a write-in candidate.
- 2006 United States Senate election in Connecticut: Joe Lieberman was defeated by Ned Lamont for the Democratic nomination after Lieberman supported numerous conservative policies during the George W. Bush administration. Lieberman won re-election as an independent candidate.
- 2002 United States Senate election in New Hampshire: Bob Smith was defeated by John E. Sununu for the Republican nomination. Smith had become unpopular with Republican voters after he left the Republican party three years earlier, claiming that its platform was "not worth the paper it's written on", but rejoined a few months later, saying he made a mistake. Sununu won the general election.
- 1992 United States Senate election in Illinois: Alan J. Dixon was defeated by Carol Moseley Braun for the Democratic nomination, following Dixon's controversial vote to confirm Clarence Thomas to the Supreme Court that outraged Democrats. Moseley Braun won the general election.

=== U.S. House ===
From 1946 to 2018, only 1.6% of primaries with an incumbent representative running resulted in a win by a primary challenger. This percentage also includes incumbents running against other incumbents because of House seats being eliminated by reapportioning, which are typically not referred to as primary challenges; if reapportioning years are excluded, less than 1% of primaries with an incumbent running are won by challengers. This also includes incumbents running unopposed or against paper candidates, meaning credible primary challengers have a higher rate of success.

- 2022: Of the ten Republicans who supported the second impeachment of Donald Trump in 2021, six ran for reelection in 2022, and all faced significant competition in their primaries. All three representatives who competed in partisan primaries–Peter Meijer (Michigan), Tom Rice (South Carolina) and Liz Cheney (Wyoming)–were unseated by Trump-backed challengers. Jaime Herrera Beutler (Washington) failed to advance to the general election after finishing behind a Trump-backed challenger in a blanket primary. Only Dan Newhouse (Washington) and David Valadao (California), who competed in blanket primaries, advanced to the general election; Valadao was the only representative who did not face a Trump-backed challenger.
- 2018:
  - Two members of "the Squad" unseated Democratic incumbents: Alexandria Ocasio-Cortez defeated Rep. Joe Crowley of New York, the chair of the Democratic caucus, and Ayanna Pressley (Massachusetts) defeated Rep. Mike Capuano of Massachusetts, a ten-term incumbent.
  - Republican Rep. Mark Sanford of South Carolina was defeated by Katie Arrington after Arrington received the support of President Donald Trump, marking a rare occurrence of a president endorsing a primary challenger to an incumbent of his own party. Arrington went on to lose the general election.
- 2014: David Brat, a college professor and political newcomer, defeated Rep. Eric Cantor of Virginia, the House majority leader, for the Republican nomination in the 7th district in an upset, marking the first time a majority leader had lost a primary.

=== Governors ===
As of 2018, 14% of contested primaries with an incumbent governor running resulted in a win by a primary challenger.

- 2018 Kansas gubernatorial election: Incumbent Jeff Colyer, who had succeeded as governor when Sam Brownback resigned, narrowly lost the Republican primary to Kris Kobach, the Kansas secretary of state, who was perceived as a far-right figure due to his stance on immigration. Kobach lost the general election to Democrat Laura Kelly despite Kansas's strong Republican tilt in other recent elections.
- 2014 Hawaii gubernatorial election: Incumbent Neil Abercrombie was defeated by David Ige 66%-31% in the Democratic primary. Ige won the general election.
- 2006 Alaska gubernatorial election: Incumbent Frank Murkowski finished third in the Republican primary, behind former Wasilla mayor Sarah Palin and businessman John Binkley. Murkowski's approval rating was only 19%, dragged down by numerous unpopular policies. Palin won the general election.
