= McKeithen =

McKeithen is a surname. Notable people with the surname include:

- John McKeithen (1918–1999), American politician
- W. Fox McKeithen (1946–2005), American politician
