= 2026 Louisiana Amendment 1 =

2026 referendum

- May 16, 2026
- Legislative Authority to Add or Remove Unclassified Civil Service Positions Amendment

Results
Choice	Votes	%
Yes	173,508	21.58%
No	630,420	78.42%
Total votes	803,928	100.00%

No
60–70%
70–80%
80–90%
90–100%

Louisiana Amendment 1, also known as the Legislative Authority to Add or Remove Unclassified Civil Service Positions Amendment, was a legislatively referred constitutional amendment that appeared on the ballot in the U.S. state of Louisiana on May 16, 2026. The amendment failed.

== Background and impact ==
In Louisiana, a state civil service commission determines if positions are part of a classified civil service, or an unclassified civil service. As part of a classified civil service, the individuals are subject to certain rules imposed by the Civil Service Rules. This amendment was introduced by state senator Jay Morris, and would have given the state legislature authorization to add officers, positions, and employees to the unclassified civil service.

== Endorsements ==
Yes

State legislators

- Jay Morris, state senator from the 35th district (2020–present) (Republican)

Organizations

- Pelican Institute
No

State legislators

- Matthew Willard, New Orleans City Councilor (2026–present) and former state representative from the 97th district (2020–2026) (Democratic)

== Results ==
Louisiana Amendment 1
Choice	Votes	%
For	173,508	21.58
Against	630,420	78.42
Total	803,928	100.00
Source: Secretary of State of Louisiana
