= Louisiana's 21st House of Representatives district =

American legislative district

Louisiana's 21st State House of Representatives district
Representative
C. Travis Johnson; D–Vidalia

Louisiana's 21st House of Representatives district is one of 105 Louisiana House of Representatives districts. It is currently represented by Democratic C. Travis Johnson of Vidalia.

== Geography ==
House District 21 is located in northeastern Louisiana and includes portions of Madison Parish, Franklin Parish, Concordia Parish, and Catahoula Parish. The district includes the municipalities of Tallulah, Winnsboro, Jonesville, and Vidalia.

== Election results ==
Year	Winning candidate	Party	Percent	Opponent	Party	Percent
1983	Al Ater	Democratic	53%	David I. Patten	Democratic	28.3%
1987	Al Ater	Democratic	100%			
1991	Bryant Hammett	Democratic	52.6%	Moses Junior Williams	Democratic	47.4%
1995	Bryant Hammett	Democratic	56.7%	Sammy Davis, Jr.	Democratic	43.3%
1999	Bryant Hammett	Democratic	68.6%	Sammy Davis, Jr.	Democratic	31.4%
2003	Bryant Hammett	Democratic	100%			
2006 (special)	Andy Anders	Democratic	60.2%	Samuel Thomas	Democratic	39.8%
2007	Andy Anders	Democratic	60.8%	C. Travis Johnson	Democratic	16.2%
2011	Andy Anders	Democratic	69.4%	Justin Conner	Democratic	31.6%
2015	Andy Anders	Democratic	100%			
2019	C. Travis Johnson	Democratic	58.7%	Glenn McGlothin Jr.	Independent	41.3%
2023	C. Travis Johnson	Democratic	52.4%	James Davis Jr.	Democratic	47.3%
