= Jay Dardenne =

53rd Lieutenant Governor of Louisiana

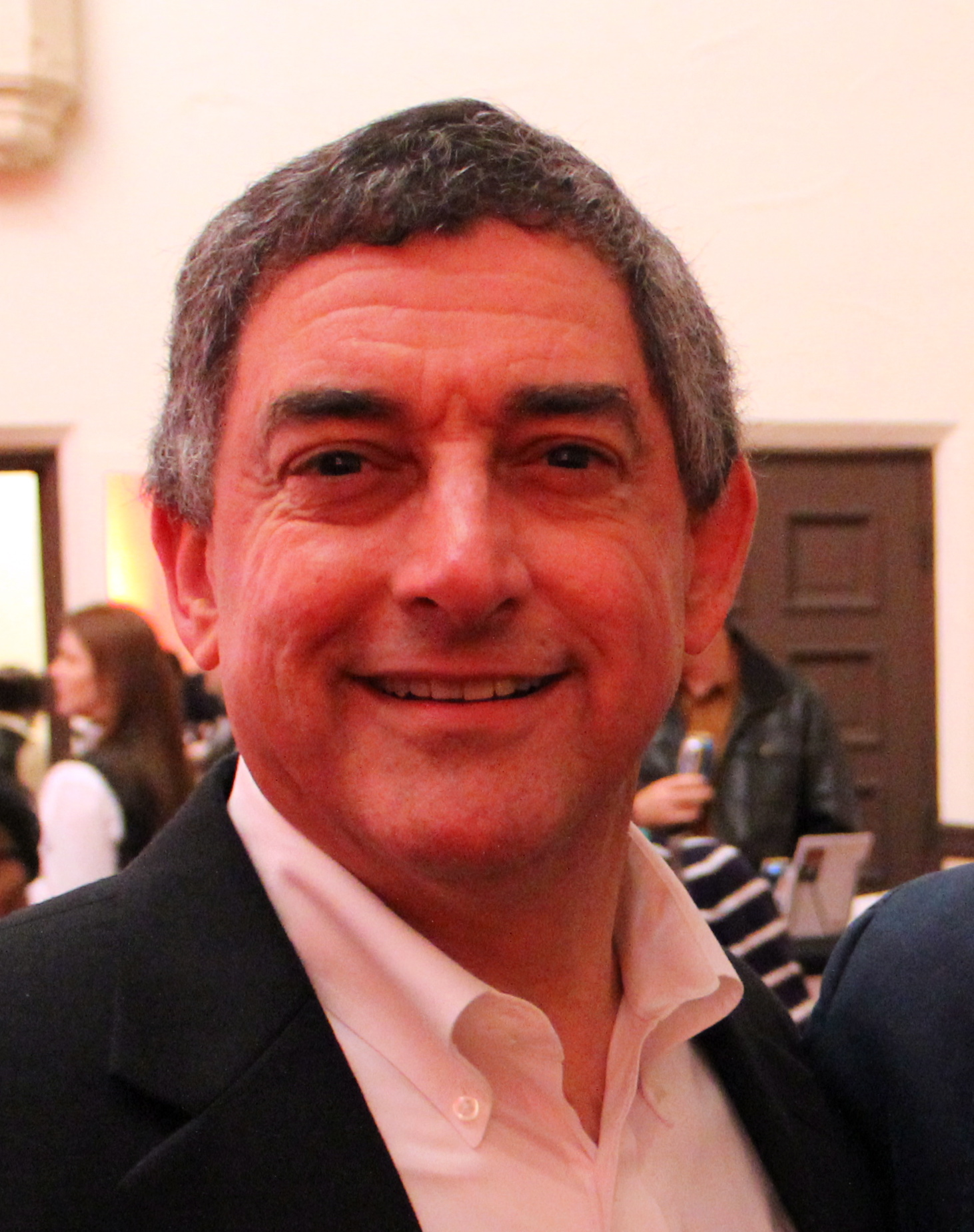

Louisiana Commissioner of Administration
- In office January 11, 2016 – January 8, 2024
- Governor: John Bel Edwards
- Preceded by: Stafford Palmieri
- Succeeded by: Taylor Barras

53rd Lieutenant Governor of Louisiana
- In office November 22, 2010 – January 11, 2016
- Governor: Bobby Jindal
- Preceded by: Scott Angelle
- Succeeded by: Billy Nungesser

Secretary of State of Louisiana
- In office November 10, 2006 – November 22, 2010
- Governor: Kathleen Blanco; Bobby Jindal
- Preceded by: Al Ater
- Succeeded by: Tom Schedler

Member of the Louisiana Senate from the 16th district
- In office January 1992 – November 10, 2006
- Preceded by: Kenneth Osterberger
- Succeeded by: Bill Cassidy

Personal details
- Born: John Leigh Dardenne Jr. February 6, 1954 (age 72) Baton Rouge, Louisiana, U.S.
- Party: Republican
- Spouse: Cathy McDonald
- Children: 2
- Education: Louisiana State University (BA, JD)

John Leigh "Jay" Dardenne, Jr. (born February 6, 1954) is an American lawyer and politician from Baton Rouge, Louisiana, who served as commissioner of administration for Democratic Governor John Bel Edwards. A Republican, Dardenne previously served as the 53rd lieutenant governor of his state from 2010 to 2016. Dardenne was Louisiana secretary of state. He was previously a member of the Louisiana State Senate for the Baton Rouge suburbs, a position he filled from 1992 until his election as secretary of state on September 30, 2006.

== Political overview ==
Dardenne was reelected to a full term as secretary of state in the October 20, 2007, nonpartisan blanket primary with 758,156 votes (63 percent) to 373,956 (31 percent) for the Democrat R. Rick Wooley. A "No Party" candidate, Scott Lewis, received the remaining 64,704 votes (5 percent). Dardenne won fifty-eight of the state's sixty-four parishes. He outpolled gubernatorial candidate Bobby Jindal, a fellow Republican, in raw votes and won sixty-one parishes to Jindal's sixty.

On November 2, 2010, Dardenne was elected lieutenant governor when he defeated Caroline Fayard, a young Democrat originally from Denham Springs in Livingston Parish. Tom Schedler, Dardenne's chief deputy in the secretary of state's office, succeeded him as acting secretary of state when Dardenne was sworn in as lieutenant governor.

Dardenne polled 719,243 votes (57 percent) to Fayard's 540,633 (43 percent). Dardenne won most of the sixty-four parishes but lost Orleans, Caddo, and St. Landry.

== Background ==
Dardenne is one of two sons of the late Tonet and Johnny Dardenne; his grandparents were Nathan and Ula Coronna Abramson and Teakle Wallis "T. W." and Esther Cohn Dardenne. His younger brother, Richard James Dardenne (1956-2018), was a basketball and track coach who spent his last years in Fort Worth, Texas.

Dardenne is married to the former Catherine "Cathy" McDonald (born September 23, 1955). The couple has two sons: John Dardenne of Los Angeles, California, and Matthew Dardenne of Baton Rouge.

Dardenne is Jewish and a graduate of Baton Rouge High School and Louisiana State University, from which he obtained a Bachelor of Arts in journalism. He earned a degree from the Louisiana State University Law Center. He was elected student body president at LSU. He is a member of the Sigma Chi fraternity.

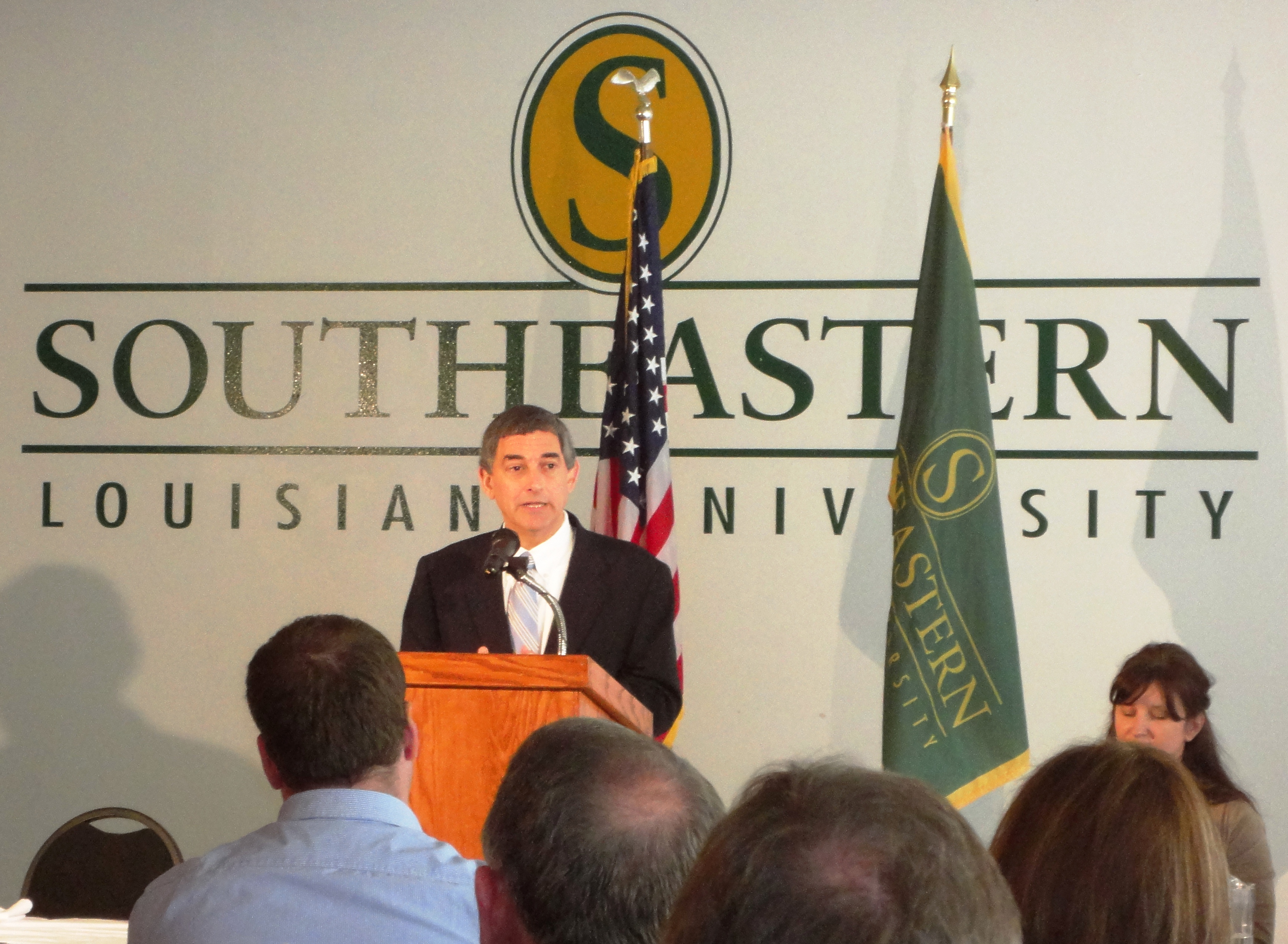
Dardenne speaking to the Hammond Chamber of Commerce luncheon in the Twelve Oaks Cafeteria at Southeastern Louisiana University on the topic of Louisiana's historical political figures.

Dardenne is active in social and civic endeavors in his native Baton Rouge and through non-profit organizations throughout Louisiana. He volunteers with the Muscular Dystrophy Association, the annual Labor Day Telethon, the Cerebral Palsy Foundation, and the River City Festivals Association. He serves as chairman of the U.S. National Senior Sports Classic (the Senior Olympics), and has served as president of ten non-profit organizations in the greater Baton Rouge Community.

Dardenne is also an amateur fiction writer and has won "Dishonorable Mentions" for his entries in the 2008 Bulwer-Lytton Fiction Contest, a competition where contestants submit bad opening lines to imaginary novels. Dardenne also won the 'Most Vile Pun' award in the 2006 contest.

== State senator ==
In 1987, Dardenne narrowly lost his first race for the District 15 state Senate seat to the Democrat Larry S. Bankston, one of three sons of former Democratic state party chairman and centenarian Jesse Bankston. Dardenne then won an election for a seat on the East Baton Rouge Metropolitan Council and held that seat until 1992.

Following the election of Republican Murphy J. "Mike" Foster, Jr., as governor in 1995, Dardenne became the governor's floor leader and began to pass landmark legislation. He continued to push unsuccessfully for reforms in the administration of Foster's successor, Democrat Kathleen Babineaux Blanco. He did help pass constitutional amendments on term limits, coastal erosion, and victims' rights. He worked for the creation of a single State Board of Ethics, spearheading reform of the river pilots' system, and reducing government waste as the chairman of the Louisiana Senate Finance Committee. In 2003, Dardenne was named the "National Republican Legislator of the Year".

== Secretary of state candidacy and transition ==
Dardenne ran in the September 30 special election to complete the term vacated by the death of former Secretary of State W. Fox McKeithen, a fellow Republican who died in the summer of 2005. former Democratic State Representative Al Ater of Ferriday in Concordia Parish, was assistant secretary of state under McKeithen and served as acting until a new secretary was elected. He was a friend of McKeithen and former Democratic State Representative. He chose not to run for the post in the special election.

The major candidates in the race were Dardenne, Democratic state Senator Francis C. Heitmeier of New Orleans and Republican former State Chairman Mike Francis of Lafayette and Crowley. The race was characterized by attacks on Dardenne from Francis (both taking anti-abortion positions) over predominantly social issues, including Dardenne's vote as Senator in the 1990s for language in the federal Hyde Amendment which allows for federally funded abortions in the case of rape or incest. These exceptions have been included since 1977 in response to women's rights advocates, while abortion opponents argue that they punish the unborn for the crimes of the fathers. Dardenne maintained that his vote was required to ensure Louisiana continuing to receive Medicaid funds.

Dardenne received 30 percent of the vote in the primary; Heitmeier, 28 percent, and Francis, 26 percent. Minor candidates took the rest of the vote. A Dardenne v. Heitmeier runoff loomed. Francis chose not to endorse either candidate and said he would run for the seat in the 2007 regular election. In the end, Francis did not run for the position in the regular primary held on October 20, 2007.

About two weeks into the special election runoff campaign, Heitmeier withdrew. He said that his New Orleans Democratic voter base had been decimated because of the aftermath of Hurricane Katrina, as tens of thousands of people had to evacuate the city before and after the destructive storm and flooding. He said that without help from national Democrats, victory over Dardenne would be impossible. According to Louisiana Political Report, his withdrawal may have been premature in light of the national Democratic sweep in the 2006 midterm elections.

Dardenne, Francis, and two minor Republican candidates together received 54 percent of the vote in the city of New Orleans, the power base for the state Democratic Party, reflecting changed demographics. Two months earlier, two Republican candidates for mayor of New Orleans together had barely polled 10 percent of the vote.

== Secretary of state ==
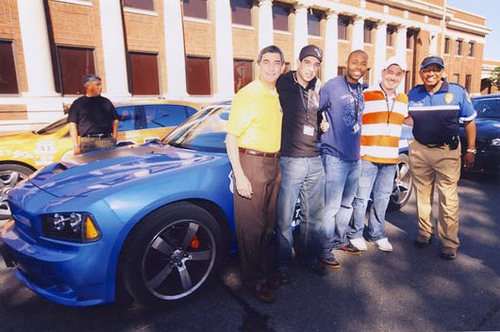
Secretary of state Jay Dardenne with TeamCPX in Fireball Run 2008.

Dardenne was elected, becoming the first known Jewish statewide constitutional officer in Louisiana since the 1800s, when both Judah P. Benjamin and Benjamin F. Jonas were U.S. senators; Judah Benjamin later served as Secretary of State of the Confederate States of America.

Dardenne pushed for what he termed election reform, but his suggestions restricted access to voting. Although the region and many citizens were still struggling with disruption due to Hurricane Katrina, he opposed establishing satellite voting areas throughout the state and elsewhere for the evacuees. Dardenne also proposed that poll commissioner fees be increased, election day hours be shortened, and an early voting period be established to compensate for reduced hours on Election Day.

Dardenne object to widespread satellite voting for Katrina evacuees because, he said, "if this bill passes, you are saying to them [election workers], you have to run an additional election for Orleans Parish. The 2006 mayoral race had received special consideration because no other elections were held on that day. Dardenne did support the reinstatement of absentee voting provisions from the election. The Louisiana House panel approved more satellite voting.

== Lieutenant governor ==
On February 12, 2010, Dardenne announced his intention to run for Lieutenant Governor in the special election held on October 2. Leading a multi-candidate field with 28% of the ballots cast, Dardenne advanced to face Democrat Caroline Fayard, a previously political unknown who enjoyed the backing of former U.S. President Bill Clinton and trailed with 24% of the vote. The two were to meet in the November 2 general election. Three other Republican candidates were eliminated in the primary — singer Sammy Kershaw (19%), St. Tammany Parish President Kevin Davis (8%), and Louisiana Republican Party state chairman Roger F. Villere, Jr. (4%) — along with Democrat Butch Gautreaux (4 percent), then a Louisiana state senator. Kershaw, Davis, and Villere endorsed fellow Republican Dardenne, as Gautreaux supported fellow Democrat Fayard. Results of the primary election—in the cases of Kershaw, Gautreaux, and Davis—were localized. Kershaw's appeal was in his home base of Acadiana and in rural areas where Country music is popular. Gautreaux's vote was largely in a radius around Morgan City. Davis won a strong plurality, 47 percent, in his home parish of Saint Tammany. Kershaw's rural appeal helped him carry 31 of the 64 parishes, more than any other candidate.

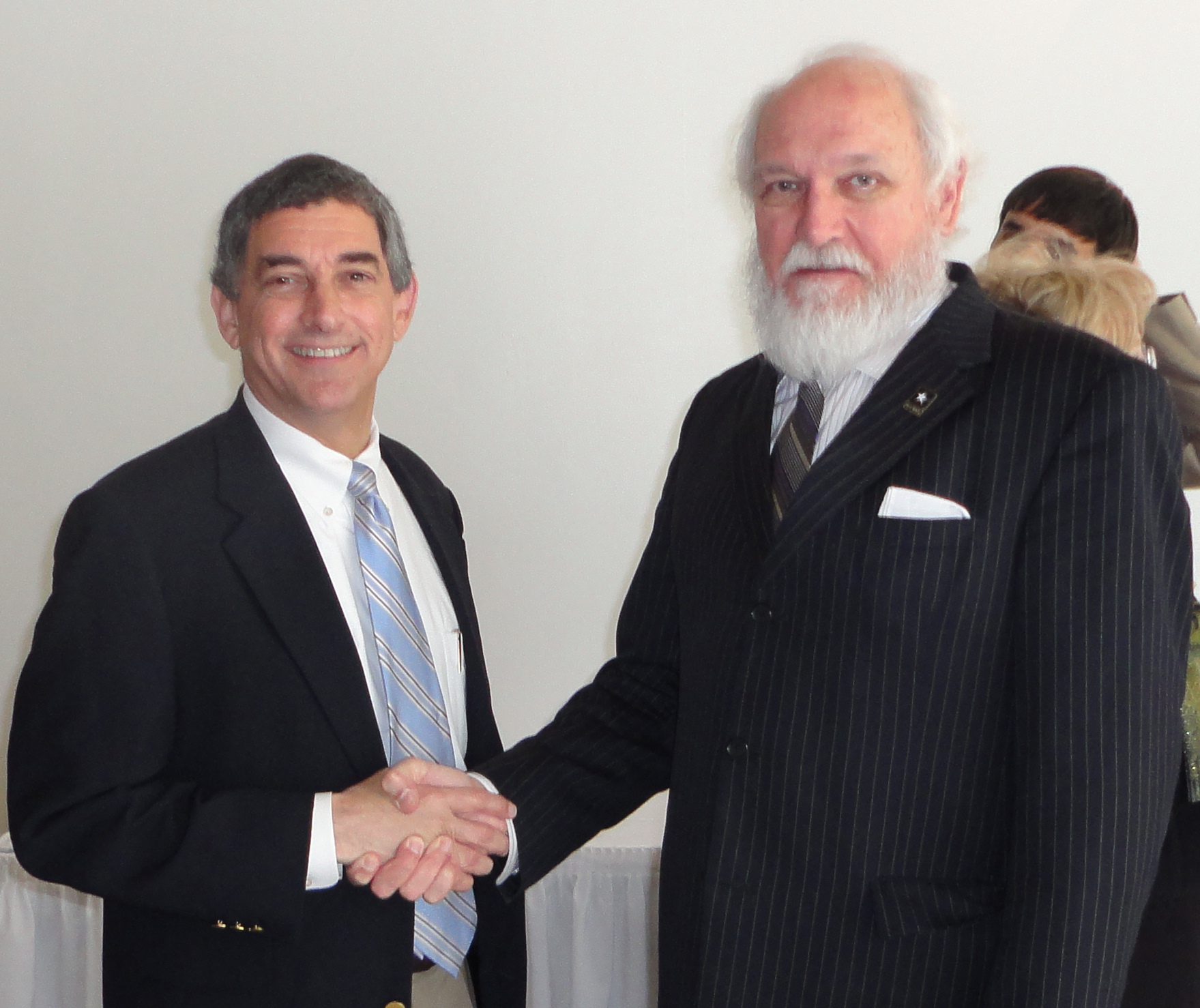
Louisiana Lieutenant Governor Jay Dardenne (left) spoke on January 19, 2012, to the Hammond Chamber of Commerce, which met in Southeastern Louisiana University's Twelve Oaks Cafeteria. His presentation included popular songs associated with historic Louisiana political figures. The office of the lieutenant governor is heavily involved in marketing the state for tourism. Dardenne believes that an untapped potential for Louisiana is to attract tourists on the basis of political legends. He recounted examples of humorous statements by former governors and State Senator Dudley J. LeBlanc, originator of Hadacol patent medicine.

Republican chairman Villere's endorsement of Dardenne, which came after months of criticizing the frontrunner, was met with incredulous statements like those of political scientist Pearson Cross of the University of Louisiana at Lafayette:

Maybe he thinks that you can at the end of the day say, "Well, we just need to all come together." It just seems odd.

Dardenne and Fayard appeared on the October 15 episode of the news magazine Louisiana: The State We're In televised by Louisiana Public Broadcasting and in an October 22 forum sponsored by the Baton Rouge League of Women Voters.

On October 4, 2010, Southeastern Louisiana University political scientist Michael Kurt Corbello summarized the runoff election between veteran officeholder Dardenne and political newcomer Fayard as "a very interesting, competitive race."

Political columnist John Maginnis joked that

Dardenne, rather, needs to raise the stakes of this election, emphasizing experience and readiness. Otherwise, should this become a beauty contest, he's got problems.

The runoff campaign soon turned controversial as Dardenne described Fayard as a supporter of U.S. President Barack Obama, a proponent of gay marriage, and an opponent of the death penalty, while Fayard, who was 32 years of age and had never held political office, countered that Dardenne represented "the same old crowd" of Louisiana politics.

Stephanie Grace offered an explanation for Dardenne's emphasis on national political themes as an accommodation to the Tea Party movement in the backdrop of their having worked to defeat Hunt Downer, a veteran officeholder upset by a newcomer, Jeff Landry, in Louisiana's 3rd congressional district's 2010 Republican primary. For further information about the 2010 election, please see Louisiana state elections, 2010#Lieutenant Governor.

== 2011 reelection ==
The 2011 regular election for a four-year term as lieutenant governor was similarly raucous, as Dardenne was challenged by fellow Republican Billy Nungesser, president of Plaquemines Parish and the son of the late former Republican Party state chairman William A. Nungesser. In a low-turnout race, Dardenne defeated Nungesser, 504,228 votes (53.1 percent) to 444,750 ballots (46.9 percent).

In 2012, Dardenne complained of the lack of funds needed for tourism advertising, a main prerogative of the lieutenant governor's office in Louisiana. On June 15, 2012, Governor Jindal used his line item veto to strip $2 million for tourism advertising from Dardenne's office budget. Jindal also took aim at more than $500,000 from the departmental operating funds of Louisiana State Treasurer John N. Kennedy.

== Election history ==
Louisiana State Senate, District 15, 1987

Threshold > 50%

First Ballot, October 24, 1987

Candidate	Affiliation	Support	Outcome
Larry S. Bankston	Democrat	15,401 (46%)	Runoff
John L. "Jay" Dardenne, Jr.	Republican	10,313 (31%)	Runoff
Johnny H. Dykes	Democratic	3,790 (11%)	Defeated
"Chuck" Hall	Republican	2,046 (6%)	Defeated
Others	n.a.	2,063 (6%)	Defeated

Second Ballot, November 8, 1987

Candidate	Affiliation	Support	Outcome
Larry S. Bankston	Democratic	12,619 (51%)	Elected
John L. "Jay" Dardenne, Jr.	Republican	12,332 (49%)	Defeated

East Baton Rouge Metropolitan Council, District 12, 1988

Threshold > 50%

First Ballot, October 1, 1988

Candidate	Affiliation	Support	Outcome
John L. "Jay" Dardenne, Jr.	Republican	5,596 (62%)	Winner
Craig S. Watson	Democratic	2,175 (24%)	Defeated
"Pam" Atiyeh	Republican	1,005 (11%)	Defeated
Mike Kolakowski	Democratic	285 (3%)	Defeated

Louisiana State Senate, District 16, 1991

Threshold > 50%

First Ballot, October 19, 1991

Candidate	Affiliation	Support	Outcome
Lynda Imes	Republican	21,679 (48%)	Runoff
John L. "Jay" Dardenne, Jr.	Republican	18,642 (42%)	Runoff
Francis Pellegrin	Republican	2,098 (5%)	Defeated
Others	n.a.	2,391 (5%)	Defeated

Second Ballot, November 16, 1991

Candidate	Affiliation	Support	Outcome
John L. "Jay" Dardenne, Jr.	Republican	26,120 (52%)	Elected
Lynda Imes	Republican	23,934 (48%)	Defeated

Louisiana State Senate, District 16, 1995

Candidate	Affiliation	Support	Outcome
John L. "Jay" Dardenne, Jr.	Republican	–	Unopposed

Louisiana State Senate, District 16, 1999

Candidate	Affiliation	Support	Outcome
John L. "Jay" Dardenne, Jr.	Republican	–	Unopposed

Louisiana State Senate, District 16, 2003

Threshold > 50%

First Ballot, October 4, 2003

Candidate	Affiliation	Support	Outcome
Jay Dardenne	Republican	34,679 (78%)	Elected
Chris Warner	Republican	9,758 (22%)	Defeated

Secretary of State of Louisiana, 2006

Threshold > 50%

First Ballot, September 30, 2006

Candidate	Affiliation	Support	Outcome
"Jay" Dardenne	Republican	191,562 (30%)	Runoff
Francis C. Heitmeier	Democratic	179,153 (28%)	Runoff
"Mike" Francis	Republican	168,185 (26%)	Defeated
Mary Chehardy	Republican	56,225 (9%)	Defeated
Others	n.a.	48,802 (13%)	Defeated

Second Ballot, November 7, 2006

Candidate	Affiliation	Support	Outcome
"Jay" Dardenne	Republican	–	Elected
Francis C. Heitmeier	Democratic	–	Withdrawn

Secretary of State of Louisiana, 2007

Threshold > 50%

First Ballot, October 20, 2007

Candidate	Affiliation	Support	Outcome
"Jay" Dardenne	Republican	757,821 (63%)	Elected
"R." Rick Wooley	Democratic	374,199 (31%)	Defeated
Scott Lewis	Independent	64,723 (5%)	Defeated

Lieutenant Governor of Louisiana, 2010

Threshold > 50%

First Ballot, October 2, 2010

Candidate	Affiliation	Support	Outcome
"Jay" Dardenne	Republican	180,944 (28%)	Runoff
Caroline Fayard	Democratic	159,507 (24%)	Runoff
"Sammy" Kershaw	Republican	126,166 (19%)	Defeated
Kevin Davis	Republican	51,542 (8%)	Defeated
James "Jim" Crowley	Democrat	51,461 (8%)	Defeated
Others	n.a.	85,496 (13%)	Defeated

Second Ballot, November 7, 2010

Candidate	Affiliation	Support	Outcome
"Jay" Dardenne	Republican	719,271 (57%)	Elected
Caroline Fayard	Democratic	540,649 (43%)	Defeated

Lieutenant Governor of Louisiana, 2011

Threshold > 50%

First Ballot, October 22, 2011

Candidate	Affiliation	Support	Outcome
John L. "Jay" Dardenne, Jr.	Republican	504,228 (53%)	Elected
Billy Nungesser	Republican	444,750 (47%)	Defeated

All election results taken from the Louisiana Secretary of State website

Party political offices
Preceded by W. Fox McKeithen	Republican nominee for Secretary of State of Louisiana; 2007	Succeeded by Tom Schedler
Vacant Title last held by Suzanne Mayfield Krieger	Republican nominee for Lieutenant Governor of Louisiana; 2010	Succeeded by Billy Nungesser
Political offices
Preceded by Al Ater	Secretary of State of Louisiana; 2006–2010	Succeeded by Tom Schedler
Preceded by Scott Angelle	Lieutenant Governor of Louisiana; 2010–2016	Succeeded by Billy Nungesser
