= Jay Luneau =

American politician

Member of the Louisiana Senate from the 29th district
- Incumbent
- Assumed office January 11, 2016
- Preceded by: Rick Gallot

Personal details
- Born: Wendell Jay Luneau
- Party: Democratic
- Spouse: Carman Luneau
- Children: 2
- Education: Louisiana Tech University (BA); Southern University (JD)

Wendell Jay Luneau is an American lawyer, educator, and politician serving as a member of the Louisiana State Senate from the 29th district since 2016. A member of the Democratic Party, he represents parts of seven parishes in Central Louisiana. Before his election, Luneau practiced law in Alexandria, taught as an adjunct professor at Northwestern State University, and served as a magistrate judge in Ball.

== Early career ==
Luneau opened the Luneau Law Office in Alexandria, representing small businesses and individuals in workers’ compensation, personal injury, and damage claims. He has also served as an adjunct professor at Northwestern State University and as a magistrate judge in Ball.

== Louisiana Senate ==
=== District ===
District 29 encompasses communities in Central Louisiana, drawing territory from Bienville, Grant, Jackson, Lincoln, Natchitoches, Rapides, and Winn parishes. The seat includes sections of Alexandria, Pineville, Natchitoches, Ruston, and nearby towns such as Winnfield, Jonesboro, Arcadia, and Grambling, and has a majority-Black constituency.

=== Elections ===
Luneau first ran for office in 2015 after predecessor Rick Gallot declined to seek re-election. He won 59.34% of the vote in the October 24, 2015 jungle primary over Republican Joseph Dara.

He was re-elected in 2019 with 61.46% of the vote against Republican Randy Wiggins.

Luneau won a third term in 2024.

=== Legislation ===
In 2025, Luneau authored Senate Bill 11, which increased penalties for slow driving in the left lane.
