= Bryant Hammett =

Louisiana politician

Bryant O. Hammett Jr.

Member of the Louisiana House of Representatives from the 21st district
- In office 1992 – July 10, 2006
- Preceded by: Al Ater
- Succeeded by: Andy Anders

Personal details
- Born: September 30, 1956 (age 69)
- Party: Democratic
- Occupation: Politician, Civil engineer

Bryant O. Hammett Jr. (born September 30, 1956) is an American civil engineer and former politician who served as a member of the Louisiana House of Representatives from the 21st district. He represented District 21 from 1992 until resigning effective July 10, 2006.

After leaving the legislature, Hammett was appointed by Governor Kathleen Blanco as secretary of the Louisiana Department of Wildlife and Fisheries, beginning service in December 2006.

== Career ==
Hammett operated an engineering firm based in Ferriday and was licensed in Louisiana as a civil engineer and environmental engineer.

== Louisiana House of Representatives ==
Hammett served in the Louisiana House of Representatives from the 1992–1996 term through the 2004–2008 term, resigning in 2006. During his House tenure, he served on the Natural Resources Committee and chaired the Ways and Means Committee. He also chaired the House Rural Caucus.

Hammett resigned his seat effective July 10, 2006, creating a vacancy in House District 21 that was filled by special election.

== Louisiana Department of Wildlife and Fisheries ==
Following his resignation from the House, Hammett served on the governor’s disaster recovery team in the Office of Community Development, Louisiana Division of Administration, where he led infrastructure restoration efforts following Hurricanes Katrina and Rita.

He was appointed by Governor Kathleen Blanco as secretary of the Louisiana Department of Wildlife and Fisheries in 2006, replacing Dwight Landreneau. The Louisiana Civil Engineer reported that Hammett accepted the office on September 30, 2006 and was scheduled to begin service on December 4, 2006. The department’s 2005–2006 annual report lists Hammett as secretary and includes a letter signed by him in that capacity.

== Election results ==
Hammett first sought election to House District 21 in 1991. In the October 19, 1991, primary election, he led a three-candidate Democratic field, receiving 49.81 percent. Moses Junior Williams finished second with 31.67 percent, while Samuel Thomas received 18.51 percent. Hammett advanced to a runoff against Williams and won the November 16, 1991, election, receiving 52.61 percent, to Williams’s 47.39 percent, securing his first term representing District 21.

In the October 21, 1995, election for Louisiana House District 21, Bryant O. Hammett Jr., a Democrat, advanced to a runoff after leading a four-candidate field. Hammett received 46.69 percent, followed by fellow Democrat Sammy Davis Jr. with 37.67 percent. Republican Steve Fleming finished third with 14.02 percent, while Emerson Slain, listed as an other-party candidate, received 1.63 percent.

Hammett defeated Davis in the November 18, 1995, runoff election, winning 56.68 percent, to Davis’s 43.32 percent, securing election to the seat. He was re-elected in the October 23, 1999, election, again facing Sammy Davis Jr. Hammett won with 68.57 percent, while Davis received 31.43 percent. In 2003, Hammett was re-elected unopposed to another term in the Louisiana House of Representatives. He later resigned from the seat in July 2006.
