= Pinkie C. Wilkerson =

American politician and lawyer

Member of the Louisiana House of Representatives from the 11th district
- In office January 1, 1992 – August 1, 2000
- Preceded by: Constituency established
- Succeeded by: Rick Gallot

Personal details
- Born: February 8, 1948 Grambling, Lincoln Parish; Louisiana, USA
- Died: August 1, 2000 (aged 52) Bossier City, Bossier Parish, Louisiana, USA
- Party: Democratic
- Children: 1
- Education: Grambling State University (BA); Ohio University (MA); Southern University (JD); Tulane University (LLM)

Pinkie Carolyn Wilkerson (February 8, 1948 – August 1, 2000) was an American politician who served in the Louisiana House of Representatives in the 11th district from 1992 until her death on August 1, 2000.

== Biography ==
Wilkerson was born on February 8, 1948, in Grambling, Louisiana. She attended Grambling State University Lab High School and earned her bachelor's degree from Grambling State University. She earned a Master of Arts degree from Ohio University in Athens, a Juris Doctor from Southern University, and an L.L.M. from Tulane University.

Wilkerson began her law practice in Grambling in 1979. She then served as assistant district attorney in the 3rd Judicial District of Lincoln and Union parishes, and Assistant Attorney General for the State of Louisiana. From 1981 to 1984, she was an assistant professor at Southern University Law School.

== Louisiana House of Representatives ==
In 1992, Wilkerson began serving in the newly created 11th district of the Louisiana House of Representatives, which includes Claiborne Parish and parts of Bienville, Lincoln and Union parishes. She served as the Vice Chair of the Health & Welfare Committee, served on the Civil Law and Procedure and Judiciary Committees and was the first and only female chair of the Louisiana Legislative Rural Caucus. Wilkerson's focus in the legislature was on education, healthcare and social issues.

In 1993, Wilkerson sponsored legislation establishing a 24-hour statewide compulsive gamblers helpline, also having the number placed in gambling establishments and on lottery tickets. The same year, she passed legislation authorizing courts to issue restraining and protective orders for abused parents. Later, in 1995, Wilkerson passed legislation that included grandparents and grandchildren within the coverage of the family violence programs related to community-based shelters for victims of family violence.

Wilkerson introduced legislation to prohibit "drive-through mastectomies," to study the problem of providing prescription drugs to the indigent, and established an Incentive Award Program awarding parishes for reducing the drop-out and teen pregnancy rates. She also sponsored seminars and awareness programs on diabetes, cancer, lupus, and heart disease.

Wilkerson also initiated the Youth Academy 2000, which is a series of skill classes that provide opportunities for children to learn alongside professionals in such areas as science, computers, mathematics, medicine, music, and entrepreneurship.

== Death and legacy ==
Wilkerson was killed on August 1, 2000, in a multi-car accident while she was stopped at a highway construction site on Interstate-20 in Bossier City, Louisiana

After Wilkerson's death, the African American National Bar Association established an award in her name. The Delta Sigma Theta sorority established the Pinkie C. Wilkerson Life Development Center in Grambling. In 2015, House Bill 140 dedicated the interchange of I-20 and LA 49 at Grambling to Wilkerson.
