= Andy Anders =

American politician

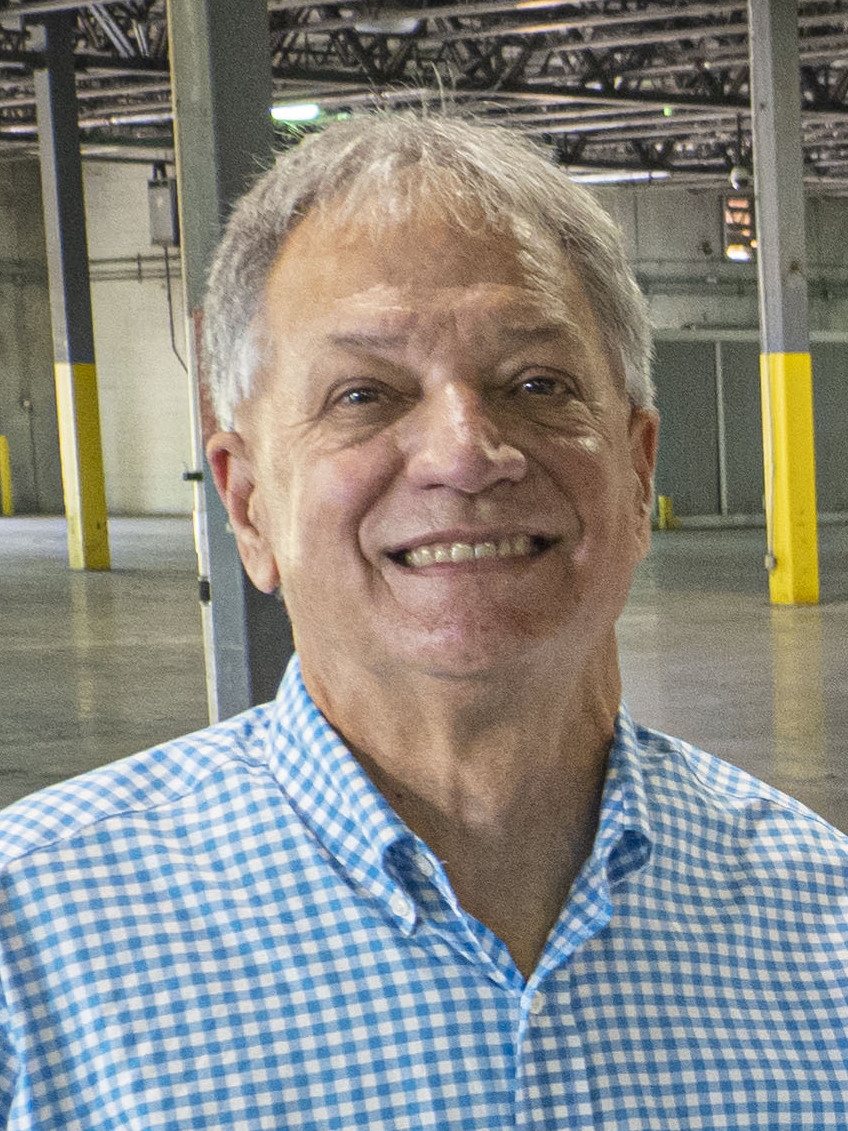

Member of the Louisiana House of Representatives from the 21st district
- In office October 2006 – January 2020
- Preceded by: Bryant Hammett
- Succeeded by: C. Travis Johnson

Personal details
- Born: John F. Anders
- Party: Democratic
- Children: 3
- Education: Louisiana Polytechnic Institute (BS)

John F. "Andy" Anders is an American politician, who served as a member of the Louisiana House of Representatives for the 21st district from 2006 to 2020.

== Education ==
Anders earned a Bachelor of Science degree in agribusiness from the Louisiana Polytechnic Institute in 1979.

== Career ==
In 2006, Anders was elected for the 21st district of the Louisiana House of Representatives. He succeeded Bryant Hammett. In 2020, Anders was succeeded by C. Travis Johnson. During his tenure in the House, Anders served as chair and vice chair of the Agriculture, Forestry, Aquaculture and Rural Development Committee.

Anders is currently the Concordia Parish Clerk of Court.
