= Kenneth Osterberger =

20th-century American politician

Member of the Louisiana State Senate
- In office 1972–1992
- Succeeded by: Jay Dardenne

Personal details
- Born: Kenneth Eli Osterberger; April 3, 1930
- Died: August 10, 2016 (aged 86)
- Party: Democratic; Republican
- Spouse: Harriet Osterberger
- Children: 2
- Education: Louisiana State University

Kenneth Eli Osterberger (April 3, 1930 – August 10, 2016) was an American politician. He served as a Democratic and later a Republican member of the Louisiana State Senate. In all, he served 20 years in the state senate from 1972 to 1992.

== Life and career ==
Kenneth Eli Osterberger was born April 3, 1930, the son of George Breazeale. He attended Louisiana State University, where he was a member of Lambda Chi Alpha and served as student body president from 1952 to 1953.

=== Korean War ===
Osterberger served in the United States Army during the Korean War. He was a second lieutenant.

=== Louisiana politics ===
In 1969, Osterberger was elected to the Metropolitan Council, the legislative branch of the City of Baton Rouge and Parish of East Baton Rouge, Louisiana, and was then selected by the members of the council to be President Pro Tempore, serving until 1972. In 1971 he was elected as a Democrat to the Louisiana State Senate for East Baton Rouge Parish; he was re-elected four times, in 1975 defeating David Duke in Duke's first run for public office and in 1983 and 1987 after changing his party affiliation to Republican. In 1992 he was succeeded by Jay Dardenne.

== Personal life and death ==
Osterberger was married twice, to Margaret Simmons and to Harriet Osterberger, and had four children. He died on August 10, 2016, of Alzheimer's disease, at the age of 86.
