= C. Travis Johnson =

Louisiana politician

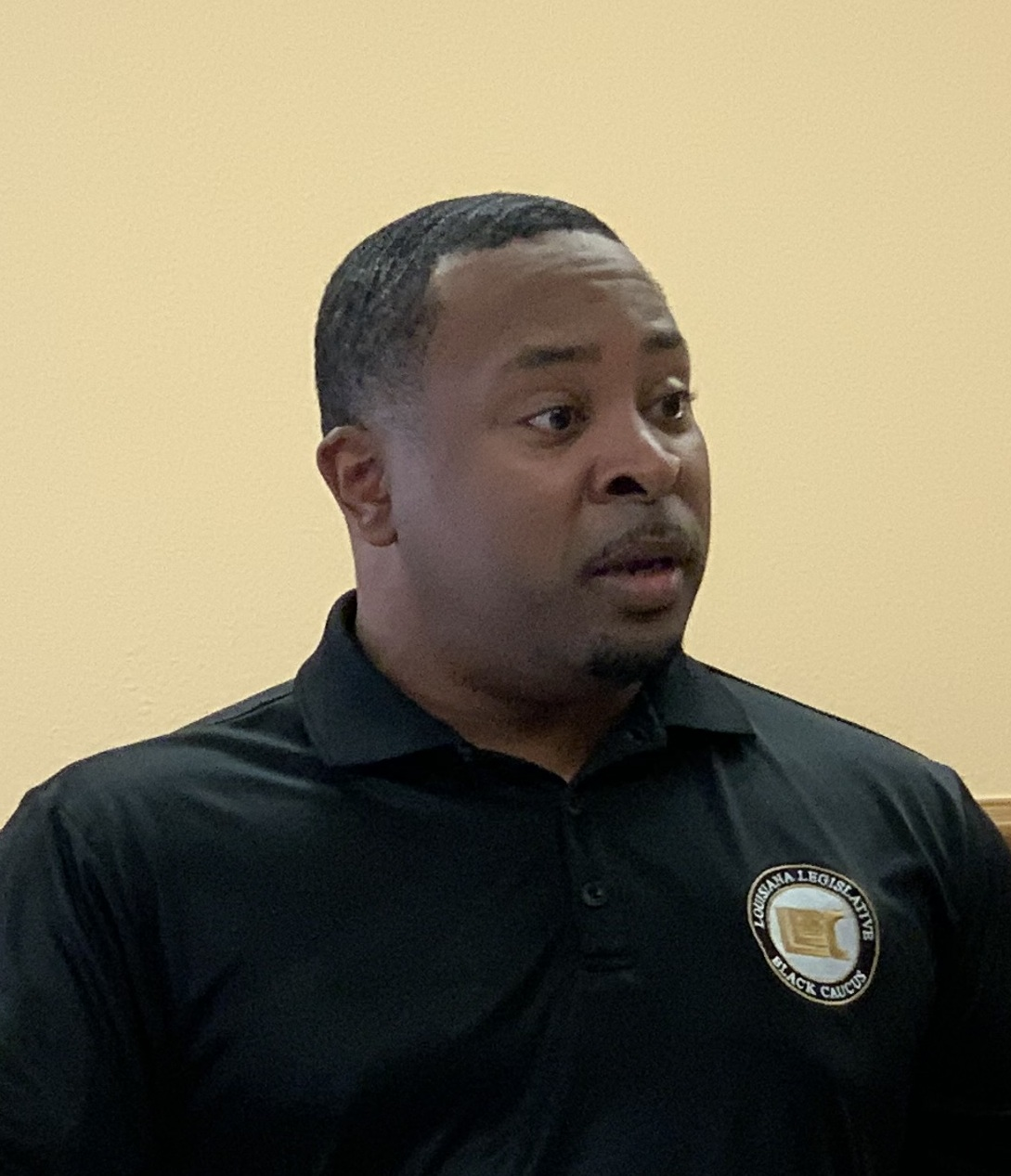

Member of the Louisiana House of Representatives from the 21st district
- Incumbent
- Assumed office January 13, 2020
- Preceded by: Andy Anders

Personal details
- Party: Democratic
- Education: Louisiana Tech University (BS); Belhaven University (MA)

C. Travis Johnson is an American politician serving as a member of the Louisiana House of Representatives from the 21st district. Elected on November 16, 2019, he assumed office on January 13, 2020.

== Early life and education ==
Johnson is a native of Ferriday, Louisiana. He earned a Bachelor of Science degree in economics and political science from Louisiana Tech University and a Master of Arts in public administration from Belhaven University.

== Career ==
Johnson served as the regional political director for Senator Mary Landrieu. In September 2020, Johnson became the vice chair of Louisiana's Democratic State Central Committee. He also owns a restaurant in Vidalia, Louisiana. Johnson was elected to the Louisiana House of Representatives on November 16, 2019, and assumed office on January 13, 2020.
