= W. Fox McKeithen =

American politician

Secretary of State of Louisiana
- In office December 1988 – July 15, 2005
- Governor: Buddy Roemer; Edwin Edwards; Mike Foster; Kathleen Blanco
- Preceded by: James H. "Jim" Brown
- Succeeded by: Al Ater

Louisiana State Representative from Caldwell, Franklin, Jackson, and Winn parishes
- In office 1984–1988
- Preceded by: Thomas "Bud" Brady
- Succeeded by: Noble Ellington

Personal details
- Born: Walter Fox McKeithen; September 8, 1946 Columbia, Louisiana, U.S.
- Died: July 16, 2005 (aged 58) Baton Rouge, Louisiana, U.S.
- Party: Republican (1989–2005)
- Other political affiliations: Democratic (before 1989)
- Parent: John McKeithen (father)
- Education: Louisiana Tech University (BA)
- Occupation: Educator; businessman

Walter Fox McKeithen (September 8, 1946 – July 16, 2005) served five terms as Secretary of State of Louisiana between 1988 and 2005. He is best known for merging the state's election divisions into one department and for the promotion of historical preservation.

== Early life and education ==
McKeithen was born in rural Columbia, Louisiana, to John Julian McKeithen and the former Marjorie Howell Funderburk. According to his tombstone, he was named for two World War II heroes, Walter Bennett and Elmer Fox. He graduated as class president in 1964 from Caldwell Parish High School, the same month in which his father was inaugurated as governor of Louisiana. One of his classmates was future associate justice of the Louisiana Supreme Court, Chet D. Traylor. McKeithen attended Louisiana Tech University in Ruston in Lincoln Parish to obtain a bachelor's degree in history and social studies.

After graduating from Louisiana Tech, McKeithen returned to Caldwell Parish High School, located off U.S. Route 165, as a civics teacher and coach. He also established three businesses in Caldwell Parish.

== Republican for Secretary of State, 1991 ==
In the summer of 1989, McKeithen switched to the Republican Party, whose chairman, Billy Nungesser Sr., had courted him for a possible 1990 campaign for the United States Senate against the Democrat J. Bennett Johnston, Jr. Upon making the party switch, the GOP helped McKeithen pay off $400,000 in campaign debts.

In subsequent elections, McKeithen was often endorsed by Democrats and worked well with members from both parties. His folksy manner meant that he was generally popular with voters despite adopting such unpopular positions as raising the pay of elected state officials.

== Death ==
Five months after suffering a paralyzing injury, McKeithen died on July 15, 2005—just hours after submitting his resignation as Secretary of State. He left his state pension to his wife, Yvonne Y. McKeithen.

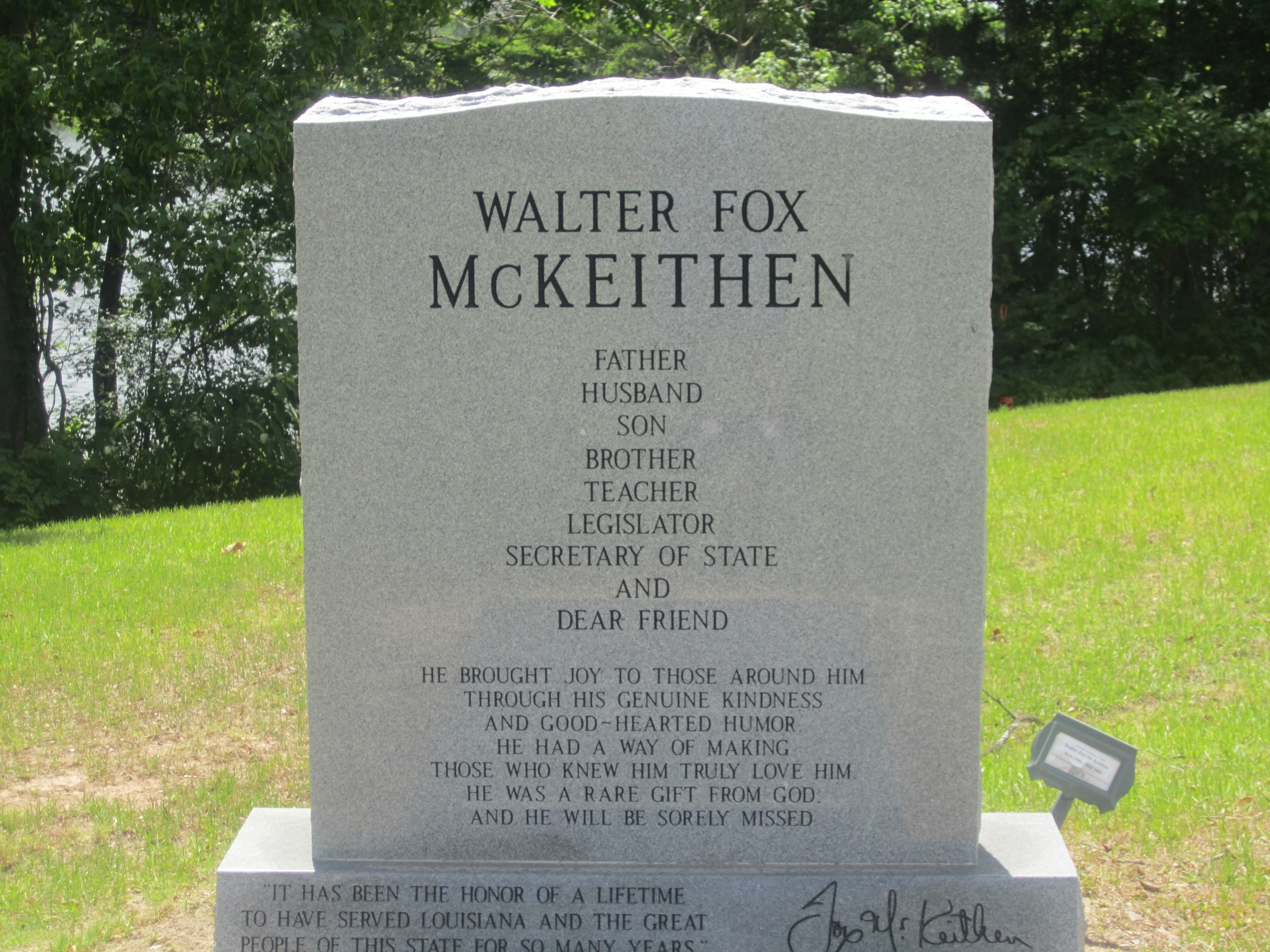
Fox McKeithen is interred beside his father, mother, and older brother at the private Hogan Cemetery off Louisiana Highway 559 in Caldwell Parish

== Legacy ==
In 2006, McKeithen was inducted posthumously into the Louisiana Political Museum and Hall of Fame in Winnfield, an honor that his father had procured in 1993, having been among the first thirteen honorees.

Party political offices
Vacant Title last held by Dick Bruce	Republican nominee for Secretary of State of Louisiana; 1991, 1995, 1999, 2003	Succeeded by Jay Dardenne
Louisiana House of Representatives
Preceded by Thomas "Bud" Brady	Louisiana State Representative from Caldwell, Franklin, Jackson, and Winn parishes 1984–1988	Succeeded by Noble Ellington
Political offices
Preceded by James H. "Jim" Brown	Louisiana Secretary of State; 1988–2005	Succeeded by Al Ater
