= Jamie Davis (politician) =

American political candidate (born 1970)

James Davis

Personal details
- Born: James Davis Jr. July 7, 1970 (age 56) Houston, Texas, U.S.
- Party: Democratic
- Spouse: Brenda
- Children: 4
- Education: Louisiana State University (attended)
- Website: Campaign website

James Davis Jr. (born July 7, 1970) is an American farmer and political candidate from Louisiana.

Davis was the Democratic nominee for the 2026 United States Senate election in Louisiana, challenging Republican Julia Letlow for an open seat, after outgoing Senator Bill Cassidy lost his primary election.

== Early life and education ==
Jamie Davis was born in Houston, Texas to parents from the Louisiana Delta, who returned there when he was a young child. He attended Waterproof High School. After graduating, he attended Louisiana State University to study electrical engineering in 1988, before dropping out during his sophomore year and returning to work on his family's farm.

== Political career ==
In 2015, Davis ran and was elected to the Tensas Parish police jury (a county-level government body specific to Louisiana), serving for 4 years before losing his reelection bid. In 2023, he ran unsuccessfully for State Representative in Louisiana's 21st District.

=== 2026 U.S. Senate campaign ===
As of 2026, no Black person had been elected to a statewide office in Louisiana since the Reconstruction Era following the Civil War.

Davis advanced from the Democratic primary runoff election on June 27, 2026, after winning every parish in Louisiana, which no Louisiana candidate for any office has ever done.

Davis opposes allowing elected officials to sign non-disclosure agreements, has criticized the 2026 Iran war, and has called for a moratorium on AI data centers. He calls for the enactment of the John Lewis Voting Rights Act, renewed federal government support for ACA subsidies, and a nationwide ban on partisan gerrymandering.

According to each of two polls conducted in July and September 2026, surveying 1018 likely voters in total, Davis trailed by 4 points to his Republican opponent. According to a poll of 502 likely voters by Hart Research on October 29-30, 2026, Davis and Letlow were tied at 45% support, with 10% of voters unsure of who they would vote for.

Davis lost the election to Letlow by just under 2% on November 3, 2026.

=== Following events ===
Davis has stated that he intends to run in either the 2027 Louisiana gubernatorial election or the 2028 United States Senate election in Louisiana.

== Personal life ==
In the 1990s, Jamie Davis's father, James Davis Sr., was able to purchase the land where his own father (Jamie's grandfather) had been a sharecropper.

Davis currently resides in Ferriday and owns a 3,200 acres (1,300 hectares) farm, growing corn, cotton, and soybeans.

Party political offices
Preceded by Adrian Perkins	Democratic nominee for U.S. Senator from Louisiana (Class 2); 2026	Most recent
