= Louisiana's 41st House of Representatives district =

American legislative district

Louisiana's 41st State House of Representatives district
Representative
| Phillip DeVillier; R–Eunice |

Louisiana's 41st House of Representatives district is one of 105 Louisiana House of Representatives districts. It is currently represented by Republican Phillip DeVillier of Eunice.

== Geography ==
HD41 includes the cities of Church Point and Eunice.

== Election results ==
| Year | Winning candidate | Party | Percent | Opponent | Party | Percent | Opponent | Party | Percent |
|---|---|---|---|---|---|---|---|---|---|
| 2011 | Mickey Guillory | Democratic | 100% | | | | | | |
| 2015 | Phillip DeVillier | Republican | 55.8% | Greg Fruge | Republican | 26.9% | Germaine Simpson | Democratic | 17.3% |
| 2019 | Phillip DeVillier | Republican | 100% | | | | | | |
| 2023 | Phillip DeVillier | Republican | Cancelled | | | | | | |
