= Al Ater =

American politician

Acting Secretary of State of Louisiana
- In office July 15, 2005 – November 10, 2006
- Governor: Kathleen Blanco
- Preceded by: W. Fox McKeithen
- Succeeded by: Jay Dardenne

Member of the Louisiana House of Representatives from the 21st district
- In office March 1984 – January 1992

Personal details
- Born: Alan Ray Ater; December 15, 1953 Decatur, Illinois, U.S.
- Died: May 21, 2017 (aged 63) Houston, Texas, U.S.
- Party: Democratic
- Education: Northwestern State University

Al Ater was an American politician in Louisiana. He served in the Louisiana House of Representatives and as Louisiana Secretary of State.

He served in the Louisiana House from 1984 until 1992. He was a Democrat. He was Louisiana's Secretary of State during Hurricane Katrina and its aftermath. He had a wife Susie and three children.
