= Hyperion Data Center =

Data center in Richland Parish, Louisiana, US

Coordinates: 32.477149°N 91.632333°W

- Image posted by Zuckerberg showing the construction plan for Hyperion superimposed on Manhattan
- Alternative names: Richland Parish Data Center; Project Sucre; Project Laidley flagship site; Franklin Farms megasite

General information
- Status: Under construction
- Location: Holly Ridge, Louisiana, United States
- Elevation: 0.03 km
- Year built: 2024–2032
- Cost: > US$50 billion
- Owner: Meta Platforms

Technical details
- Floor area: 4,000,000 sq ft (371,612 m^{2})

Website
- datacenters.atmeta.com/richland-parish-data-center/

The Richland Parish Data Center, nicknamed "Hyperion", is a planned artificial intelligence data center by Meta Platforms under-construction along Louisiana Highway 183 in Richland Parish, Louisiana, just outside of Holly Ridge. It is one of a number of "titan clusters" being built in preparation for the emergence of AI superintelligence. Modern technological researchers disagree as to whether or not superintelligence will ever exist, though Meta CEO Mark Zuckerberg has expressed belief that its creation is inevitable. Initial financing plans provided for at least $27 billion of investment. In July 2026, Meta announced the campus would expand to 5 gigawatts of compute capacity, nearly doubling the land area noted in the image posted by Zuckerberg showing the construction plan for Hyperion, raising planned investment to more than US$50 billion, with roughly 2 GW expected online by 2030 and full build-out around 2032.

== History ==
Meta was considering potential locations for their flagship data center in early 2024. Before being announced later in December, the plan was completely secret; meetings held between involved organizations and even government officials could only refer to it by the codename "Project Sucre" to protect it from potential corporate espionage. The data center was first announced on December 4, 2024, though its full scale was yet to be revealed. At first, Meta would not even claim responsibility for it, channelling all of its investments through the secret shell subsidiary Laidley LLC.

We set out looking for a place where we could expand into gigawatts pretty quickly, and really get moving within that community on a large plot of land very quickly. We looked at finding very, very large contiguous plots of land that had access to the infrastructure that we need, the energy that we needed, and could move very, very quickly for us.

— Rachel Peterson, Meta Vice President of Data Centers

The Louisiana-based Entergy Corporation, aiming for the facility to be built in its own backyard, negotiated a deal with the government of Louisiana to provide Meta with enormous tax breaks if they agreed to build Hyperion there. The Louisiana legislature responded by passing Act 730, which provides significant tax rebates on the purchase or lease of equipment for building and operating data centers. Meta found the arrangement acceptable, and bought a plot of land from the government. The government also had to further amend its laws to allow Meta to do this, as pre-existing policy forbade purchasing land directly from the government instead of hosting a public auction. The plot of land, originally called Franklin Farms, was purchased from the Franklin family in 2006 by the government, intending for it to be developed into an automotive manufacturing plant.

Greater attention was brought to Hyperion when Zuckerberg posted about the project on July 14, 2025, on Threads. The project subsequently caught media attention for its large size, as Zuckerberg's post portrayed the structure superimposed over Manhattan (pictured). The construction site spans 2,250 acres (9.1 km^{2}), with a total planned floor area of 4,000,000 square feet (371612 m^{2}) across the campus.

Meta initially reported the construction cost to be over $10 billion, but in October 2025, it announced a partnership with Blue Owl Capital providing for at least $27 billion. In July 2026, Meta announced a further expansion of the project, lifting its total planned investment above $50 billion. A Wall Street Journal investigation showed that although Meta is behind the project, it is owned through Beignet Investors, a special purpose vehicle managed by Blue Owl structured as an 80:20 joint venture where Meta is the minority partner and tenant so that the project is off-balance sheet. The construction is financed through a bond sale; lease payments will provide the cash flows to repay to bondholders. The initial four-year Hyperion lease is irrevocable and starts in 2029, renewable for up to 20 years, with bonds backed by a guarantee for the entire two decades. The company's aggregate initial lease commitment is about $12.3 billion.

== Operation ==
The facility is expected to consume up to 5 gigawatts (GW) of computational power, a figure Meta confirmed in July 2026 with roughly 2 GW expected online by 2030 and the full campus completed around 2032. As part of their deal made with Meta, Entergy plans to be able to produce at least 3.8 GW of electricity for the operation.

== Response to the project ==
Louisiana Governor Jeff Landry thanked Meta for their decision to build Hyperion in Louisiana, stating that it would "create opportunities for Louisiana workers to fill high-paying jobs of the future" and calling it "A New Chapter" for the state. The Louisiana Economic Development (LED) state agency further praised the project, citing Meta's estimate that it would create 1,500 jobs. Additionally, Richland Parish Supervisor Joey Evans stated that he was excited about the project.

As part of their agreement with Meta, Entergy announced their plan to increase electricity production state-wide. They say that this will result in the cost of energy reducing, though Entergy filings revealed in June 2025 that the cost of electricity would rise and be passed onto consumers. Meta also pledged to match all of Hyperion's power consumption with 100% environmentally friendly electricity production. So far, Entergy has begun building three gas-powered combined-cycle power plants and a substation (Note: the Smalling Substation, paid for by Meta) in response to the project.

Delta Community College announced in response to Hyperion's construction that it would expand its construction and trade programs.

In January 2025, Business Facilities Magazine selected Hyperion for its annual Deal of the Year Platinum Award for 2024.

Much of the initial backlash following Hyperion's announcement centered around the fast-tracked approval of the project by the state government, and skepticism around Meta's various claims (environmental friendliness, 100% renewable energy, local economic stimulation, price reductions). The Sierra Club criticized Meta for gentrifying the surrounding area, and was highly skeptical of their promise to keep it environmentally friendly. Environmental activist group Earthjustice attempted to have a subpoena of Meta approved to determine if they were compliant with environmental protection laws, though they were unsuccessful.

Many residents of Holly Ridge have been critical of the construction, complaining about the increased construction vehicle traffic and intense gentrification. Another point of contention is Meta's continued reliance on out-of-state contractors in the facility's construction in spite of their previous commitment to "hire as many local folk as [we] possibly can." In spite of Entergy's continual denial that the facility's construction could adversely affect the power grid, numerous electrical outages have been reported since construction began.

== See also ==
- Colossus (data center), data center in Memphis, Tennessee
