= 2025 in Louisiana =

- Decades: 2000s; 2010s; 2020s
- See also: History of Louisiana; Historical outline of Louisiana; List of years in Louisiana; 2025 in the United States

The following is a list of events of the year 2025 in Louisiana.

== Incumbents ==
=== State government ===
- Governor: Jeff Landry (R)

== Events ==
=== January ===
- January 1 —
  - A vehicle-ramming attack in New Orleans leaves at least sixteen people dead, including the perpetrator, and at least 35 injured.
  - House Bill 71 which requires public schools to display the Ten Commandments in every classroom take effect.

=== February ===
- February 9 — Super Bowl LIX is played at the Caesars Superdome in New Orleans.
- February 10 — Governor Jeff Landry announced that the state had finalized its new execution protocol, allowing executions to be carried out in Louisiana after 15 years (2010).

=== March ===
- March 18 – The state of Louisiana conducted its first execution in 15 years since 2010; the inmate executed, Jessie Hoffman Jr., was additionally the first to be executed by nitrogen gas in Louisiana, which became the second state after Alabama to conduct nitrogen gas executions.

=== May ===
- May 15 – The Nottoway Plantation, a historic plantation in Iberville Parish, catches fire, sustaining massive damage.
- May 16 – Ten inmates escape from a New Orleans jail through a tunnel dug in a wall. Three are recaptured the same day. All are eventually apprehended, with the last one taken into custody in October.

=== June ===
- June 16 – ICE agents arrest 80 people at the Delta Downs racetrack and casino near Vinton.
- June 20 – Mahmoud Khalil, a Columbia University student activist who was arrested by ICE and sent to a facility in Jena in March, is released after a federal judge orders he be freed.
- June 22 – The LSU Tigers win the 2025 NCAA Division I baseball tournament, beating the Coastal Carolina Chanticleers 5-3 in the College World Series.

=== August ===
- August 14 – Louisiana sues the online gaming platform Roblox, alleging the company does not do enough to protect children on the site from sexual predators.
- August 15 – New Orleans Mayor LaToya Cantrell is indicted on conspiracy by a federal grand jury over allegations that she tried to cover up a romantic relationship with her bodyguard.

=== September ===
- September 26 – Parts of Louisiana, Alabama, and Mississippi experience 911 outages. AT&T reports the outages were caused by fiber cuts made by "third-parties".

=== October ===
- October 8 – Derrick Groves, the last of ten inmates who escaped from the Orleans Justice Center in May, is apprehended in Atlanta, Georgia.
- October 11 – 2025 New Orleans mayoral election: City Councilmember Helena Moreno wins the mayoral race, receiving 55% of the vote and avoiding a runoff.

=== December ===
- December 1 – The United States Border Patrol begins an immigration operation called "Swamp Sweep" in New Orleans.
- December 23 – Trump announces that 350 National Guardsmen will be deployed to New Orleans.

== See also ==
- 2025 in the United States
