= Rick Gallot =

American politician

Richard J. Gallot, Jr.
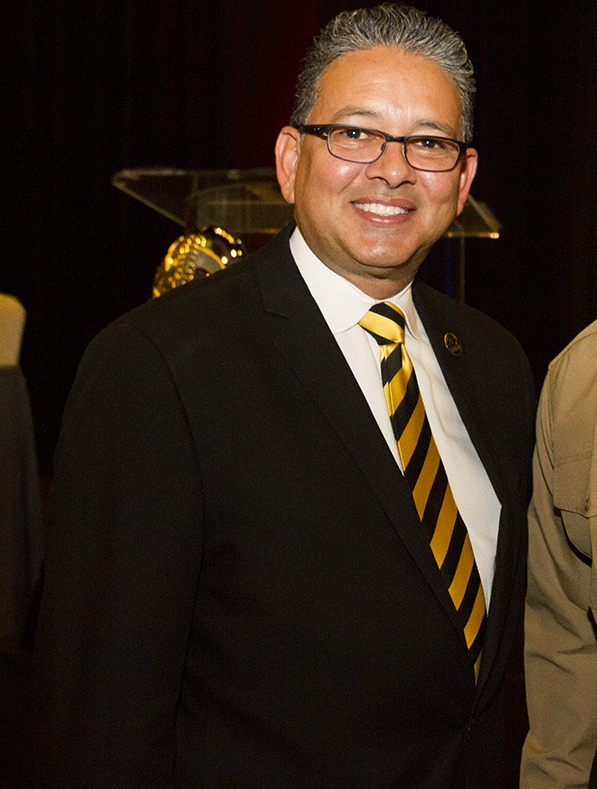
- Gallot in 2016

President of University of Louisiana System
- Incumbent
- Assumed office 2024

10th President of Grambling State University
- In office 2016–2024
- Preceded by: Willie Larkin

Member of the Louisiana Senate from the 29th district
- In office January 9, 2012 – January 2016
- Preceded by: Joe McPherson
- Succeeded by: Jay Luneau

Member of the Louisiana House of Representatives from the 11th district
- In office 2000–2012
- Preceded by: Pinkie C. Wilkerson
- Succeeded by: Patrick Jefferson

Personal details
- Born: April 1966 (age 60) Ruston, Lincoln Parish; Louisianan, USA
- Party: Democratic
- Spouse: Christy Cox Gallot
- Children: Four children
- Education: Grambling State University; Southern University Law Center
- Profession: Attorney

Richard Joseph Gallot Jr., known as Rick Gallot (born April 1966) was named president of the University of Louisiana System in October 2023 after serving nearly nine years as president of Grambling State Also he was a Democratic member of the Louisiana State Senate for District 29. In the nonpartisan blanket primary held on October 22, 2011, Gallot received 12,992 votes (50.3 percent).

Gallot, an African American born in Ruston, graduated from the historically black Grambling State University in Grambling and the Southern University Law Center of Baton Rouge. He is a member of Grambling's Gamma Psi chapter of Kappa Alpha Psi fraternity and an inductee of the Southern Law Hall of Fame. In 2012, he succeeded the term-limited white Democratic Senator Joe McPherson.

Despite a generally liberal voting record, in 2014 Gallot was one of only two Democrats in the State Senate to vote against reforming Louisiana's payday lending laws, having sided with the payday lending industry against a grassroots campaign that supported reform. Gallot did not seek reelection in the nonpartisan blanket primary held on October 24, 2015.

In April 2016, Gallot began serving on the Board of Directors of Cleco Corporation, an electric utility company based in Pineville, Louisiana.

Gallot was selected as president of Grambling State University and to begin his tenure, donated $20,000 to the institution noting, "I wouldn't ask anyone to do what I wouldn't do myself."

In October 2023, Gallot was named president of the University of Louisiana System.
