= 2023 in Louisiana =

- Decades: 2000s; 2010s; 2020s
- See also: History of Louisiana; Historical outline of Louisiana; List of years in Louisiana; 2023 in the United States

The following is a list of events of the year 2023 in Louisiana.

== Incumbents ==
=== State government ===
- Governor: John Bel Edwards (D)

== Events ==
- The Baton Rouge Zydeco hockey team are established.
- October 14 – November 18 – 2023 Louisiana elections
- October 23 – Seven people are killed and 25 others are injured in a multiple-vehicle collision on Interstate 55 near New Orleans. Police say the 158-car pile-up was caused by a dense fog.

== See also ==
- 2023 in the United States
