= 2026 Louisiana Amendment 5 =

2026 referendum

- May 16, 2026
- Increase Judicial Retirement Age to 75 Years Amendment

Results
| Choice | Votes | % |
|---|---|---|
| Yes | 188,782 | 23.39% |
| No | 618,183 | 76.61% |
| Valid votes | 806,965 | 100.00% |
| Invalid or blank votes | 0 | 0.00% |
| Total votes | 806,965 | 100.00% |

No
60–70%
70–80%
80–90%

Louisiana Amendment 5, also known as the Increase Judicial Retirement Age to 75 Years Amendment, was a legislatively referred constitutional amendment that appeared on the ballot in the U.S. state of Louisiana on May 16, 2026. The amendment failed.

== Ballot language ==
The ballot question read: "Do you support an amendment to change the mandatory retirement age for judges from seventy to seventy-five, provided that a judge may continue to serve to complete a term of office? (Amends Article V, Section 23(B))"

== Background and impact ==
In Louisiana, the mandatory retirement age for judges is 70 years old, after which a judge must step down from the bench. An amendment was introduced in the Louisiana State Legislature to raise that age to 75 by Kyle Green. It passed the House of Representatives 95–1 and the State Senate 31–3, surpassing the two-thirds requirement to place an amendment on the ballot.

== Provisions ==
Amendment 5 proposed amending Article V, Section 23(B) of the Constitution of Louisiana to increase the mandatory retirement age for judges from 70 to 75. Under the proposal, a judge could not remain in office beyond the judge's 75th birthday, except that a judge who reached 75 while serving a term would be allowed to complete that term.

== Endorsements ==
Yes

State legislators

- Kyle Green, minority leader and state representative from the 83rd district (2020–present) (Democratic)
- Jason Hughes, New Orleans City Councilmember (2026–present) and former state representative from the 100th district (2020–2025) (Democratic)
- Gregory A. Miller, state senator from the 19th district (2024–present) (Republican)

Newspapers

- The Times-Picayune/The New Orleans Advocate
No

State legislators

- Alan Seabaugh, state senator from the 31st district (2024–present) (Republican)

== Results ==
Amendment 5 was rejected, with 76.61% voting against the measure and 23.39% voting in favor.

Louisiana Amendment 5
| Choice | Votes | % |
|---|---|---|
| For | 188,782 | 23.39 |
| Against | 618,183 | 76.61 |
| Total | 806,965 | 100.00 |
Source: Secretary of State of Louisiana
