= Pelican Institute =

American free market think tank

The Pelican Institute
- Established: 2008
- Chair: Stephen M. Gelé
- Budget: Revenue: $3.54 million (2024); Expenses: $2.91 million (2024)
- Address: 400 Poydras St, Suite 900 New Orleans, LA 70130
- Location: New Orleans, Louisiana
- Website: www.pelicaninstitute.org

The Pelican Institute is a free market think tank headquartered in New Orleans, Louisiana. Kevin Kane founded the Pelican Institute in 2008 and served as the organization's president until his death in 2016. The Pelican Institute's goals include increased government transparency, lower taxes, and improved schools. The Institute's stated mission is "to conduct scholarly research and analysis that advances sound policies based on free enterprise, individual liberty, and constitutionally limited government." The Pelican Institute publishes policy studies and commentaries via their news outlet, The Pelican Post. Issues addressed include health care, state and federal spending, energy, environmental issues, poverty, and corruption. The group has a legal arm that engages in "liberty focused strategic litigation."
