= Julia Letlow =

American politician (born 1981)

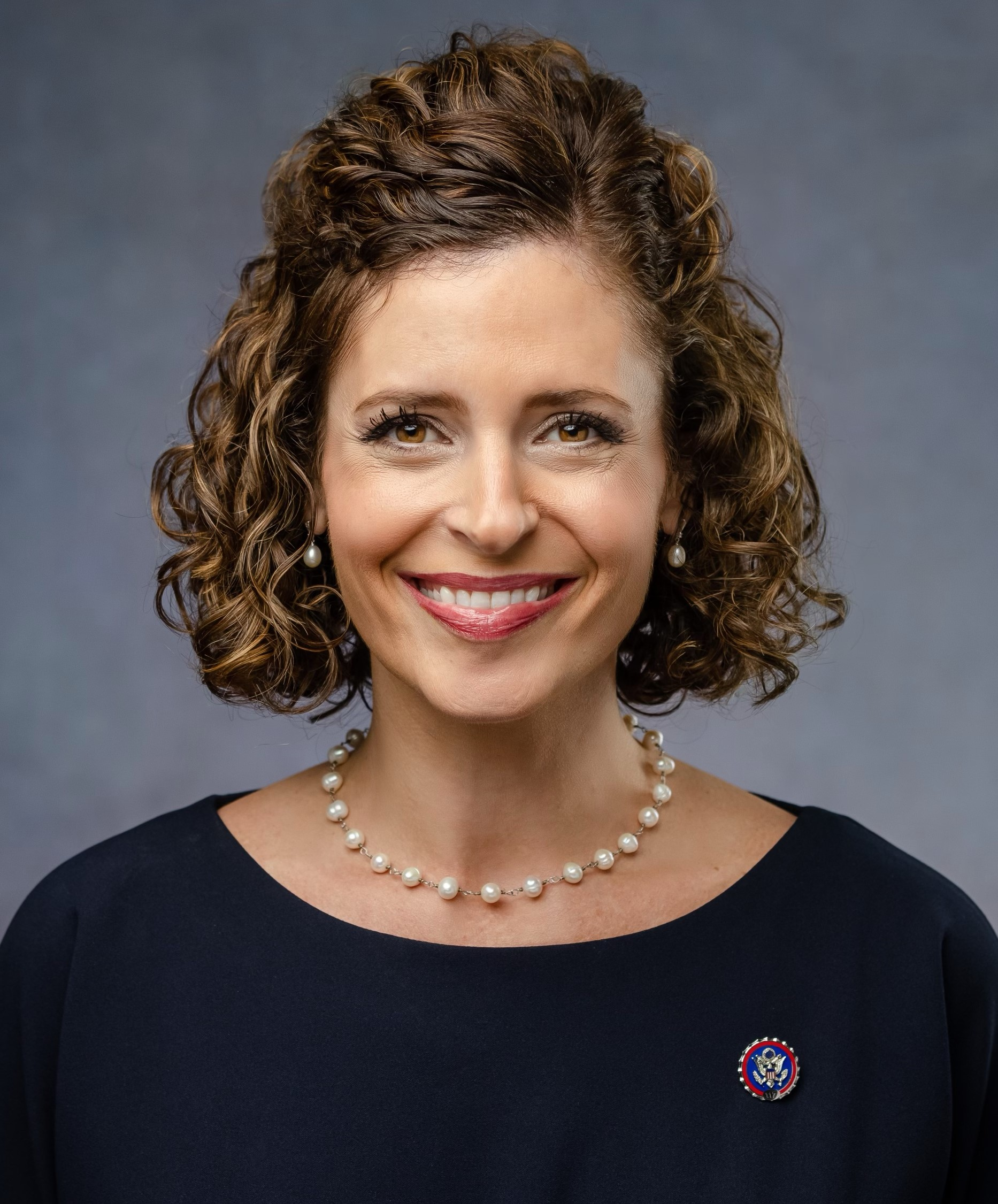
- Official portrait, 2021

United States Senator-elect from Louisiana
- Assuming office January 3, 2027
- Succeeding: Bill Cassidy

Member of the U.S. House of Representatives from Louisiana's 5th district
- Incumbent
- Assumed office March 20, 2021 (Note: Letlow's official service begins on the date of the special election, while she was not sworn in until April 14, 2021.)
- Preceded by: Ralph Abraham (Note: Letlow's husband, Luke Letlow, was elected to succeed retiring Abraham but died before taking office on December 29, 2020.)

Personal details
- Born: Julia Janelle Barnhill; March 16, 1981 (age 45) Monroe, Louisiana, U.S.
- Party: Republican
- Spouse: Luke Letlow (m. 2013; died 2020)
- Domestic partner: Kevin Ainsworth (engaged 2025)
- Children: 2
- Education: University of Louisiana, Monroe (BA, MA); University of South Florida (PhD)
- Website: House website Campaign website

Julia Janelle Letlow (/ˈlɛtloʊ/ LET-loh; née Barnhill; born March 16, 1981) is an American politician and academic administrator who is a United States senator-elect from Louisiana. A member of the Republican Party, she has served as the U.S. representative for Louisiana's 5th congressional district since 2021. Letlow is the first Republican woman to represent Louisiana in the House.

After receiving an early endorsement from Donald Trump, Letlow announced her candidacy in the 2026 U.S. Senate election in Louisiana, challenging Republican incumbent Bill Cassidy in the primary. Letlow defeated state Treasurer John Fleming in the runoff to win the Republican nomination. She narrowly defeated Democrat Jamie Davis in the general election, making her the first Republican woman elected to the Senate from Louisiana.

== Early life and career ==
Letlow was born Julia Janelle Barnhill on March 16, 1981, in Monroe, Louisiana. She was the middle child of Terry and Kathi Arneson Barnhill. Her father is a financial adviser. Her mother is a former flight attendant. She graduated from Ouachita Christian High School.

Letlow earned her Bachelor of Arts and Master of Arts in speech communications from the University of Louisiana at Monroe, followed by a Doctor of Philosophy in communications from the University of South Florida in 2012. Her doctoral advisor was Jane Jorgenson. Letlow's dissertation was titled Giving Meaning to Grief: the Role of Rituals and Stories in Coping with Sudden Family Loss. She dedicated it to her brother, Jeremy, who died in a car accident.

Letlow worked as director of education and patient safety for Tulane University School of Medicine. In 2018, she was named director of external affairs and strategic communications for the University of Louisiana at Monroe (ULM). In 2020, she was a finalist for the presidency of ULM.

== U.S. House of Representatives ==
=== Elections ===
==== 2021 special ====
Letlow's husband, Luke Letlow, was elected to the United States House of Representatives for Louisiana's 5th congressional district in the 2020 elections, but died from COVID-19 in December 2020, before taking office. Julia decided to run in the special election for the vacant seat in January 2021. During her campaign, she secured a number of high-profile endorsements, including one from former President Donald Trump. By the end of February, Letlow had raised $683,000, the most money raised by any candidate in the race. On March 20, she received over 64% of the vote in the nonpartisan blanket primary, winning the election outright and avoiding a runoff. Letlow is the first Republican woman elected to Congress from Louisiana.

==== 2022 ====
Letlow won reelection outright in 2022, winning 67% of the vote against three opponents.

==== 2024 ====
Letlow won reelection outright in Louisiana's November 5, 2024, primary with 62.9% of the vote against Michael Vallien Jr. and M. V. "Vinny" Mendoza.

=== Tenure ===
Letlow celebrates Meta's planned data center in Richland Parish, 2024

Letlow was sworn in on April 14, 2021. On January 3, 2025, she voted for Mike Johnson for Speaker of the House in the 119th Congress.

In June 2024, Letlow signed a non-disclosure agreement with a Meta subsidiary that concerned the company's planned $50 billion data center in Richland Parish, Louisiana. In October, she purchased shares of Meta and Nvidia, whose chips power Meta's data centers. Meta publicly announced the data center in December, and Letlow began selling the shares in January 2025.

She did not disclose the transactions until August 2025, more than six months after the required 45-day reporting deadline. Letlow said her broker made the trades without her knowledge or direction.

=== Committee assignments ===
- Committee on Appropriations
  - Subcommittee on Agriculture, Rural Development, Food and Drug Administration, and Related Agencies
  - Subcommittee on Labor, Health and Human Services, Education, and Related Agencies
  - Subcommittee on National Security, Department of State, and Related Programs
- Committee on Education and the Workforce

=== Caucus memberships ===
- Congressional Coalition on Adoption
- Climate Solutions Caucus
- Main Street Caucus
- Republican Governance Group

== 2026 U.S. Senate campaign ==
On January 20, 2026, Letlow announced that she would run for the U.S. Senate in 2026, challenging Republican incumbent Bill Cassidy. She won Trump's endorsement and defeated Cassidy in the primary, advancing to a runoff with state Treasurer John Fleming. On June 27, 2026, she defeated Fleming in the runoff and won the Republican nomination. She won the general election, becoming the first Republican woman elected to the Senate from Louisiana.

== Political positions ==
=== Immigration ===
In mid-2021, Letlow released a statement criticizing the Biden administration for "immigration detainees being released" in Louisiana, writing, "I join my fellow members of the Louisiana delegation in demanding a thorough and complete explanation of this situation and urge the Administration to stop these releases immediately".

=== Infrastructure ===
In July 2021, Letlow told KNOE-TV that there was "Nothing like a pandemic to bring to light how vital rural broadband is to our district", and said that rural broadband can provide better access to quality healthcare and education. Of the infrastructure plan proposed by Joe Biden, Letlow said, "You know, it's the political football...I really want to make sure that that infrastructure bill addresses true infrastructure needs. Roads, bridges, ports, rural broadband. Cut the other part out."

=== Iran war ===
In March 2026, Letlow opposed a war powers resolution that would have limited the 2026 Iran war. She voted against another war powers resolution on the Iran war in June 2026.

=== 2020 presidential election ===
Letlow said she would have joined the majority of Republican representatives in objecting to the results of the 2020 presidential election in Congress had she been in office at the time.

=== Education ===
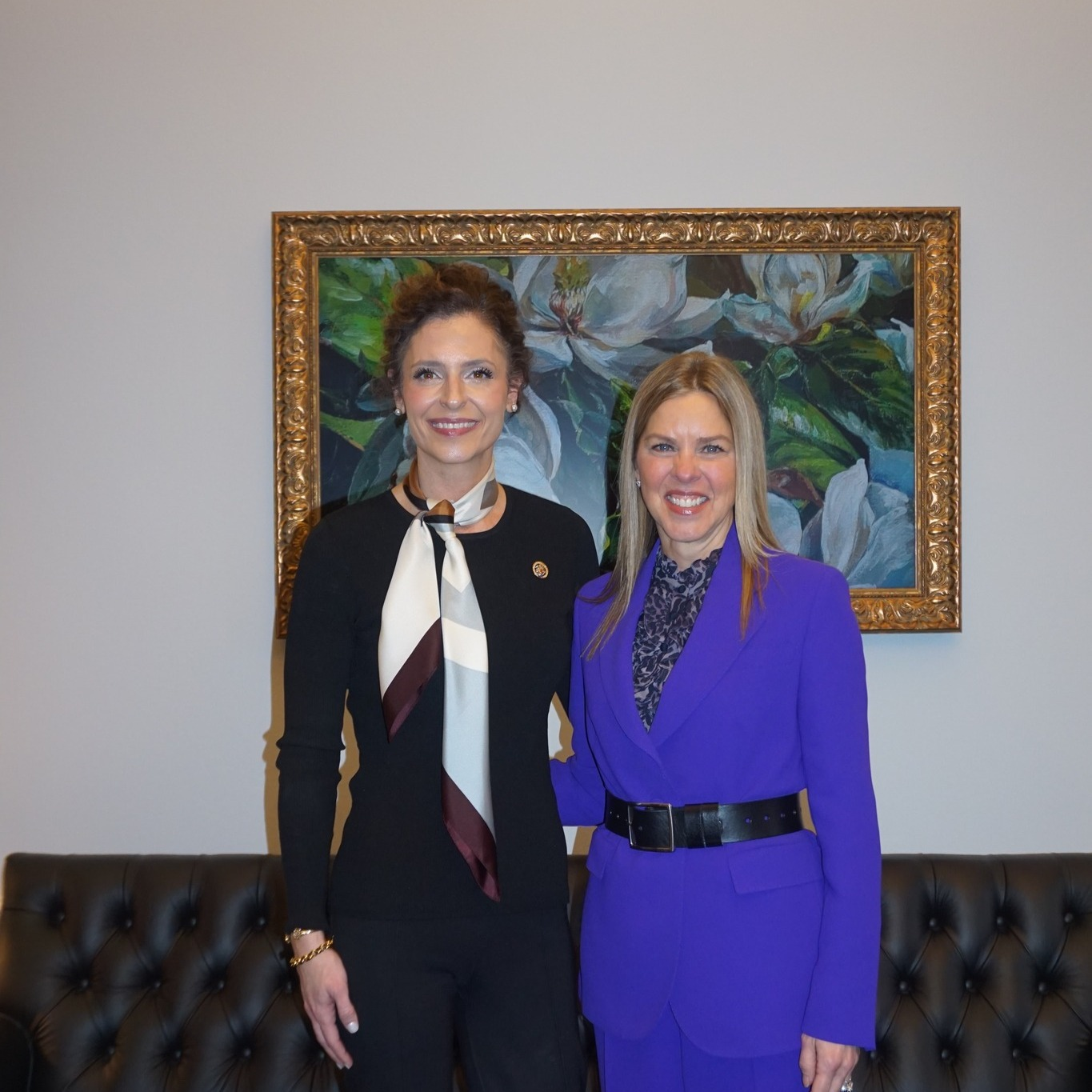
Letlow with Suzanne Youngkin

Letlow authored a Parents Bill of Rights that passed the U.S. House in March 2023. The measure was introduced as H.R. 5 in the 118th Congress and passed the House on March 24, 2023. The bill would give parents more oversight over what is taught in public schools. It would require school districts to make curricula public, provide parents with information on available library materials, allow parents to address school boards, require public disclosure of school budgets, and require parental consent prior to any physical or mental medical exams taking place at school.

== Personal life ==
Julia went to high school with Luke Letlow in the late 1990s; they married in 2013. They had two children together before his sudden death in 2020. Letlow addressed vaccine hesitancy among Republicans and encouraged them to get the COVID-19 vaccine, invoking her husband's death from the virus. In 2025, Letlow announced her engagement to Kevin Ainsworth, a lawyer and lobbyist from Baton Rouge.

Letlow is a Presbyterian.

== Electoral history ==
2021 Louisiana's 5th congressional district special election
Party	Candidate	Votes	%
Republican	Julia Letlow	67,203	64.86
Democratic	Sandra "Candy" Christophe	28,255	27.27
Republican	Chad Conerly	5,497	5.31
Republican	Robert Lansden	929	0.90
Republican	Allen Guillory	464	0.45
Independent	Jim Davis	402	0.39
Republican	Sancha Smith	334	0.32
Republican	M.V. "Vinny" Mendoza	236	0.23
Independent	Jaycee Magnuson	131	0.13
Republican	Richard H. Pannell	67	0.06
Republican	Horace Melton III	62	0.06
Republican	Errol Victor Sr.	36	0.03
Total votes		103,616	100.00
Republican hold			

Louisiana's 5th congressional district, 2022
Party	Candidate	Votes	%
Republican	Julia Letlow (incumbent)	151,080	67.6
Democratic	Oscar "Omar" Dantzler	35,149	15.7
Democratic	Walter Earl Huff	19,383	8.7
Republican	Allen Guillory	12,159	5.4
Republican	Hunter Pullen	5,782	2.6
Total votes		223,553	100.0
Republican hold			

Louisiana's 5th congressional district, 2024
Party	Candidate	Votes	%
Republican	Julia Letlow (incumbent)	201,037	62.9
Democratic	Michael Vallien Jr.	82,981	25.9
Republican	Vinny Mendoza	35,833	11.2
Total votes		319,851	100.0
Republican hold			

U.S. House of Representatives
Preceded by Ralph Abraham (Note: Luke Letlow was elected in the 2020 general election, but died before the beginning of the Congressional term.)	Member of the U.S. House of Representatives from Louisiana's 5th congressional district 2021–present	Incumbent
Party political offices
Preceded by Bill Cassidy	Republican nominee for U.S. Senator from Louisiana (Class 2); 2026	Most recent
U.S. Senate
Preceded by Bill Cassidy	U.S. Senator (Class 2) from Louisiana; Taking office 2027; Served alongside: John Kennedy	Elect
U.S. order of precedence (ceremonial)
Preceded by Nikema Williams	United States representatives by seniority 280th	Succeeded by Troy Carter
