= 2024 in Louisiana =

- Decades: 2000s; 2010s; 2020s
- See also: History of Louisiana; Historical outline of Louisiana; List of years in Louisiana; 2024 in the United States

The following is a list of events of the year 2024 in Louisiana.

== Incumbents ==
=== State government ===
- Governor until January 7: John Bel Edwards (D)
- Governor from January 8: Jeff Landry (R)

== Events ==
- January 8 – Jeff Landry becomes Governor of Louisiana.
- March 5 – Louisiana Governor Jeff Landry signs a bill that adds nitrogen gas and electrocution as execution methods.
- April 26 - The Louisiana Supreme Court rules 4–3 in favor of predominantly White St. George, Louisiana leaving Baton Rouge, Louisiana.
- June 19 – Louisiana Governor Jeff Landry signs a bill that makes it the first state to mandate that the Ten Commandments be displayed in every public school classroom.
- November 17 – Two people are killed and nine others are injured in two shooting incidents near a parade route in New Orleans.

== See also ==
- 2024 in the United States
