= Louisiana's 29th State Senate district =

American legislative district

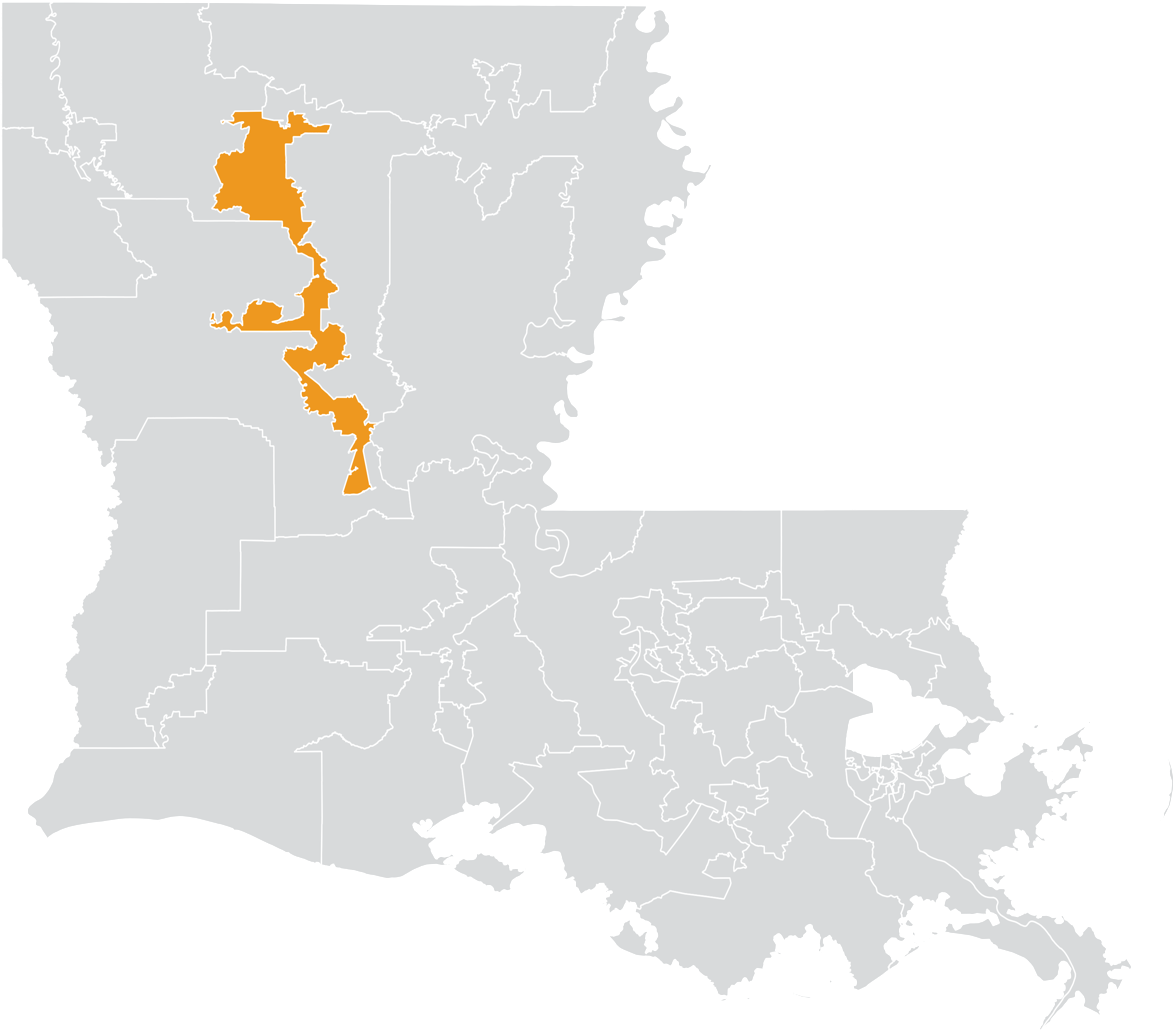
Senator
Jay Luneau; D–Alexandria
- Registration: 55.5% Democratic; 19.6% Republican; 24.9% No party preference
- Demographics: 37% White; 58% Black; 3% Hispanic; 0% Asian; 1% Other
- Population (2019): 113,088
- Registered voters: 67,320

Louisiana's 29th State Senate district is one of 39 districts in the Louisiana State Senate. It has been represented by Democrat Jay Luneau since 2016, succeeding fellow Democrat Rick Gallot.

== Geography ==
District 29 covers a narrow majority-black swath of Central Louisiana, incorporating parts of Bienville, Grant, Jackson, Lincoln, Natchitoches, Rapides, and Winn Parishes. The district snakes its way through much of Alexandria, Pineville, Natchitoches, Winnfield, Jonesboro, Arcadia, Grambling, and Ruston.

The district overlaps with Louisiana's 4th and 5th congressional districts, and with the 11th, 13th, 22nd, 23rd, 25th, 26th, and 27th districts of the Louisiana House of Representatives.

== Recent election results ==
Louisiana uses a jungle primary system. If no candidate receives 50% in the first round of voting, when all candidates appear on the same ballot regardless of party, the top-two finishers advance to a runoff election.

=== 2019 ===
2019 Louisiana State Senate election, District 29
Party	Candidate	Votes	%
Democratic	Jay Luneau (incumbent)	16,196	61.5
Republican	Randy Wiggins	10,158	38.5
Total votes		26,354	100
Democratic hold			

=== 2015 ===
2015 Louisiana State Senate election, District 29
Party	Candidate	Votes	%
Democratic	Jay Luneau	13,462	59.3
Republican	Joshua Dara	9,225	40.7
Total votes		22,687	100
Democratic hold			

=== 2011 ===
2011 Louisiana State Senate election, District 29
Party	Candidate	Votes	%
Democratic	Rick Gallot	12,992	50.3
Republican	Tony Vets	7,579	29.3
Democratic	Mary Wardsworth	5,271	20.4
Total votes		25,842	100
Democratic hold			

=== Federal and statewide results ===
Year	Office	Results
2020	President	Biden 61.1–37.1%
2019	Governor (runoff)	Edwards 69.1–30.9%
2016	President	Clinton 60.2–36.9%
2015	Governor (runoff)	Edwards 72.0–28.0%
2014	Senate (runoff)	Landrieu 62.3–37.7%
2012	President	Obama 62.3–36.6%
