= List of University of Louisiana at Lafayette people =

This is a list of University of Louisiana at Lafayette people, alumni or faculty affiliated with the University of Louisiana at Lafayette, a public research university in Lafayette, Louisiana. To be included in this list, the person must demonstrate notability by having a Wikipedia article, and the article must state their connection to the school.

== Alumni ==
=== Academia, scholars ===
- Barry Jean Ancelet (born 1951), ULL faculty since 1977; ULL alumni, graduated in 1974; folklorist of Cajun culture and expert on Cajun music and language
- Carl A. Brasseaux (born 1951), historian, helped pioneer the field of Cajun history; University of Louisiana at Lafayette professor and director of the Center for Louisiana Studies and the Center for Eco-Tourism, also an alumnus
- Irene Whitfield Holmes (1900–1993), ethnomusicologist, educator, and significant collector of Cajun, Creole, and Louisiana French folk songs
- Ann Metzinger (1931–2022), ULL class of 1951; public health researcher and nutritionist who taught at Tulane University for 42 years
- Stephen Webre (1946–2022), historian, William Y. Thompson Endowed Professor at Louisiana Tech University

=== Actors, models ===
- Felecia Angelle (born 1986), voice actress affiliated with Funimation
- Judith Ford (born 1949), beauty pageants, Miss America 1969
- Adrianne Frost (born 1978), comedian, author, and actress
- Leigh Hennessy, film stuntwoman, former trampoline champion
- Ali Landry (born 1973), Miss USA 1996, actress, model
- Monty Lopez (born 1975), actor, entrepreneur, online celebrity
- Richard Simmons (1948–2024), television personality, exercise guru; transferred to and graduated from Florida State University
- Daniel Sunjata (born 1971), film, television and theater actor, Tony Award nominee, winner of Theatre World Award in 2003

=== Artists, designers ===
- Rob Guillory, comic book artist, writer
- Gregory Krikko Obbott, Nigerian-American artist and architect
- George Rodrigue (1944–2013), artist known for his "Blue Dog" painted series and early art depicting Cajun life
- Floyd Sonnier (1933–2002), Cajun pen and ink artist
- Keith Sonnier (1941–2002), Postminimalist sculptor, performance artist, video and light artist
- A. Hays Town (1903–2005), architect

=== Filmmakers ===
- Royd Anderson, filmmaker
- Marc Breaux, choreographer of movies such as Mary Poppins, The Sound of Music, Chitty Chitty Bang Bang
- Saad Khan, film director, screenwriter and acting teacher; founder of FirstAction Studios

=== Journalists ===
- David Begnaud, journalist and news correspondent
- Isiah Carey, television news reporter (KRIV, Houston, Texas)
- Farooq Kperogi, journalist, media scholar at Kennesaw State University

=== Musicians ===
- D'Jalma Garnier (born 1954), musician, composer, he is best known for Creole and Cajun fiddle
- Frank Ocean (born 1987), singer, songwriter, record producer, photographer, and visual artist
- Eddy Raven, singer and songwriter; six no. 1 songs on the country music charts

=== Writers, poets ===
- James Lee Burke, novelist, writer; The Lost Get-Back Boogie was nominated for a Pulitzer Prize
- Wiley Cash, author
- Kody Chamberlain, comic book writer
- Hedwig Gorski, poet, author
- Gary Lavergne, non-fiction novelist

=== Law, government, and politics ===
- Scott Angelle, former U.S. director of Bureau of Safety and Environmental Enforcement (2017–2021); former member of the Louisiana Public Service Commission (2013–2017); lieutenant governor of Louisiana (2010); Louisiana Secretary of Natural Resources (2004–2012) (R)
- Lottie Beebe, former superintendent of St. Martin Parish School Board; former member of the Louisiana Board of Elementary and Secondary Education for District 3 (R)
- Charlotte Beers, former undersecretary of state for public diplomacy and public affairs (2001–2003)
- Kathleen Babineaux Blanco (deceased), Louisiana governor (2004–2008), lieutenant governor of Louisiana (1996–2004), member of the Louisiana Public Service Commission (1986–1996); Louisiana representative from the 45th District (1984–1989) (D)
- Charles Boustany, former U.S. representative from Louisiana's 3rd congressional district (2013–2017); former U.S. representative from Louisiana's 7th congressional district (2005–2013) (R)
- John Breaux, former U.S. senator (1987–2005); former U.S. representative from Louisiana's 7th congressional district (1972–1987) (D)
- Jefferson Caffery (deceased), former U.S. ambassador to Egypt, France, Brazil, Cuba, Colombia, and El Salvador (1926–1933, 1933–1955); U.S. assistant secretary of state (1933)
- Patrick T. Caffery (deceased), former U.S. representative from Louisiana's 3rd congressional district (1969–1973); Louisiana state representative from Iberia Parish (1964–1968) (D)
- Thomas G. Clausen (deceased), last elected state superintendent of education, 1984–1988; received bachelor's degree from ULL (D)
- Page Cortez, former Louisiana state senator for Lafayette Parish (District 23) (2012–2024) and president of the Louisiana Senate (2020–2024); former Louisiana state representative from Lafayette Parish (District 43) (2008–2012) (R)
- Cindy Courville, 1st U.S. ambassador to the African Union (2006–2008); director of African Affairs at the National Security Council (2001–2003)
- Jesse C. Deen, member of the Louisiana House of Representatives from 1972 to 1988
- James "Jimmy" Domengeaux (deceased), former U.S. representative from Louisiana's 3rd congressional district (1941–1944), Louisiana state representative from Lafayette Parish (1940) (D)
- Gil Dozier (deceased), Louisiana Commissioner of Agriculture and Forestry 1976–1980; graduated from ULL and played basketball for the Ragin' Cajuns prior to 1956 (D)
- Joey Durel, former mayor-president of City of Lafayette and Lafayette Parish (2004–2016) (R)
- William T. Dzurilla, international attorney and law clerk to Justice Byron White of the United States Supreme Court (1982–1983)
- Julie Emerson, Louisiana state representative for District 39 (2016–present) (R)
- Lether Frazar (deceased), former lieutenant governor of Louisiana (1956–1960); Louisiana state representative for Beauregard Parish (1936–1940) (D)
- Richard T. Haik, Class of 1971, United States district judge for the Western District of Louisiana, based in Lafayette (1991–2015); judge of the Louisiana 16th Judicial District (1984–1991)
- Ted Haik, former member of the Louisiana House of Representatives for District 49 (1976–1996) (D)
- Paul Hardy, former lieutenant governor of Louisiana (1988–1992); Louisiana Secretary of State (1976–1980); Louisiana state senator for Iberia and St. Martin Parishes (1972–1976) (R)
- Jimmy Hayes, former U.S. representative from Louisiana's 7th congressional district (1987–1997) (R)
- David Heitmeier, former Louisiana state senator for District 7 (Orleans Parish) (2008–2016) (D)
- Donald E. Hines (deceased), former Louisiana state senator from Avoyelles Parish (1993–2008); president of the Senate (2004–2008) (D)
- Mike "Pete" Huval, former Louisiana state representative from District 46 (2011–2024); former member of St. Martin Parish Council from District 4 (1996–2011) (R)
- Jeff Landry, 57th governor of Louisiana (2024–present), 45th Attorney General of Louisiana (2016–2024), U.S. representative from Louisiana's 3rd congressional district (2011–2013) (R)
- Dudley J. LeBlanc (deceased), former Louisiana state senator for Vermillion and Acadia parishes (1940–1944; 1948–1952; 1964–1971); president pro tempore of the Louisiana State Senate (1948–1952); Louisiana Public Service Commissioner (1926–1932); Louisiana state representative for Vermillion Parish (1924–1926) (D)
- Charlie Melancon, former Louisiana Secretary of Department of Wildlife and Fisheries (2016); former U.S. representative from Louisiana's 3rd congressional district (2005–2011); former Louisiana representative for District 60 (1987–1993) (D)
- Roderick Miller (deceased), former Louisiana state representative for Lafayette Parish (1966–1968) (R)
- Ellen Bryan Moore (deceased), former Louisiana Register of State Lands (1952–1956, 1960–1976) (D)
- Robert L. Mouton (deceased), former U.S. representative from Louisiana's 3rd congressional district (1937–1941), mayor of Lafayette, Louisiana (1919–1927; 1931–1935) (D)
- Sandra Peuler, Utah's Third District Court judge in Salt Lake City, former chief judge of Utah Third District Court (2001–2007)
- Ed Rand (deceased), Louisiana state representative from Rapides Parish (1960–1964) (D)→
- Joel Robideaux, former Lafayette, Louisiana City-Parish president (2016–2020), former speaker pro tempore of the Louisiana House of Representatives (2010–2012), former Louisiana state representative for District 45 (2004–2016) (R)
- Craig Romero, former Louisiana state senator for District 22 (1993–2008), president of the Iberia Parish Commission (1984–1992) (R)
- Tom Schedler, former secretary of state for Louisiana (2010–2018), former Louisiana state senator from District 11 (1996–2008), member of the Slidell City Council from District F (1990–1996) (R)
- Sam H. Theriot, member of the Louisiana House of Representatives from Vermilion Parish (1979–1996) (D)
- J. Emile Verret (deceased), former lieutenant governor of Louisiana (1944–1948) (D)

=== Military ===
- Steven L. Bennett, posthumous recipient of the Medal of Honor and Purple Heart in the Vietnam War
- Charles B. DeBellevue, first Air Force weapon systems officer to become a flying "Ace" and most successful American flying ace of the Vietnam War
- Jefferson J. DeBlanc, World War II ace fighter pilot and Medal of Honor recipient
- Bennett Landreneau, major general, director of the Louisiana Office of Homeland Security and Emergency Preparedness
- Felix "Gene" Moncla, Jr., US Air Force pilot who disappeared over Lake Superior in 1953
- Clifford Schoeffler (deceased), former brigadier general, United States Air Force
- Brod Veillon, brigadier general, assistant adjutant general-air for Louisiana

=== Science and technology ===
- Meredith Blackwell, biologist, mycologist, former president of the Mycological Society of America and former president of the International Mycological Association
- Albert H. Crews, former U.S. astronaut (1962–1988)
- Jay F. Honeycutt, former director of the Kennedy Space Center
- Alex McCool, manager of NASA Space Shuttle Projects Office (1960–)
- Wilma Subra, environmentalist, 1999 MacArthur Fellow

=== Religion ===
- Roy Bourgeois, priest; founder of the human rights group SOA Watch (1990–)
- Sam Seamans, bishop, Reformed Episcopal Church

=== Sports ===
==== American football ====
- Michael Adams, cornerback, Arizona Cardinals (2007–2012), Tampa Bay Buccaneers (2013)
- Louis Age, offensive tackle, Chicago Bears (1992)
- Patrise Alexander, linebacker, Washington Redskins (1996–1998), Philadelphia Eagles (1999)
- James Atkins, offensive tackle, Seattle Seahawks (1994–1997), Baltimore Ravens (1998–1999), Detroit Lions (2000)
- D'Anthony Batiste, offensive tackle, Carolina Panthers (2006), Atlanta Falcons (2007–2008), Washington Redskins (2008–2009), Denver Broncos (2009–2010), Arizona Cardinals (2010–2012), Pittsburgh Steelers (2013)
- Bill Bentley, cornerback, Detroit Lions (2012–2015)
- Bill Blackburn (deceased), center, Chicago Cardinals (1946–1950)
- C. C. Brown, safety, Houston Texans (2005–2008), New York Giants (2009), Detroit Lions (2010), Jacksonville Jaguars (2011)
- Chris Cagle (deceased), halfback, New York Giants (1930–1932), Brooklyn Dodgers (1933–1934), College Football Hall of Fame (1954)
- Anthony Clement, offensive tackle, Arizona Cardinals (1998–2005), San Francisco 49ers (2005), New York Jets (2006–2007),
- Kenyon Cotton (deceased), running back, Baltimore Ravens (1997–1998)
- Richie Cunningham, place kicker, Dallas Cowboys, Carolina Panthers, Jacksonville Jaguars (1997–2002)
- Joe DeForest, linebacker, New Orleans Saints (1987)
- Jake Delhomme, quarterback, New Orleans Saints (1998–2002), Carolina Panthers (2003–2009), Cleveland Browns (2010), Houston Texans (2011)
- Michael Desormeaux, quarterback, Jacksonville Jaguars (2009), Calgary Stampede (2009), currently serving as the university's head football coach
- Tyrell Fenroy, running back; Chicago Bears (2009); school, state and Sun Belt Conference all-time leading rusher; one of eight NCAA FBS players with four consecutive 1,000 yd seasons
- Chris Gannon, defensive line, San Diego Chargers (1989), New England Patriots (1990–1993)
- Ladarius Green, tight end, San Diego Chargers (2013–2015), Pittsburgh Steelers (2016)
- Mark Hall, defensive end, Green Bay Packers (1989–1990)
- Kyries Hebert, defensive back, Minnesota Vikings (2002), Houston Texans (2002), Tampa Bay Buccaneers (2005), Cincinnati Bengals (2008–2010)
- Keno Hills, tackle, New Orleans Saints (1996–1998), Chicago Bears (1999), Miami Dolphins (2000)
- Weldon Humble (deceased), offensive lineman, Cleveland Browns (1947–1950), Dallas Texans (1952), College Football Hall of Fame (1961)
- Elvis Joseph, running back, Jacksonville Jaguars (2001–2002)
- Randy McClanahan, linebacker, Oakland Raiders (1977), Buffalo Bills (1978), Oakland/Los Angeles Raiders (1980–1982)
- Elijah McGuire, running back, New York Jets (2017–2018), Cleveland Browns (2019), Kansas City Chiefs (2019–2020, 2021–present), Dallas Cowboys (2020), Miami Dolphins (2020)
- Brian Mitchell, running back, Washington Redskins (1990–1999), Philadelphia Eagles (2000–2002), New York Giants (2003)
- Elijah Mitchell, running back, San Francisco 49ers (2021-present)
- Donovan Morgan, wide receiver, New York Jets (2004), Houston Texans (2005), Kansas City Chiefs (2007), Buffalo Bills (2007)
- Todd Scott, defensive back, Minnesota Vikings (1991–1994), New York Jets (1995), Tampa Bay Buccaneers (1995–1996), Kansas City Chiefs (1997)
- Rafael Septién, place-kicker, New Orleans Saints (1977), Los Angeles Rams (1977), Dallas Cowboys (1978–1986), Denver Broncos (1989)
- Antwain Spann, cornerback for the New York Giants (2005), New England Patriots (2006–2008), Buffalo Bills (2009), Denver Broncos (2009)
- Brandon Stokley, wide receiver, Baltimore Ravens (1999–2002), Indianapolis Colts (2003–2006), Denver Broncos (2007–2009), Seattle Seahawks (2010); 2x Super Bowl Champion XXXV & XLI
- Ike Taylor, defensive back, Pittsburgh Steelers (2003–2014)
- Orlando Thomas (deceased), defensive back, Minnesota Vikings (1995–2001)
- Charles Tillman, cornerback, Chicago Bears (2003–2014), Carolina Panthers (2015)
- Clarence Verdin, wide receiver, Washington Redskins (1986–1987), Indianapolis Colts (1988–1993), Atlanta Falcons (1994)
- Melvin White, cornerback, Carolina Panthers (2013), St. Louis Rams (2015), Minnesota Vikings (2016)

==== Baseball ====
- Jose Alvarez, player for the Atlanta Braves (1977–1978)
- Spencer Arrighetti, pitcher for the Houston Astros (2024-)
- Gene Bacque, only non-Japanese player to receive the Eiji Sawamura Award; Hanshin (Japan), Tigers (1962–1968), Kintetsu Buffaloes (1969)
- Paul Bako, player for the Detroit Tigers, Houston Astros, Florida Marlins, Atlanta Braves, Milwaukee Brewers, Chicago Cubs, Los Angeles Dodgers, Kansas City Royals (1998–2009)
- Alvin Dark, former shortstop and manager in Major League Baseball
- Phil Devey, Canadian baseball pitcher
- Scott Dohmann, player for the Colorado Rockies (1999–2000)
- Ron Guidry, 1978 Cy Young Award winner; player for the New York Yankees (1975–1988)
- Gary Haught, player for the Oakland Athletics (1991–1997)
- Xavier Hernandez, player for the Toronto Blue Jays (1984–1989), Houston Astros (1990–1993, 1996), New York Yankees (1994), Cincinnati Reds (1995–1996), Texas Rangers (1997–1998)
- Chris Howard, player for the Seattle Mariners (1988–1991, 1993–1994)
- Jonathan Lucroy, player for the Milwaukee Brewers (2010–2016), Texas Rangers (2016–2017), Colorado Rockies (2017), Oakland A's (2018–present)
- B. J. Ryan, player for the Cincinnati Reds (1999), Baltimore Orioles (1999–2005), Toronto Blue Jays (2006–2009)
- Blake Trahan, former Cincinnati Reds shortstop; 2015 Sun Belt Conference Player of the Year
- Donne Wall, player for the Houston Astros (1995–1997), San Diego Padres (1998–2000), New York Mets (2001), Anaheim Angels (2002)

==== Basketball ====
- Frank Bartley (born 1994), player for Ironi Ness Ziona of the Israeli Basketball Premier League
- Kevin Brooks, former player for the Denver Nuggets (1991–94)
- JaKeenan Gant (born 1996), player for Hapoel Be'er Sheva of the Israeli Basketball Premier League
- Orien Greene, player for Boston Celtics (2005–2006), Indiana Pacers (2006–2007), Sacramento Kings (2007), and New Jersey Nets (2011)
- Bo Lamar, former Indiana Pacers (1975–76), Los Angeles Lakers (1976–77), and ABA player
- Shawn Long, player for Philadelphia 76ers (2017)
- Elfrid Payton, player for Orlando Magic (2014–18), Phoenix Suns (2018), New Orleans Pelicans (2018)
- Kim Perrot (deceased), former player with Houston Comets
- Fred Saunders, former Phoenix Suns (1974–1976), Boston Celtics (1976–78), and New Orleans Jazz (1978) player
- Johnathan Stove (born 1995), player for Hapoel Galil Elyon of the Israeli Basketball Premier League
- Andrew Toney, former player for Philadelphia 76ers (1980–88)
- Bryce Washington (born 1996), player in the Israeli National League
- Marv Winkler, former player for Milwaukee Bucks (1970–1971), Indiana Pacers (1971–1972)

==== Golf ====
- Mike Heinen, former professional golfer
- Craig Perks, former professional golfer, 2002 New Zealand Sportsman of the Year

==== Tennis ====
- Tony Minnis, UL Lafayette's all-time winningest singles player with a 94–40 college career; Louisiana Coach of the Year 1995 and 1999

==== Track and field ====
- Hollis Conway, high-jump athlete; Olympic medalist, 1988 silver, 1992 bronze
- John McDonnell, UL Lafayette track athlete (1966–1969); coached Arkansas to 42 NCAA championships

=== Other ===
- Dorien Llewellyn, three-time Water Ski World Championships gold medalist; won 2021 men's collegiate overall national title while competing for Louisiana Ragin' Cajuns water skiing
- Alan Jouban (attended), professional mixed martial artist, currently for the UFC's Welterweight Division
- H. Micheal Tarver, Latin American historian; commissioner on the Arkansas History Commission and the Arkansas Historical Records Advisory Board

== Faculty ==
- Barry Jean Ancelet (born 1951), ULL faculty since 1977; ULL alumni, graduated in 1974; folklorist of Cajun culture and expert on Cajun music and language
- Carl L. Bankston (born 1952), former professor; sociologist, author, immigration expert
- Carl W. Bauer (1933–2013), lawyer, politician and businessman; chief ULL lobbyist 1990–2010; member of both houses of the Louisiana State Legislature from St. Mary Parish 1966–1976
- Carl A. Brasseaux (born 1951), historian who helped pioneer the field of Cajun history; University of Louisiana at Lafayette professor and director of the Center for Louisiana Studies and the Center for Eco-Tourism, also an alumnus
- Richard Cusimano (1939–2024), historian, distinguished professor in the department of history
- Michael Doucet (born in 1951), Cajun fiddler; winner of National Heritage Fellowship; designed and taught the first college course on Cajun music
- Phebe Hayes, ULL faculty in speech pathology 1986–2013, also served as a dean; an independent historian of Iberia Parish
- Jeff Hennessy (1929–2015), associate professor of Physical Education 1959–1986; former trampoline coach to world champions
- Elemore Morgan, Jr. (1931–2008), associate professor 1965–1998; landscape painter
- Paul Prudhomme (1940–2015), chef famous for his Cajun cuisine; former adjunct
- Burton Raffel (1928–2015), former professor and chair in Humanities department 1989–2015 and professor emeritus of English starting in 2003; poet, noted for his translations of Beowulf and Cervantes' Don Quixote
- James Monroe Smith, president of Louisiana State University
- John Kennedy Toole (1937–1969), former professor in 1959; novelist, author of A Confederacy of Dunces

=== Artists in residency ===
- Ernest Gaines (1939–2019), writer-in-residence; nominated for the 2004 Nobel Prize in Literature and the 1993 Pulitzer Prize for fiction; author of The Autobiography of Miss Jane Pittman and A Lesson Before Dying
- Jesse Glass (born 1954), former resident poet

== See also ==
- List of University of Louisiana at Lafayette presidents
