= Louisiana's 45th House of Representatives district =

American legislative district

Louisiana's 45th State House of Representatives district
Representative
| Annie Spell; R–Lafayette |

Louisiana's 45th House of Representatives district is one of 105 Louisiana House of Representatives districts. It is currently represented by Republican Annie Spell of Lafayette. Spell was elected unopposed in a March 2025 special election after her predecessor, the regularly elected Brach Myers resigned to take up a seat in the senate for the 23rd district.

== Geography ==
HD44 includes a portion of the metropolitan area of Lafayette alongside its adjacent districts of 39, 43, and 44.

== Election results ==
| Year | Winning candidate | Party | Percent | Opponent | Party | Percent | Opponent | Party | Percent |
|---|---|---|---|---|---|---|---|---|---|
| 2011 | Joel Robideaux | Republican | 78.8% | W. David Chance | Libertarian | 21.2% | | | |
| 2015 | Jean-Paul Coussan | Republican | 51.2% | Andre Comeaux | Republican | 48.8% | | | |
| 2019 | Jean-Paul Coussan | Republican | 73% | Rhonda Kim Gleason | Democratic | 27% | | | |
| 2023 | Brach Myers | Republican | 70.1% | Paul LeBleu | Democratic | 25.5% | Jupiter LeBlanc | Independent | 4.4% |
| 2025 - Special | Annie Spell | Republican | Cancelled | | | | | | |
