= Louisiana's 46th House of Representatives district =

American legislative district

Louisiana's 46th State House of Representatives district
Representative
Chad Michael Boyer; R–Breaux Bridge

Louisiana's 46th House of Representatives district is one of 105 Louisiana House of Representatives districts. It is currently represented by Republican Chad Michael Boyer of Breaux Bridge.

== Geography ==
HD46 includes a small portion of the Lafayette metropolitan area, alongside its adjacent districts of 39, 40, 44, and 96. This district includes the towns of Arnanudville, Breaux Bridge, Henderson, Palmetto and Port Barre.

== Election results ==
Year	Winning candidate	Party	Percent	Opponent	Party	Percent
2011	Michael Huval	Republican	100%			
2015	Michael Huval	Republican	100%			
2019	Michael Huval	Republican	50.9%	Keith Baudin	Republican	49.1%
2023	Chad Michael Boyer	Republican	Cancelled			
