= Louisiana's 44th House of Representatives district =

American legislative district

Louisiana's 44th State House of Representatives district
Representative
| Tehmi Jahi Chassion; D–Lafayette |

Louisiana's 44th House of Representatives district is one of 105 Louisiana House of Representatives districts. It is currently represented by Democratic Tehmi Jahi Chassion of Lafayette.

== Geography ==
HD44 includes a portion of the metropolitan area of Lafayette alongside its adjacent districts of 39, 43, 45, 46, and 96.

== Election results ==
| Year | Winning candidate | Party | Percent | Opponent | Party | Percent | Opponent | Party | Percent |
|---|---|---|---|---|---|---|---|---|---|
| 2011 | Vincent Pierre | Democratic | 53.4% | Rickey Hardy | Democratic | 46.4% | | | |
| 2015 | Vincent Pierre | Democratic | 84.1% | Desmond Onezie | Independent | 15.9% | | | |
| 2019 | Vincent Pierre | Democratic | 84.1% | | | | | | |
| 2023 | Tehmi Jahi Chassion | Democratic | 51.6% | Patrick Lewis | Democratic | 39.1% | Ravis Martinez | Democratic | 9.3% |
