= List of mayors of Lafayette, Louisiana =

Mayor of Lafayette
- Flag of the City of Lafayette, LA
- Incumbent; Monique Blanco-Boulet since January 3, 2024
- Style: The Honorable
- Term length: Four years renewable three times
- Inaugural holder: Alphonse Neveu
- Formation: 1869
- Website: Mayor's Office website

The Office of the Mayor of Lafayette, known historically as Vermilionville, was established by an amendment passed on March 9, 1869, which replaced the "regular preliminaries of laying out" enacted by the Legislature upon the incorporation of Vermilionville on March 11, 1836. This amended city charter remained in place until 1914, when the citizens of Lafayette voted in favor of discarding the mayor-council government to be replaced by a city commission, the first of three members, the Commissioner of Public Safety, would serve as an ex-officio mayor.

== List ==
#	Mayor	Term start	Term end	Party
1	Alphonse Neveu	January 13, 1869	June 14, 1870	
2	William O. Smith	June 14, 1870	January 15, 1871	
3	William Brandt	January 15, 1871	November 22, 1872	Democratic
4	William O. Smith	November 22, 1872	January 23, 1873	
5	Auguste Monnier	January 23, 1873	November 26, 1875	Democratic
6	John O. Mouton	November 26, 1875	July 28, 1876	
7	G. C. Salles	July 28, 1876	May 12, 1877	
8	John O. Mouton	May 12, 1877	October 3, 1879	
9	John Clegg	October 3, 1879	January 8, 1881	Democratic
10	M. P. Young	January 8, 1881	November 5, 1884	
11	William B. Bailey	November 5, 1884	July 20, 1893	Democratic
12	William Campbell	July 20, 1893	January 12, 1895	Democratic
13	A. J. Moss	January 12, 1895	December 27, 1896	Democratic
14	Charles D. Caffery	December 27, 1896	December 28, 1899	Democratic
15	William Campbell	December 28, 1899	October 22, 1900	Democratic
16	Charles D. Caffery	October 22, 1900	January 17, 1905	Democratic
17	Charles O. Mouton	January 17, 1905	July 14, 1909	Democratic
18	George Armand Martin	July 14, 1909	October 13, 1911	Democratic
19	Anatole R. Trahan	October 13, 1911	January 10, 1913	Democratic
20	George Armand Martin	January 10, 1913	April 23, 1915	Democratic
21	Felix E. Girard Sr.	April 23, 1915	December 17, 1919	Democratic
22	Robert L. Mouton	December 17, 1919	October 11, 1927	Democratic
23	Joseph Gilbert St. Julien	October 11, 1927	October 16, 1931	Democratic
24	Robert L. Mouton	October 16, 1931	October 18, 1936	Democratic
25	J. Maxime Roy	October 18, 1936	October 4, 1944	Democratic
26	Claude C. Colomb	October 4, 1944	January 13, 1948	Democratic
27	Ashton J. Mouton	January 13, 1948	January 2, 1956	Democratic
28	Jerome E. Domengeaux	January 2, 1956	January 3, 1960	Democratic
29	J. Rayburn Bertrand	January 3, 1960	January 11, 1972	Democratic
30	Kenny Bowen	January 11, 1972	January 17, 1980	Democratic
31	Dud Lastrapes	January 17, 1980	January 16, 1992	Republican
32	Kenny Bowen	January 16, 1992	January 12, 1996	Democratic
33	Walter Comeaux	January 12, 1996	January 15, 2004	Democratic
34	Joey Durel	January 15, 2004	January 18, 2016	Republican
35	Joel Robideaux	January 18, 2016	January 6, 2020	Republican
36	Josh Guillory	January 6, 2020	January 3, 2024	Republican
37	Monique Blanco-Boulet	January 3, 2024	Incumbent	Republican

== See also ==
- Mayoral elections in Lafayette, Louisiana
