= Mayoral elections in Lafayette, Louisiana =

Elections for mayor in Lafayette, Louisiana

Elections are currently held every four years to elect the Mayor-President of Lafayette, Louisiana.

== 2011 ==
2011 Lafayette mayoral election
- October 22, 2011
- Turnout: 33.99%
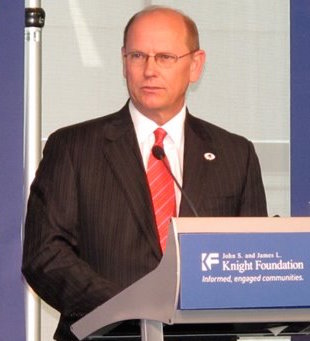
Candidate	Joey Durel	Mike Stagg
Party	Republican	Democrat
Popular vote	28,794	16,663
Percentage	63.34%	36.66%
Mayor-President before election
Joey Durel
Republican
Elected Mayor-President
Joey Durel
Republican

The 2011 Lafayette mayoral election was held on October 22, 2011. It saw the reelection of the incumbent Mayor-President Joey Durel.

Election results
Candidate	Votes	%
Joey Durel	28,794	63.34
Mike Stagg	16,663	36.66
Total votes	45,457	100

== 2015 ==
2015 Lafayette mayoral election
- October 24, 2015
- Turnout: 40.43%
Candidate	Joel Robideaux	Dee Stanley
Party	Republican	Republican
Popular vote	31,624	25,156
Percentage	55.70%	44.30%
Mayor-President before election
Joey Durel
Republican
Elected Mayor-President
Joel Robideaux
Republican

The 2015 Lafayette mayoral election was held on October 24, 2015. It saw the election of Joel Robideaux, a former member of the Louisiana House of Representatives.

Joey Durel, the incumbent mayor-president, did not seek reelection. Two Republican candidates participated in the election.

Election results
Candidate	Votes	%
Joel Robideaux	31,624	55.70
Dee Stanley	25,156	44.30
Total votes	56,780	100

== 2019 ==
2019 Lafayette mayoral election
- November 16, 2019
- Turnout: 44.33% (Primary); 51.16% (General)
Candidate	Josh Guillory	Carlee Alm-LaBar
Party	Republican	Independent
Popular vote	43,103	34,047
Percentage	55.87%	44.13%
Mayor-President before election
Joel Robideaux
Republican
Elected Mayor-President
Josh Guillory
Republican

The 2019 Lafayette mayoral election was held on November 16, 2019. It saw the election of Josh Guillory, a Republican attorney.

Joel Robideaux, the incumbent mayor-president, did not seek reelection. A total of 5 candidates participated in the election. A primary election was held on October 12 to decide the two candidates on the general election.

Primary election results
Candidate	Votes	%
Josh Guillory	20,140	30.52
Carlee Alm-LaBar	18,799	28.49
Simone Champagne	16,102	24.40
Carlos Harvin	6,717	10.18
Nancy Marcotte	4,234	6.42
Total votes	65,992	100

General election results
Candidate	Votes	%
Josh Guillory	43,103	55.87
Carlee Alm-LaBar	34,047	44.13
Total votes	77,150	100

== 2023 ==
2023 Lafayette mayoral election
- November 18, 2023
- Turnout: 37.16% (Primary); 31.99% (General)
Candidate	Monique Blanco Boulet	Josh Guillory
Party	Republican	Republican
Popular vote	25,134	22,867
Percentage	52.36%	47.64%
Mayor-President before election
Josh Guillory
Republican
Elected Mayor-President
Monique Blanco Boulet
Republican

The 2023 Lafayette mayoral election was held on November 18, 2023. It saw the election of Republican Monique Blanco Boulet, defeating incumbent Josh Guillory. Boulet, who is the daughter of former Louisiana governor Kathleen Blanco, became the first woman to hold this position.

A total of 3 candidates participated in the election. A primary election was held on October 14, where Guillory and Boulet advanced to a runoff election, eliminating Republican candidate Jan Swift.

Primary election results
Candidate	Votes	%
Josh Guillory	22,731	39.87%
Monique Blanco Boulet	19,507	34.21%
Jan Swift	14,777	25.92%
Total votes	57,015	100%

General election results
Candidate	Votes	%
Monique Blanco Boulet	25,134	52.36%
Josh Guillory	22,867	47.64%
Total votes	48,001	100%
