= Troy Hebert =

American politician

Member of the Louisiana House of Representatives

Member of the Louisiana State Senate from the 22nd district
- In office January 14, 2008 – November 24, 2010
- Preceded by: Craig Romero
- Succeeded by: Fred Henry Mills, Jr.
- Constituency: Iberia Parish

Member of the Louisiana House of Representatives from the 49th district
- In office January 8, 1996 – January 14, 2008
- Preceded by: Ted Haik
- Succeeded by: Simone B. Champagne

Personal details
- Born: Troy Michael Hebert; April 19, 1966 (age 60) Louisiana
- Party: Democratic (until 2010); Independent
- Education: University of Louisiana at Lafayette
- Occupation: Businessman

Troy Michael Hebert (born April 19, 1966) is a politician from Jeanerette, Louisiana, who is the former commissioner of the Louisiana Office of Alcohol and Tobacco Control (ATC). Hebert was appointed commissioner by Republican Governor Bobby Jindal and served in the role until December 2015. A jury awarded an ATC agent he fired nearly $400,000. The FBI investigated him in 2016 for extorting sex from a woman. He has served in the Louisiana House of Representatives and Louisiana State Senate. He has been divorced three times and has lived in North Carolina since 2018.

Louisiana State Senate
Preceded by Craig Romero	Louisiana State Senator for District 22 (Iberia, Lafayette, St. Martin, and Vermilion parishes); Troy Michael Hebert; 2008–2010	Succeeded by Fred Henry Mills, Jr.
Louisiana House of Representatives
Preceded by Ted Haik	Louisiana State Representative from District 49 (Iberia and Vermilion parishes); Troy Michael Hebert; 1996–2008	Succeeded by Simone B. Champagne
