= Senator Romero =

Senator Romero may refer to:

- Craig Romero (born 1954), Louisiana State Senate
- Gloria Romero (politician) (born 1955), California State Senate
- Richard M. Romero (born 1944), New Mexico State Senate
- Ross I. Romero (born 1971), Utah State Senate

== See also ==
- Senator Romer (disambiguation)
