= Doyle Boudreaux =

American politician

Member of the Louisiana House of Representatives from the 39th district
- Incumbent
- Assumed office March 9, 2026
- Preceded by: Julie Emerson

Personal details
- Party: Republican
- Education: The Wharton School
- Profession: Business Owner, Retired Firefighter

Doyle Boudreaux is a politician from Lafayette Parish, Louisiana and is the elected member of the Louisiana House of Representatives for District 39. Boudreaux was previously on the city council in the city of Scott. Boudreaux won a special election to succeed Julie Emerson, who became the chief of staff to Governor Jeff Landry.
