= University of Southwestern Louisiana basketball scandal =

College basketball rule violation

In 1973, the University of Southwestern Louisiana (now known as the University of Louisiana at Lafayette) was penalized by the National Collegiate Athletic Association (NCAA) for rules violations concerning the university's basketball program. This followed an investigation in which the association discovered that the program had been fielding academically ineligible players and paying student athletes, in violation of the NCAA's rules. As a result, the NCAA applied what is now referred to as the "death penalty" to the program, barring them from competing for two years, in addition to other forms of punishment that included a probation period and a removal of voting rights in the association.

In the late 1960s, Beryl Shipley, who had been the head coach of Southwestern Louisiana's basketball program since 1957, began to recruit African American players into what had formerly been a racially segregated athletics program. With several African American star players on the team, the basketball program saw a period of marked success in the 1960s and early 1970s that included several appearances in the NCAA men's basketball tournament. However, issues regarding athletic scholarships for these student athletes ultimately resulted in the NCAA placing the university on probation. Several years later, in 1971, the NCAA received a tip that there had been further rules violations at the university, resulting in a formal investigation. In total, the NCAA leveled accusations of about 125 instances of rules violations against the university. Specific charges included the payment of several players, including by Shipley himself, in direct violation of the NCAA's policy of amateurism. Additionally, the association found that the team had played several academically ineligible players. In one instance, the NCAA found that an assistant coach had doctored a player's transcript and forged a signature in order to demonstrate his eligibility.

As a result, the NCAA barred the basketball program from fielding a team for two years and barred the entire Ragin' Cajuns athletic program from postseason play and live television for four years. Additionally, Southwestern Louisiana was placed on indefinite probation and stripped of its NCAA voting rights for four years. The punishments have been considered among the most severe in the NCAA's history, and as of 2011, it remains one of only five times that the death penalty has been applied to a member institution. Shipley, who retired shortly before the punishments were applied, maintained his innocence in the scandal until his death in 2011. Following the two-year death penalty period, the university resumed its basketball program under the direction of new head coach Jim Hatfield.

== Background ==
=== Recruitment of African American athletes at Southwestern Louisiana ===
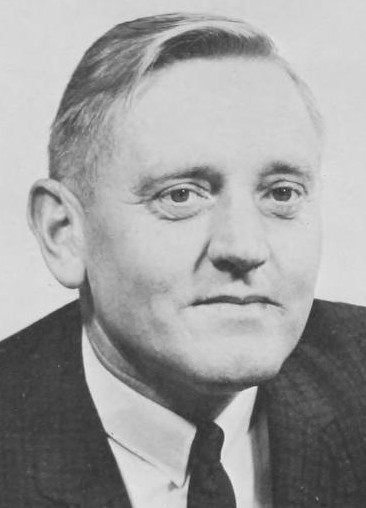
Beryl Shipley, c. 1968

In 1957, Beryl Shipley was hired as the head coach for the college basketball program at Southwestern Louisiana Institute, a public university in Lafayette, Louisiana, part of the Acadiana region of the state. While the university had been one of the first in the Deep South to desegregate, doing so in 1954, the university's athletics programs still followed an unwritten rule enforced by their athletic conference, the Gulf States Conference, that barred both the recruiting of African American players and participating in nonconference games against teams that fielded black players. However, in 1966, Shipley went against this rule and began recruiting African American players for the university, which had by this time renamed itself to the University of Southwestern Louisiana. Concerning the significance of this, a 2011 article in Sports Illustrated said that, "Shipley ... in 1966 became the first coach to integrate a major sports team at a large public university in the Deep South." Shipley has stated that his recruitment of black players did not stem from a desire to be a civil rights activist, but was instead driven by the fact that, because many other large universities in the region would not recruit African American players, his only competition in recruiting came from institutions outside of the area and from local historically black colleges and universities.

=== Scholarship issues in the late 1960s ===
In 1966, Elvin Ivory, Leslie Scott, and Marv Winkler enrolled at Southwestern Louisiana as the first three black basketball players recruited by Shipley. However, before the 1966–67 season began, Stan Galloway, the athletic commissioner of the Louisiana State Board of Education, requested to both Shipley and Southwestern Louisiana President Clyde Rougeou that they cut the three players from the team. Shipley resisted, after which Galloway informed him that state funding would not be available for the players' athletic scholarships, as the Louisiana State Legislature did not allow funding for African American student athletes. To get around this, Shipley solicited donations from individuals and organizations in Lafayette's black community to fund the three's scholarships. However, this prompted an investigation from the National Collegiate Athletic Association (NCAA), which prohibited boosters from directly financing a student athlete's scholarship. According to Shipley, the issue was due to the fact that the boosters had directly given the students the scholarships instead of the university's scholarship committee. Due to the rules violation, the NCAA placed the university on probation, which barred the team from having their games televised and competing in postseason play. The investigation and probation caused the program to be placed under heightened scrutiny and created a public perception that Shipley was engaging in financial misconduct with his players. For instance, during a game against Louisiana Tech, supporters of the opposing team pelted Southwestern Louisiana players with coins, and during a game against Houston, the Spirit of Houston played a rendition of "Big Spender".

=== Success under Shipley ===
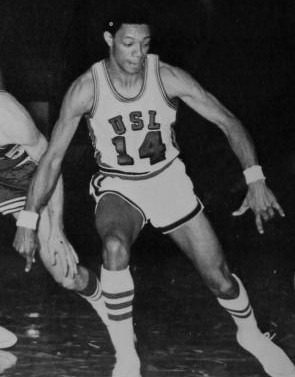
Marv Winkler was one of the first African Americans to play basketball for the University of Southwestern Louisiana.

Under Shipley, the program had many sellout games at their home venue, the Blackham Coliseum. After upgrading to Division I in 1972, they made it to the Sweet Sixteen round of the NCAA men's basketball tournament in their first two seasons in the NCAA's top division. Additionally, in 1972, Southwestern Louisiana player Bo Lamar led the nation in scoring. According to Shipley, the program's newfound success led to some "resentment" from more established institutions in the NCAA, telling The New York Times in 1973,

[W]e've become successful in basketball and now we're facing other resentment. It's faced by any school—Jacksonville, Las Vegas, Southwest Louisiana—that's a Johnny‐come‐lately and not in an old, established conference. I think the other schools feel they've been in on the TV money for years and they resent us now. They say everybody loves a winner, but in our profession, everybody loves a loser.

Additionally, players on his team have stated that the resentment they experienced from other programs was partially due to the fact that Southwestern Louisiana was one of the first and only universities in the region to field an integrated team, with Ivory saying in 2011, "You have to understand, when you're winning with black ballplayers, and you're the first one to win with black ballplayers, not everybody is going to take kindly to you." Per Ivory, when Shipley and his teams began to challenge more established programs, such as the LSU Tigers, "it wasn't just about basketball anymore."

== 1970s scandal ==
In the spring of 1971, the NCAA received a tip that there had been rules violations at Southwestern Louisiana concerning the recruiting of several basketball players. According to Shipley, the tip had been given by a graduate assistant that did scouting and recruiting work for the basketball program who had been fired in early 1971. In November 1972, the NCAA notified the university that they had conducted an initial investigation into the allegations and "found them to be of sufficient substance and reliability to warrant an official inquiry". That same month, the university placed Shipley, his assistant coach Tom Cox, and the university's athletic director A. G. Urban on a two-year probation.

In early 1973, The New York Times reported that the NCAA was expected to formally charge the university with over 120 instances of rules violations, largely consisting of violations of the NCAA's recruiting policies, at the association's annual convention in Chicago on January 9. However, on January 6, Federal District Judge Richard Johnson Putnam for the United States District Court for the Western District of Louisiana ordered a temporary injunction against the NCAA, postponing the association's planned hearing for January 9. Louisiana Attorney General William J. Guste had requested the injunction on the grounds that the NCAA had not given the university enough time to prepare a legal defense. A hearing on the matter was scheduled for January 15, during which time the judge would decide whether or not to issue a permanent injunction against the NCAA. The litigation allowed Southwestern Louisiana to participate in the 1973 NCAA University Division basketball tournament, despite the NCAA's protestations.

=== Accusations ===
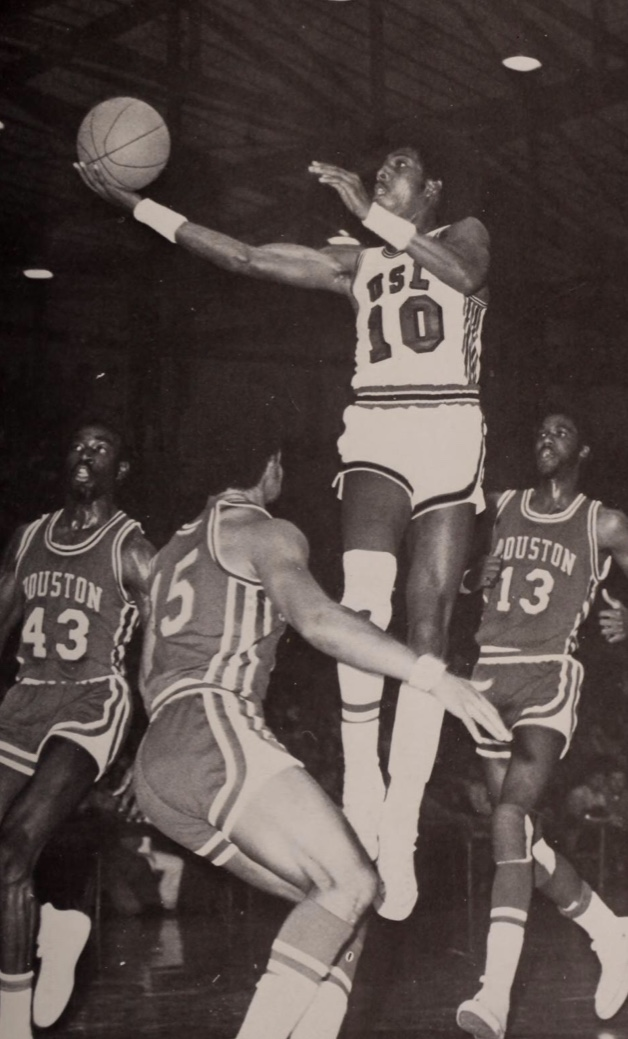
Bo Lamar was one of several players accused of accepting payment for playing.

On February 9, the specific accusations that the NCAA had made against the university were made public in a court briefing filed by the association. In total, there were about 125 instances of suspected rules violations that the NCAA was charging Southwestern Louisiana with. While it was common practice for the NCAA to publish only the violations and not the names of the players involved, the court proceedings made direct references to the individual players, whose names were first reported on by The American Press newspaper of Lake Charles, Louisiana.

Among other charges, the association alleged that the university and boosters had made improper payments to student athletes and recruits, typically in the range of between $10 and $30 (between $73 and $218 in 2025). According to the NCAA, after one game in the 1970–71 season, Lamar had received a $100 payment (equivalent to $795 in 2025) from a booster, while fellow player Roy Ebron was given a monthly payment of $450 ($3,577 in 2025) for his participation on the team. Fred Saunders was also accused of accepting payments, as well as free airline tickets from the university. Shipley in particular was accused of allowing student athletes to freely use his car and assisting them financially in the form of paying for gasoline and giving them personal loans with possibly no repayment required. Per the investigation, it was alleged that coaches had a plan in place with a nearby gas station to allow players to use a university credit card there. In another specific charge, Shipley was accused of paying for clothes for a player from a Lafayette store.

The association also accused the university of fielding several players who were academically ineligible. In total, five players had grade point averages that should have prevented them from participating in games. In a specific charge against Cox, the NCAA accused him of changing several letter grades on one student's high school transcript from Fs to As and forging the high school principal's signature. Additional accusations included having a stand-in take the ACT for incoming freshmen. Additionally, the NCAA accused the university of giving high school basketball player Greg Procell $150 ($1,192 in 2025) in exchange for him committing to play at Southwestern Louisiana. Procell, who had been a standout high school player in Louisiana in the tiny community of Ebarb, was also guaranteed monthly payments, a summer job, and the use of a car. Shipley was also accused of giving prospective recruits cash payments during tours of the Southwestern Louisiana campus.

=== Response by Shipley ===
Shipley called the charges "political" and "picayune", saying that, while there had been some negligence on the university's part in following proper recruiting guidelines, the scandal was mostly the result of the "bitter" former graduate assistant. In later interviews, Shipley admitted to some violations for "humanitarian reasons", such as paying for clothing for a freshman player who came from a poor background and lacked "a change of clothes or sheets for his bed" when he enrolled at Southwestern Louisiana. In May, before any formal punishments for the charges had been leveled by the NCAA, Shipley resigned from Southwestern Louisiana. Per Sports Illustrated, the reason he gave for his resignation had been a dispute regarding pay that he had with the university. He had been the head coach at Southwestern Louisiana for 16 years, amassing an overall win–loss record of 296–129 and only one losing season.

=== Punishment ===
On August 5, a council of the NCAA announced that they would be leveling the following punishments against the institution:

- A two-year ban on its basketball team playing in the NCAA, effectively canceling the 1973–74 and 1974–75 seasons.
- A four-year ban on participation in NCAA championships.
- A four-year ban on televising their sporting events.
- A four-year ban on voting rights in NCAA matters.
- An indefinite period of probation.

Additionally, the council recommended that member institutions vote to expel Southwestern Louisiana from the association during their next general meeting in January 1974. However, this ultimately did not happen.

== Aftermath ==
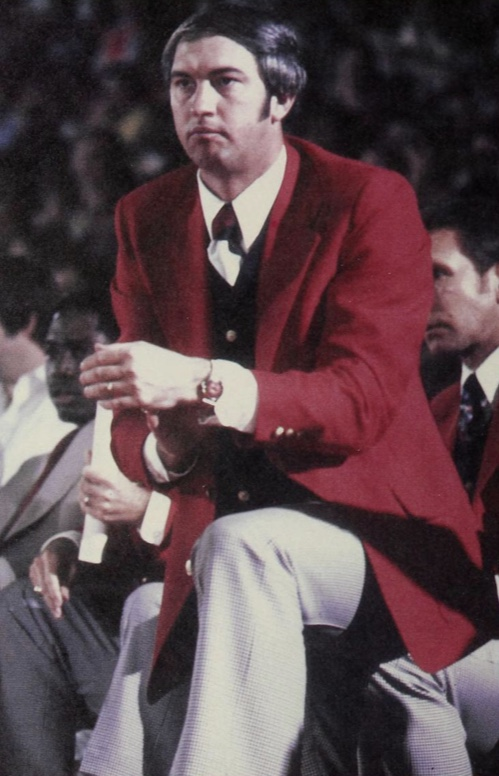
Jim Hatfield (pictured c. 1978) served as the head coach of the Southwestern Louisiana basketball program in the late 1970s.

Following the announcements, players on the Southwestern Louisiana team began to transfer to other institutions. Saunders initially transferred to Syracuse University, but the NCAA found him ineligible to play in the 1973–74 season because of his violations at Southwestern Louisiana. However, in January, the NCAA voted to regrant him eligibility. Other players transferred to Canisius College, the University of Hawaii, Iowa State University, Mercer University, and the University of Oklahoma. Following the two-year ban, the basketball program at Southwestern Louisiana was revived, with Jim Hatfield serving as the new head coach. In 1999, the university was renamed to the University of Louisiana at Lafayette, known simply as Louisiana for athletics purposes. In 2007, the NCAA again investigated the university's basketball program for academics violations, prompting comparisons to the 1970s scandal. However, due in part to the university's cooperation, the NCAA's punishments against the university were much less severe than in the 1970s, amounting to the vacating of several wins and a probation period.

The two-year ban on playing that the NCAA leveled against Southwestern Louisiana was only the second time that the association had instituted such a penalty, commonly known as the "death penalty". As of 2011, it is also one of only five times in its history that the NCAA had applied the death penalty to the sports program of a member institution. Multiple sources, including the Chicago Tribune and The New York Times, have called the punishments against the university the harshest in the NCAA's history, while a 2010 article from Bleacher Report listed the scandal as among the 25 worst in the history of college athletics.

== Sources ==
- Denlinger, Kenneth; Shapiro, Leonard (1975). Athletes for Sale. A Washington Post Book. New York City: Thomas Y. Crowell Co. ISBN 978-0-690-00602-5. OCLC 1130143.
- Durso, Joseph (1975). The Sports Factory: An Investigation into College Sports. The New York Times Sports Department. New York City: Quadrangle Books. ISBN 978-0-8129-0533-5. OCLC 1229529.
- Mashburn, Luke (2023). "Case 12: Southwestern Louisiana Basketball Grade Fraud". In Sanderson, Jimmy (ed.). Corruption and Scandal in American Sports: Causes and Consequences. New York City: Bloomsbury Academic. pp. 83–86. ISBN 978-1-4408-7838-1. OCLC 1393303535.
