= Tehmi Jahi Chassion =

American politician

Member of the Louisiana House of Representatives from the 44 district
- Incumbent
- Assumed office January 8, 2024
- Preceded by: Vincent Pierre

Personal details
- Party: Democratic
- Education: Louisiana State University (B.S.); Xavier University of Louisiana (PharmD)
- Occupation: Pharmacist, roofing and construction, real estate agent

Tehmi Jahi Chassion is an American politician serving as a member of the Louisiana House of Representatives for the 44th district. A member of the Democratic Party, Chassion assumed office on January 8, 2024.

== Personal life ==
Chassion is a pharmacist in Breaux Bridge.

== Political career ==
Chassion's political career started in Lafayette as a three-term member of the Lafayette Parish School Board, when he then ran for the Louisiana House of Representatives for District 44 and won the election outright in the primary on October 14, 2023, and assumed office on January 8, 2024.

== See also ==
- Louisiana House of Representatives
