= Jim Hatfield =

American basketball player and coach (1943–2025)

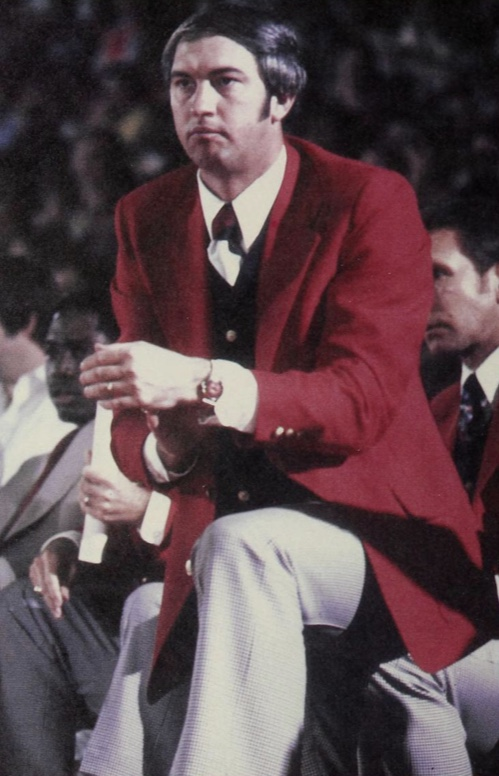
- Hatfield during the 1977–78 season

Biographical details
- Born: December 28, 1943; Maryville, Tennessee, U.S.
- Died: February 26, 2025 (aged 81); Lexington, Kentucky, U.S.

Playing career
- 1963–1966: East Tennessee State

Coaching career (HC unless noted)
- 1972–1974: Kentucky (assistant)
- 1975–1978: Southwestern Louisiana
- 1978–1981: Mississippi State
- 1981–1983: Hardin–Simmons
- 1983–1985: Kentucky (assistant)

Head coaching record
- Overall: 96–122 (.440)

Accomplishments and honors

Championships
- Southland regular season (1977)

James Malcolm Hatfield (December 28, 1943 – February 26, 2025) was an American college basketball coach. He was head coach of the Southwestern Louisiana Ragin' Cajuns, Mississippi State Bulldogs, and the Hardin–Simmons Cowboys.

== Biography ==
Hatfield played at East Tennessee State. Following the close of his college career, he joined the coaching ranks. An assistant at Kentucky from 1972 to 1974, he was hired as head coach of the University of Southern Louisiana (now the University of Louisiana at Lafayette) in 1975 following a college basketball scandal there. He compiled a record of 47–35 in three seasons and was then hired to coach Mississippi State of the Southeastern Conference (SEC). Hatfield coached three seasons for the Bulldogs, ultimately resigning at the end of the 1980–81 season.

He then coached at Hardin–Simmons for two seasons before returning to Kentucky as an assistant.

Hatfield died on February 26, 2025, at the age of 81.

== Head coaching record ==
Record table
Season	Team	Overall	Conference	Standing	Postseason
Southwestern Louisiana Ragin' Cajuns (Southland Conference) (1975–1978)
1975–76	Southwestern Louisiana	7–19	4–6	4th	
1976–77	Southwestern Louisiana	21–8	8–2	1st	
1977–78	Southwestern Louisiana	19–8	7–3	3rd	
Southwestern Louisiana:		47–35 (.573)	19–11 (.633)		
Mississippi State Bulldogs (Southeastern Conference) (1978–1981)
1978–79	Mississippi State	19–9	11–7	T–3rd	
1979–80	Mississippi State	13–14	7–11	T–6th	
1980–81	Mississippi State	8–19	3–15	10th	
Mississippi State:		40–42 (.488)	21–33 (.389)		
Hardin-Simmons Cowboys (Trans America Athletic Conference) (1981–1983)
1981–82	Hardin-Simmons	6–20	2–14	9th	
1982–83	Hardin-Simmons	3–25	1–13	8th	
Hardin-Simmons:		9–45 (.167)	3–27 (.100)		
Total:		96–122 (.440)			
