= Firmin Breaux =

Pierre Firmin Breaux
- Born: September 22, 1749; Rivière-aux-Canards, Grand Pré, Acadia
- Died: October 1, 1808 (aged 59); Breaux Bridge, Louisiana
- Spouse: Marguerite Braud

Pierre Firmin Breaux (September 22, 1749 – October 1, 1808) was a Cajun pioneer and American patriot known for unofficially founding the city of Breaux Bridge, Louisiana.

== Life ==
Firmin was the son of Alexis Breaux and Marguerite Barrieu, born at Riviere aux Canards, near present day Port Williams, Nova Scotia, in 1749. In 1755, Firmin's family, along with many other Acadians, were deported from Nova Scotia into Boston during the expulsion of the Acadians. In 1767, at the age of 17, Firmin found himself at the Bayou Tortue in Louisiana, while the rest of his family returned to Canada. By 1769, Firmin had moved into a house in present day St. James Parish, and had been married to his wife Marguerite Braud.

Firmin was a Patriot during the American Revolutionary War and served in the Attakapas Spanish Militia under Bernardo de Gálvez. The Militia fought at Fort Bute and Baton Rouge.

He died October 1, 1808, in Breaux Bridge.

== Breaux Bridge ==
In 1771, Firmin bought land near the Bayou Teche from the wealthy New Orleans merchant, Jean François Ledée, who had acquired the land as a French land grant. By 1774, Breaux's branding iron had been registered, and by 1786 he was one of the largest property owners near the Bayou Teche.

In 1799, Breaux built a footbridge across the Bayou Teche, in order to ease the passage of his family and neighbors across the Teche.
