= Jean-Paul Coussan =

American politician (born 1978)

Member of the Louisiana Public Service Commission from the 2nd district
- Incumbent
- Assumed office January 1, 2025
- Preceded by: Craig Greene

Member of the Louisiana Senate from the 23rd district
- In office January 8, 2024 – January 1, 2025
- Preceded by: Page Cortez
- Succeeded by: Brach Myers

Member of the Louisiana House of Representatives from the 45th district
- In office January 11, 2016 – January 8, 2024
- Preceded by: Joel Robideaux
- Succeeded by: Brach Myers

Personal details
- Born: Jean-Paul Philip Coussan; August 31, 1978 (age 47) Lafayette, Louisiana, U.S.
- Party: Republican
- Education: Louisiana State University (BA, JD)

Jean-Paul Philip Coussan, known as JP Coussan (born August 31, 1978), is an American lawyer, small business owner and Republican politician from Lafayette, Louisiana, who represented District 23 in the Louisiana Senate from 2024 to 2025. He previously represented District 45 in the Louisiana House of Representatives from 2016 to 2024.

== Background ==
Coussan's paternal grandfather, G. Louis Coussan, was a professor at the University of Louisiana at Lafayette and the dean of the college of education there. His grandmother, Mary B. Coussan, taught for the Lafayette Parish School Board. His father, Dr. George Coussan, a radiologist, quarterbacked the ULL Ragin' Cajuns, when the team played in the Grantland Rice Bowl in Baton Rouge in 1970. His mother, the former Jo Ellen Becnel, is a real estate broker for Van Eaton & Romero in Lafayette. Coussan and his wife, Jennifer Joy, have three children, and attend Our Lady of Fatima Catholic Church in Lafayette.

Coussan graduated from the Catholic-affiliated St. Thomas More High School in Lafayette and then Louisiana State University and the Louisiana State University Law Center, both in Baton Rouge.

== Career ==
A partner at the Lafayette real estate law firm, Andrus Boudreaux Complete Title, Coussan also co-founded Cougar Constructione. He was formerly affiliated with Ottinger Hebert, LLC, at which his clients came mainly from oil and natural gas. He previously served on the commission overseeing the Lafayette Cajundome. His other affiliations include the Chamber of Commerce, the Acadian Homebuilders Association, the Chamber of Commerce, the Leukemia & Lymphoma Society, and the Boy Scouts of America.

Coussan won his seat in a runoff election held on November 21, 2015, over fellow Republican Andre' Comeaux. The two had emerged as the top two candidates from the October 24 primary election in which a third contender, Republican Jan Swift, was eliminated from further consideration.

In his freshman term, Coussan has proved to be a competent negotiator in the Legislature, often working behind the scenes to affect change. He was part of the "Gang of Eight" as described by political columnist Jeremy Alford, who led the charge in 2016 to elect Taylor Barras as the first independent Speaker of the Louisiana House of Representatives, bucking the tradition of supporting the governor's chosen leader. Later that same year, Coussan was among the "Gang of No" who voted repeatedly against proposed tax increases and other tax measures pushed by then newly installed Democratic Governor John Bel Edwards, working instead on compromise legislation to put a temporary sales tax increase in place set to expire in 2018, providing time to craft long-term fiscal reform to the state budget.

As a result of these and other votes during a series of special legislative sessions in his first year in office, Coussan was ranked the 12th most conservative member of the legislature by the American Conservative Union in 2016, which ranked legislators who vote "most consistently with the ideals articulated in the U.S. Constitution: limited transparent government, individual rights, personal responsibility, and lasting cultural values."

He was named a "Business Champion" at the Chamber SWLA's annual LegisGator Awards in 2016 and 2017. The Louisiana Association of Business and Industry gave him honorable mentions in 2016 and 2017 on its annual legislative scorecard, along with legislators who worked to advance "a platform of positive, pro-growth measures to improve Louisiana's economic climate." Also in both of his two years serving in the House, Coussan maintained a 100% voting record with the NFIB who named him a Guardian of Small Business. He was also named a Family Advocate by the Louisiana Family Forum.
