= Raymond Lalonde =

American politician (1940–2022)

Raymond "LaLa" Lalonde
- Raymond "LaLa" Lalonde

Louisiana State Representative, District 39
- In office 1980–1996
- Preceded by: Walter Champagne
- Succeeded by: Clara Baudoin

Personal details
- Born: October 22, 1940 Arnaudville, Louisiana, U.S.
- Died: December 30, 2022 (aged 82) Carencro, Louisiana, U.S.
- Party: Republican
- Spouse: Evelyn Cathey Lalonde
- Education: University of Texas at Arlington; Louisiana State University

Raymond Lalonde (October 22, 1940 – December 30, 2022) was an American politician who was a Republican member of the Louisiana House of Representatives from Carencro in Lafayette Parish. He resided in the town of Sunset in St. Landry Parish. He served in the Louisiana House from 1980 to 1996.

== Early years and education ==
Lalonde was born and reared on a farm in a rural area near Arnaudville. Following his graduation from Leonville High School, Lalonde served four years in the United States Air Force as a technician on the B-52s and KC-135s. Lalonde received a bachelor of science degree from the University of Texas at Arlington with a degree in mathematics, minor in physics, and a second equivalent degree in foreign language. He also held a master of science in industrial technology from Louisiana State University in Baton Rouge.

Lalonde worked for Boeing Airplane Company and Texas Instruments for a total of eight years. He then returned to Louisiana in 1971 and spent three years teaching mathematics, physics and chemistry at Sunset High School in Sunset, Louisiana, before he transferred to T. H. Harris Technical College, where he taught Industrial Electronics and then advanced to Director in 1991, having served in that role until his retirement in 2003. T. H. Harris was a Louisiana superintendent of education prior to 1940.

== Political actions and positions ==
Lalonde was first elected to House District 39 in 1979, when he unseated fellow Democrat Walter Champagne by eighty-one votes. He was elected to four terms but was defeated in 1995 by Clara Baudoin.

=== Gambling ===
Lalonde was a strong supporter of the legalization of gambling in Louisiana working along with Governor Edwin Washington Edwards. In 1990, he sponsored the measure that created a lottery on voter approval. In 1991, he cosponsored the bill that legalized fifteen riverboat casinos throughout Louisiana. Lalonde also chaired the criminal justice committee, which regulates gambling issues.

The following year, Lalonde sponsored the New Orleans land-based casino bill. Lalonde supported gambling as a method of economic development in Louisiana. He stated, speaking of a land-based casino in New Orleans, "This is one important step to help New Orleans be self-supporting and pull themselves up by the bootstraps. I don't know how you feel about taxes, but I can vote for this rather than taxes."

Lalonde also said gambling and other forms of entertainment were going to become a major economic force in the United States as the baby boomer generation approaches retirement age. "Anytime you see a population getting older, you see more money available for entertainment – when you're twenty-five years old and struggling, you generally don't have a lot of money and you have kids to raise and money to put away for college and that kind of stuff."

In 1993, Lalonde received more than 60 percent of his 1993 campaign contributions from gambling interests – $21,350 out of $34,150 he raised the previous year to prepare for his 1995 re-election bid. Two months before election day, in August 1995, the FBI released affidavits regarding a federal probe involving the gambling industry in Louisiana. These affidavits stated one truck stop owner was heard telling another that Lalonde wanted to avoid criticism for accepting campaign contributions from truck stop owners in support of video poker machines by disguising their campaign contributions in small amounts of $250 or $500 and in the names of their children or cousins. Lalonde's financial records were subpoenaed and he was acquitted of all charges.

=== Cockfighting ===
Lalonde was a strong supporter of Louisiana cockfighting. At a banquet in 1980, the newly elected Lalonde remarked to the assembled guests, "This is my wife, Evelyn. No, y'all don't fool with my cock-fightin' and I won't fool with your business." In response to assertions by opponents that cockfighting is a cruel activity, Lalonde said, "Boxing is more inhumane than cockfighting. Birds used in fights are naturally aggressive. Even the use of razors on the birds' legs for the fights is humane. It shortens the fights, which can otherwise take hours and become boring for spectators."

=== Minority set-asides ===
In 1988, Lalonde introduced his bill to allow Cajuns to qualify for minority set-aside contracts awarded by the state. Lalonde proposed the bill to enhance the status of the French Acadian people. The bill passed the state house by a vote of 74 to 22.

=== Later political career ===
Lalonde announced in January 2007 that he would seek to return to his former Louisiana House seat. Louisiana voters instituted term limits in 1996, limiting lawmakers to three consecutive four-year terms in one chamber. Lalonde voted against the measure in 1995. Since Lalonde was voted out of office in 1995, the term limit law does not apply to him.

In his 2007 race, he was opposed by businessman Tommy Angelle, Carencro City Council member Bobby Badon, and home builder Stephen Ortego. Lalonde stated on his chances, "It looks like I've been in purgatory long enough and paid for my sins."

In 2012, Lalonde lost a race for the District 39 seat on the Louisiana Republican State Central Committee. With just under 39 percent of the ballots, he was defeated by Julie Emerson.

== Death ==
Lalonde died on December 30, 2022, at the age of 82.

Preceded by Walter Champagne	Louisiana State Representative from District 39; 1980–1996	Succeeded by Clara G. Baudoin
