= Senator Romer =

Senator Romer may refer to:

- Chris Romer (born 1959), Colorado State Senate
- Roy Romer (born 1928), Colorado State Senate

== See also ==
- Senator Romero (disambiguation)
