= Fred Mills (politician) =

American politician

Member of the Louisiana Senate from the 22nd district
- In office January 24, 2011 – January 8, 2024
- Preceded by: Troy Hebert
- Succeeded by: Blake Miguez

Member of the Louisiana House of Representatives from the 46th district
- In office January 14, 2008 – January 24, 2011
- Preceded by: Sydnie Maraist Durand
- Succeeded by: Pete Huval

Personal details
- Born: Fred Henry Mills Jr. January 13, 1955 (age 71)
- Party: Democratic (before 2010); Republican (2010–present)
- Spouse: Deborah Mills
- Education: University of Louisiana, Monroe (BS)

Fred Henry Mills, Jr. (born January 13, 1955), is an American pharmacist, banker, and politician from Parks, Louisiana who served as a Republican member of the Louisiana State Senate, having won a special election on January 22, 2011. Mills had previously represented District 46 in the Louisiana House of Representatives.

== Early life and education ==
Mills holds a degree in pharmacy from the University of Louisiana at Monroe. He is the owner in St. Martin Parish of Mills Cashway Pharmacy in Parks and the president and chief executive officer of Farmers-Merchants Bank and Trust Co. of Breaux Bridge. Farmers-Merchants, originally established in 1932, also has a branch at 1525 Ambassador Caffery Parkway in Lafayette.

== Career ==
In the nonpartisan blanket primary held on October 20, 2007, the incumbent Democratic representative, Sydnie Mae Maraist Durand, did not seek reelection. In a two-candidate field, Mills, then a Democrat himself, won outright by a wide margin over a fellow Democrat, Marie Etienne of St. Martin Parish, 12,034 (84 percent) to 2,237 (16 percent).

In 2008 and 2009, Mills received a 100 percent rating from the Louisiana Right-to-Life Federation. He has been rated 69 percent by the Louisiana Association of Business and Industry. The Louisiana Family Forum in 2009 rated him at 89 percent.

Mills guided to passage in 2010 legislation to permit pharmacists to administer medication therapy management services to patients in Louisiana. The interest group, the National Association of Chain Drug Stores, supported the legislation. The bill was signed on June 25, 2010, by then Governor Bobby Jindal. The measure authorizes the Louisiana Department of Health and Hospitals to create an MTM pharmacy program.

In 2010, Mills joined several legislative colleagues in switching allegiance from the Democrats to the Republicans. Others who made the switch in December 2010 are Representative Noble Ellington of Winnsboro and State Senators John Alario of Westwego in Jefferson Parish and John R. Smith of Leesville in Vernon Parish.

Mills polled 12,812 votes in the special Senate election, or 60 percent of the total. The runner-up was Simone B. Champagne of Jeanerette, another recent Republican convert and a state representative from Iberia Parish, who received 4,040 votes (19 percent). Champagne campaigned as a "Reagan Republican" and had the open support of U.S. Senator David Vitter; she returned the favor by endorsing Vitter for governor in 2015. Independent David Groner finished third with 2,534 votes (12 percent). The remaining ballots favored two other Republican candidates and a second Independent hopeful. No Democrats ran for the position.

Two Republicans ran in an April 2, 2011, special election to fill the nine months remaining in Mills' House term. St. Martin Parish councilman Mike "Pete" Huval defeated St. Martinville city councilman Craig Prosper, 58 to 42 percent.

Mills held the title of "newest Louisiana state senator" for only a month. Jonathan W. Perry of Kaplan won a special election in District 26 on February 19, 2011 and became the newest state senator at that point.

=== Senate Health and Welfare Committee ===
In January 2016, Senate President John Alario appointed Mills chairman of the Senate Health and Welfare Committee.

As the chairman of the health committee, Mills oversees the state's $12 billion Medicaid program. In 2018, Legislative Auditor Daryl Purpera said that the potential exists for fraud involving hundreds of millions of dollars in Medicaid funds. "Let's understand our risks and exposure and what we can do to mitigate it," Mills told his committee. Purpera earlier said that Medicaid had been "run kind of willy-nilly, loosey-goosey” by the Louisiana Department of Health. Purpera's warning was echoed by U.S. Senator John N. Kennedy and state Attorney General Jeff Landry as well as some state legislators. In a press release, Senator Kennedy said that the public will "happily pay for your doctor if you are too poor to be sick. I'm proud of that. But I'm neither happy about nor proud of the Medicaid fraud tolerated" by the Department of Health. The audits do not specify any specific fraud but mention a "risk group."

Mills was the deciding vote in block a bill by Representative Gabe Firment from making it to the Senate floor that would have banned minors from receiving gender-affirming care.

== Personal life ==
Mills previously served on the St. Martin Parish Council. He and his wife, Deborah K. Mills, reside in St. Martinville but have business interests throughout the parish. He is Roman Catholic.
