= Ted Haik =

American politician

Theodore Michael "Ted" Haik Jr.

Louisiana State Representative for District 49 (Iberia, St. Mary, and Vermilion parishes)
- In office 1976–1996
- Preceded by: J. Richard "Dickie" Breaux
- Succeeded by: Troy Hebert

Personal details
- Born: April 8, 1945 (age 81) New Iberia, Louisiana, USA
- Party: Democratic
- Spouse: Carol Redmond Haik
- Relations: Brother, Judge Richard T. Haik
- Children: Four children, including: Theodore M. Haik, III Eric Timothy Haik
- Education: University of Louisiana at Lafayette; Loyola University New Orleans College of Law
- Occupation: Lawyer

Military service
- Branch/service: Louisiana Army National Guard
- Rank: Captain

Theodore Michael Haik Jr., known as Ted Haik (born April 8, 1945), is an attorney in New Iberia, Louisiana, who was a Democratic member of the Louisiana House of Representatives from 1976 to 1996. He represented House District 49, which includes portions of Iberia, St. Mary, and Vermilion parishes. He is the older brother of U.S. District Judge Richard T. Haik of Lafayette and Suzanne Haik Terrell of New Orleans, the last Louisiana elections commissioner who served from 2000 to 2004 and the unsuccessful Republican candidate in the 2002 U.S. Senate race against the incumbent Democrat Mary Landrieu.

== Background ==
Of Lebanese descent, Haik was born in New Iberia to Theodore Haik, Sr., and the former Margaret Hannie, both deceased. He graduated from the University of Louisiana at Lafayette and holds the Juris Doctor degree from the Roman Catholic-affiliated Loyola University New Orleans College of Law. He is a former captain in the Louisiana Army National Guard. He is a graduate too of the military law course at the University of Virginia.

== Political career ==
Haik was first elected in 1975, when Louisiana established the still-used nonpartisan blanket primary. He won a third term in 1983 over fellow Democrat Kenneth "Kenu" Reeves, 11,107 (62.2 percent) to 6,760 (37.8 percent). Haik won his fifth and final term in 1991, when he again handily defeated another Democrat, James "Jimmy" Romero, 10,444 (67.4 percent) to 5,050 (32.6 percent).

As a legislator, Haik was chairman of the House Insurance and Capital Outlay committees and the Subcommittee on the Environment. He was a member of the Judiciary and the Civil Law and Procedure committees. He received eight awards from civic groups for his legislative service. After retiring from the state House, Haik became under Republican Governor Murphy J. Foster Jr., the first chairman of the Louisiana Property and Casualty Commission, an advisory body consisting of legislators, the Louisiana Department of Insurance, and consumer groups.

The current city attorney in New Iberia, Haik is a former president of the Iberia Parish Bar Association.

== Personal life ==
In 1982, Haik joined three business partners in the purchase for $12.4 million of the Evangeline Downs racetrack in Lafayette.

He is a member of the pastoral council of the Sacred Heart Catholic Church.

Two of Haik's four children, Theodore "Trey" III (born 1972), and Eric Timothy Haik (born 1976), practice law with him in the New Iberia firm Haik, Minvielle, & Grubbs. Haik and his wife, the former Carol Redmond, have two other children as well. Haik's areas of practice include negligence claims, insurance law, criminal defense, corporate law, hospital third-party collections, and Medicaid reimbursement. Some 60 percent of his casework is devoted to litigation.

Trey Haik was narrowly elected as New Iberia city judge in the runoff election held on December 6, 2014. He polled 51.3 percent of the vote against a fellow Republican, Edward Landry.

Preceded by J. Richard "Dickie" Breaux	Louisiana State Representative for District 49 (Iberia, St. Mary, and Vermilion parishes); 1976-1996	Succeeded by Troy Hebert
