= Page Cortez =

American politician and businessman

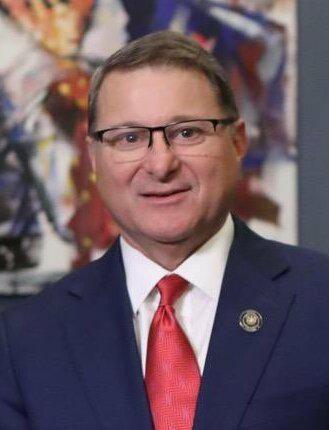

President of the Louisiana Senate
- In office January 13, 2020 – January 8, 2024
- Preceded by: John Alario
- Succeeded by: Cameron Henry

Member of the Louisiana Senate from the 23rd district
- In office January 2012 – January 8, 2024
- Preceded by: Michael Michot
- Succeeded by: Jean-Paul Coussan

Member of the Louisiana House of Representatives from the 43rd district
- In office January 2008 – January 2012
- Preceded by: Ernie Alexander
- Succeeded by: Stuart Bishop

Personal details
- Born: Patrick Page Cortez
- Party: Republican
- Spouse: Angela
- Children: 2
- Education: University of Louisiana, Lafayette (BA)
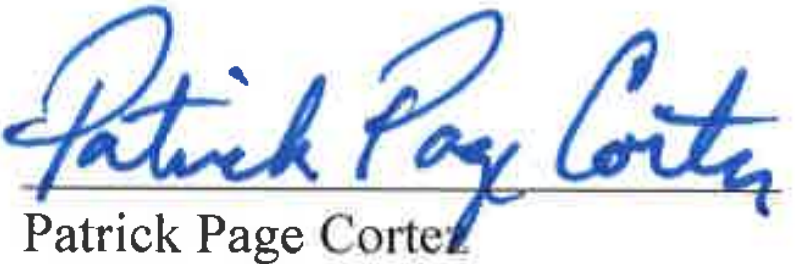
- Signature

Patrick Page Cortez is an American politician and businessman from the state of Louisiana. A Republican, he represented the Louisiana State Senate's 23rd district, based in southern Lafayette, from 2012 to 2024. In 2020, Cortez was unanimously elected Senate President, succeeding term-limited John Alario.

From 2008 until 2012, Cortez represented the 43rd district in the Louisiana House of Representatives. He lives with his wife and two children in Lafayette, where he owns and operates a La-Z-Boy furniture gallery.

Political offices
Preceded by John Alario	President of the Louisiana Senate; 2020–2024	Succeeded by Cameron Henry
