= Chad Michael Boyer =

American politician

Chad Boyer

Member of the Louisiana House of Representatives from the 46th district
- Incumbent
- Assumed office January 8, 2024
- Preceded by: Mike Huval

Personal details
- Party: Republican

Chad Michael Boyer is an American politician serving as a member of the Louisiana House of Representatives from the 46th district. A member of the Republican Party, Boyer has been in office since January 8, 2024.

== Career ==
Boyer ran unopposed to represent District 46 in 2023. Boyer has announced his support for term limits.

In 2024, Boyer voted in favor of advancing House Bill 545 from the Administration of Criminal Justice committee. The bill, filed by Republican Beryl Amedee, would remove legal protections for obscenity from teachers and librarians in all Louisiana public schools.
