= Gregory Krikko Obbott =

- Born: Okon town
- Occupations: Artist and architect
- Known for: his enormous pencil drawings of city-scapes

Gregory "Krikko" Obbott is a contemporary Nigerian-American artist and architect who is best known for his enormous pencil drawings of city-scapes. Some of his works are on display in large public transit hubs, and can be bought from vendors at tourist attractions such as the Empire State Building, the Statue of Liberty, Fifth Avenue, and the Skyscraper Museum. "Krikko" is the name he uses to sign all of his works.

== Notable works ==
Krikko has produced over 15,000 drawings of city buildings, many drawn from postcards and photographs. He is currently producing work through Krikko Productions offices, located on Winthrop Avenue in New Haven, CT. Some of his works include:

- "Super Big Apple" (1995), a 15′×20′ pencil drawing of Manhattan, NYC. The piece required 2,496 pencils to draw, and depicts over 10,000 buildings and 150,000 windows.

== Personal life ==
Krikko comes from Okon town in ikot abasi local government area of akwa ibom state, south Nigeria. He was the only child of his parents. His mother died at his birth, so the sole responsibility fell to his father to raise him.

Krikko was married to and later separated from a popular Nollywood actress OBOT ETUK; they have two(2) kids together namely Obot Ubong and Obot Idara.

Krikko immigrated to the United States from Nigeria in 1974, and later attended the University of Southwestern Louisiana within the School of Arts and Architecture, graduating in 1981. Since 1990, he has been living in New Haven, Connecticut, where he has continued making use of his architectural degree. In 2007 Krikko purchased the building of the former Phillip Fresenius House stable from the city of New Haven for $5,000. The building, located at 210 West Street, atop "The Hill", had been abandoned since the closure of the brewery in 1977. At the time it was purchased by Krikko, the building was structurally unsound and littered with drug needles and animal waste. He plans to turn the building into "A Pencil Museum In the Hill;" a kid-friendly museum with a public gallery and studio space. The city of New Haven has embraced the project, as they seek to rebuild the surrounding area.

Outside of his profession as an artist, Krikko is a passionate jazz saxophonist.
