= Stephen Ortego =

American politician (born 1984)

Stephen Juan Ortego

Louisiana State Representative for District 39 (Lafayette and St. Landry parishes)
- In office January 9, 2012 – January 2016
- Preceded by: Bobby Badon
- Succeeded by: Julie Emerson

Personal details
- Born: February 13, 1984 (age 42) Opelousas, Louisiana, U.S.
- Party: Democratic

Stephen Juan Ortego (born February 13, 1984) is a Democratic former member of the Louisiana House of Representatives from Carencro in Lafayette Parish. He was elected on November 19, 2011 and assumed office on January 9, 2012.

== Biography ==
Ortego was born in Opelousas, Louisiana and reared near the city of Carencro. Ortego graduated from Carencro High School where he served as class president his senior year. He received a legislative scholarship to attend Tulane University from State Representative Clara Baudoin. During his time at Tulane, he learned French at Université Sainte-Anne and became a Louisiana French language activist. He also served as a Catholic missionary in Honduras where he designed and built homes. Ortego left Tulane University in 2007 with a master's degree in architecture.

After Ortego left Tulane, he ran for State Representative for term-limited Baudoin's open seat in 2007. He ran against businessman (and former Carencro mayor) Tommy Angelle, Carencro City Council member Bobby Badon, and former State Representative (and lone Republican) Raymond "La La" Lalonde. Ortego came in third in the primary, behind Badon and Lalonde. Badon went on to win the general election. Following his defeat, Ortego remained active in the community, co-founding Ecolafayette, a design-build firm specializing in energy-efficient homes in Acadiana. He also serves on the board of the World Studies Institute of Louisiana, a group whose mission is to develop a French Immersion academy in Acadiana for high school students. He also worked with the Make It Right Foundation, an organization focused on rebuilding the 9th Ward in post-Katrina New Orleans. In addition, Ortego currently serves on the 232-HELP / LA 211 board of directors.

== 2011 election ==
After incumbent representative Bobby Badon announced he was not running for reelection in August 2011, Ortego announced he was running for the seat again. Ortego described himself as a "cultural conservative" running on a platform of sustaining and growing the cajun/creole culture while also creating incentives for industries to create new jobs by fully utilizing Louisiana's energy and cultural resources. He won a hard-fought race against the Democrat-turned-Republican Donald "Don" Menard, a small businessman and two-term President of St. Landry Parish. Ortego polled 4,457 (55 percent) to Menard's 3,651 (45 percent) in a general election. This was a reversal of the primary election in which Menard polled 4,555(44 percent) to Ortego's 3590 (35 percent). Third party candidate James "Jamie" Arnaud polled 2,103 (21 percent).

== Legislation ==
=== Alternative Fuels ===
In 2012 Stephen Ortego passed bills HB 1061 and HB 1213 in an effort to promote the Louisiana Oil and Gas Industry and to improve the efficiency of government vehicles. HB 1213 ordered that state vehicles would run on either propane or natural gas, exemptions to the law were in situations that would not be economically effective. HB 1061 was signed into law by Gov. Jindal as Act 433.

Bryan Cordill of Cordill Propane Service, Louisiana Propane Gas Association said "Thank you to Rep. Stephen Ortego for taking the lead in supporting Louisiana's energy industry with House Bills 1061 and 1213. HB 1061 makes propane gas more available for public use by authorizing the sale of propane autogas through self-service pumps."

Ortego himself said "It makes sense to promote the use of our own resources," Ortego said. "Louisiana is the No. 1 producer of natural gas and the No. 2 producer of propane in the United States. "The most important thing to me is that we could lead the nation in energy independence," he said. "It's clean burning, better for the environment and promotes our own energy industry."

Ortego was narrowly unseated in his bid for a second term in the House in the primary election held on October 24, 2015. He received 5,902 votes (49 percent); the victorious Republican, Julie Emerson, polled 6,149 ballots (51 percent).

Louisiana House of Representatives
Preceded by Bobby Badon	Louisiana State Representative for District 39 (Lafayette and St. Landry parishes); 2012–2016	Succeeded by Julie Emerson
