= Vincent Pierre =

American politician

Member of the Louisiana House of Representatives from the 44th district
- Incumbent
- Assumed office January 9, 2012
- Preceded by: Rickey Hardy
- Succeeded by: Tehmi Jahi Chassion

Personal details
- Born: Vincent Joseph Pierre
- Party: Democratic
- Education: Southern University

Vincent Joseph Pierre is an American politician who has served as a Democratic member for the 44th district of the Louisiana House of Representatives since 2012.

== Biography ==
Pierre graduated from the Holy Rosary Institute in Lafayette, Louisiana, and attended at the Southern University, where he earned a degree. Pierre later worked as a businessperson. In 2012, he won the election for the 44th district of the Louisiana House of Representatives, succeeding Rickey Hardy. He assumed his office on January 9, 2012. He was elected to lead the Louisiana Legislative Black Caucus in 2022.

== Personal life ==
Pierre is Catholic.
