= Annie Spell =

American politician

Member of the Louisiana House of Representatives from the 45th district
- Incumbent
- Assumed office April 14, 2025
- Preceded by: Brach Myers

Personal details
- Party: Republican

Annie Spell is an American politician serving as a member of the Louisiana House of Representatives from the 45th district. A member of the Republican Party, Spell was elected unopposed to finish the term of Brach Myers, who was elected to serve in the Louisiana Senate.

== Early life and education ==
A resident of Lafayette, Spell was raised in the city and earned her degrees from the University of Louisiana at Lafayette and Louisiana State University. She is a clinical psychologist by profession.
