= Craig Romero =

American politician (born 1954)

Craig Francis Romero

Louisiana State Senator from District 22 (Iberia, Lafayette, St. Martin, and Vermilion parishes)
- In office 1993–2008
- Preceded by: Oswald A. Decuir
- Succeeded by: Troy Hebert

Iberia Parish Commission
- In office 1984–1992

Personal details
- Born: September 25, 1954 (age 71)
- Party: Republican
- Occupation: Corporate Salesman

Craig Francis Romero (born September 25, 1954) is a Louisiana corporate salesman who represented District 22 in the Louisiana State Senate from 1993 to 2008.

In 2004, Romero ran for the Third District seat but finished third in the state's unique jungle primary. In the 2004 race, Romero faced the retiring Tauzin's son, Republican Billy Tauzin III and Democrat Charlie Melancon of Napoleonville, the seat of Assumption Parish. Under the jungle primary system, if the leading candidate does not receive over 50 percent of the vote, the top two finishers in a race – regardless of party affiliation – advance to a runoff election, which is held several weeks after the national general election.

== Personal history ==
They have seven children, Hannah, Jacob, Sarah, Bethany, Danielle, and Isaac. Isaac died at age 23 in a single-vehicle car crash in August 2018.

Louisiana State Senate
Preceded by Oswald A. Decuir (D)	Louisiana State Senator from District 22 (Iberia, Lafayette, St. Martin, and Vermilion parishes); Craig Francis Romero (R); 1993–2008	Succeeded by Troy Hebert (D)
