= Brach Myers =

American politician

Member of the Louisiana Senate from the 23rd district
- Incumbent
- Assumed office March 11, 2025
- Preceded by: Jean-Paul Coussan

Member of the Louisiana House of Representatives from the 45th district
- In office January 8, 2024 – March 11, 2025
- Preceded by: Jean-Paul Coussan
- Succeeded by: Annie Spell

Personal details
- Party: Republican

Brach Jerad Myers is an American politician serving as a member of the Louisiana Senate from the 23rd district. A member of the Republican Party, Myers has been in office since March 11, 2025.

== Career ==
Myers is the Senior Vice President of Corporate Development at the LHC Group. Myers won the election to represent District 45 in the Louisiana House of Representatives on October 14, 2023, with 70% of the vote against Paul "Scott" LeBleu's 25%. He was elected to the Louisiana Senate in a 2025 special election, defeating Jesse Regan. Myers replaced Jean-Paul Coussan, who was elected to serve on the state public service commission.
