= Louisiana's 22nd State Senate district =

American legislative district

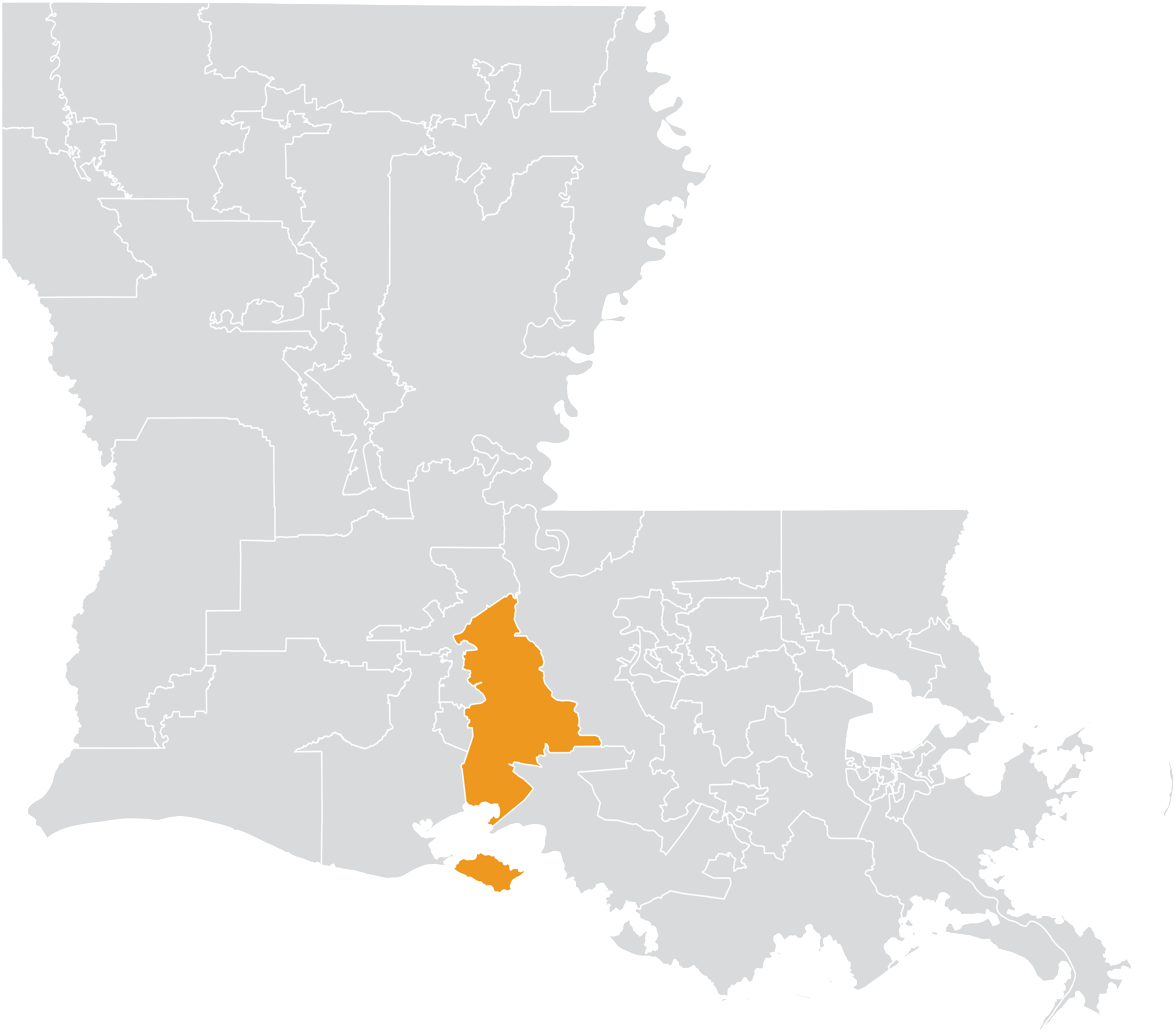
Senator
Blake Miguez; R–New Iberia
- Registration: 42.2% Democratic; 32.0% Republican; 25.7% No party preference
- Demographics: 66% White; 26% Black; 4% Hispanic; 2% Asian; 2% Other
- Population (2019): 121,047
- Registered voters: 82,279

Louisiana's 22nd State Senate district is one of 39 districts in the Louisiana State Senate. It has been represented by Republican Blake Miguez since 2024.

== Geography ==
District 22 covers parts of Iberia, Lafayette, St. Landry, and St. Martin Parishes to the east of the city of Lafayette, including some or all of New Iberia, St. Martinville, Breaux Bridge, Port Barre, and Broussard.

The district overlaps with Louisiana's 3rd and 5th congressional districts, and with 38th, 46th, 48th, 49th, and 96th districts of the Louisiana House of Representatives.

== Recent election results ==
Louisiana uses a jungle primary system. If no candidate receives 50% in the first round of voting, when all candidates appear on the same ballot regardless of party, the top-two finishers advance to a runoff election.

=== 2023 ===
2023 Louisiana State Senate election, District 22
Party	Candidate	Votes	%
Republican	Blake Miguez	19,559	61.2
Republican	Hugh Andre	6,608	20.7
Democratic	Melinda Mitchell	3,701	11.6
Democratic	Phanat Xanamane	1,794	5.6
Independent	Dexter Lathan	299	0.9
Total votes		31,961	100
Republican hold			

=== 2019 ===
2019 Louisiana State Senate election, District 22
Party	Candidate	Votes	%
Republican	Fred Mills (incumbent)	Unopposed	100
Total votes		Unopposed	100
Republican hold			

=== 2015 ===
2015 Louisiana State Senate election, District 22
Party	Candidate	Votes	%
Republican	Fred Mills (incumbent)	Unopposed	100
Total votes		Unopposed	100
Republican hold			

=== 2011 ===
2011 Louisiana State Senate election, District 22
Party	Candidate	Votes	%
Republican	Fred Mills (incumbent)	Unopposed	100
Total votes		Unopposed	100
Republican hold			

=== Federal and statewide results ===
Year	Office	Results
2020	President	Trump 70.6–28.1%
2019	Governor (runoff)	Rispone 64.6–35.4%
2016	President	Trump 69.2–28.3%
2015	Governor (runoff)	Vitter 52.7–47.3%
2014	Senate (runoff)	Cassidy 65.9–34.1%
2012	President	Romney 66.7–32.1%
