= Sandra Peuler =

American judge

Sandra Peuler is a judge of the Utah Third District Court in Salt Lake City. She was appointed to the bench by former Governor Michael O. Leavitt. She served as Chief Judge of the court from 2001 to 2007.

Peuler holds a J.D. from the University of Baltimore.
