= Louisiana's 23rd State Senate district =

American legislative district

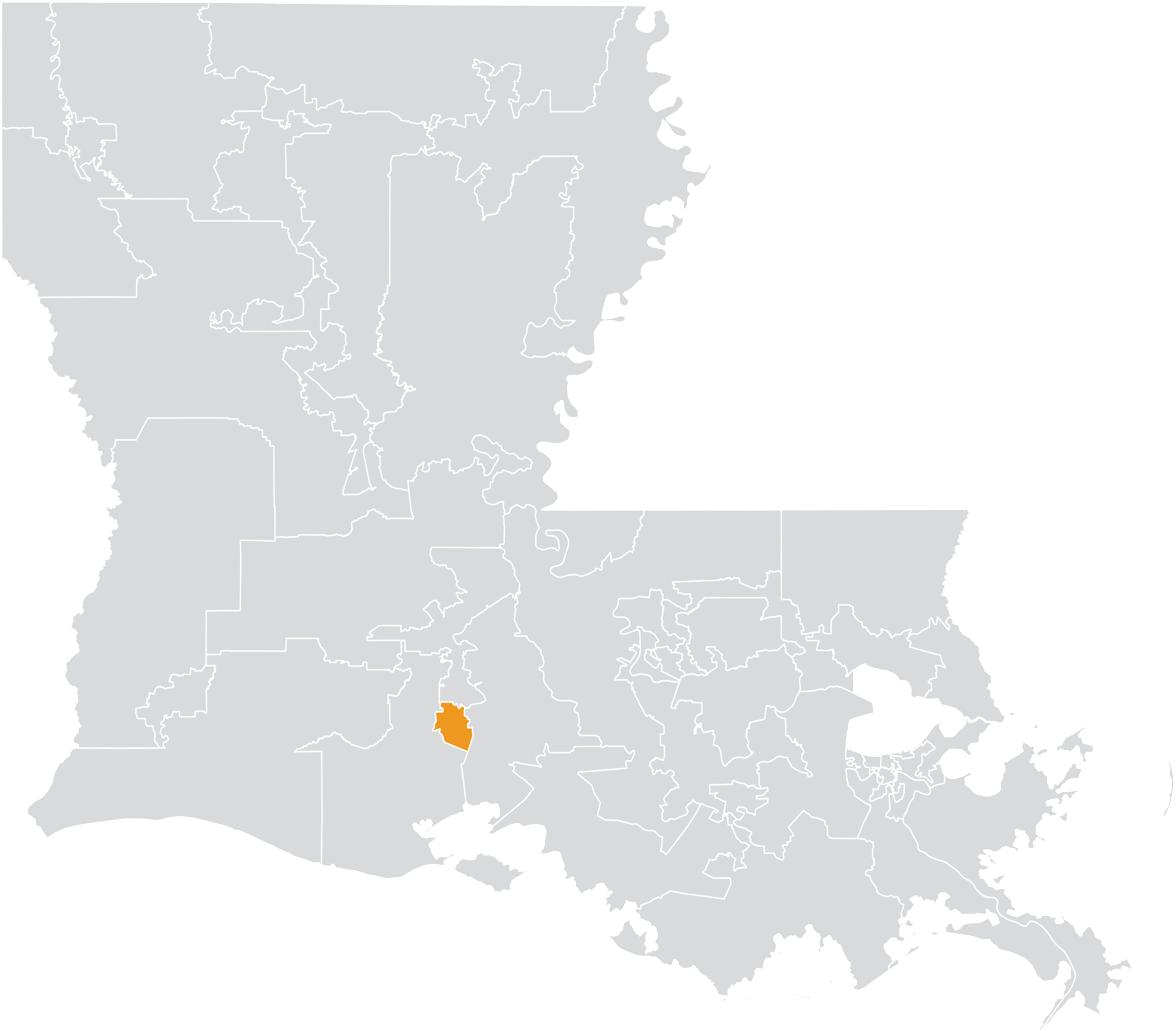
Senator
Brach Myers; R–Lafayette
- Registration: 47.6% Republican; 23.8% Democratic; 28.5% No party preference
- Demographics: 79% White; 12% Black; 4% Hispanic; 3% Asian; 2% Other
- Population (2019): 136,049
- Registered voters: 87,984

Louisiana's 23rd State Senate district is one of 39 districts in the Louisiana State Senate. It has been represented by Republican Page Cortez, the current Senate President, since 2012.

== Geography ==
District 23 is based in Lafayette Parish, including much of southern Lafayette as well as the suburban towns of Broussard, Scott, and Youngsville.

The district is located entirely within Louisiana's 3rd congressional district, and overlaps with the 31st, 43rd, 44th, 45th, and 48th districts of the Louisiana House of Representatives.

== Recent election results ==
Louisiana uses a jungle primary system. If no candidate receives 50% in the first round of voting, when all candidates appear on the same ballot regardless of party, the top-two finishers advance to a runoff election.

=== 2025 ===
2025 Louisiana Senate special election, District 23
Party	Candidate	Votes	%
Republican	Brach Myers	6,769	54.8
Republican	Jesse Regan	5,591	45.2
Total votes		12,360	100
Republican hold			

=== 2019 ===
2019 Louisiana State Senate election, District 23
Party	Candidate	Votes	%
Republican	Page Cortez (incumbent)	Unopposed	100
Total votes		Unopposed	100
Republican hold			

=== 2015 ===
2015 Louisiana State Senate election, District 23
Party	Candidate	Votes	%
Republican	Page Cortez (incumbent)	27,231	83.9
Independent	Terry Hughes	5,235	16.1
Total votes		32,466	100
Republican hold			

=== 2011 ===
2011 Louisiana State Senate election, District 23
Party	Candidate	Votes	%
Republican	Page Cortez	Unopposed	100
Total votes		Unopposed	100
Republican hold			

=== Federal and statewide results ===
Year	Office	Results
2020	President	Trump 71.3–26.4%
2019	Governor (runoff)	Rispone 69.1–30.9%
2016	President	Trump 74.3–20.3%
2015	Governor (runoff)	Vitter 63.1–36.9%
2014	Senate (runoff)	Cassidy 80.4–19.6%
2012	President	Romney 78.4–19.4%
