= Julie Emerson =

American politician

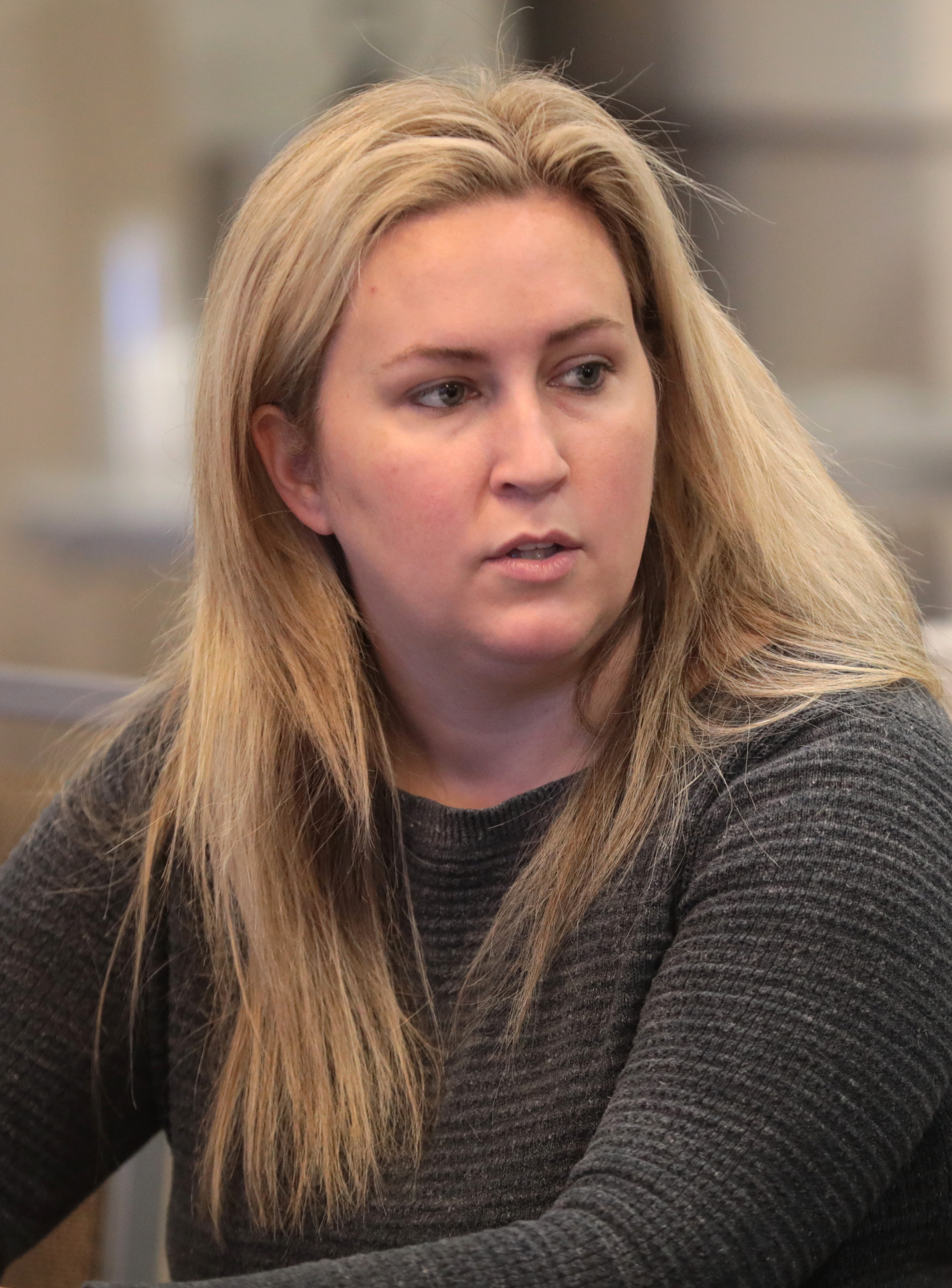

Member of the Louisiana House of Representatives from the 39th district
- In office January 2016 – February 11, 2026
- Preceded by: Stephen Ortego
- Succeeded by: Doyle Boudreaux

Personal details
- Born: February 29, 1988 (age 38) Homer, Louisiana, U.S.
- Party: Republican
- Education: University of Louisiana, Lafayette (BS); University of South Carolina (MBA)
- Website: Campaign website

Julie Cathryn Emerson (born 1988) is a politician from Carencro, Louisiana, United States. Emerson is a former Republican member of the Louisiana House of Representatives for District 39 in Lafayette and St. Landry parishes in South Louisiana, and was a candidate for the 2026 U.S. Senate election in Louisiana.

== Electoral history ==
On January 11, 2016, she succeeded incumbent Democratic state Representative Stephen Ortego, whom she unseated in the primary election held on October 24, 2015. Emerson polled 6,149 votes (51 percent) to Ortego's 5,902 (49 percent).

In 2019, Emerson was re-elected for a second term. She won re-election with 70% of the vote.

In 2023, Emerson was re-elected for a third term, garnering 72% of the vote against Mckinley James Jr., a Democrat who received 28% of the vote.

In October 2025, Emerson announced she would challenge Bill Cassidy for his seat in the United States Senate. She ended her campaign in January 2026 after President Donald Trump endorsed U.S. Representative Julia Letlow.

In February 2026, Emerson resigned from the Louisiana House of Representatives in order to become Chief of Staff to Louisiana Governor Jeff Landry.
