= Michael Huval =

American politician

Mike "Pete" Huval

Member of the Louisiana House of Representatives for the 46th district
- In office April 2011 – January 2024
- Preceded by: Fred Henry Mills, Jr.
- Succeeded by: Chad Michael Boyer

Member of St. Martin Parish Council, District 4
- In office 1996–2024

Personal details
- Born: Michael Paul Huval; February 1956 (age 70) St. Martinville, Louisiana
- Party: Democratic (until 2011); Republican (since 2011)
- Spouse: Monica Mayeux Huval
- Children: 1 (from previous marriage)
- Occupation: Insurance agent, politician

Michael Huval, also known as Mike "Pete" Huval (born February 28, 1956), is an American politician and insurance agent from Breaux Bridge, Louisiana who served as a Republican member of the Louisiana House of Representatives for District 46 in St. Martin Parish from 2011 until 2024.

== Early life and education ==
A native of St. Martin Parish, Huval attended the University of Louisiana at Lafayette. He is a former president of both the Breaux Bridge Chamber of Commerce and the local Kiwanis International.

== Career ==
A former Democrat who switched parties to make the state House race, Huval previously served for nearly sixteen years from District 4 on the St. Martin Parish governing council. He won his first race for the council, then known as the police jury, in the fall of 1995, with 51 percent of the vote in a three-candidate all Democratic race. In that capacity, he was active in the Louisiana Police Jury Association. In 2003, he launched Mike Huval Agency, a private insurance firm based in Breaux Bridge and Opelousas in St. Landry Parish.

Huval won his House seat on April 2, 2011, in a special election to fill the vacancy created by the election of Representative Fred Mills to the Louisiana State Senate. Huval defeated fellow Republican Craig G. Prosper, a city council member from the parish seat of St. Martinville, 4,338 (58 percent) to 3,144 votes (42 percent).

== Personal life ==
He and his family are active in the St. Joseph Catholic Church in Parks in St. Martin Parish. He is also a member of the Knights of Columbus Catholic men's organization. Huval and his wife, Monica (née Mayeux), reside in the City of Breaux Bridge of St. Martin Parish, Louisiana. He is the father of one grown daughter, Brooke Lynn Huval.

Huval speaks French, and in December 2022, spoke with the French president Emmanuel Macron during the latter's visit to Louisiana.

Louisiana House of Representatives
Preceded by Fred Henry Mills, Jr.	Louisiana State Representative for District 46 (St. Landry Parish); 2011–	Succeeded by Incumbent
