= Louisiana's 39th House of Representatives district =

American legislative district

Louisiana's 39th State House of Representatives district
Representative
Julie Emerson; R–Carencro

Louisiana's 39th House of Representatives district is one of 105 Louisiana House of Representatives districts. It is currently represented by Republican Julie Emerson of Carencro.

== Geography ==
HD39 includes the cities of Carencro, and Scott, as well as a small portion of the city of Lafayette.

== Election results ==
Year	Winning candidate	Party	Percent	Opponent	Party	Percent
2011	Stephen Ortego	Democratic	55%	Don Mernard	Republican	45%
2015	Julie Emerson	Republican	51%	Stephen Ortego	Democratic	49%
2019	Julie Emerson	Republican	70.1%	Paul Carter	Democratic	29.9%
2023	Julie Emerson	Republican	71.7%	McKinley James Jr.	Democratic	28.3%
