= Breaux Bridge, Louisiana =

Breaux Bridge Pont-Breaux (French) Pont-(de)-Breaux (Cajun French)
- City
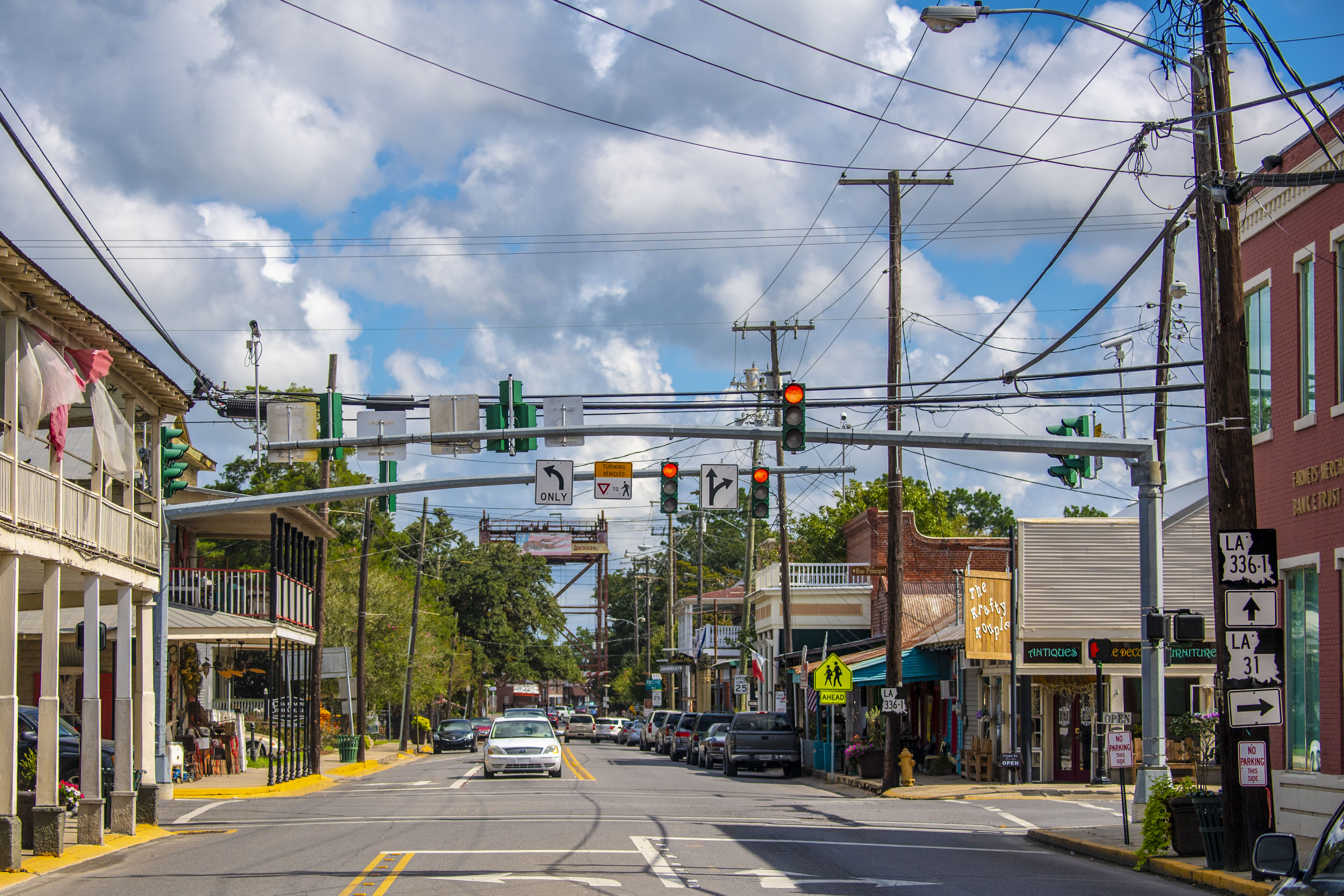
- Downtown Breaux Bridge
- Nicknames: Pont-Breaux; La Capitale Mondiale de l’Écrevisse (Crawfish Capital of the World)
- Location of Breaux Bridge in St. Martin Parish, Louisiana.

- Location of Louisiana in the United States
- Coordinates: 30°16′25.1″N 91°53′57.6″W
- Country: United States
- State: Louisiana
- Parish: St. Martin

Government

Area
  - Total: 7.90 sq mi (20.45 km^{2})
  - Land: 7.71 sq mi (19.98 km^{2})
  - Water: 0.18 sq mi (0.46 km^{2})
- Elevation: 23 ft (7.0 m)

Population (2020)
  - Total: 7,513
  - Density: 973.7/sq mi (375.96/km^{2})
- Time zone: UTC-6 (CST)
  - Summer (DST): UTC-5 (CDT)
- Postal code: 70517
- Area code: 337
- FIPS code: 22-09340
- Website: https://breauxbridgela.net/

Breaux Bridge (/ˈbroʊˈbrɪdʒ/; French: Pont-Breaux; Cajun French: Pont-(de)-Breaux pronounced [pɔ̃ndbʁo]) is a city in St. Martin Parish, Louisiana, United States. The population was 7,513 in 2020. It is part of the Lafayette metropolitan statistical area.

Originally dubbed La Capitale Mondiale de l’Écrevisse, by its French-speaking residents, Breaux Bridge was officially designated the "Crawfish Capital of the World" by Bob Angelle, then serving as Speaker of the Louisiana House of Representatives.

Breaux Bridge hosts an annual Crawfish Festival. It is regionally noted for its practice of listing people by nicknames in the town's telephone directory.

== History ==
Firmin Breaux was a pioneer from Acadia, who settled here after expulsion by the British in what is now eastern Canada. He is known to have arrived in the area during early 1765 (after the British defeat of the French in 1763). By 1774, his branding iron was registered. By 1786 he was one of the largest property owners in the Bayou Têche country.

In 1799, Breaux built a footbridge across the Bayou Têche to help his family and neighbors make the passage. This first bridge was a suspension footbridge, likely made of rope and small planks. It was stabilized by being tied to small pilings located at each end of the bridge as well as to a pair of huge live oak trees on both sides of the bayou. When traveling directions were given, residents would often instruct people to "go to Breaux's bridge . . ." This was later adopted as the city's name.

On August 25, 1829, the widow Scholastique (Picou) Breaux founded Breaux Bridge, Louisiana at the age of 33. She was born Scholastique Melanie Picou on July 25, 1796. At a young age, she had married Agricole Breaux. Together, they had five children. In 1817, the couple replaced the Bayou Têche suspension footbridge built by Agricole's father Fermin with a vehicular bridge that allowed wagon passage and made way for the area's increasing commerce. At the age of 32, her husband died and Breaux was widowed.

A determined Acadian woman, Scholastique drew up Plan de la Ville du Pont des Breaux (“Plan for the City of Breaux Bridge”), which included a detailed map of the area and a diagram of streets. She developed the area by selling land lots to other Acadian settlers. In 1847, a church parish was created. Twelve years later, the area was officially incorporated. After founding the town, Scholastique remarried. She had two more children with her second husband.

== Geography ==
According to the United States Census Bureau, the city has a total area of 6.7 square miles (17 km^{2}), of which 6.6 square miles (17 km^{2}) is land and 0.1 square miles (0.26 km^{2}) is water.

== Demographics ==
Historical population
Census	Pop.	Note	%±
1880	443		—
1890	654		47.6%
1900	654		0.0%
1910	1,339		104.7%
1920	1,171		−12.5%
1930	1,399		19.5%
1940	1,668		19.2%
1950	2,492		49.4%
1960	3,303		32.5%
1970	4,942		49.6%
1980	5,922		19.8%
1990	6,515		10.0%
2000	7,281		11.8%
2010	8,139		11.8%
2020	7,513		−7.7%
2025 (est.)	7,652	▲	1.9%
U.S. Decennial Census

Breaux Bridge racial composition as of 2020
Race	Number	Percentage
White (non-Hispanic)	3,629	48.3%
Black or African American (non-Hispanic)	3,331	44.34%
Native American	29	0.39%
Asian	68	0.91%
Pacific Islander	1	0.01%
Other/Mixed	263	3.5%
Hispanic or Latino	192	2.56%

According to the 2020 United States census, there were 7,513 people, 2,944 households, and 2,171 families residing in the city. As of the 2010 United States census, there were 8,139 people living in the city; 50.0% were White, 47.3% African American, 0.4% Native American, 0.6% Asian, 0.4% from some other race and 1.3% from two or more races. 1.3% were Hispanic or Latino of any race.

As of the census of 2000, there were 7,281 people, 2,512 households, and 1,821 families living in the city. The population density was 1,111.7 inhabitants per square mile (429.2/km^{2}). There were 2,740 housing units at an average density of 418.3 per square mile (161.5/km^{2}). The racial makeup of the city was 49.84% White, 48.66% African American, 0.11% Native American, 0.32% Asian, 0.27% from other races, and 0.80% from two or more races. Hispanic or Latino of any race were 0.65% of the population. Of the population over the age of five, 68.3% spoke English at home, 28.3% spoke French, 1.7% spoke Spanish, and 1.6% spoke Louisiana Creole French.

There were 2,512 households, out of which 38.3% had children under the age of 18 living with them, 42.9% were married couples living together, 24.9% had a female householder with no husband present, and 27.5% were non-families. 23.5% of all households were made up of individuals, and 8.8% had someone living alone who was 65 years of age or older. The average household size was 2.73 and the average family size was 3.23.

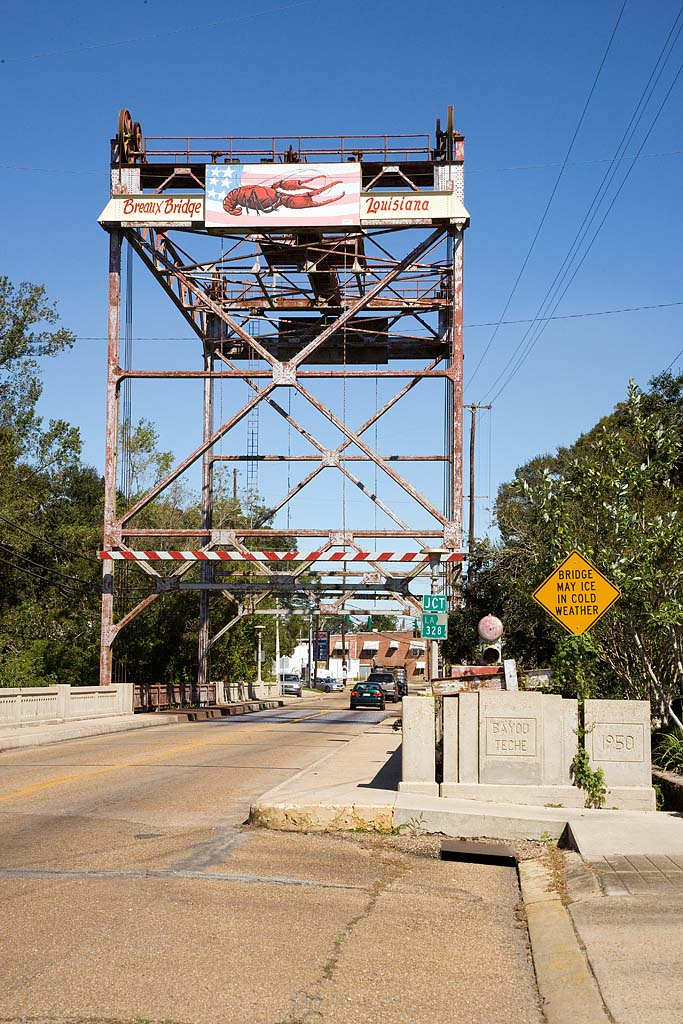
Bridge over Bayou Teche in Breaux Bridge

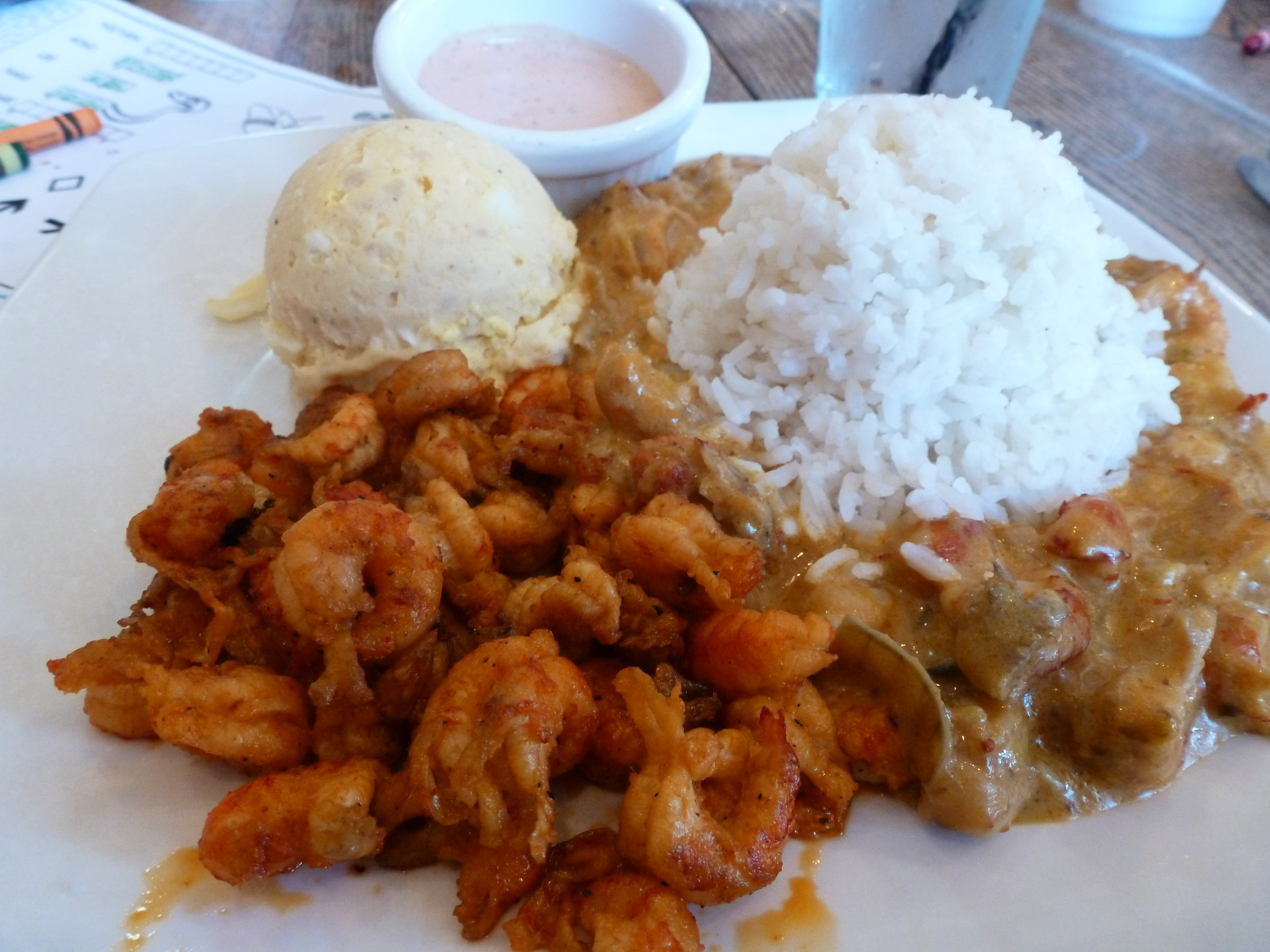
Crawfish Étouffée in Breaux Bridge

In the city, the population was spread out, with 30.1% under the age of 18, 10.7% from 18 to 24, 28.0% from 25 to 44, 19.0% from 45 to 64, and 12.2% who were 65 years of age or older. The median age was 32 years. For every 100 females, there were 92.2 males. For every 100 females age 18 and over, there were 87.6 males.

The median income for a household in the city was $25,102, and the median income for a family was $31,570. Males had a median income of $30,880 versus $17,819 for females. The per capita income for the city was $12,536. About 26.8% of families and 30.7% of the population were below the poverty line, including 43.0% of those under age 18 and 25.8% of those age 65 or over.

== Education ==
Public schools in St. Martin Parish are operated by the St. Martin Parish School Board. The city of Breaux Bridge is zoned to Breaux Bridge Primary School (Grades PK-2), Breaux Bridge Elementary (Grades 3-5), Breaux Bridge Junior High School (Grades 6-8), and Breaux Bridge High School (Grades 9-12).

Private schools include St. Bernard Elementary (Grades PreK-8) and Louisiana Christian School (Grades PreK-12).

== Notable people ==
- Scott Angelle, former interim Lieutenant Governor of Louisiana (2010) and member of the Louisiana Public Service Commission from District 2, son of J. Burton Angelle
- Ryan Broussard, actor known for Alert: Missing Persons Unit
- Lottie Beebe, superintendent of St. Martin Parish public schools; member of the Louisiana Board of Elementary and Secondary Education, resides in Breaux Bridge
- Paula Davis, member of the Louisiana House of Representatives for District 69 in East Baton Rouge Parish; native of Breaux Bridge
- Jake Delhomme, former quarterback for the NFL's Houston Texans, Cleveland Browns, Carolina Panthers and New Orleans Saints
- Sonny Landreth, blues guitarist
- Hunter Hayes, singer-songwriter, record producer
- Mike "Pete" Huval, state representative; former member of the St. Martin Parish Council, insurance agent
- Jules Jeanmard, Roman Catholic bishop
- Ali Landry, Miss Louisiana Teen USA 1990, Miss Louisiana USA 1996, Miss USA 1996, and actress and model
- Branford Marsalis, jazz musician and former band leader for The Tonight Show
- Fred H. Mills, Jr., state senator and president of Farmers-Merchants Bank and Trust Co. in Breaux Bridge
- Domanick Williams, former running back for the Houston Texans, 2003 Pepsi NFL Rookie of the Year
