= Joel Robideaux =

American politician (born 1962)

Mayor-President of Lafayette Parish
- In office January 4, 2016 – January 6, 2020
- Preceded by: Joey Durel
- Succeeded by: Josh Guillory

Speaker pro tempore of the Louisiana House of Representatives
- In office January 11, 2012 – January 13, 2016
- Preceded by: Karen Carter Peterson
- Succeeded by: Walt Leger III

Member of the Louisiana House of Representatives from the 45th district
- In office 2004–2016
- Preceded by: Mert Smiley
- Succeeded by: Jean-Paul Coussan

Personal details
- Born: October 5, 1962 (age 63) Lafayette, Louisiana, U.S.
- Party: Republican
- Spouse: Bobette
- Children: 3
- Education: University of Louisiana at Lafayette (BS)
- Profession: Accountant

Joel Robideaux (born October 5, 1962) is an American politician and accountant who served as the Mayor-President of Lafayette Parish from 2016 to 2020. He was previously a member of the Louisiana House of Representatives, representing the 45th district from 2004 to 2016, and served as Speaker pro tempore of the Louisiana House of Representatives from 2012 to 2016.

== Early life and education ==
Robideaux was born in Lafayette, Louisiana. He earned a Bachelor of Science degree in accounting from the University of Louisiana at Lafayette.

== Career ==
Robideaux began his career as an accountant. In 2004, he was elected to the Louisiana House of Representatives, where he served for twelve years. During his tenure, he was known for his work on fiscal policy and tax reform.

In 2015, Robideaux ran for the position of Mayor-President of Lafayette Parish. He won the election and served from January 2016 to January 2020. As Mayor-President, he focused on economic development, infrastructure improvement, and public safety. One of his major achievements was managing the city's response to the 2016 flood. He also led the initiative for a $100 million replacement of the Heymann Center.

Robideaux faced challenges, including controversies over police department pay raises and vetoing funding for the Louisiana Avenue extension.

== Personal life ==
Robideaux is married to Bobette, and they have three children.
