= Joey Durel =

American politician (born 1953)

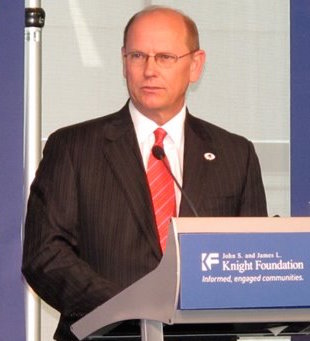

Mayor-President of Lafayette Parish
- In office 15 July 2004 – 18 July 2016
- Preceded by: Walter Comeaux
- Succeeded by: Joel Robideaux

Personal details
- Born: Lester Joseph Durel Jr. April 3, 1953 (age 72) Lafayette, Louisiana, U.S.
- Party: Republican
- Spouse: Lynne Miller Durel (m. 1973)
- Children: 3
- Profession: Business executive

Lester Joseph Durel Jr. (born April 3, 1953), known as Joey Durel, is an American businessman and politician who served as the mayor of Lafayette, Louisiana from 2004 to 2016. Elected in 2003, he became the second Republican mayor of his city and the second person elected as "City-Parish president" of the combined City of Lafayette and Lafayette Parish government.

Before entering politics, Durel was a businessman. He based his 2003 campaign on his status as a political outsider. After leaving office, Durel was hired by IberiaBank.

Preceded by Walter Comeaux	Mayor-President of the Lafayette, Louisiana, City/Parish Consolidated Government; 2004–2016	Succeeded by Joel Robideaux
