= Louisiana's 82nd House of Representatives district =

American legislative district

Louisiana's 82nd State House of Representatives district
Representative
Laurie Schlegel; R–Old Metairie

Louisiana's 82nd House of Representatives district is one of 105 Louisiana House of Representatives districts. It is currently represented by Republican Laurie Schlegel of Old Metairie, Louisiana.

== Geography ==
HD82 makes up the northern border of Jefferson Parish. It spans through Jefferson Parish, including portions of Metairie, Harahan, Kenner, and Elmwood.

== Election results ==
Year	Winning candidate	Party	Percent	Opponent	Party	Percent	Opponent	Party	Percent
1995	Steve Scalise	Republican	68%	Alfred Ferry	Democratic	25%	Eddie Lirette	Other	7%
1999	Steve Scalise	Republican	66%	Troy Keller	Republican	34%			
2003	Steve Scalise	Republican	Cancelled						
2007	Cameron Henry	Republican	57%	Christopher Tidmore	Republican	43%			
2011	Cameron Henry	Republican	Cancelled						
2015	Cameron Henry	Republican	Cancelled						
2019	Charles Henry	Republican	70.5%	Trey Mustian	Democratic	29.5%			
2021 - Special	Laurie Schlegel	Republican	51.9%	Edwin Connick	Republican	48.1%			
2023	Laurie Schlegel	Republican	Cancelled						
