= 2018 United States House of Representatives elections in Louisiana =

- November 6, 2018

All 6 Louisiana seats to the United States House of Representatives
	Majority party	Minority party
Party	Republican	Democratic
Last election	5	1
Seats won	5	1
Seat change	Steady	Steady
Popular vote	835,686	553,162
Percentage	57.21%	37.87%
Swing	▼9.23%	▲6.61%

Republican
40–50%
50–60%
60–70%
70–80%
80–90%
Democratic
40–50%
50–60%
60–70%
80–90%

The 2018 United States House of Representatives elections in Louisiana were held on November 6, 2018, to elect the six U.S. representatives from the state of Louisiana, one from each of the state's six congressional districts. The elections coincided with other elections to the House of Representatives, elections to the United States Senate, and various state and local elections.

Like most Louisiana elections, these were conducted using a jungle primary that occurred on November 6, where all candidates ran on the same ballot in the primary, regardless of party. Any candidate who earned an absolute majority of the vote in the primary would be automatically declared the winner of the election. However, if in any given congressional district no candidate gained an absolute majority of the votes, a runoff election between the top two candidates within said congressional district would have been held on December 8. Nevertheless, the incumbent representatives in all six districts each earned over 50% of the vote in the jungle primaries, so no runoffs occurred.

== Overview ==
Popular vote
Republican	57.21%
Democratic	37.87%
Other	4.96%

House seats
Republican	83.33%
Democratic	16.67%

=== By district ===
Results of the 2018 United States House of Representatives elections in Louisiana by district:

District	Republican		Democratic		Others		Total		Result
District	Votes	%	Votes	%	Votes	%	Votes	%	Result
District 1	192,555	71.49%	71,521	26.56%	5,249	1.95%	269,325	100.0%	Republican hold
District 2	0	0.00%	190,182	80.59%	45,800	19.41%	235,982	100.0%	Democratic hold
District 3	168,263	68.41%	74,713	30.38%	2,967	1.21%	245,943	100.0%	Republican hold
District 4	139,326	64.24%	72,934	33.63%	4,612	2.13%	216,872	100.0%	Republican hold
District 5	149,018	66.54%	67,118	29.97%	7,810	3.49%	223,946	100.0%	Republican hold
District 6	186,553	69.47%	76,716	28.57%	5,256	1.96%	268,525	100.0%	Republican hold
Total	835,715	57.22%	553,184	37.87%	71,694	4.91%	1,460,593	100.0%	

== District 1 ==
2018 Louisiana's 1st congressional district election
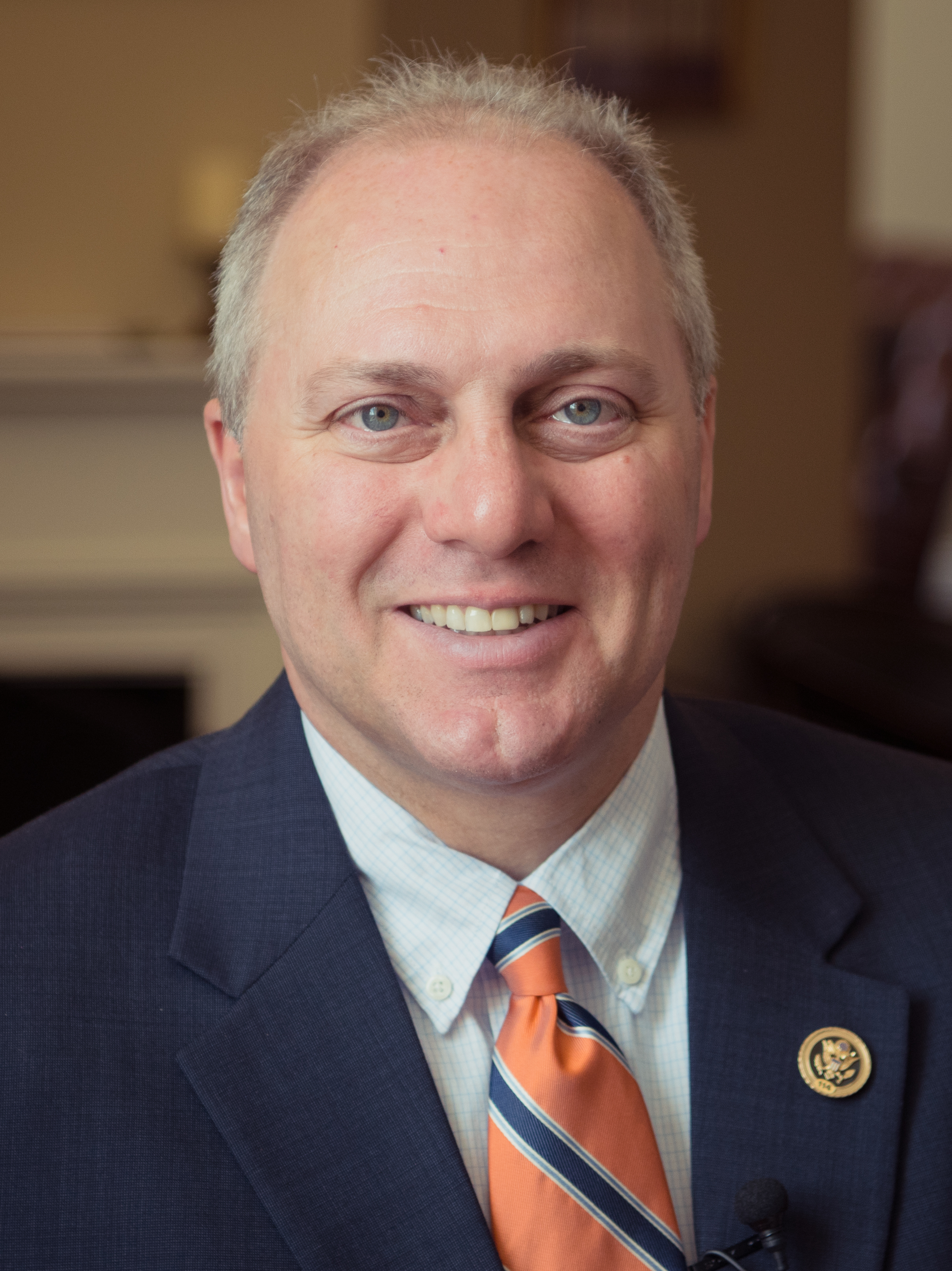

Candidate	Steve Scalise	Tammy Savoie	Lee Ann Dugas
Party	Republican	Democratic	Democratic
Popular vote	192,526	44,262	18,552
Percentage	71.5%	16.4%	6.9%
- Parish results Scalise: 40–50% 60–70% 70–80% 80–90%
U.S. Representative before election
Steve Scalise
Republican
Elected U.S. Representative
Steve Scalise
Republican

The 1st district is located in the Greater New Orleans area, covering much of the southeastern area of Louisiana along the Mississippi River Delta, taking in Dulac, Hammond, and Slidell. This is a heavily Republican district, and had a PVI of R+24. Incumbent Steve Scalise had represented this district since 2008 and was reelected in 2016 with 75%.

=== General election ===
==== Predictions ====
Source	Ranking	As of
The Cook Political Report	Safe R	November 5, 2018
Inside Elections	Safe R	November 5, 2018
Sabato's Crystal Ball	Safe R	November 5, 2018
RCP	Safe R	November 5, 2018
Daily Kos	Safe R	November 5, 2018
538	Safe R	November 7, 2018
CNN	Safe R	October 31, 2018
Politico	Safe R	November 4, 2018

=== Debate ===
2018 Louisiana's 1st congressional district democratic candidates debate
No.	Date	Host	Moderator	Link	Democratic	Democratic	Democratic
Key: P Participant A Absent N Not invited I Invited W Withdrawn							
Key: P Participant A Absent N Not invited I Invited W Withdrawn					Lee Ann Dugas	Jim Francis	Tammy Savoie
1	Jul. 26, 2018	Louisiana Democratic Party	Lamar White Jr.	YouTube (Note: 1st district debate starts at 1:27, 6th district at 1:41:40.)	P	P	P

==== Results ====
Louisiana's 1st congressional district, 2018
Party	Candidate	Votes	%
Republican	Steve Scalise (incumbent)	192,526	71.5
Democratic	Tammy Savoie	44,262	16.4
Democratic	Lee Ann Dugas	18,552	6.9
Democratic	Jim Francis	8,685	3.2
Libertarian	Howard Kearney	2,806	1.0
Independent	Frederick "Ferd" Jones	2,442	0.9
Total votes		269,325	100.0
Republican hold			

== District 2 ==
2018 Louisiana's 2nd congressional district election
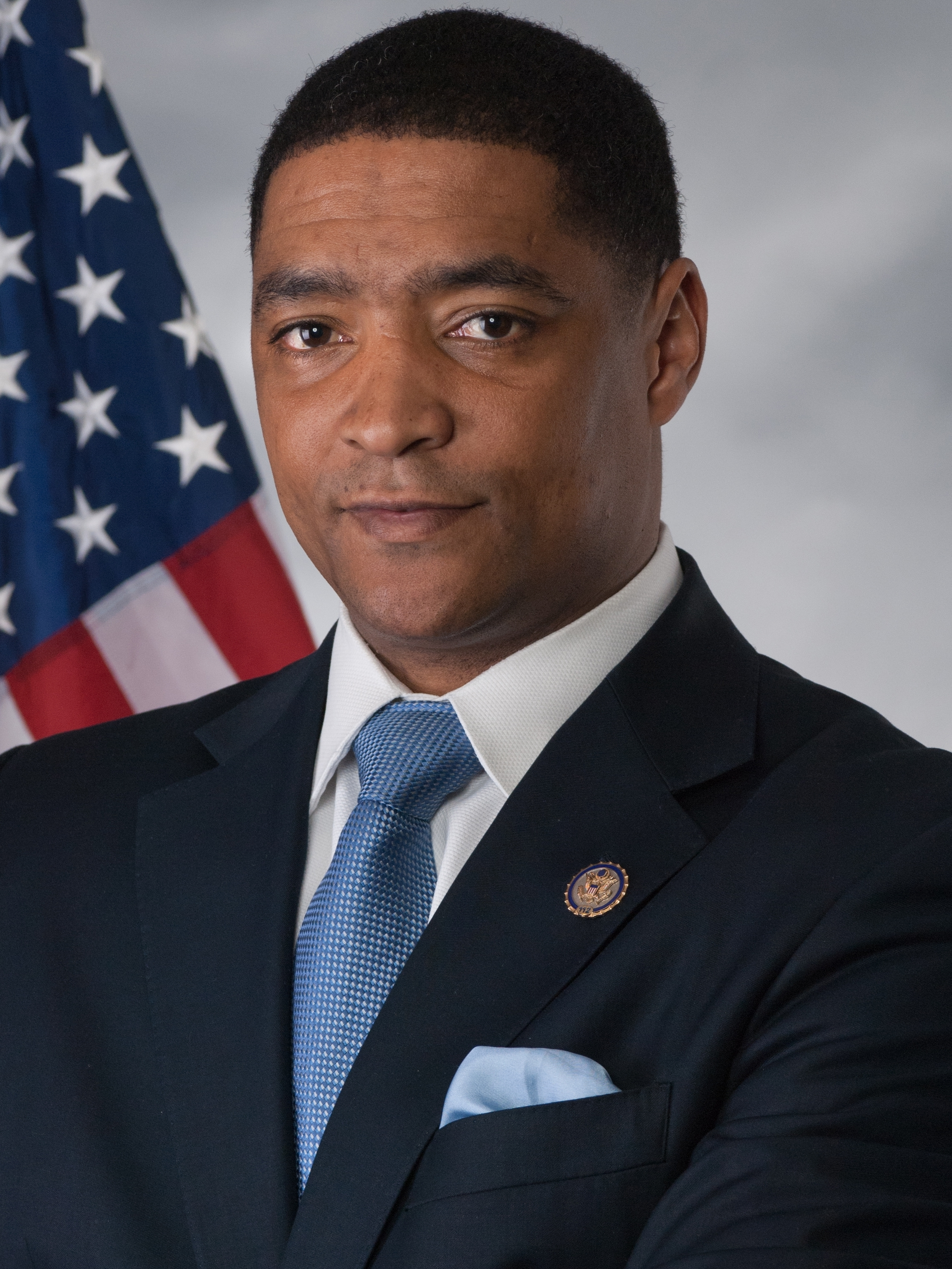

Candidate	Cedric Richmond	Jesse Schmidt	Belden "Noonie Man" Batiste
Party	Democratic	Independent	Independent
Popular vote	190,182	20,465	17,260
Percentage	80.6%	8.7%	7.3%
- Parish results Richmond: 50–60% 60–70% 70–80% 80–90% >90%
U.S. Representative before election
Cedric Richmond
Democratic
Elected U.S. Representative
Cedric Richmond
Democratic

The 2nd district stretches from New Orleans westward towards Baton Rouge and the surrounding areas. This is a heavily Democratic district, and had a PVI of D+25. Incumbent Democrat Cedric Richmond had represented this district since 2011 and won reelection in 2016 with 70%.

=== General election ===
==== Predictions ====
Source	Ranking	As of
The Cook Political Report	Safe D	November 5, 2018
Inside Elections	Safe D	November 5, 2018
Sabato's Crystal Ball	Safe D	November 5, 2018
RCP	Safe D	November 5, 2018
Daily Kos	Safe D	November 5, 2018
538	Safe D	November 7, 2018
CNN	Safe D	October 31, 2018
Politico	Safe D	November 4, 2018

==== Results ====
Louisiana's 2nd congressional district, 2018
Party	Candidate	Votes	%
Democratic	Cedric Richmond (incumbent)	190,182	80.6
Independent	Jesse Schmidt	20,465	8.7
Independent	Belden "Noonie Man" Batiste	17,260	7.3
Independent	Shawndra Rodriguez	8,075	3.4
Total votes		235,982	100.0
Democratic hold			

== District 3 ==
2018 Louisiana's 3rd congressional district election
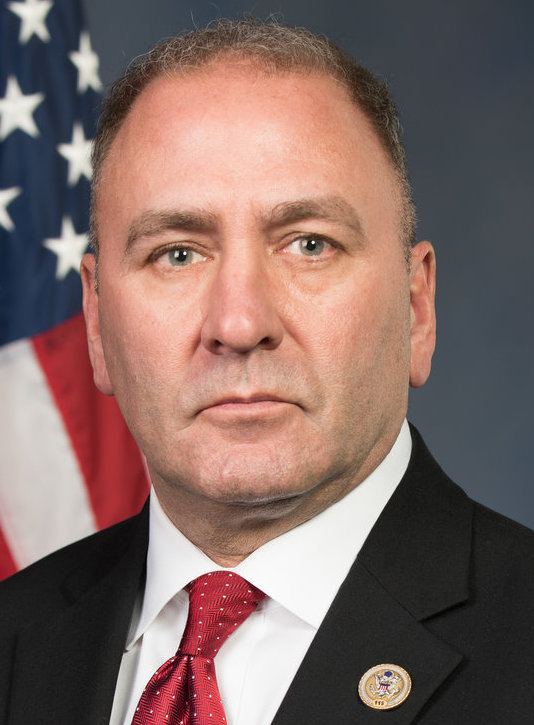

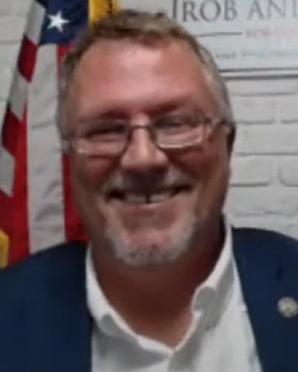
Candidate	Clay Higgins	Mimi Methvin
Party	Republican	Democratic
Popular vote	136,876	43,729
Percentage	55.7%	17.8%
Candidate	Josh Guillory	Rob Anderson
Party	Republican	Democratic
Popular vote	31,387	13,477
Percentage	12.8%	5.5%
- Parish results Higgins: 40–50% 50–60% 60–70% 70–80%
U.S. Representative before election
Clay Higgins
Republican
Elected U.S. Representative
Clay Higgins
Republican

The 3rd district is located within the Acadiana region and includes Lafayette, Lake Charles, and New Iberia. Incumbent Republican Clay Higgins was initially elected in 2016 with 56% of the vote. This is a reliably Republican district, and had a PVI of R+20.

=== General election ===
==== Predictions ====
Source	Ranking	As of
The Cook Political Report	Safe R	November 5, 2018
Inside Elections	Safe R	November 5, 2018
Sabato's Crystal Ball	Safe R	November 5, 2018
RCP	Safe R	November 5, 2018
Daily Kos	Safe R	November 5, 2018
538	Safe R	November 7, 2018
CNN	Safe R	October 31, 2018
Politico	Safe R	November 4, 2018

==== Results ====
Louisiana's 3rd congressional district, 2018
Party	Candidate	Votes	%
Republican	Clay Higgins (incumbent)	136,876	55.7
Democratic	Mimi Methvin	43,729	17.8
Republican	Josh Guillory	31,387	12.8
Democratic	Rob Anderson	13,477	5.5
Democratic	Larry Rader	9,692	3.9
Democratic	Verone Thomas	7,815	3.2
Libertarian	Aaron Andrus	2,967	1.2
Total votes		245,943	100.0
Republican hold			

== District 4 ==
2018 Louisiana's 4th congressional district election
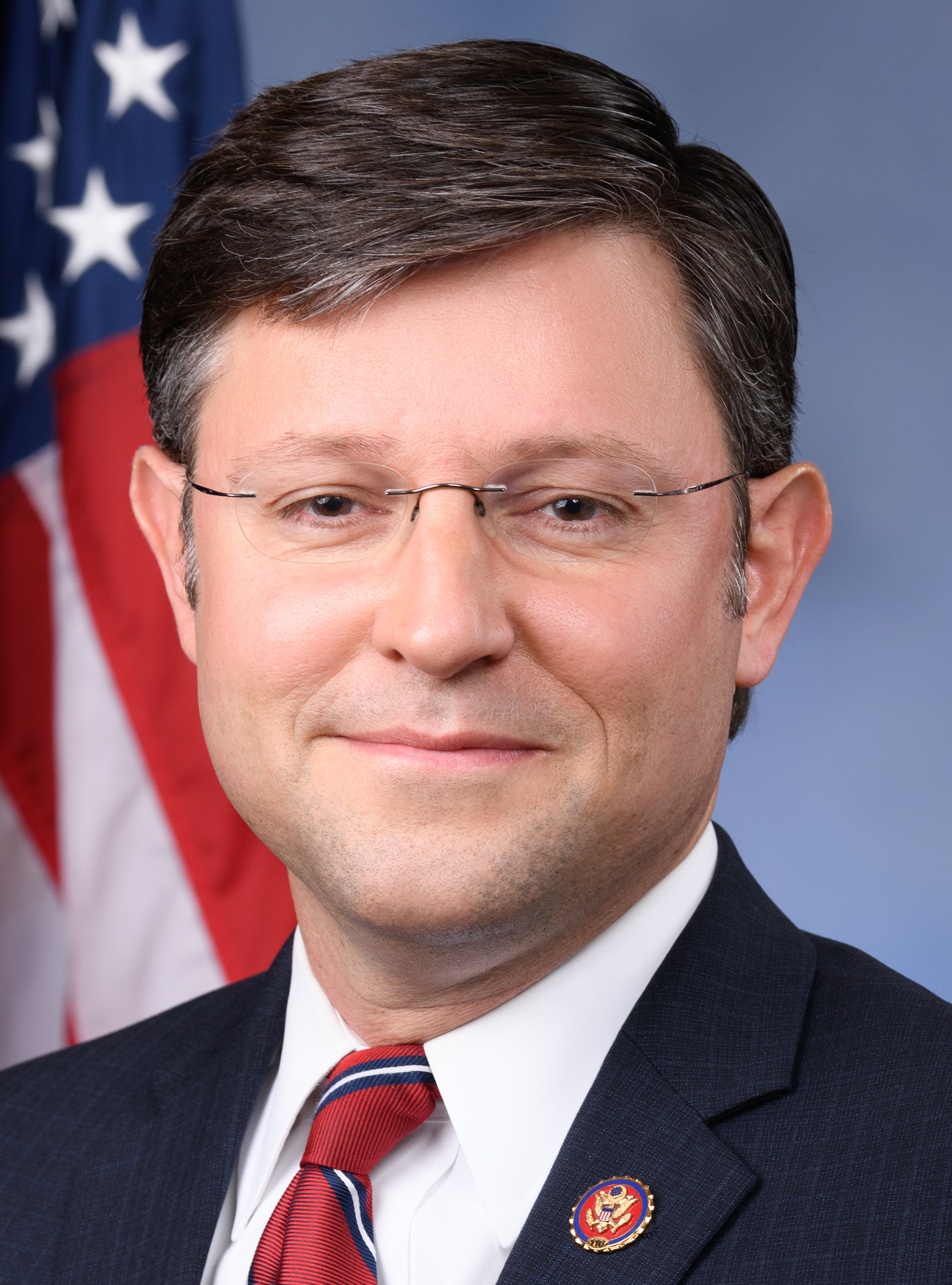

Candidate	Mike Johnson	Ryan Trundle
Party	Republican	Democratic
Popular vote	139,326	72,934
Percentage	64.2%	33.6%
- Parish results Johnson: 50–60% 60–70% 70–80% 80–90%
U.S. Representative before election
Mike Johnson
Republican
Elected U.S. Representative
Mike Johnson
Republican

The 4th district is located in Northwest Louisiana, taking in the Ark-La-Tex region, including Minden and Shreveport. This is a heavily Republican district, and had a PVI of R+13. Incumbent Republican Mike Johnson was initially elected in 2016 with 65% of the vote.

=== General election ===
==== Predictions ====
Source	Ranking	As of
The Cook Political Report	Safe R	November 5, 2018
Inside Elections	Safe R	November 5, 2018
Sabato's Crystal Ball	Safe R	November 5, 2018
RCP	Safe R	November 5, 2018
Daily Kos	Safe R	November 5, 2018
538	Safe R	November 7, 2018
CNN	Safe R	October 31, 2018
Politico	Safe R	November 4, 2018

==== Results ====
Louisiana's 4th congressional district, 2018
Party	Candidate	Votes	%
Republican	Mike Johnson (incumbent)	139,326	64.2
Democratic	Ryan Trundle	72,934	33.6
Independent	Mark David Halverson	4,612	2.1
Total votes		216,872	100.0
Republican hold			

== District 5 ==
2018 Louisiana's 5th congressional district election
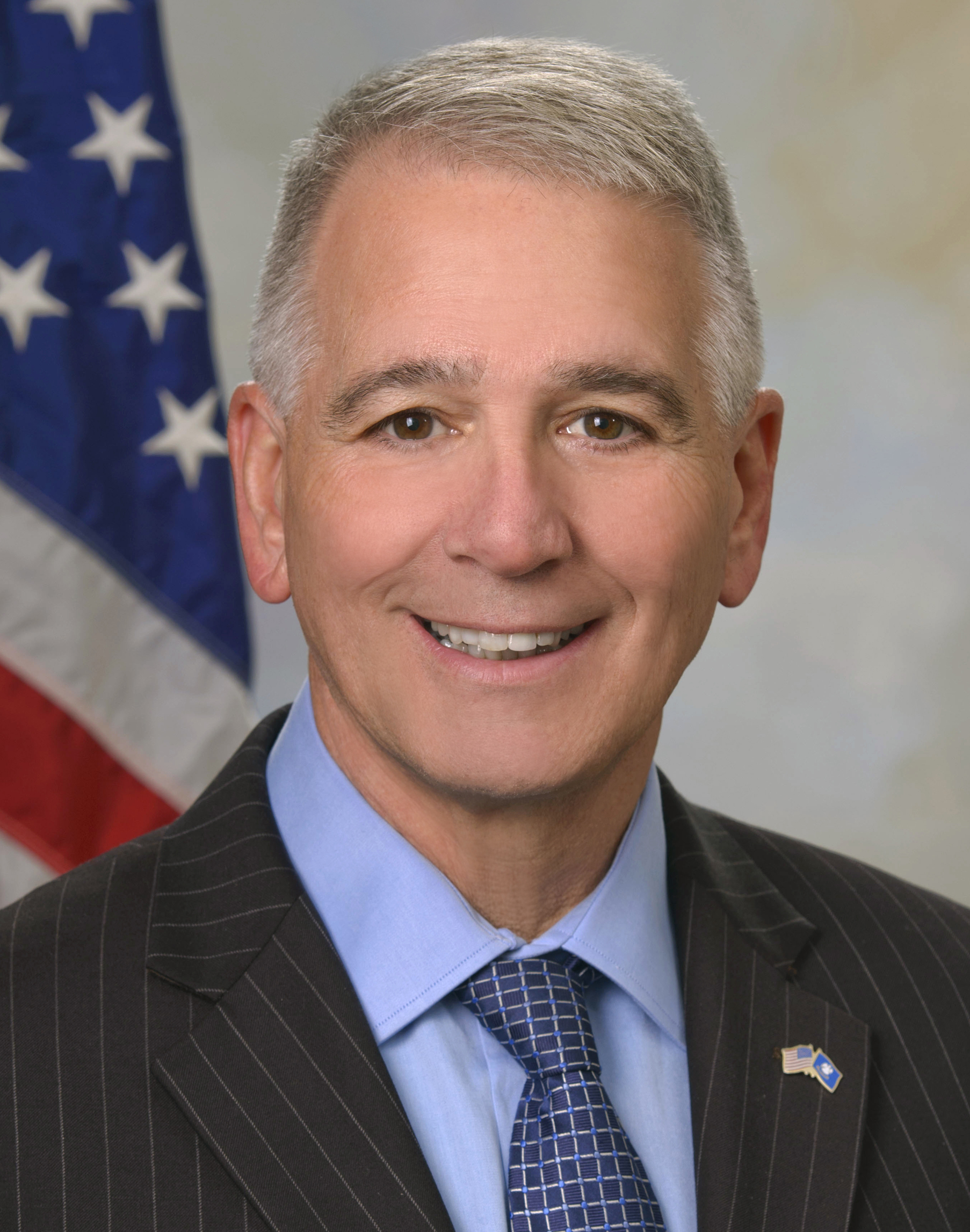

Candidate	Ralph Abraham	Jessee Carlton Fleenor
Party	Republican	Democratic
Popular vote	149,018	67,118
Percentage	66.5%	30.0%
- Parish results Abraham: 40–50% 50–60% 60–70% 70–80% 80–90%
U.S. Representative before election
Ralph Abraham
Republican
Elected U.S. Representative
Ralph Abraham
Republican

The 5th district is located in the northern Louisiana region, including the Monroe metro area. The district continues to stretch down into Central Louisiana taking in Alexandria and then expanding eastward into the Florida Parishes. This is a moderate to solid Republican district, and had a PVI of R+15. Incumbent Republican Ralph Abraham was initially elected in 2014, and was reelected in 2016 with 81% of the vote.

=== General election ===
==== Predictions ====
Source	Ranking	As of
The Cook Political Report	Safe R	November 5, 2018
Inside Elections	Safe R	November 5, 2018
Sabato's Crystal Ball	Safe R	November 5, 2018
RCP	Safe R	November 5, 2018
Daily Kos	Safe R	November 5, 2018
538	Safe R	November 7, 2018
CNN	Safe R	October 31, 2018
Politico	Safe R	November 4, 2018

==== Results ====
Louisiana's 5th congressional district, 2018
Party	Candidate	Votes	%
Republican	Ralph Abraham (incumbent)	149,018	66.5
Democratic	Jessee Carlton Fleenor	67,118	30.0
Independent	Billy Burkette	4,799	2.1
Libertarian	Kyle Randol	3,011	1.3
Total votes		223,946	100.0
Republican hold			

== District 6 ==
2018 Louisiana's 6th congressional district election
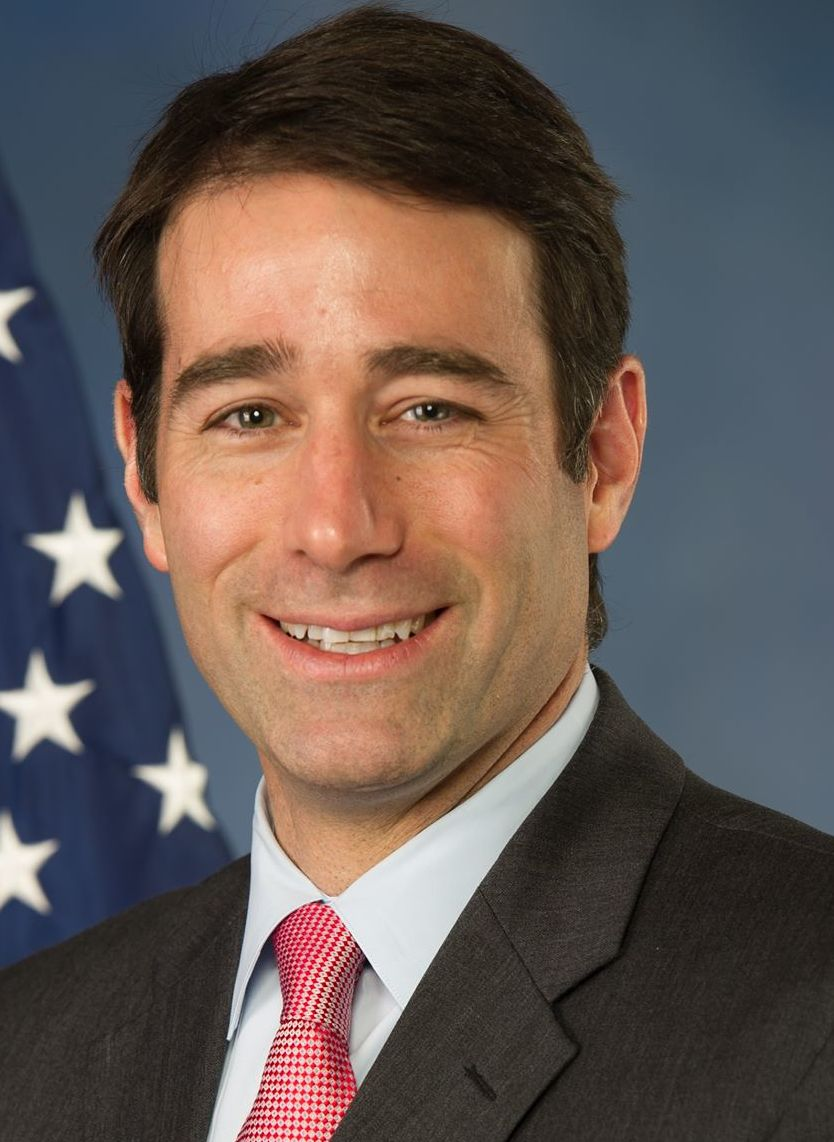

Candidate	Garret Graves	Justin DeWitt	Andie Saizan
Party	Republican	Democratic	Democratic
Popular vote	186,553	55,089	21,627
Percentage	69.5%	20.5%	8.1%
- Parish results Graves: 40–50% 50–60% 60–70% 70–80% 80–90%
U.S. Representative before election
Garret Graves
Republican
Elected U.S. Representative
Garret Graves
Republican

The 6th district is located within the Baton Rouge metropolitan area, including Central City, Denham Springs, and parts of the state capital, Baton Rouge. The district also stretches down into Acadiana taking in Thibodaux and parts of Houma. This is a strong Republican district, and had a PVI of R+19. Republican Garret Graves had represented this district since 2015 and was reelected in 2016 with 63% of the vote.

=== General election ===
==== Predictions ====
Source	Ranking	As of
The Cook Political Report	Safe R	November 5, 2018
Inside Elections	Safe R	November 5, 2018
Sabato's Crystal Ball	Safe R	November 5, 2018
RCP	Safe R	November 5, 2018
Daily Kos	Safe R	November 5, 2018
538	Safe R	November 7, 2018
CNN	Safe R	October 31, 2018
Politico	Safe R	November 4, 2018

=== Debate ===
2018 Louisiana's 6th congressional district democratic candidates debate
No.	Date	Host	Moderator	Link	Democratic	Democratic
Key: P Participant A Absent N Not invited I Invited W Withdrawn						
Key: P Participant A Absent N Not invited I Invited W Withdrawn					Justin DeWitt	Andie Saizan
1	Jul. 26, 2018	Louisiana Democratic Party	Lamar White Jr.	YouTube	P	P

==== Results ====
Louisiana's 6th congressional district, 2018
Party	Candidate	Votes	%
Republican	Garret Graves (incumbent)	186,553	69.5
Democratic	Justin DeWitt	55,089	20.5
Democratic	Andie Saizan	21,627	8.1
Independent	Devin Graham	5,256	2.0
Total votes		268,525	100.0
Republican hold			
