= Charles A. Henry =

American politician

Charles Henry

Member of the Louisiana House of Representatives from the 82nd district
- In office January 13, 2020 – January 12, 2021
- Preceded by: Cameron Henry
- Succeeded by: Laurie Schlegel

Personal details
- Born: Charles Alexander Henry
- Party: Republican
- Relatives: Cameron Henry (brother)
- Education: Loyola University New Orleans (BA, JD)

Charles Alexander Henry is an American politician who briefly served as a member of the Louisiana House of Representatives. A former chief of staff to Congressman Steve Scalise, he ran successfully for the state house in 2019 to succeed his brother, Cameron, who was term limited.
