= Senator Morrell =

Senator Morrell may refer to:

- Jean-Paul Morrell (born 1978), Louisiana State Senate
- Mike Morrell (born 1952), California State Senate

== See also ==
- Senator Morrill (disambiguation)
