= Louisiana's 3rd State Senate district =

American legislative district

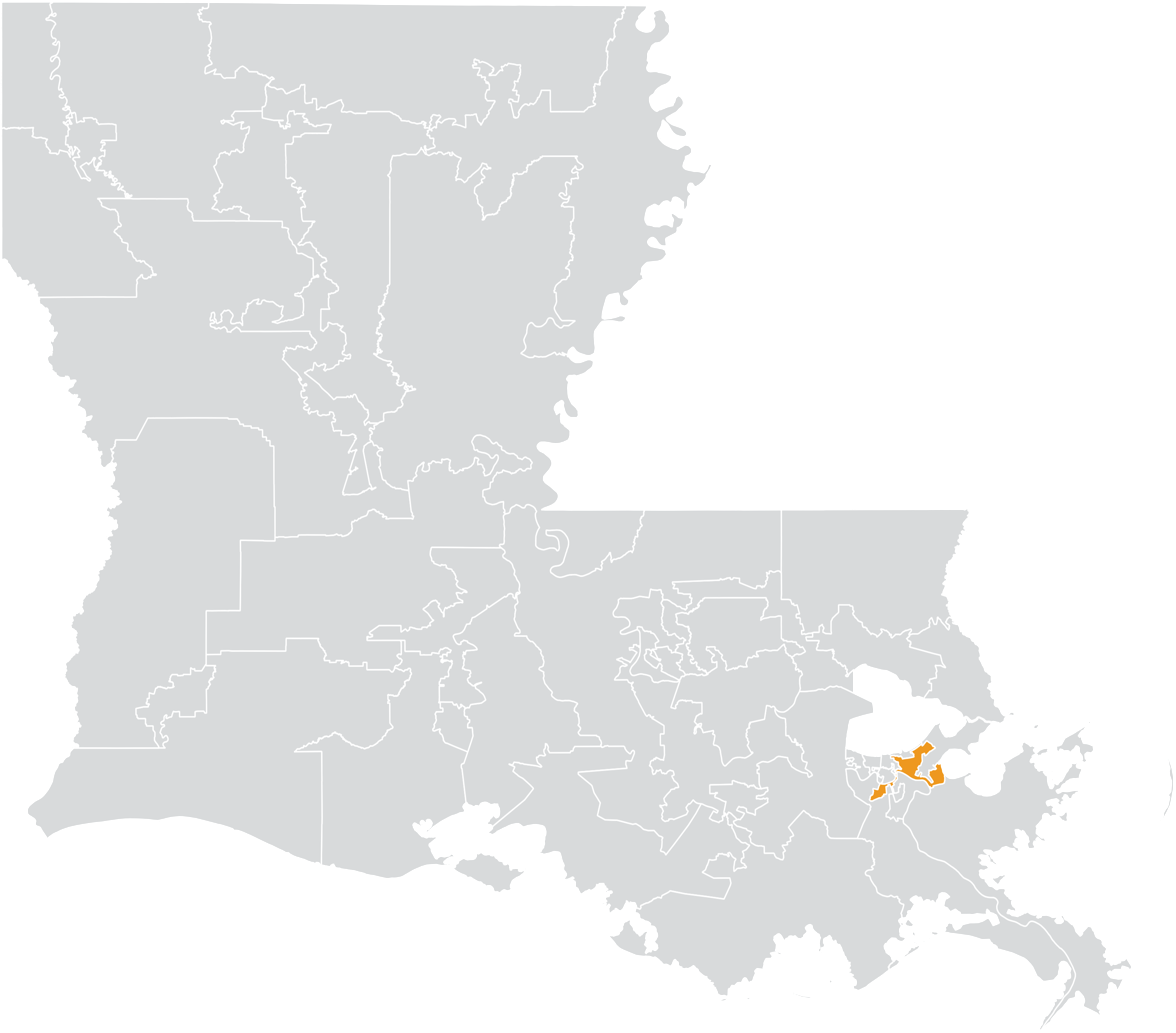
Senator
Joseph Bouie Jr. D–New Orleans
- Registration: 63.4% Democratic; 10.2% Republican; 26.4% No party preference
- Demographics: 27% White; 59% Black; 5% Hispanic; 6% Asian; 2% Other
- Population (2019): 128,190
- Registered voters: 80,102

Louisiana's 3rd State Senate district is one of 39 districts in the Louisiana State Senate. It has been represented by Democrat Joseph Bouie Jr. since 2020, succeeding fellow Democrat Jean-Paul Morrell.

== Geography ==
District 3 covers some of eastern New Orleans (primarily Gentilly, West Lake Forest, and the Lower Ninth Ward), as well as smaller parts of St. Bernard and Jefferson Parishes, including some or all of Chalmette, Arabi, Harvey, and Marrero.

The district overlaps with Louisiana's 1st and 2nd congressional districts, and with the 83rd, 84th, 85th, 87th, 93rd, 97th, 99th, 100th, 102nd, and 103rd districts of the Louisiana House of Representatives.

== Recent election results ==
Louisiana uses a jungle primary system. If no candidate receives 50% in the first round of voting, when all candidates appear on the same ballot regardless of party, the top-two finishers advance to a runoff election.

=== 2026 special election ===
Sidney Barthelemy II elected.

=== 2019 ===
2019 Louisiana State Senate election, District 3
Primary election
Party	Candidate	Votes	%
Democratic	Joseph Bouie Jr.	12,639	44.3
Democratic	John Bagneris	8,295	29.1
Republican	Kathleen Doody	5,287	18.5
Democratic	Brandon Gregoire	2,286	8.0
Total votes		28,507	100
General election
Democratic	Joseph Bouie Jr.	20,734	59.6
Democratic	John Bagneris	14,027	40.4
Total votes		34,761	100
Democratic hold			

=== 2015 ===
2015 Louisiana State Senate election, District 3
Party	Candidate	Votes	%
Democratic	Jean-Paul Morrell (incumbent)	Unopposed	100
Total votes		Unopposed	100
Democratic hold			

=== 2011 ===
Following redistricting, District 3 incumbent Jean-Paul Morrell was drawn into the same district as District 2 incumbent Cynthia Willard-Lewis.

2011 Louisiana State Senate election, District 3
Party	Candidate	Votes	%
Democratic	Jean-Paul Morrell (incumbent)	11,280	53.2
Democratic	Cynthia Willard-Lewis (incumbent)	9,911	46.8
Total votes		21,191	100
Democratic hold			

=== Federal and statewide results ===
Year	Office	Results
2020	President	Biden 74.7–23.6%
2019	Governor (runoff)	Edwards 85.6–14.4%
2016	President	Clinton 73.5–23.1%
2015	Governor (runoff)	Edwards 82.6–17.4%
2014	Senate (runoff)	Landrieu 82.2–17.8%
2012	President	Obama 76.6–21.9%
