= Louisiana's 97th House of Representatives district =

American legislative district

Louisiana's 97th State House of Representatives district
Representative
Vacant

Louisiana's 97th House of Representatives district is one of 105 Louisiana House of Representatives districts. It is currently vacant.

== Geography ==
HD97 is located entirely inside of the city of New Orleans.

== Election results ==
Year	Winning candidate	Party	Percent	Opponent	Party	Percent
2011	Jared Brossett	Democratic	Cancelled			
2014 (Special)	Joseph Bouie	Democratic	Cancelled			
2015	Joseph Bouie	Democratic	88%	MissKeith Prevost	Democratic	12%
2019	Matthew Willard	Democratic	51%	Eugene Green II	Democratic	49%
2023	Matthew Willard	Democratic	Cancelled			
2026 (Special)	Ed Murray	Democratic	52.3%	Eugene Green III	Democratic	47.7%
