= Joanne Lyles White =

American teacher and philanthropist

Lillian Joanne Lyles White
- Born: September 12, 1929; Rapides Parish, Louisiana, USA
- Died: March 9, 2011 (aged 81); Alexandria, Rapides Parish, Louisiana
- Education: Louisiana State University
- Occupations: Philanthropist; Teacher, Humanitarian
- Spouse(s): Paul Donald White, Sr (married 1951)
- Children: Paul Donald White, Jr. Charles Nathan White; Frederick Lamar White, Sr. (deceased); Paula Elizabeth White Hayes; Martha Anne White Johnston Wallace Mark White (deceased)
- Parent(s): Samuel Pickles Lyles and Marie Myrtle Guy Lyles

Lillian Joanne Lyles White (September 12, 1929 – March 9, 2011), known as Joanne White, was an American philanthropist, teacher, humanitarian, and social entrepreneur from Alexandria in Rapides Parish, who founded and co-founded several non-profit organizations and service agencies in Central Louisiana, including Angel Care, the Hope House, the Shepherd Center, Rapides Parish Habitat for Humanity, the Central Louisiana Food Bank, Care and Share, and Christmas Cheer for Children. Mrs. White was a founding member and first President of the Louisiana High School Speech League and the Tournament of Champions. Mrs. White also helped to create the Kuumba Center, the Wally White Lecture Series, and Aiken Option School. In 2011, following her death, White was specifically commended as one of "Louisiana's finest daughters" by the Louisiana House of Representatives.

== Early years ==
White was born in Cheneyville in Rapides Parish, the eighth of twelve children born to Samuel Pickles Lyles and the former Marie Myrtle Guy. She graduated from Lecompte High School in nearby Lecompte. Mrs. White's eldest sister, Sue Eakin, was a well-known Louisiana historian, and her grandson, Lamar White, is an investigative journalist and disability rights advocate.

In 1950, White graduated from LSU with a Bachelors in Science in Speech and Social Studies. While at LSU, White was a founding member of the Delta Gamma sorority. In 1999, White earned a certificate from the Harvard School of Divinity's Summer Leadership Program.

In 1951, Joanne Lyles married Paul Donald White. Together, they had six children.

== Philanthropy and Service ==
White was first inspired to service as a young girl, after reading Pearl Buck's accounts of peasant life in rural China. She began her career as a teacher at Bolton High School, and she taught history and coached debate from 1950 until her retirement in 1963.

In the 1980s, White helped to establish the Hope House, a shelter for battered women and their children; the Shepherd Center, an ecumenical ministry for the poor and dispossessed; and Angel Care, a charity that provided services and resources to the parents of disabled children. In the early 1990s, President George H. W. Bush named the Hope House as one of his 1,000 Points of Light.

In the late 1990s and early 2000s, White worked with the Louisiana Governors Office to investigate discrepancies between the treatment of incarcerated women and juveniles. When she was in her late 70s, White was chair of the Rapides Parish Workforce Investment Board.

White was the recipient of the Habitat for Humanity's Founders Award, the National Association of Social Worker's Public Citizen of the Year Award, the Lions Club's Outstanding Citizen Award, the Louisiana Methodist Church's Children and Families Service Award, the Young Women's Christian Association's Outstanding Community Leader Award, the Zeta Phi Beta's Outstanding Community Leadership Award, the Central Louisiana Professional Women's Network's Visionary Award, and Cenla Focus's Cenla-ian of the Year.

== Death ==
White died at the age of eighty-one at her home in Alexandria.
