= Matthew Willard =

American politician

Member of the New Orleans City Council from the at-large district Position 1
- Incumbent
- Assumed office January 12, 2026
- Preceded by: Helena Moreno

Minority Leader of the Louisiana House of Representatives
- In office January 8, 2024 – October 29, 2025
- Preceded by: Sam Jenkins
- Succeeded by: Kyle Green

Member of the Louisiana House of Representatives from the 97th district
- In office January 13, 2020 – January 12, 2026
- Preceded by: Joseph Bouie
- Succeeded by: Ed Murray

Personal details
- Born: November 5, 1988 (age 37) New Orleans, Louisiana, U.S.
- Party: Democratic
- Education: Louisiana State University (attended); University of New Orleans (BS)

Matthew Willard (born November 5, 1988) is an American politician serving as a member of the New Orleans City Council since January 12, 2026. He previously served as a member of the Louisiana House of Representatives from the 97th district.

== Early life and education ==
Willard was born and raised in New Orleans. He earned a Bachelor of Science degree in marketing from the University of New Orleans.

== Career ==
From 2012 to 2016, Willard worked as an account executive at Schulkens Communications. He then joined Fluence Analytics, working as a growth specialist and later senior manager for marketing and communications. He was elected to the Louisiana House of Representatives in November 2019 and assumed office on January 13, 2020.

In December 2023 Willard was elected as leader of the House Democratic caucus.

Willard resigned from the Louisiana House in January 2026 after being elected to the New Orleans City Council.

== Personal life ==
Willard is Catholic.

Louisiana House of Representatives
Preceded by Sam Jenkins	Minority Leader of the Louisiana House of Representatives; 2024–2025	Succeeded by Kyle Green
