= Joseph Bouie =

American politician

Joseph Bouie Jr.

6th & 10th Chancellor of Southern University at New Orleans
- Incumbent
- Assumed office August 1, 2025
- Preceded by: James H. Ammons
- In office April 1, 2000 – 2002
- Succeeded by: Victor Ukpolo

Member of the Louisiana State Senate from the 3rd district
- In office January 13, 2020 – October 15, 2025
- Preceded by: Jean-Paul Morrell
- Succeeded by: Sidney Barthelemy II

Member of the Louisiana House of Representatives from the 97th district
- In office January 2014 – January 13, 2020
- Preceded by: Jared Brossett
- Succeeded by: Matthew Willard

Personal details
- Born: December 1946 (age 79)
- Party: Democratic
- Spouse: Leslie P. Bouie
- Children: 5
- Education: Southern University (B.A.) ,Tulane (MSW); Clark-Atlanta U (Ph. D.)
- Occupation: Retired Professor / Administrator

Joseph Bouie Jr is an American politician from New Orleans, Louisiana who was the chairman of the Louisiana Black Caucus in 2018. A Democrat, Bouie represented District 3 in the Louisiana State Senate from 2020 to 2025; previously representing District 97 in the Louisiana House of Representatives between 2014 and 2020. On July 18, 2025, Bouie was re-named Chancellor of Southern University at New Orleans.

== Career ==
Before entering elected office, Bouie was a retired Social Work Professor and former Chancellor of Southern University at New Orleans. He was removed from the position after a 9–2 vote of the Southern University Board of Supervisors. Bouie was the default winner in the November 14, 2014, special election after opponent Eugene Green withdrew from contention. Bouie ran unsuccessfully for New Orleans City Council twice, in 2014 and 2017.

In 2019, Bouie advanced to the runoff for District 3 in the Louisiana State Senate, which was vacated by Jean-Paul Morrell due to term limits. Bouie won the runoff with 60% of the votes, over John Bagneris.

In 2023, Joseph Bouie Jr. was re-elected to his position as a member of the Louisiana State Senate, representing District 3. He ran unopposed, securing another term in office.

== Election History ==
2023 Louisiana State Senate District 3 election
Primary election
| Party | Candidate | Votes | % |
|---|---|---|---|
| Democratic | Joseph Bouie (incumbent) | Unopposed | |
| Total votes | | —N/a | 100.0 |

2019 Louisiana State Senate District 3 election
| Candidate | Party | First round | | Second round | |
| Candidate | Party | Votes | % | Votes | % |
|---|---|---|---|---|---|
| John H. Bagneris | Democratic | 8,295 | 29.10 | 14,027 | 40.35 |
| Joseph Bouie | Democratic | 12,639 | 44.33 | 20,734 | 59.65 |
| Kathleen Doody | Republican | 5,287 | 18.55 | | |
| Brandon Gregoire | Democratic | 2,287 | 8.02 | | |
| Total | | 28,508 | 100.00 | 34,761 | 100.00 |

Louisiana State Senate
| Preceded by Jean-Paul Morrell | Member of the Louisiana Senate from the 3rd district 2020-2025 | Succeeded by Sidney Barthelemy II |
Louisiana House of Representatives
| Preceded by Elbert Guillory | Member of the Louisiana House of Representatives from the 97th district 2014-2020 | Succeeded by Matthew Willard |
