= Senator Morrill =

Senator Morrill may refer to:

== Members of the United States Senate ==
- Justin Smith Morrill (1810–1898), U.S. Senator from Vermont from 1867 to 1898
- Lot M. Morrill (1813–1883), U.S. Senator from Maine from 1869 to 1876

== United States state senate members ==
- Edmund Needham Morrill (1834–1909), Kansas State Senate

== See also ==
- David L. Morril (1772–1849), U.S. Senator from New Hampshire from 1817 to 1823
- Senator Morrell (disambiguation)
