= Louisiana's 87th House of Representatives district =

American legislative district

Louisiana's 87th State House of Representatives district
Representative
Rodney Lyons; D–Harvey

Louisiana's 87th House of Representatives district is one of 105 Louisiana House of Representatives districts. It is currently represented by Democrat Rodney Lyons.

== Geography ==
HD87 is located in Jefferson Parish and includes portions of the West Bank suburbs of the New Orleans metropolitan area, such as Gretna, Harvey, Marrero, and Woodmere.

== Election results ==
Year	Winning candidate	Party	Percent	Opponent	Party	Percent
2003	Derrick Shepherd	Democratic	60.20%	Donald Ray Jones	Democratic	39.80%
2005 (special)	Terrell Harris	Democratic	66.72%	Donald R. Jones	Democratic	29.07%
2011	Girod Jackson III	Democratic	100%			
2013	Ebony Woodruff	Democratic	100%			
2015	Rodney Lyons Sr.	Democratic	58.63%	Ebony Woodruff	Democratic	41.37%
2019	Rodney Lyons Sr.	Democratic	79.04%	John Neal	Democratic	20.96%
2023	Rodney Lyons Sr.	Democratic	70.30%	Trent Mackey Jr.	Democratic	29.70%
