= Jared Brossett =

American politician (born 1982)

Jared Christopher Brossett

New Orleans City Councilman for District D
- In office 2014–2022
- Preceded by: Cynthia Hedge-Morrell
- Succeeded by: Eugene J. Green

Louisiana State Representative for District 97 (Orleans Parish)
- In office 2009–2014
- Preceded by: Jean-Paul Morrell
- Succeeded by: Joseph Bouie, Jr.

Personal details
- Born: 1982 (age 43–44) New Orleans, Louisiana, USA
- Party: Democratic
- Parent(s): Elery Michael and Brenda M. Brossett
- Education: Xavier University of Louisiana

Jared Christopher Brossett (born October 1982) is an American politician who served on the New Orleans City Council from 2014 to 2022, representing District D. He previously served in the Louisiana House of Representatives from 2009 to 2014, representing Orleans Parish.

== Biography ==
Brossett is the son of Brenda M. Brossett and Elery Michael Brossett. He graduated from McDonogh 35 Senior High School in New Orleans and holds a bachelor's degree in political science from Xavier University of Louisiana. He is a member of the Orleans Parish Democratic Executive Committee.

=== Career ===
Brossett was formerly a member of the Louisiana House of Representatives, where he represented District 97 in New Orleans, Louisiana. He was first elected in May 2009 during a special election. During his years in the legislature, he was Chairperson of the Select Committee on Hurricane Recovery, where he worked to uncover the corruption and mismanagement of the state-run Katrina Recovery programs. Brossett also served on the Appropriations; House and Governmental Affairs; Municipal, Parochial, and Cultural Affairs; and Homeland Security committees.

Following his election to the New Orleans City Council in 2014, Brossett was succeeded in the House by another Democrat, Joseph Bouie Jr., a retired professor and administrator at Southern University at New Orleans. Coincidentally, Bouie had run unsuccessfully against Brossett for the City Council just a few months earlier.

Brossett served as Chair of the New Orleans City Council's Budget, Audit and Board of Review Committee. He also served on the Transportation, Utilities, Government Affairs, Economic Development and Special Projects, and Community Development committees.

Council member Brossett is also a member of the Louisiana Super Region Rail Authority and was appointed by Governor John Bel Edwards to the Task Force on Transportation and Infrastructure Investment.

==== Drunk driving ====
On May 14, 2006, Brossett was arrested on charges of drunk driving in Miami Beach, Florida. At the time he was an aide to then-City Councilwoman Cynthia Hedge-Morrell. He later pled no contest to a charge of reckless driving.

On June 14, 2020, Brossett was again arrested under suspicion of a DWI in New Orleans after crashing a city-owned vehicle. On June 15, Brossett announced he would seek substance abuse treatment, but was seen back at work within a week. On August 10, Brossett entered a "not guilty" plea to the charges against him.

On October 18, 2021, amid a run for the city council's at-large seat, Brossett was arrested again for suspected DWI.

On May 23, 2026, Brossett was arrested once more for DWI.

== Notes ==
Louisiana House of Representatives
Preceded by Jean-Paul Morrell	Louisiana State Representative for District 97 (Orleans Parish); Jared Brossett; 2009 –2014	Succeeded by Joseph Bouie, Jr.
