= Ed Murray (Louisiana politician) =

American politician

Member of the Louisiana House of Representatives from the 97th district
- Incumbent
- Assumed office February 2026
- Preceded by: Matthew Willard

Personal details
- Party: Democratic

Ed Murray is an American politician from Louisiana. He is a Democratic member of the Louisiana House of Representatives.

== Career ==
He ran in the 2026 special election for the 97th district in the Louisiana House of Representatives, which Matthew Willard had represented. He defeated Democratic candidate Eugene Green, in the general election.
