= Sidney Barthelemy II =

American politician

Member of the Louisiana Senate from the 3rd district
- Incumbent
- Assumed office March 24, 2026
- Preceded by: Joseph Bouie

Personal details
- Party: Democratic
- Parent: Sidney Barthelemy
- Website: www.sidneybarthelemy.com

Sidney Barthelemy II is an American politician who has been a member of the Louisiana State Senate for the 3rd district since a 2026 special election. He is the son of New Orleans mayor Sidney Barthelemy.
