= List of Acacia members =

Acacia Fraternity is a social fraternity founded in 1904 at the University of Michigan in Ann Arbor, Michigan. It was founded by undergraduate Freemasons and was originally open only to men who were Masons, but dispensed with the Masonic prerequisite in 1933. The following list includes notable initiated and honorary members of Acacia.

== Academia ==
- Stratton D. Brooks, Missouri 1925 - President of the University of Oklahoma (1912) and University of Missouri (1923)
- Walter Elmer Ekblaw, Illinois 1907 - college professor who served as geologist, ornithologist and botanist on the Crocker Land Expedition
- Raymond A. Pearson, Iowa State 1924 - President of Iowa State University
- Roscoe Pound, Nebraska 1905, Harvard 1913 - educator; Bushnell Hall at KSU dedicated in his name
- L. Dennis Smith, Indiana 1956 - President Emeritus, University of Nebraska
- Claude R. Sowle, Northwestern 1947 - past President of Ohio University
- Francis W. Shepardson - professor of history at the University of Chicago and director of the Illinois Department of Registration and Education
- Albert B. Storms, Iowa State 1909 - President of Iowa State University
- Ray T. Stull - professor and head of ceramic engineering at the University of Illinois; chief of the heavy clay section of the United States Bureau of Standards and chief ceramist of the United States Bureau of Mines
- Walter Williams, Missouri 1909 - President of University of Missouri; founder of Missouri School of Journalism

== Business ==
- Dennis Chookaszian, Northwestern 1962 - chairman and CEO of CNA Insurance Companies; professor at University of Chicago Booth School of Business
- David A. Evans, Rensselaer 1979 - inventor of high capacity tantalum capacitor; President of Evans Capacitor Company
- Frank S. Land, Missouri - founder of the Order of DeMolay
- Lewis H. Wentz, Oklahoma 1927 - oil businessman

== Entertainment ==
- Scott Houston, Indiana 1980 - public television personality; public speaker; known as "Piano Guy"
- Nic Pizzolatto, LSU - creator and writer of the TV series True Detective

== Literature ==
- Philip Bobbitt, Texas 1965 - author and constitutional theorist
- Arthur H. Carhart, Iowa State 1916 - early conservationist and writer
- Jack Collom, Colorado A&M 1952 - poet, writer, teacher
- Edward Everett Dale, Harvard 1917 - historian, writer
- Clifton Hillegass, Nebraska 1938 - creator of CliffsNotes

== Politics ==
- John Moore Allison, Nebraska 1927 - diplomat; Ambassador to Japan; Assistant Secretary of State under Truman
- Hiram Bingham III, Yale 1915 - US Senator, Governor of Connecticut, and explorer who discovered Machu Picchu
- William G. Bray, Indiana 1927 - US Congressman, Indiana
- William Jennings Bryan, Nebraska 1908 - Secretary of State under Woodrow Wilson; orator
- Homer E. Capehart, Indiana 1959 - US Senator, Indiana
- Arthur Capper, Kansas State 1916 - Governor and US Senator, Kansas
- Frank Carlson, Kansas State 1948 - US Congressman; US Senator; Governor of Kansas
- Wilburn Cartwright, Oklahoma 1920 - US Congressman, Oklahoma
- Francis H. Case, Northwestern 1923 - US Congressman, South Dakota
- Ovie Clark Fisher, Texas 1926 - US Congressman, Texas; writer
- J. Edward Hutchinson, Michigan 1933 - US Congressman, Michigan
- James 'Jim' Kolbe, Northwestern 1961 - US House Representative, Arizona
- Harry G. Leslie, Purdue 1907 - Governor of Indiana
- Paul V. McNutt, Harvard 1914 - Governor of Indiana
- Steve Scalise, LSU 1986 - Current US Congressman, Louisiana
- Conrad G. Selvig, Minnesota 1906 - US Congressman, Minnesota
- David Sholtz, Yale 1914 - Governor of Florida
- William Howard Taft, Yale 1913 - 27th President of the United States of America
- Homer Thornberry, Texas 1930 - US Congressman, Texas
- Jim Watson, Carleton University 1998 - Member of Provincial Parliament (Minister), Mayor of Ottawa, Ontario, Canada (1997–2000) (2010–2022)
- Ralph Yarborough, Texas 1926 - US Senator, Texas

== Science ==
- Lloyd Berkner, Minnesota 1926 - physicist
- Karl M. Dallenbach, Cornell 1913 - psychologist
- William F. Durand, Stanford 1904 - NASA pioneer
- Harold E. Edgerton, Nebraska 1924 - pioneer in the electronic flash, pertaining to photography
- Jack Kilby, Illinois 1942 - Nobel Prize laureate in physics; inventor of the integrated circuit
- George J. Marrett, Iowa State 1957 - test pilot for USAF and Hughes Aircraft Company; author of four non-fiction books on aviation
- Wallace E. Pratt, Kansas 1907- pioneer in the petroleum field
- Laurence H. Snyder, Oklahoma 1949 - pioneer in genetics
- James E. Webb, North Carolina 1927 - high-ranking NASA official in the 1960s
- Alexander Wetmore, Kansas 1912 - ornithologist

== Sports ==
- Dee Andros, Oklahoma 1948 - head football coach and athletic director, Oregon State
- Jack van Bebber, Oklahoma State 1931 - Olympic wrestler
- Chester L. Brewer, Missouri 1911 - past head football coach at both Missouri and Michigan State; past athletic director of Missouri; Homecoming originator
- Gene Conley, Washington State 1949 - professional baseball player and basketball player
- Ron Fairly, USC 1957 - professional baseball player and broadcaster
- Richard ‘Dick’ Farley, Indiana 1951 - star IU basketball player for the 1953 National Championship team; NBA player
- Calvin Griffith, George Washington 1935 - owner of Washington Senators / Minnesota Twins
- John L. Griffith, Illinois 1921 - past commissioner of what is now the Big Ten Conference
- Thomas "Tommy" James, Ohio State 1942 - professional football player, Cleveland Browns
- Pat Jones, Oklahoma State - Head Football Coach at Oklahoma State; Assistant Coach of Miami Dolphins
- Roger Nelson, Oklahoma 1951 - Canadian Football Hall of Fame
- Gary Patterson, Kansas State 1980 - current Head Football Coach at TCU
- David 'Wes' Santee, Kansas 1952 - Olympic runner
- H. L. 'Tom' Sebring, Kansas State 1920 - judge for the Nuremberg Trials; head football coach at the University of Florida
- Arthur L. Valpey, Michigan 1936 - head football coach of Harvard and UConn
- Edwin Weir, Nebraska 1925 - Hall of Fame college football player
