= Cynthia Hedge-Morrell =

American teacher and politician

Cynthia Hedge- Morrell

New Orleans City Council member for District D
- In office April 2005 – 2014
- Preceded by: David Payton (interim)
- Succeeded by: Jared Brossett

Personal details
- Born: September 4, 1947 (age 79)
- Party: Democratic
- Spouse: Arthur A. Morrell
- Children: Four sons, including: Jean-Paul Morrell
- Education: University of New Orleans; Loyola University New Orleans
- Occupation: Educational administrator

Cynthia Hedge-Morrell (born September 4, 1947) is a teacher, former school administrator, and Democratic politician from New Orleans, Louisiana. She served on the New Orleans City Council from 2005 to 2014.

== Education ==
Hedge-Morrell earned a bachelor's degree in Elementary Education from the University of New Orleans and a master's degree from Loyola University New Orleans.

== Political life ==
Hedge-Morrell won a special election to the New Orleans City Council on April 2, 2005, defeating Republican Eustis J. Guillemet Jr. with 84.5% of the vote.

Hedge-Morrell was re-elected in 2006 but with a reduced majority. A number of her colleagues faced voter dissatisfaction stemming from the aftermath of Hurricane Katrina. Mayor Ray Nagin won re-election only after facing a much tougher challenge than expected before the hurricane and half of the members who wished to stay were not returned to the city council.

In 2007, Hedge-Morrell was pulled over for speeding on Interstate 10. She later apologized for her remarks during the incident.

She appeared in the documentary political film directed by Leslie Carde America Betrayed (2008).

In 2014, term limits prevented Hedge-Morrell from seeking re-election in District D. She ran for the Division 2 at-large seat but lost to fellow Democrat Jason Williams by a two-to-one margin.

== Personal life ==
Since 1966, Hedge-Morrell has been married to Arthur A. Morrell, who served as a state representative for District 97 from 1984 to 2006, when he was elected as the Orleans Parish Clerk of Criminal Court. District 97 roughly covers the same area as District D. Hedge-Morrell and her husband were among the participants in movie director Spike Lee's documentary When The Levees Broke: A Requiem In Four Acts.

Morrell is Catholic.

== Election history ==
Councilmember, District D, 2005 Threshold > 50% First Ballot, April 2, 2005

Candidate	Affiliation	Support	Outcome
Cynthia Hedge-Morrell	Democratic	4,959 (84%)	Elected
Eustis A. Guillemet	Republican	912 (16%)	Defeated

Councilmember, District D, 2006 Threshold > 50% First Ballot, April 22, 2006

Candidate	Affiliation	Support	Outcome
Cynthia Hedge-Morrell	Democratic	10,889 (56%)	Elected
Louella Givens	Democratic	4,194 (22%)	Defeated
Others	n.a.	4,319 (22%)	Defeated

== Sources ==
- City of New Orleans website
- Louisiana Secretary of State website
- Hedge-Morrell's re-election website archived at Wayback Machine

Political offices
Preceded by David Payton (interim)	New Orleans City Council member for District D 2005–2014	Succeeded by Jared Brossett
