= Cameron Henry =

American politician

President of the Louisiana State Senate
- Incumbent
- Assumed office January 8, 2024
- Preceded by: Page Cortez

Member of the Louisiana State Senate from the 9th district
- Incumbent
- Assumed office January 13, 2020
- Preceded by: Conrad Appel

Member of the Louisiana House of Representatives from the 82nd district
- In office 2008–2020
- Preceded by: Steve Scalise
- Succeeded by: Charles Henry

Personal details
- Born: John Cameron Henry Jr.
- Party: Republican
- Relatives: Charles Henry (brother)
- Education: Louisiana State University (BS); Tulane University (MBA)

John Cameron Henry Jr. is an American politician serving as a member of the Louisiana State Senate from the 9th district. He assumed office on January 13, 2020. He previously represented the 82nd district of the Louisiana House of Representatives from 2008 to 2020.

== Education ==
Henry graduated from Jesuit High School in New Orleans. He earned a Bachelor of Science degree in political science from Louisiana State University and a Master of Business Administration in finance from the Freeman School of Business at Tulane University.

== Career ==
As a graduate student, Henry served as a legislative aide for Congressman Steve Scalise. He was elected to the Louisiana House of Representatives in 2007 and served until 2020, after which he was elected to the Louisiana State Senate. Henry authored a bill to legalize sports betting in Louisiana.

Political offices
Preceded by Page Cortez	President of the Louisiana Senate; 2024–present	Incumbent
