= America Betrayed =

- Directed by: Leslie Carde
- Produced by: Indira Chatterjee
- Edited by: Drew Kilcoin
- Distributed by: First Run Features
- Release date: September 4, 2008
- Running time: 95 min
- Country: United States

America Betrayed is a 2008 American documentary political film directed by Leslie Carde and featuring President Barack Obama, Senators John McCain and Mary Landrieu.

== Cast ==
- Professor Robert Bea
- George W. Bush
- Joey DiFatta
- Richard Dreyfuss
- Steve Ellis
- Lucille Franz
- Cynthia Hedge-Morrell
- Judy Hoffmeister
- J. Bennett Johnston
- Mary Landrieu
- John McCain
- Pamela Nevle
- Barack Obama
- Professor Paul Templett
- Pete Tufaro
