= Steve Scalise =

American politician (born 1965)

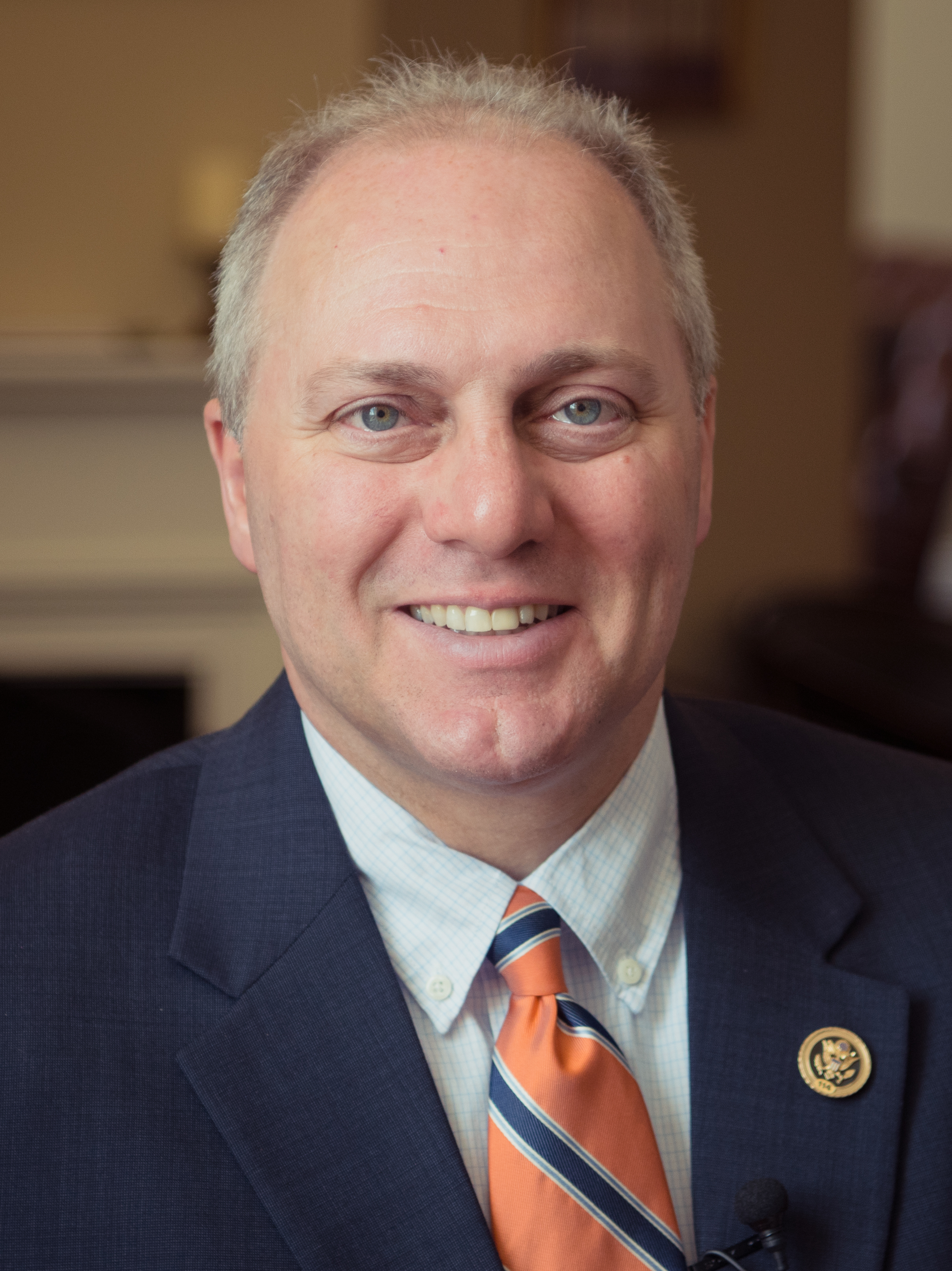
- Official portrait, 2019

House Majority Leader
- Incumbent
- Assumed office January 3, 2023
- Speaker: Kevin McCarthy; Mike Johnson
- Whip: Tom Emmer
- Preceded by: Steny Hoyer
House positions
House Minority Whip
In office January 3, 2019 – January 3, 2023
Leader	Kevin McCarthy
Preceded by	Steny Hoyer
Succeeded by	Katherine Clark
House Majority Whip
In office August 1, 2014 – January 3, 2019
Leader	John Boehner; Paul Ryan
Preceded by	Kevin McCarthy
Succeeded by	Jim Clyburn
Chair of the Republican Study Committee
In office January 3, 2013 – August 1, 2014
Preceded by	Jim Jordan
Succeeded by	Rob Woodall

Member of the U.S. House of Representatives from Louisiana's 1st district
- Incumbent
- Assumed office May 3, 2008 (Note: Scalise's official service begins on the date of the special election, while he was not sworn in until May 7, 2008.)
- Preceded by: Bobby Jindal

Member of the Louisiana Senate from the 9th district
- In office January 14, 2008 – May 6, 2008
- Preceded by: Ken Hollis
- Succeeded by: Conrad Appel

Member of the Louisiana House of Representatives from the 82nd district
- In office January 8, 1996 – January 14, 2008
- Preceded by: Quentin Dastugue
- Succeeded by: Cameron Henry

Personal details
- Born: Stephen Joseph Scalise; October 6, 1965 (age 61) New Orleans, Louisiana, U.S.
- Party: Republican
- Spouse: Jennifer Letulle (m. 2005)
- Children: 2
- Education: Louisiana State University (BS)
- Website: House website; Party website; Campaign website

Stephen Joseph Scalise (/skəˈliːs/ skə-LEESS; born October 6, 1965) is an American politician who has been the House majority leader since 2023 and the U.S. representative for Louisiana's 1st congressional district since 2008. A member of the Republican Party, he was the House majority whip from 2014 to 2019 and the House minority whip 2019 to 2023.

Before his election to Congress, Scalise served four months in the Louisiana State Senate and three terms in the Louisiana House of Representatives. He was the chair of the House Republican Study Committee from 2013 to 2014. On June 19, 2014, Scalise's Republican colleagues elected him majority whip of the United States House of Representatives. He assumed office on August 1. He is the first Louisianian to serve as majority whip since Hale Boggs of Louisiana's 2nd congressional district held the position from 1962 to 1971. In 2017, Scalise became the dean of the Louisiana congressional delegation upon Senator David Vitter's retirement. Scalise's district includes most of New Orleans's suburbs, such as Metairie, Kenner, and Slidell, as well as a portion of New Orleans itself.

On June 14, 2017, during practice for that year's Congressional Baseball Game, Scalise was shot and seriously wounded by an anti-Trump domestic terrorist who was targeting Republicans. Scalise underwent treatment for several months, returning to Congress on September 28.

On October 11, 2023, Scalise defeated Jim Jordan to win the Republican nomination for the October 2023 Speaker of the House election following the removal of Kevin McCarthy. However, he withdrew a day later after failing to consolidate the necessary votes.

On November 4, 2026, Scalise announced that he would run for House Minority Leader following House Speaker Mike Johnson's decision to step down as leader of the House Republican Conference. On November 10, Scalise was defeated by Jordan in a 106–73 vote.

== Early life and education ==
Scalise was born in New Orleans, one of three children of Alfred Joseph Scalise, a real estate broker who died on October 8, 2015, at the age of 77, and Carol Schilleci. His siblings are Glenn and Tara Scalise.

Scalise's great-grandparents immigrated to the United States from Italy in the late 1800s. He graduated from Archbishop Rummel High School in Metairie in Jefferson Parish and earned a Bachelor of Science degree from Louisiana State University (LSU) in Baton Rouge with a major in computer science and a minor in political science. At LSU, Scalise was a member of the Acacia Fraternity. He serves on the board of the American Italian Renaissance Foundation, servicing the American Italian Cultural Center.

== Louisiana Legislature ==
In 1995, Scalise was recruited by Louisiana Republicans to run for Republican (formerly Democratic) state representative Quentin Dastugue's District 82 seat in the Louisiana House of Representatives after Dastague made an unsuccessful bid for governor of Louisiana. Scalise won the seat and was re-elected in 1999 and 2003. He served until 2007.

On October 20, 2007, Scalise was elected in a nonpartisan blanket primary to the District 9 seat in the Louisiana Senate vacated by the term-limited Ken Hollis of Metairie. Scalise received 19,154 votes (61 percent) in a three-way contest. Fellow Republican Polly Thomas, an education professor at the University of New Orleans who subsequently won a special state House election in 2016, polled 8,948 votes (29 percent). A Democrat, David Gereighty, polled 3,154 votes (10 percent) in the heavily Republican-oriented district. Scalise, who was term-limited out of the House, was succeeded in the state House by his aide, Cameron Henry of Metairie.

In the special election on November 4, 2008, to fill the remaining three and one-half years in Scalise's state Senate term, Conrad Appel defeated Polly Thomas, 21,853 (52.1 percent) to 20,065 (47.9 percent). Thomas had also lost the race for the seat in 2007 to Scalise.

== U.S. House of Representatives ==
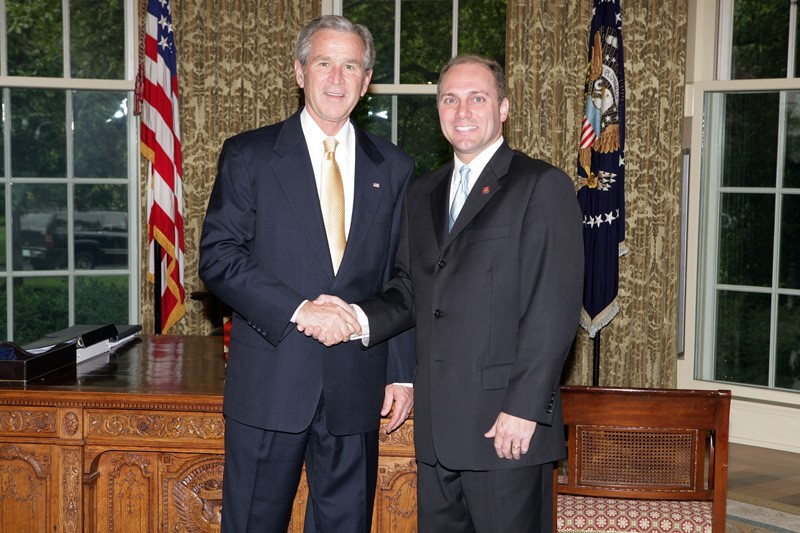
Scalise with President George W. Bush in 2008

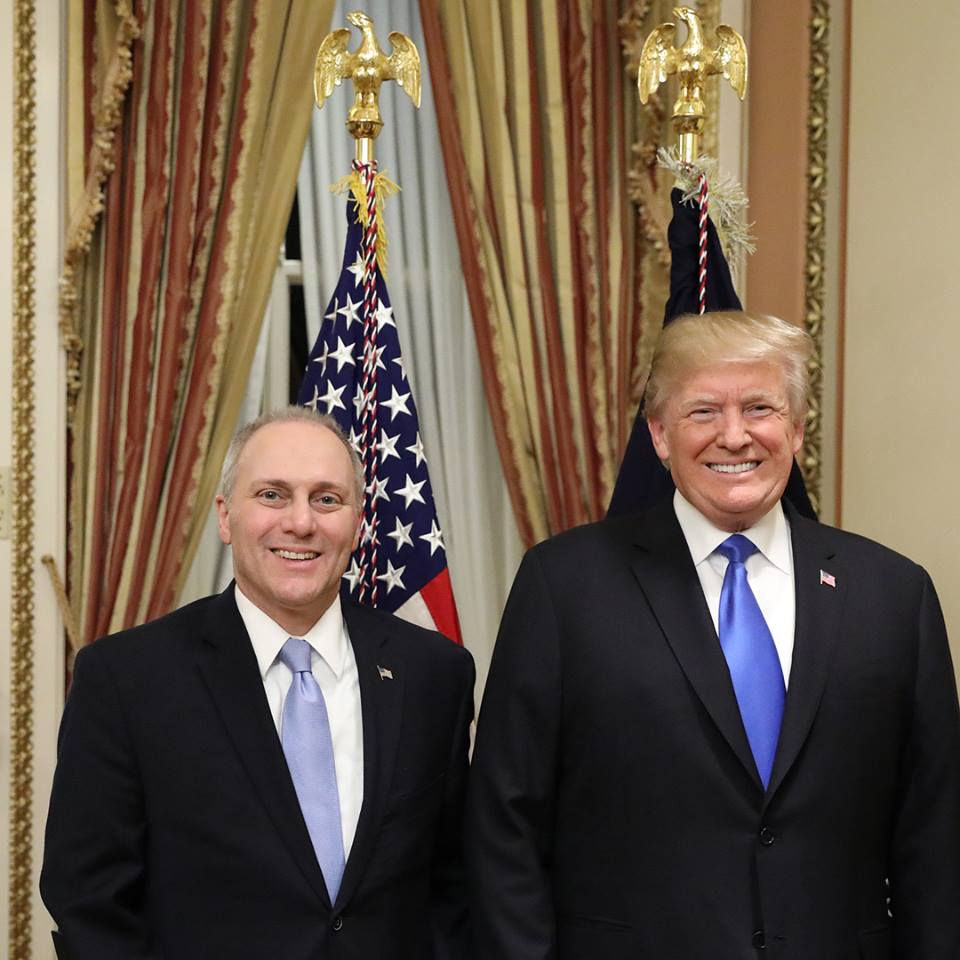
Scalise with President Donald Trump in 2018

=== Elections ===
2008 special election

In 2004, Scalise announced that he would run for the 1st congressional district, but deferred to the preference of party leaders and supported Bobby Jindal, who won the position vacated by the successful U.S. senatorial candidate, David Vitter.

In 2007, when Jindal was elected to the governorship of Louisiana, Scalise announced his intentions to seek the House seat again. This time he received Republican party backing.

Scalise was sworn in on May 7, 2008.

2008 general election

In the regularly scheduled election, Scalise was reelected over Democrat Jim Harlan, 66 percent to 34 percent.

2010

Scalise defeated the Democratic nominee, Myron Katz, and an Independent, Arden Wells, in his 2010 bid for reelection.

2012

In his own 2012 congressional race, Scalise prevailed with 193,490 votes (66.6 percent) over four opponents, the strongest of whom was the Democrat M. V. "Vinny" Mendoza, who finished with 61,979 votes (21.3 percent). A second Republican, Gary King, received 24,838 votes (8.6 percent). Independent Arden Wells ran again and received 4,285 votes (1.5 percent) in his second race against Scalise.

=== Committee assignments ===
- Committee on Energy and Commerce
  - Subcommittee on Communications and Technology
  - Subcommittee on Energy and Power
  - Subcommittee on Oversight and Investigations
- Select Subcommittee on the Coronavirus Crisis (Ranking Member)

=== Caucus memberships ===
- Congressional Western Caucus
- Republican Study Committee
- Congressional Caucus on Turkey and Turkish Americans

=== Tenure ===
In 2011, Scalise became a co-sponsor of Bill H.R. 3261, otherwise known as the Stop Online Piracy Act (withdrawn January 23, 2012). As chairman of the Republican Study Committee, Scalise dismissed Derek Khanna, a committee staffer, in December 2012 because of pressure from content industry lobbyists after the study committee published a memo advocating copyright reform.

In 2013, Scalise voted against reauthorizing the Violence Against Women Act. Also in 2013, Scalise sponsored a bill called the FCC Consolidated Reporting Act. The bill makes the Federal Communications Commission (FCC) consolidate several of their reports into one report.

In December 2017, Scalise voted in favor of the Tax Cuts and Jobs Act. Scalise says that the bill will "put more money in the pockets of hard-working families."

Scalise was the ranking Republican on the House Select Subcommittee on the Coronavirus Crisis during the May 19, 2021, hearings involving Emergent BioSolutions founder Faud El-Hibiri and its CEO Robert G. Kramer.

Being the most senior member in the House GOP leadership, Scalise plays the role of elder statesman offering his institutional knowledge to younger members and leaders.

=== Leadership race ===
In the aftermath of Rep. Eric Cantor's unexpected defeat by Dave Brat on June 10, 2014, Scalise launched a campaign to replace Rep. Kevin McCarthy in the position of majority whip of the House; McCarthy himself would replace Cantor as House majority leader. Scalise's ascent to leadership built on his "come-from-behind win in 2012 to become chairman" of the Republican Study Committee. Scalise subsequently won a three-way race for whip, winning on the first ballot despite the efforts of fellow candidates Peter Roskam and Marlin Stutzman. He came under fire for using the assistance of a federal lobbyist, John Feehery, when hiring staff for the Majority Leader's Press Office.

=== Congressional baseball shooting ===
On June 14, 2017, at 7:09 am EDT, Scalise and three other people were shot and wounded by James Hodgkinson, a left-wing extremist with a record of domestic violence, who opened fire with a rifle during a baseball practice of the Republican team for the annual Congressional Baseball Game. The practice was taking place at the Eugene Simpson Baseball Fields in the Del Ray neighborhood of Alexandria, Virginia. Scalise, the only member of Congress to be hit, was shot in the hip. Representative Mo Brooks, who was also at the practice, witnessed the attack and said he saw someone with a rifle behind the third base dugout. Brooks then heard Scalise scream from second base. Scalise crawled into right field, bleeding. Senator Jeff Flake and Representative Brad Wenstrup, a former podiatrist, ran to assist Scalise after Hodgkinson was shot. Senator Rand Paul, also a witness, said he heard "as many as 50 shots".

Initially conscious, Scalise went into shock while being taken to MedStar Washington Hospital Center in critical condition, where he underwent immediate surgery. He was hit by a single rifle bullet that "travelled across his pelvis, fracturing bones, injuring internal organs, and causing severe bleeding". Dr. Jack Sava at the MedStar Washington Hospital Center said that "when he arrived, he was in critical condition with an imminent risk of death". By June 16, although still in critical condition, Sava said, "We have controlled internal bleeding and his vital signs have stabilized." On June 17, it was announced that his condition had improved to "serious" and he was responsive enough to talk with his family. On June 21, the hospital issued a press release stating: "Congressman Steve Scalise continues to make good progress. He is now listed in fair condition and is beginning an extended period of healing and rehabilitation."

On July 5, 2017, Scalise returned to the intensive care unit after becoming ill with an infection related to the shooting.

On July 13, 2017, it was reported that Scalise had undergone additional surgery and that his condition had been upgraded to fair. He was discharged from the hospital on July 26 and went through a period of inpatient rehabilitation. On September 28, to applause and cheers, he returned to the House of Representatives, where he gave a speech about his experience related to the traumatic events.

Hodgkinson, 66, was killed by police at the scene. He was married and lived in Belleville, Illinois, where he owned a small business doing home inspections, mold testing, and air-quality testing. He had encounters with police involving violence or firearms in 2006 and 2017; he was registered as a firearms owner in Illinois. In January 2017 he closed down his business. In the months before the shooting he was living in a car near the Alexandria baseball field and regularly visited a nearby YMCA. He was a Bernie Sanders supporter and volunteer, and a fierce critic of Trump and the Republican Party on social media, in letters to the editor, and in phone calls to his representative. Virginia attorney general Mark Herring concluded Hodgkinson was "fueled by rage against Republican legislators" and the shooting was "an act of terrorism."

=== House Minority Whip ===
The Republicans lost their majority in the 2018 House of Representatives elections, and Scalise was elected as House minority whip, with Kevin McCarthy of California as Minority Leader. While as Majority Whip he was the third-ranking House Republican behind Speaker Paul Ryan and McCarthy, as Minority Whip he was second in command behind McCarthy.

=== 2020 presidential election and aftermath ===
On January 6, 2021, Scalise voted to de-certify President-elect Biden's victories in Arizona and Pennsylvania.

Scalise condemned the Capitol attack as terrorism and compared it to the Congressional baseball shooting. "It would ... be naive to think the [2017] shooter arrived at his decision in a vacuum", Scalise said, adding, "It would be equally naive to think that the Capitol rioters arrived at their decisions in a void. Violent rhetoric helps radicalize people. Republicans and Democrats alike must have the moral clarity to call this language out whenever it is spoken, not only when it comes from the other side of the political aisle."

In February 2021, more than a month after Joe Biden's inauguration, Scalise refused to acknowledge that the election was not stolen or fraudulent. In May 2021, he called for the ouster of Liz Cheney as House Republican Conference chair due to her vote to impeach Trump for inciting a mob to attack the U.S. Capitol. On May 19, 2021, Scalise and the seven other House Republican leaders voted against establishing a national commission to investigate the January 6, 2021, attack on the United States Capitol Complex. Thirty-five House Republicans and all 217 Democrats present voted to establish such a commission.

In October 2021, Fox News anchor Chris Wallace interviewed Scalise. In the aftermath of controversy surrounding the 2020 presidential election, Scalise refused to acknowledge the loss of president Donald Trump. His refusal to admit Trump's loss was viewed as fear of Trump's vindictiveness and willingness to kowtow to Trump in order to avoid being targeted by Trump.

=== House Majority Leader ===
The House Republican Conference elected Scalise to serve as Majority Leader during the 118th Congress. Scalise was unopposed for the position. In this post, he remained second in command to McCarthy, who as Speaker remained leader of the House Republicans.

=== 2023 Speaker of the House election ===
On October 3, 2023 Kevin McCarthy was removed as Speaker of the House. Days later, House Republicans chose Scalise over Jim Jordan as their candidate for Speaker of the House, by a margin of 113 to 99. After failing to consolidate the necessary 217 Republican votes to become the Speaker of the House, Scalise withdrew his name from consideration as a nominee for the Speakership. Fellow Louisianan Mike Johnson was ultimately elected Speaker, and Scalise stayed on as majority leader.

== Political positions ==
=== Discrimination ===
Scalise voted against the Equality Act of 2021.

=== Environment ===
Scalise rejects the scientific consensus on climate change. He has on multiple occasions stated that scientists predicted global cooling in the 1970s.

=== Gun law ===
Scalise has been an opponent of gun control and was given an "A+ rating" and endorsed by the NRA Political Victory Fund. After being shot, and in the wake of the 2017 Las Vegas shooting, Scalise said on Meet the Press that he is still a gun rights supporter: "Don't try to put new laws in place that don't fix these problems. They only make it harder for law-abiding citizens to own a gun." Scalise has described the Second Amendment as being "unlimited".

In 2018, Scalise co-sponsored a bill to "strengthen school safety and security", which required a two-thirds vote for passage given that it was brought up under an expedited process known as Suspension of the Rules. The House voted 407–10 to approve the bill, which would "provide $50 million a year for a new federal grant program to train students, teachers and law enforcement on how to spot and report signs of gun violence". Entitled the STOP (Students, Teachers, and Officers Preventing) School Violence Act, it would "develop anonymous telephone and online systems where people could report threats of violence." At the same time, it would authorize $25 million for schools to improve and harden their security, such as installing new locks, lights, metal detectors and panic buttons. A separate spending bill would be required to provide money for the grant program.

=== Health care ===
Scalise opposes the Affordable Care Act. He applauded Reed O'Connor ruling the Affordable Care Act was unconstitutional in its entirety. Scalise voted for the American Health Care Act of 2017.

Scalise voted against the Women's Health Protection Act.

=== Immigration ===
Scalise supported President Donald Trump's 2017 executive order temporarily banning citizens of seven Muslim-majority countries from entering the U.S. He stated, "It's very prudent to say, 'Let's be careful about who comes into our country to make sure that they're not terrorists.'"

=== Internet ===
Scalise voted for the Protecting Americans from Foreign Adversary Controlled Applications Act.

=== Israel ===
Scalise has expressed a concern over "a growing antisemitism" specifically on university campuses which "this House Republican majority has been very vocal – not only standing with Israel, but standing up against the evil hatred of antisemitism. We have to be clear with a voice that we will not tolerate it" Scalise's stance "standing up against the evil hatred of antisemitism" has been contrasted to his 2002 appearance at David Dukes Euro.

Scalise was reported to have suggested revoking the accreditation of universities that allow pro-Palestinian protests on university campuses.

=== Labor ===
Scalise voted against the Protecting the Right to Organize Act.

=== LGBT rights ===
According to the Washington Blade, Scalise has one of "the most anti-LGBT reputations of any lawmaker". He opposed the repeal of the US military's Don't Ask Don't Tell policy, stating "military leaders we've spoken with feel strongly that this policy should not be repealed" and including sexuality under hate crime legislation, voting against the Matthew Shepard and James Byrd Jr. Hate Crimes Prevention Act. He also opposes same-sex marriage, having praised the 2014 Robicheaux v. Caldwell ruling. Scalise condemned the Supreme Court decision Obergefell v. Hodges, which held that same-sex marriage bans violate the constitution. Scalise's voting record has a zero rating from the LGBT advocacy group Human Rights Campaign. Scalise voted against the Respect for Marriage Act.

=== One Big Beautiful Bill Act ===
Scalise voted for the One Big Beautiful Bill Act which extended many tax cuts from the Tax Cuts and Jobs Act which Scalise also voted for.

=== Public media ===
Scalise sponsored the Rescissions Act of 2025.

=== Veterans ===
Scalise voted against the Honoring our PACT Act of 2022.

== Controversies ==
=== Speech at white nationalist convention ===
In 2002, Scalise was a speaker at a convention for the European-American Unity and Rights Organization (EURO), a group which was founded by David Duke. This became known in 2014 after political blogger Lamar White, Jr. uncovered anonymous comments from 2002 on Stormfront, a white supremacist website, which made reference to Scalise as a 2002 speaker at the convention. Scalise confirmed that he had spoken at the EURO conference in 2002 and stated at the time he did not know of the "racist nature of the group". Scalise said he spoke about state tax legislation and that EURO was "one of the many groups that I spoke to regarding this critical legislation," further stating that this is a group "whose views I wholeheartedly condemn." Scalise apologized for speaking to the group, saying, "It was a mistake I regret, and I emphatically oppose the divisive racial and religious views groups like these hold." After Scalise's attendance at the conference was publicized in 2014, journalist Stephanie Grace alleged that Scalise had once called himself "David Duke without the baggage".

Various Louisiana politicians, including Republican governor Bobby Jindal and Democratic congressman Cedric Richmond, defended Scalise's character. Speaker of the House John Boehner voiced his continued confidence in Scalise as Majority Whip saying that he had "made an error in judgment" and was "a man of high integrity and good character." Several Democratic members of Congress, as well as Mo Elleithee, a spokesperson for the Democratic National Committee (DNC), criticized Scalise and challenged his statement that he was not aware of the group's affiliation with racism and anti-Semitism. Mark Potok, of the Southern Poverty Law Center, called upon Scalise to step down from his leadership position as Majority Whip.

=== Ady Barkan video ===
In 2020, Scalise spread a video that was doctored to depict the political activist Ady Barkan, who was disabled and used a speech-generating device, asking 2020 presidential candidate Joe Biden whether he supported defunding police, to which Biden appeared to reply in the affirmative. Barkan asked Scalise to delete the video, which was flagged by Twitter as manipulated media, and apologize. Scalise deleted the video; his spokesperson said that editing the video in this manner was "common practice." NowThis News posted the interview section on Police Reform on YouTube showing in fact Barkan asked Biden about police reform, including defunding them and Biden agreed stating he proposed that kind of reform.

== Personal life ==
A Catholic, Scalise married Jennifer Ann Letulle on March 19, 2005. They have two children.

=== Health ===
On August 29, 2023, Scalise announced he had been diagnosed with multiple myeloma. He said the cancer was detected early and was "very treatable". On September 14, Scalise returned to work, having begun chemotherapy, and reported that his treatment was "going well."

== See also ==
- List of members of the United States Congress killed or wounded in office

U.S. House of Representatives
Preceded by Bobby Jindal	Member of the U.S. House of Representatives from Louisiana's 1st congressional district 2008–present	Incumbent
Preceded by Kevin McCarthy	House Majority Whip; 2014–2019	Succeeded by Jim Clyburn
Preceded by Steny Hoyer	House Minority Whip; 2019–2023	Succeeded by Katherine Clark
Preceded by Steny Hoyer	House Majority Leader; 2023–present	Incumbent
Party political offices
Preceded by Jim Jordan	Chair of the Republican Study Committee; 2013–2014	Succeeded by Rob Woodall
U.S. order of precedence (ceremonial)
Preceded by André Carson	United States representatives by seniority 65th	Succeeded by Brett Guthrie
Preceded by Josh Green as Governor of Hawaii	Order of precedence of the United States	Succeeded by Hakeem Jeffries as House Minority Leader
