= Laurie Schlegel =

American politician

Member of the Louisiana House of Representatives from the 82nd district
- Incumbent
- Assumed office May 10, 2021
- Preceded by: Charles Henry

Personal details
- Party: Republican
- Education: Louisiana State University (BS); New Orleans Baptist Theological Seminary (MA)

Laurie Garrand Schlegel is an American politician who is a member of the Louisiana House of Representatives from the 82nd district. She assumed office on May 10, 2021.

== Education ==
Schlegel attended St. Mary's Dominican High School in New Orleans. She earned a Bachelor of Science degree in psychology from Louisiana State University and a Master of Arts in marriage and family counseling from the New Orleans Baptist Theological Seminary.

== Career ==
Schlegel began her career as a sales manager for Marriott International. From 2001 to 2011, she was a pharmaceutical sales representative for AstraZeneca. In 2014 and 2015, she was a counselor for Catholic Counseling Services. Since 2015, she has worked for Lighthouse Counseling Center. She is a certified sex addiction counselor. She was elected to the Louisiana House of Representatives in a May 2021 special election, succeeding Charles Henry.

== Political positions ==
Schlegel has supported legislation that would ban transgender girls from competing on girls' sports teams in schools.

In 2022, she sponsored a bill requiring online pornographic content providers to verify that end-users in Louisiana are 18 or older. After the bill was passed, it was mostly ignored in the press but has served as a blueprint for similar legislation in other states and has been described as a significant step towards the Supreme Court reconsidering previous decisions in this field.
