= Louisiana's 9th State Senate district =

American legislative district

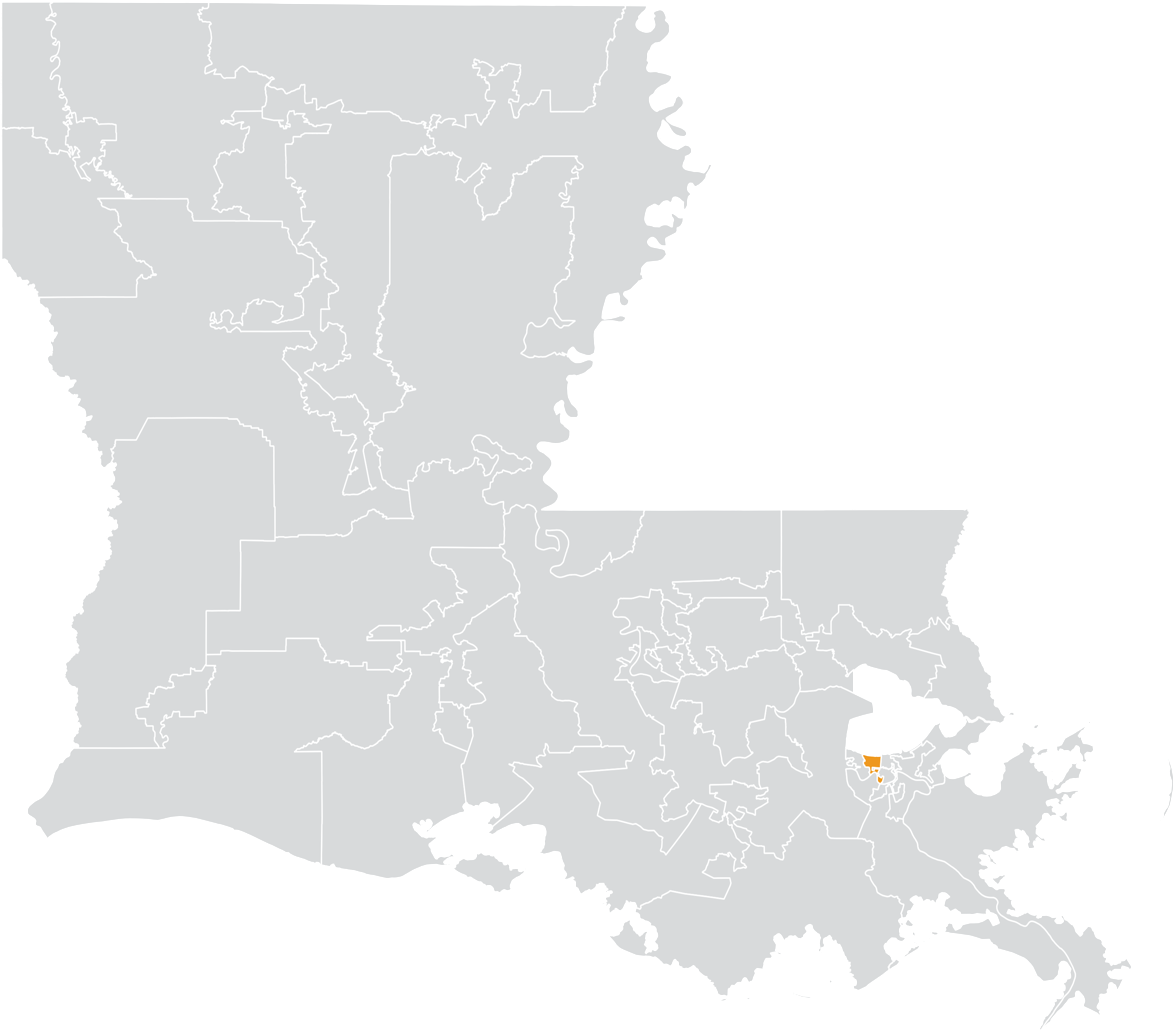
Senator
Cameron Henry; R–Metairie
- Registration: 41.0% Republican; 30.2% Democratic; 28.8% No party preference
- Demographics: 71% White; 9% Black; 15% Hispanic; 4% Asian; 1% Other
- Population (2019): 121,302
- Registered voters: 77,052

Louisiana's 9th State Senate district is one of 39 districts in the Louisiana State Senate. It has been represented by Republican Cameron Henry since 2020, succeeding fellow Republican Conrad Appel.

== Geography ==
District 9 is based in the Jefferson Parish city of Metairie, also incorporating smaller parts of Jefferson and Uptown New Orleans.

The district overlaps with Louisiana's 1st and 2nd congressional districts, and with the 79th, 80th, 82nd, 94th, and 98th districts of the Louisiana House of Representatives.

== Recent election results ==
Louisiana uses a jungle primary system. If no candidate receives 50% in the first round of voting, when all candidates appear on the same ballot regardless of party, the top-two finishers advance to a runoff election.

=== 2019 ===
2019 Louisiana State Senate election, District 9
Party	Candidate	Votes	%
Republican	Cameron Henry	23,647	78.4
Republican	Jon "Frankie" Hyers	6,524	21.6
Total votes		30,171	100
Republican hold			

=== 2015 ===
2015 Louisiana State Senate election, District 9
Party	Candidate	Votes	%
Republican	Conrad Appel (incumbent)	14,701	57.0
Republican	John LaBruzzo	11,109	43.0
Total votes		25,810	100
Republican hold			

=== 2011 ===
2011 Louisiana State Senate election, District 9
Party	Candidate	Votes	%
Republican	Conrad Appel (incumbent)	Unopposed	100
Total votes		Unopposed	100
Republican hold			

=== Federal and statewide results ===
Year	Office	Results
2020	President	Trump 61.4–36.6%
2019	Governor (runoff)	Edwards 52.5–47.5%
2016	President	Trump 62.2–32.2%
2015	Governor (runoff)	Vitter 57.6–42.4%
2014	Senate (runoff)	Cassidy 63.5–36.5%
2012	President	Romney 69.3–28.2%
