= Lamar White Jr. =

American journalist

- Born: May 5, 1982 (age 44); Alexandria, Louisiana, U.S.
- Education: Rice University; Southern Methodist University
- Occupations: Activist, writer

Lamar White Jr. (born 1982) is an American publisher, investigative journalist, political blogger, and civil rights activist from New Orleans, Louisiana. He is the founder and publisher of The Bayou Brief a non-profit, Louisiana-based news and culture publication.

White is primarily known for his investigative reporting on racism and political corruption in the American Deep South.

== Early life ==
White was born in Alexandria, Louisiana and graduated from Alexandria Senior High School, a public high school in Rapides Parish, in 2000. At the age of twelve months, he was diagnosed with spastic quadriplegia, a subset of cerebral palsy, which required a series of corrective orthopedic and neurological medical procedures and daily physical therapy. His parents, Carol Rhodes White and Lamar White Sr. were both regionally well-known and successful real estate brokers and investors.

After high school, White graduated from Rice University in Houston earning a BA in English and Religious Studies. In 2001, when he was a freshman at Rice, his father died in a single car accident at the age of 41.

White returned to his hometown of Alexandria in 2005 to work for the mayoral campaign of Jacques Roy and subsequently as Roy's publicist and special assistant. In 2011, he moved to Dallas, Texas, and enrolled in law school at Southern Methodist University, his late father's alma mater.

He is the grandson of philanthropist Joanne Lyles White, a and the great-nephew of the late historian Sue Eakin.

== Career ==
In 2005, White launched CenLamar, a self-published political commentary website about Louisiana. Although the website was never a professional venture, his work as a freelance blogger eventually attracted statewide attention and notoriety. A decade later, when he shuttered the publication, the site had attracted more than two million readers.

In 2012, White was the last person to engage in an online argument with the conservative new media mogul Andrew Breitbart, minutes before he unexpectedly died. Breitbart's final tweet is an apology to White for calling him a "putz".

Later that year, White first exposed problems in Louisiana voucher schools, including Light City Academy, which was led by a self-proclaimed "prophet" who taught students how to become "prophets." Light City Academy was closely associated with several questionable nonprofit organizations; there were questions about the financing of the school. Following White's report, Light City Academy was prohibited from accepting any additional voucher students.

In October 2014, White advocated on behalf of Texas Democratic gubernatorial candidate Wendy Davis, who was defeated in 2014 by Republican Greg Abbott. Davis featured White as a speaker about disability rights and Governor-elect Abbott's record on the Americans with Disabilities Act. White wrote for the Houston Chronicle about his disability and the identity politics surrounding disabilities.

=== Steve Scalise controversy ===
On December 29, 2014, White published evidence on CenLamar that Representative Steve Scalise had attended an international white supremacist conference in 2002. Scalise admitted his attendance to The Washington Post.

=== Bobby Jindal portrait ===
On February 3, 2015, White tweeted a photograph of a portrait of former Louisiana Governor Bobby Jindal. The portrait, which White incorrectly described as the governor's official portrait, had been displayed prominently at the entrance to his office in the state Capitol. The portrait depicted Jindal, an Indian-American, as significantly more light-skinned than he appears, spurring a national discussion about racial identity and representation.

On September 10, 2018, White uncovered evidence that bot accounts had been inundating Twitter with identical messages of support for U.S. Senator Ted Cruz during the middle of his intense campaign against Democratic challenger Beto O'Rourke. White's tweet about this suspicious online activity was shared more than 35,000 times and was read by more than 3.5 million people within a day.

=== Cindy Hyde-Smith public hanging remarks ===
On November 11, 2018, White published a ten-second video clip of interim U.S. Senator Cindy Hyde-Smith of Mississippi at a small gathering in Tupelo. The video shows the end of a local cattle rancher praising the senator. Hyde-Smith then says, "If he invited me to a public hanging, I'd be on the front row." White's publication of her comments quickly went viral, which many understood to be a clear reference to lynchings, and Hyde-Smith, whose opponent is an African American, was swiftly condemned by civil rights leaders and organizations across the country. Hyde-Smith refused to apologize, and instead, she claimed her comment was an "exaggerated expression of regard".
