= Jean-Paul Morrell =

American politician

J. P. Morrell

President of the New Orleans City Council
- Incumbent
- Assumed office January 5, 2023
- Preceded by: Helena Moreno

Member of the New Orleans City Council from the at-large district
- Incumbent
- Assumed office January 10, 2022
- Preceded by: Donna Glapion

Member of the Louisiana Senate from the 3rd district
- In office January 2008 – January 13, 2020
- Succeeded by: Joseph Bouie

Member of the Louisiana House of Representatives from the 97th district
- In office January 2006 – January 2008
- Preceded by: Arthur Morrell

Personal details
- Born: September 2, 1978 (age 47) New Orleans, Louisiana, U.S.
- Party: Democratic
- Spouse: Catherine Morrell
- Children: 1 daughter 2 sons
- Education: Spring Hill College (BS); Tulane University (JD)

Jean-Paul "JP" Morrell (born 1978) is an American politician and public defender who has served as an at-large member of the New Orleans City Council since January 2022 and as president since 2023.

== Education ==
Morrell graduated with a B.S. from Spring Hill College, where he was a member of Tau Kappa Epsilon fraternity, and later earned his JD from Tulane University Law School.

== Career ==
Morrell was a member of the Louisiana State Senate for District 3 from 2008 to 2020, and briefly served in the Louisiana House of Representatives from 2006 to 2008 representing District 97 to fill the unexpired term of his father, Arthur Morrell. He was re-elected to the House in 2007 and served until 2008, before running for the State Senate. He was elected to the Senate in a special election held on December 6, 2008. He served until 2020.

Morrell faced fellow Democrats Kristin Palmer and Jared Brossett in the November 13, 2021 election for the at-large Division 2 seat on the City Council, and was elected with an outright majority of 50.7% against Palmer's 31.7% and Brossett's 11.1%. He was sworn in on January 10, 2022. He succeeded Donna Glapion and became city council president in 2023.

== Personal life ==
His mother is Cynthia Hedge-Morrell, who served on the New Orleans City Council from 2005 to 2014. He is Catholic.
