= Rodney Lyons =

American politician (born 1962)

Rodney S. Lyons Sr.

Louisiana State Representative for District 87 (Jefferson Parish)
- Incumbent
- Assumed office January 2016
- Preceded by: Ebony Woodruff

Personal details
- Born: December 1962 (age 63) New Orleans, La.
- Party: Democratic
- Spouse: Sharon
- Occupation: Retired parish employee

Rodney S. Lyons Sr. (born December 1962) is a Democratic member of the Louisiana House of Representatives for District 87 in Jefferson Parish, a suburban area outside New Orleans, Louisiana. In January 2016, he succeeded Democrat Ebony Woodruff, whom he unseated in the primary election held on October 24, 2015. Lyons polled 2,883 votes (58.6 percent) to Woodruff's 2,034 (41.4 percent) in a low-turnout contest.

Lyons is a retired Superintendent with the Jefferson Parish Streets Department, Realtor and Director of a Business Consulting Company. He formerly coached high school and youth league basketball. He is a former president of the Woodmere Civic Association, an organization of homeowners in the largest subdivision in Louisiana. Lyons calls himself "a quick study" who has "the pulse of the community at my fingertips."

Louisiana House of Representatives
| Preceded by Ebony Woodruff | Louisiana State Representative for District 87 (Jefferson Parish); 2016 – | Succeeded by Incumbent |
