= Louisiana State Senate =

Upper house of the state legislature of Louisiana

- Louisiana State Legislature

Type
- Type: Upper house
- Term limits: 3 terms (12 years)

History
- New session started: January 8, 2024

Leadership
- President: Cameron Henry (R) since January 8, 2024
- President pro tempore: Regina Barrow (D) since January 8, 2024
- Majority Leader: Jeremy Stine (R) since January 8, 2024
- Minority Leader: Gerald Boudreaux (D) since May 10, 2021

Structure
- Seats: 39
- Political groups: Majority: Republican (28); Minority: Democratic (10); Vacancies: Vacant (1)
- Length of term: 4 years
- Authority: Article III, Section 3, Louisiana Constitution
- Salary: $16,800/year plus per diem

Elections
- Last election: October 14 and November 18, 2023 (39 seats)
- Next election: October 16 and November 20, 2027 (39 seats)
- Redistricting: Legislative Control

Meeting place
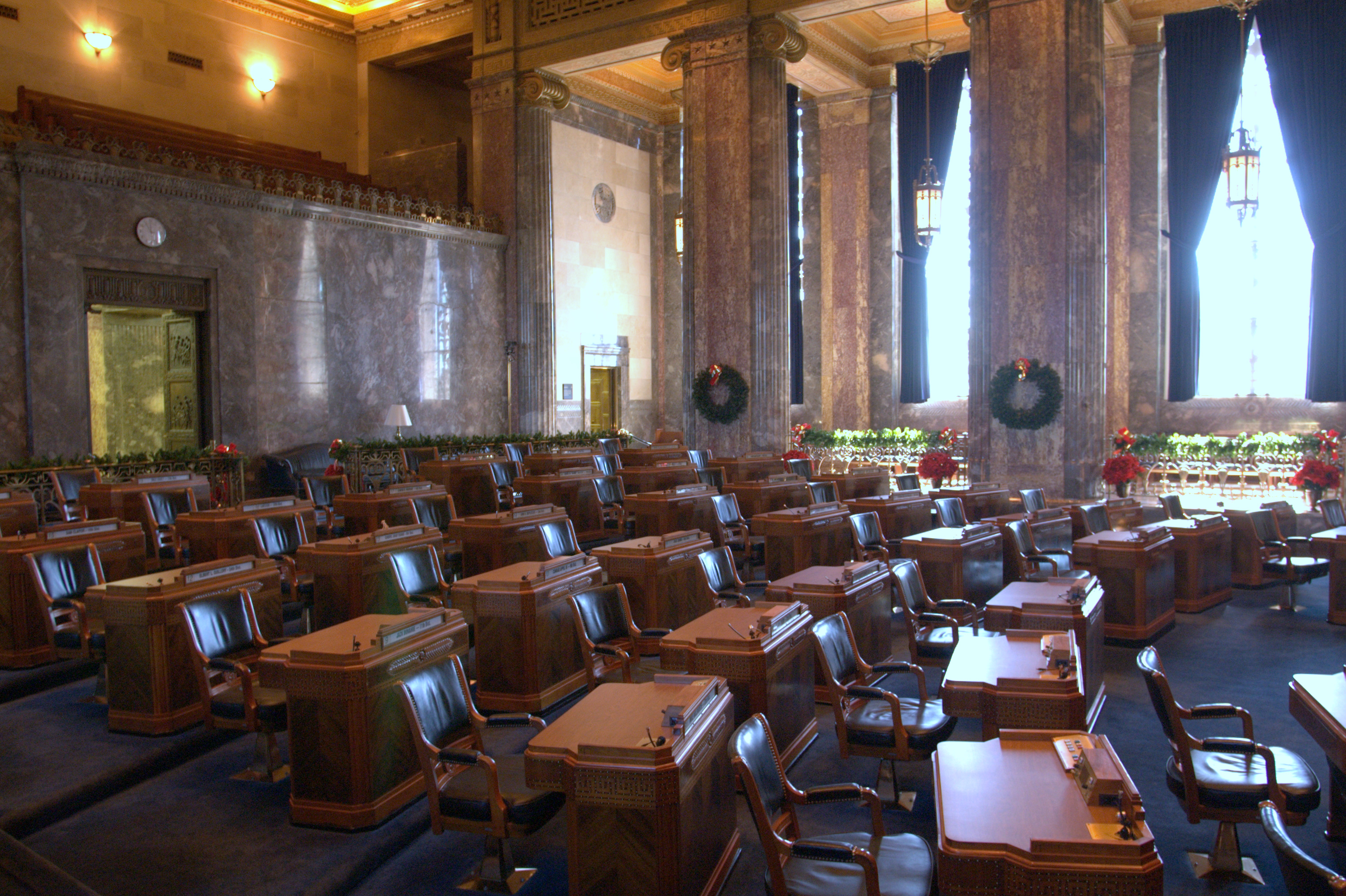
- State Senate Chamber; Louisiana State Capitol; Baton Rouge, Louisiana

Website
- Louisiana State Senate

Rules
- Senate Rules

The Louisiana State Senate is the upper house of the Louisiana State Legislature. The Senate has 39 seats, and the current Senate president is Cameron Henry. The current president pro tempore is Regina Barrow.

The chamber currently has 39 seats; as of July 2026, District 14 is vacant following the death of Senator Larry Selders.

== Composition ==
The Louisiana State Senate has 39 members elected from single-member districts. Candidates must be registered voters, at least 18 years old, residents of their district for one year, and Louisiana residents for two years. Senate elections use a nonpartisan primary system with runoffs if needed. Elections to the Senate occur every four years, and senators are limited to three four-year terms (12 years). If a seat is vacated during a term, it is filled in a special election. The Senate meets yearly alongside the House of Representatives. General sessions last 60 days in even years, and appropriations sessions last 45 days in odd years.

The Senate is the upper legislative chamber of the Louisiana State Legislature and, along with the Louisiana House of Representatives, constitutes the legislative power of the state of Louisiana. It tries officials impeached by the House of Representatives and confirms or rejects officials nominated by the governor of Louisiana.

Affiliation	Party (Shading indicates majority caucus)		Total	Vacant
Affiliation	Republican	Democratic	Total	Vacant
End of legislature 2023	27	12	39	0
Begin 2024	28	11	39	0
January 1, 2025 (Note: Republican Jean-Paul Coussan (District 23) resigned to become a member of the Louisiana Public Service Commission.)	27	11	38	1
January 3, 2025 (Note: Democrat Cleo Fields (District 14) resigned to take office in the United States House of Representatives.)	27	10	37	2
March 11, 2025 (Note: Democrat Larry Selders (District 14) and Republican Brach Myers (District 23) were sworn in.)	28	11	39	0
October 15, 2025 (Note: Democrat Joseph Bouie (District 3) resigned after being appointed chancellor of Southern University at New Orleans.)	28	10	38	1
March 24, 2026 (Note: Democrat Sidney Barthelemy II (District 3) was sworn in.)	28	11	39	0
July 7, 2026 (Note: Democrat Larry Selders (District 14) died.)	28	10	38	1
Latest voting share	73.7%	26.3%		

=== Members ===
District	Name	Party	District Office(s)	Start	Term-limited
1	Bob Owen	Republican	Slidell; Chalmette	2023	No
2	Ed Price	Democratic	Gonzales	2017	Yes
3	Sidney Barthelemy II	Democratic	New Orleans	2026	No
4	Jimmy Harris	Democratic	New Orleans	2019	No
5	Royce Duplessis	Democratic	New Orleans	2022	No
6	Rick Edmonds	Republican	Baton Rouge	2023	No
7	Gary Carter Jr.	Democratic	New Orleans	2021	No
8	Patrick Connick	Republican	Marrero	2019	No
9	Cameron Henry	Republican	Metairie	2019	No
10	Kirk Talbot	Republican	River Ridge	2019	No
11	Patrick McMath	Republican	Covington	2019	No
12	Beth Mizell	Republican	Franklinton	2015	Yes
13	Valarie Hodges	Republican	Denham Springs	2023	No
14	Vacant				
15	Regina Barrow	Democratic	Baton Rouge	2015	Yes
16	Franklin Foil	Republican	Baton Rouge	2019	No
17	Caleb Kleinpeter	Republican	Brusly	2022	No
18	Eddie J. Lambert	Republican	Prairieville	2015	Yes
19	Gregory A. Miller	Republican	Norco	2023	No
20	Mike Fesi	Republican	Houma	2019	No
21	Robert Allain III	Republican	Franklin	2023	No
22	Blake Miguez	Republican	New Iberia	2023	No
23	Brach Myers	Republican	Lafayette	2025	No
24	Gerald Boudreaux	Democratic	Lafayette	2015	Yes
25	Mark Abraham	Republican	Lake Charles	2019	No
26	Bob Hensgens	Republican	Abbeville	2018	No
27	Jeremy Stine	Republican	Lake Charles	2021	No
28	Heather Cloud	Republican	Turkey Creek	2019	No
29	Jay Luneau	Democratic	Alexandria	2015	Yes
30	Mike Reese	Republican	Leesville	2019	No
31	Alan Seabaugh	Republican	Shreveport	2023	No
32	Glen Womack	Republican	Harrisonburg	2019	No
33	Stewart Cathey Jr.	Republican	Monroe	2019	No
34	Katrina Jackson	Democratic	Monroe	2019	No
35	Jay Morris	Republican	West Monroe	2019	No
36	Adam Bass	Republican	Bossier City	2023	No
37	Bill Wheat	Republican	Ponchatoula	2023	No
38	Thomas Pressly	Republican	Shreveport	2023	No
39	Sam Jenkins	Democratic	Shreveport	2025	No

== Committee assignments ==
The Louisiana State Senate currently has standing, select, and statutory committees. The official Senate committees page lists the current standing committees and explains that most standing committees have seven members; certain committees have nine or eleven members.

== President of the senate ==
The Senate president, elected by its members, serves as its highest-ranking officer. The current president is Cameron Henry. The office is fifth in the gubernatorial line of succession, after the lieutenant governor, secretary of state, attorney general, and state treasurer.

The Louisiana Senate's official leadership history lists J. Cameron Henry, Jr. as president from 2024 to the present, and Regina Ashford Barrow as president pro tempore from 2024 to the present.

== Powers ==
The Senate president appoints the members of Senate and conference committees, unless otherwise provided by law, rule, or resolution, and appoints committee chairmen and vice chairmen as provided by Senate rules.

If a Senate seat becomes vacant before the end of the term, the Senate president issues the proclamation calling a special election.
