= Jimmy Kimmel test =

Political litmus test

The "Jimmy Kimmel test" is a political litmus test used in political discourse in the United States during 2017 efforts to repeal the Affordable Care Act. First proposed by United States Senator Bill Cassidy, the test was used throughout 2017 to frame political debate over health care reform, and Cassidy's use of it in September 2017 prompted comedian and late-night talk show host Jimmy Kimmel to publicly attack a Senate health care bill co-sponsored by Cassidy. The resulting public debate contributed to the failure of the Senate bill.

Kimmel described the test as measuring whether, as a result of health care reform, a family would "be denied medical care, emergency or otherwise, because they can't afford it."

== Background ==
=== Political efforts to repeal the Affordable Care Act ===
The Affordable Care Act, commonly called the "ACA" or "Obamacare", was enacted by the 111th United States Congress and signed into law by President Barack Obama in 2010. From 2011 to 2017, numerous attempts to repeal the Affordable Care Act were made by Republicans opposed to the law, although none were successful before President Obama left office on January 20, 2017.

On March 6, 2017, House Republicans announced a proposed replacement for the Affordable Care Act, the American Health Care Act (AHCA). The bill was withdrawn on March 24, 2017, after it was certain that the House would fail to garner enough votes to pass it. The result was in-fighting within the Republican Party. However, deliberations on the American Health Care Act continued.

=== Birth of Jimmy Kimmel's son ===
William ("Billy") John Kimmel, the son of comedian and late-night talk show host Jimmy Kimmel, was born on April 21, 2017. The infant was born with a rare congenital heart defect, tetralogy of Fallot (TOF) with pulmonary atresia, which was first detected by a nurse who noticed his purplish appearance when he was three hours old. He underwent successful surgery at three days old. Kimmel's show, Jimmy Kimmel Live!, was cancelled during the entire week of April 24 without public explanation so Kimmel could spend time with his family.

== Creation of the Jimmy Kimmel test ==
Jimmy Kimmel returned to the air on May 1, 2017. Kimmel chose to focus on his son's birth and health condition in his first episode back, inviting cardiac surgeon Dr. Mehmet Oz onto his show to explain his son's condition. During the show's opening monologue, Kimmel referenced Congress' efforts to repeal parts of the 2010 Affordable Care Act, and the possibility that repeal would lead to individuals with pre-existing medical conditions losing their health insurance:

Before 2014, if you were born with congenital heart disease like my son was, there was a good chance you’d never be able to get health insurance because you had a pre-existing condition. You were born with a pre-existing condition. And if your parents didn’t have medical insurance, you might not live long enough to even get denied because of a pre-existing condition. If your baby is going to die, and it doesn’t have to, it shouldn’t matter how much money you make.

— Jimmy Kimmel, May 1, 2017

Kimmel's monologue received substantial attention in the news and on social media. Within 24 hours, video of the monologue was viewed over 14 million times and received over 230,000 reactions on Facebook. The video was retweeted by former President Obama and former Presidential candidate Hillary Clinton.

On May 4, the House of Representatives passed the AHCA (which would repeal portions of the ACA), sending the bill to the Senate. On Friday, May 5, United States Senator Bill Cassidy told CNN that he would decide whether he would support the AHCA based on whether it would "pass the Jimmy Kimmel test", which he described as measuring whether a child born with a pre-existing health condition would continue to receive health care regardless of cost. Following Cassidy's comments, Kimmel invited Cassidy onto his show to discuss the Senate version of the bill. Cassidy appeared on Jimmy Kimmel Live! via satellite on May 8, 2017. While interviewing Cassidy, Kimmel attempted to establish a clearer definition of the "Jimmy Kimmel test".

Since I am Jimmy Kimmel, I would like to make a suggestion as to what the Jimmy Kimmel test should be. I’ll keep it simple. The Jimmy Kimmel test, I think, should be: No family should be denied medical care, emergency or otherwise, because they can’t afford it.

— Jimmy Kimmel, May 8, 2017

Cassidy responded that Kimmel was on the "right track", and then shifted the discussion to how to pay for insurance coverage.

== Use in political discourse ==
The "Jimmy Kimmel test" was regularly mentioned by pundits and observers in 2017 during national conversation on health care. CNN analyst Chris Cillizza described the Jimmy Kimmel test as becoming "the health care fight's measuring stick."

In June 2017, the test was used to quickly frame debate over the Senate version of an Affordable Care Act repeal bill. Shortly after the bill was unveiled to the public by Senate leadership, reporters asked Cassidy if he believed the Senate repeal bill would pass the Jimmy Kimmel test. Cassidy replied that he believed that it would, but that he needed to read the full text of the bill.

Multiple attempts to pass a Senate repeal bill in June and July 2017 failed. Senate Republicans faced a September 30, 2017 deadline in order to pass an Affordable Care Act repeal using reconciliation, a process that would permit the Senate to pass legislation with only 51 votes. On September 13, Cassidy and Sen. Lindsey Graham jointly proposed a new repeal bill, referred to as the Cassidy-Graham bill. The Cassidy-Graham proposal would create a waiver system allowing states to opt out of Affordable Care Act requirements, which could result in patients with pre-existing conditions being charged higher insurance premiums in those states. Discussion of the Cassidy-Graham bill quickly focused on whether the bill would pass the "Jimmy Kimmel test", with journalist and conservative commentator Jennifer Rubin writing on September 18 that Cassidy's bill "flunks his own Jimmy Kimmel test". Kimmel retweeted Rubin's editorial, which prompted Cassidy to publicly declare his belief that the Cassidy-Graham bill would "absolutely" pass the Jimmy Kimmel test.

Cassidy's claim sparked a public debate between Kimmel and Cassidy over whether the Cassidy-Graham bill passed the Jimmy Kimmel test. On September 19, national news outlets reported that Jimmy Kimmel was preparing to comment on the Cassidy-Graham bill. During Jimmy Kimmel Live! later that evening, Kimmel openly attacked the Cassidy-Graham bill, and told his viewers that Cassidy "lied to [Kimmel's] face" when Cassidy promised Kimmel he would not support a bill that could not pass the Jimmy Kimmel test. In his monologue, Kimmel also joked that the Cassidy-Graham bill would pass a different Jimmy Kimmel test, in which your child could afford health care only if the father was named Jimmy Kimmel.

Cassidy responded on September 20 during interviews with MSNBC and CNN, insisting the Cassidy-Graham bill would pass the Jimmy Kimmel test and claiming that Kimmel didn't understand the bill. Graham also attacked Kimmel, calling Kimmel's monologue "absolute garbage" and claiming that it was "inappropriate" for Kimmel to call Cassidy a liar. Kimmel responded in another on-air monologue on the evening of September 20, demonstrating his understanding of the bill by describing projected consequences such as a $243 billion reduction in federal funding, the total elimination of federal funding after 2026, and the removal of obligations by health insurers to pay for essential health benefits.

On September 21, President Donald Trump defended the Cassidy-Graham bill and its impact on individuals with pre-existing health conditions, which was seen as a sign of the influence the Kimmel-Cassidy dispute was having on the healthcare debate. Vanity Fair described Trump's tweets as defending a "bill that failed the Jimmy Kimmel test."

Senator John McCain announced on September 22 that he would vote against the Cassidy-Graham bill, a move which was labeled likely to kill the bill and Republicans' ACA repeal efforts. CNN analyst Bill Carter noted that Cassidy had dragged Kimmel into the debate by creating the "Jimmy Kimmel test", and said that if McCain's action does kill Republicans' repeal effort, Kimmel's opposition should be acknowledged as a legitimate factor in their failure. In a nationwide poll conducted September 22–25, 2017, voters were asked if they trusted Jimmy Kimmel or Republicans in Congress more on health care; 47% of respondents chose Kimmel while only 34% chose Republicans.

== See also ==
- Healthcare reform in the United States
