= Bill Cassidy =

American physician and politician (born 1957)

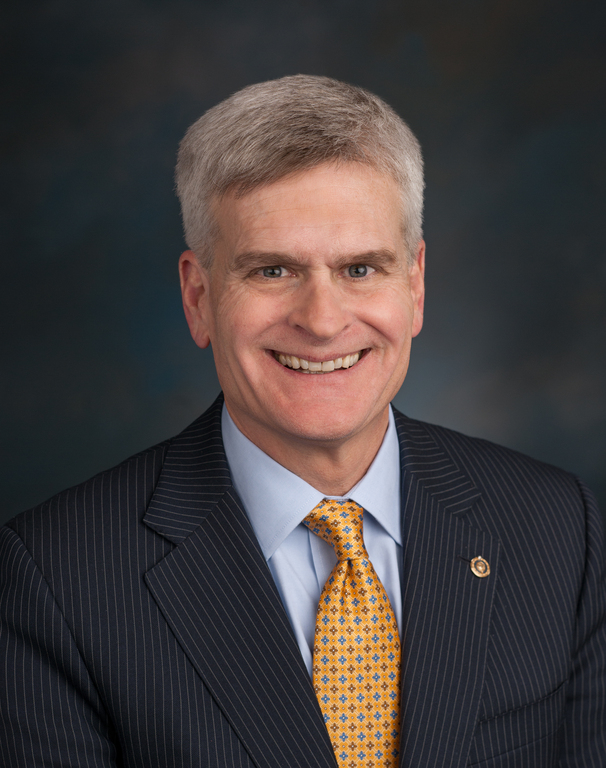
- Official portrait, 2015

Chair of the Senate Health, Education, Labor and Pensions Committee
- Incumbent
- Assumed office January 3, 2025
- Preceded by: Bernie Sanders

Ranking Member of the Senate Health, Education, Labor and Pensions Committee
- In office January 3, 2023 – January 3, 2025
- Preceded by: Richard Burr
- Succeeded by: Bernie Sanders

United States Senator from Louisiana
- Incumbent
- Assumed office January 3, 2015 Serving with John Kennedy
- Preceded by: Mary Landrieu
- Succeeded by: Julia Letlow (elect)

Member of the U.S. House of Representatives from Louisiana's 6th district
- In office January 3, 2009 – January 3, 2015
- Preceded by: Don Cazayoux
- Succeeded by: Garret Graves

Member of the Louisiana State Senate from the 16th district
- In office December 20, 2006 – January 3, 2009
- Preceded by: Jay Dardenne
- Succeeded by: Dan Claitor

Personal details
- Born: William Morgan Cassidy; September 28, 1957 (age 69) Highland Park, Illinois, U.S.
- Party: Republican
- Other political affiliations: Democratic (formerly)
- Spouse: Laura Layden (m. 1989)
- Children: 3
- Education: Louisiana State University (BS, MD)
- Website: Senate website Campaign website
- Cassidy's voice Cassidy on the 2018 NFC Championship Game. Recorded January 25, 2019

William Morgan Cassidy (born September 28, 1957) is an American politician and physician who is the senior United States senator from Louisiana, a seat he has held since 2015. A member of the Republican Party, he served in the Louisiana State Senate from 2006 to 2009 and in the U.S. House of Representatives from 2009 to 2015. Cassidy has chaired the Senate Health, Education, Labor, and Pensions (HELP) Committee since 2025.

Born in Highland Park, Illinois, Cassidy is a graduate of Louisiana State University (LSU) and LSU School of Medicine. A gastroenterologist, he was elected to the Louisiana State Senate from the 16th district, which included parts of Baton Rouge, in 2006. In 2008, he was elected as the U.S. representative for Louisiana's 6th congressional district, defeating Democratic incumbent Don Cazayoux. Cassidy was elected to the Senate in 2014, defeating Democratic incumbent Mary Landrieu. He was reelected in 2020.

A moderate Republican, Cassidy has been a critic of President Donald Trump. In 2021, he was one of seven Republican senators to vote to convict Trump of incitement of insurrection in his second impeachment trial. As a result, the Republican Party of Louisiana censured him. In 2023, after Trump was indicted for mishandling classified documents, Cassidy called for Trump to drop out of the 2024 presidential election. After Trump secured the Republican nomination, Cassidy declined to endorse him in the general election.

When Cassidy ran for reelection in 2026, Trump endorsed his challenger Julia Letlow in the Republican primary. Cassidy lost the May 16 primary in a landslide, receiving 24.8% of the vote and finishing third behind Letlow and state treasurer John Fleming. Cassidy is the first elected senator to lose renomination since 2012. (Note: Luther Strange of Alabama was appointed to the Senate after Jeff Sessions resigned, and lost nomination to finish the term in the 2017 special election to Roy Moore. Richard Lugar was the last elected senator to lose renomination, in 2012.)

== Early life and education ==
William Morgan Cassidy was born in Highland Park, Illinois, one of four sons of Elizabeth and James F. Cassidy, and is of Irish and Welsh descent. His family moved to Baton Rouge, Louisiana, when he was an infant. He received a Bachelor of Science from Louisiana State University in 1979 and a Doctor of Medicine from LSU School of Medicine in 1983. He completed his residency in internal medicine at University of Southern California/Los Angeles General Medical Center in 1987, followed by a hepatology-gastroenterology fellowship at the same institution in 1989.

== Early career ==
=== Medicine ===
After his medical training, Cassidy spent a year in Los Angeles as a liver specialist and internal medicine physician at the Cigna Medical Center before returning to Louisiana in 1990. He specialized in the treatment of liver disease at the Earl K. Long Medical Center (LSUMC).

In 1998, Cassidy helped found the Greater Baton Rouge Community Clinic to provide uninsured residents of the greater Baton Rouge area with access to free health care. The Clinic provides low-income families with free dental, medical, mental health, and vision care through a "virtual" approach that partners needy patients with doctors who provide care free of charge.

Cassidy has also been involved in setting up the nonprofit Health Centers in Schools, which vaccinates children in the East Baton Rouge Parish School System against hepatitis B and flu.

In the wake of Hurricane Katrina, Cassidy led a group of health care volunteers to convert an abandoned Kmart into an emergency health care facility, providing basic health care to hurricane victims.

In 2010, Cassidy's alma mater, Louisiana State University, selected him for honoris causa membership in Omicron Delta Kappa, the National Leadership Honor Society.

=== Politics ===
Cassidy was first elected to the Louisiana State Senate in 2006 as a Republican. He had previously been a Democrat, supporting Michael Dukakis for president in 1988 and donating to Senator Paul Tsongas's 1992 presidential campaign, Louisiana Governor Kathleen Blanco in 2003 and 2004, and Senator Mary Landrieu in 2002. In 2013, Cassidy called his donation to Landrieu a "youthful indiscretion", saying that she "got elected and fell into partisan politics.... Louisiana hasn't left Mary, Mary has left us." Since 2001, he has mostly contributed to Republican candidates, including Senator David Vitter. According to Cassidy, he switched parties after the extinction of conservative Democrats and because of his frustration with the bureaucracy and inefficiency of the public hospital system.

On December 9, 2006, Cassidy won a special election for the District 16 seat in the Louisiana Senate. In his first bid for public office, he defeated veteran State Representative and fellow Republican William Daniel, and Libertarian candidate S.B. Zaitoon. The election was held to replace Jay Dardenne, who vacated the seat he had held since 1992 upon his election as Louisiana Secretary of State. Cassidy was sworn in on December 20, 2006. On October 20, 2007, he was reelected to a full four-year term in the Louisiana State Senate. Cassidy received 76% of the vote against Republican Troy "Rocco" Moreau (15%) and Libertarian Richard Fontanesi (9%).

== U.S. House of Representatives (2009-2015) ==
=== Elections ===
On November 4, 2008, Cassidy was elected to serve Louisiana's 6th district in the U.S. House of Representatives, defeating incumbent Democratic Congressman Don Cazayoux with 48% of the vote. State Representative Michael L. Jackson, who had run against Cazayoux in the special election, ran as an independent in the general election and finished third with 36,100 votes, more than the 25,000-vote margin separating Cassidy and Cazayoux.

In the 2010 midterm elections, Cassidy easily won a second term, defeating Democrat Merritt E. McDonald of Baton Rouge with 66% of the vote. In the 2012 election, Cassidy was reelected again defeating Rufus Holt Craig, Jr., a Libertarian, and Richard Torregano, an independent. Cassidy received 79% of the vote.

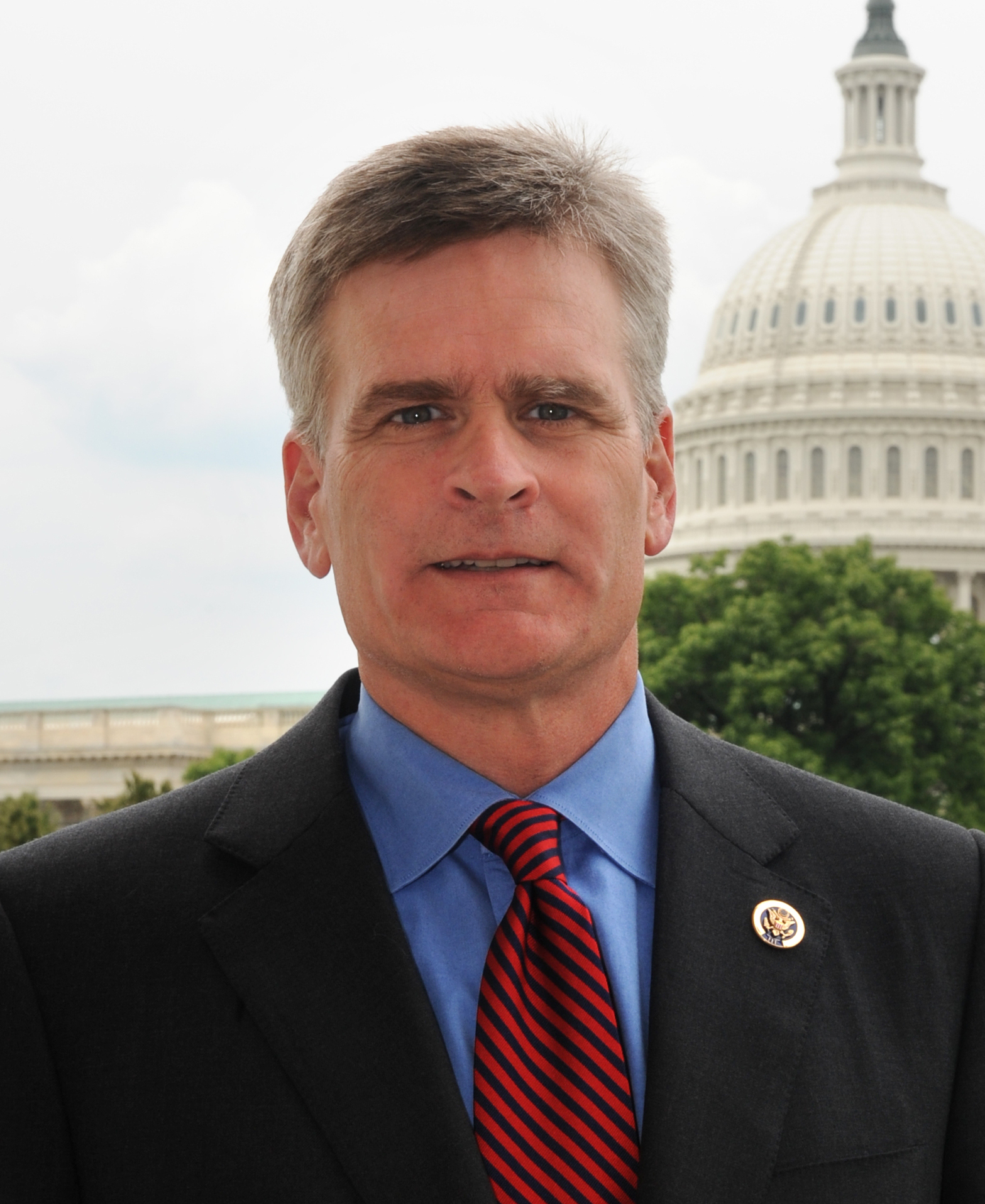
Cassidy during 111th Congress

=== Tenure ===
In May 2009, Cassidy partnered with California Democratic Representative Jackie Speier to introduce legislation that would amend the House of Representatives rules to require that members of Congress list their earmark requests on their congressional websites. Previous earmark reform efforts had focused on disclosure of earmarks that were funded by Congress. In June 2010, he introduced the Gulf Coast Jobs Preservation Act to terminate the moratorium on deep water drilling and require the Secretary of the Interior to ensure the safety of deep water drilling operations. He worked to ensure that money from the Gulf Coast Restoration Trust Fund which was established in the wake of the BP oil spill, is spent on coastal restoration efforts.

In December 2010, Cassidy voted to extend the tax cuts enacted during the administration of President George W. Bush. He voted for the Constitutional Balanced Budget Amendment of 2011.

In May 2013, Cassidy introduced the Energy Consumers Relief Act of 2013 (H.R. 1582) to require the Environmental Protection Agency (EPA) to submit reports to both the United States Congress and the United States Department of Energy regarding proposed regulation that would have significant compliance costs (an impact of over $1 billion). The Department of Energy and Congress would then have the option of stopping or altering the EPA proposal.

In 2013, due to the American Medical Association's decision to officially recognize obesity as a disease, Senators and Representatives, including Cassidy, helped introduce legislation to lower health care costs and prevent chronic diseases by addressing America's growing obesity crisis. Cassidy said the Treat and Reduce Obesity Act could help empower physicians to use all methods and means to fight the condition.

In June 2013, Cassidy supported a House-passed bill that federally banned abortions after 20 weeks of pregnancy. Also in 2013, Cassidy circulated a draft letter opposing an immigration reform bill, asking for signatures. Democratic Representative Mark Takano, a high school literature teacher for 23 years, marked it up in red pen like a school assignment and gave it an F, with comments like, "exaggeration -- avoid hyperbole," and "contradicts earlier statement."

In 2014 Cassidy co-sponsored an amendment to the Homeowner Flood Insurance Affordability Act in 2014 to limit annual premium increases for flood insurance, reinstate the flood insurance program's grandfathering provision, and eliminate a provision that required an increase to actuarial levels when a home is sold.

Cassidy was a vocal opponent of the Patient Protection and Affordable Care Act (commonly called Obamacare or the Affordable Care Act), arguing that it would fail to lower costs and give too much decision-making authority to the federal government. In September 2014, the House passed the Employee Health Care Protection Act of 2013 (H.R. 3522; 113th Congress), sponsored by Cassidy, enabling Americans to keep health insurance policies that do not meet all of the Affordable Care Act's requirements. In March 2017, Cassidy sent a letter to one of his constituents that falsely asserted that Obamacare "allows a presidentially handpicked 'Health Choices Commissioner' to determine what coverage and treatments are available to you."

Cassidy supported the Lowering Gasoline Prices to Fuel an America That Works Act of 2014 (H.R. 4899; 113th Congress), a bill to revise existing laws regarding the development of oil and gas resources on the Outer Continental Shelf. The bill was intended to increase domestic energy production and lower gas prices. He argued that the bill "would allow us to take advantage of our natural resources and expands our energy manufacturing and construction industries."

=== Committee assignments (113th Congress) ===
- Committee on Energy and Commerce
  - Subcommittee on Health
  - Subcommittee on Environment and Economy
  - Subcommittee on Energy and Power

=== Caucuses ===
While in the House of Representatives, Cassidy was a member of many congressional caucuses, including the Tea Party Caucus and the Republican Study Committee.

- Congressional Coalition on Adoption
- Senate Taiwan Caucus

== U.S. Senate (2015-2027) ==
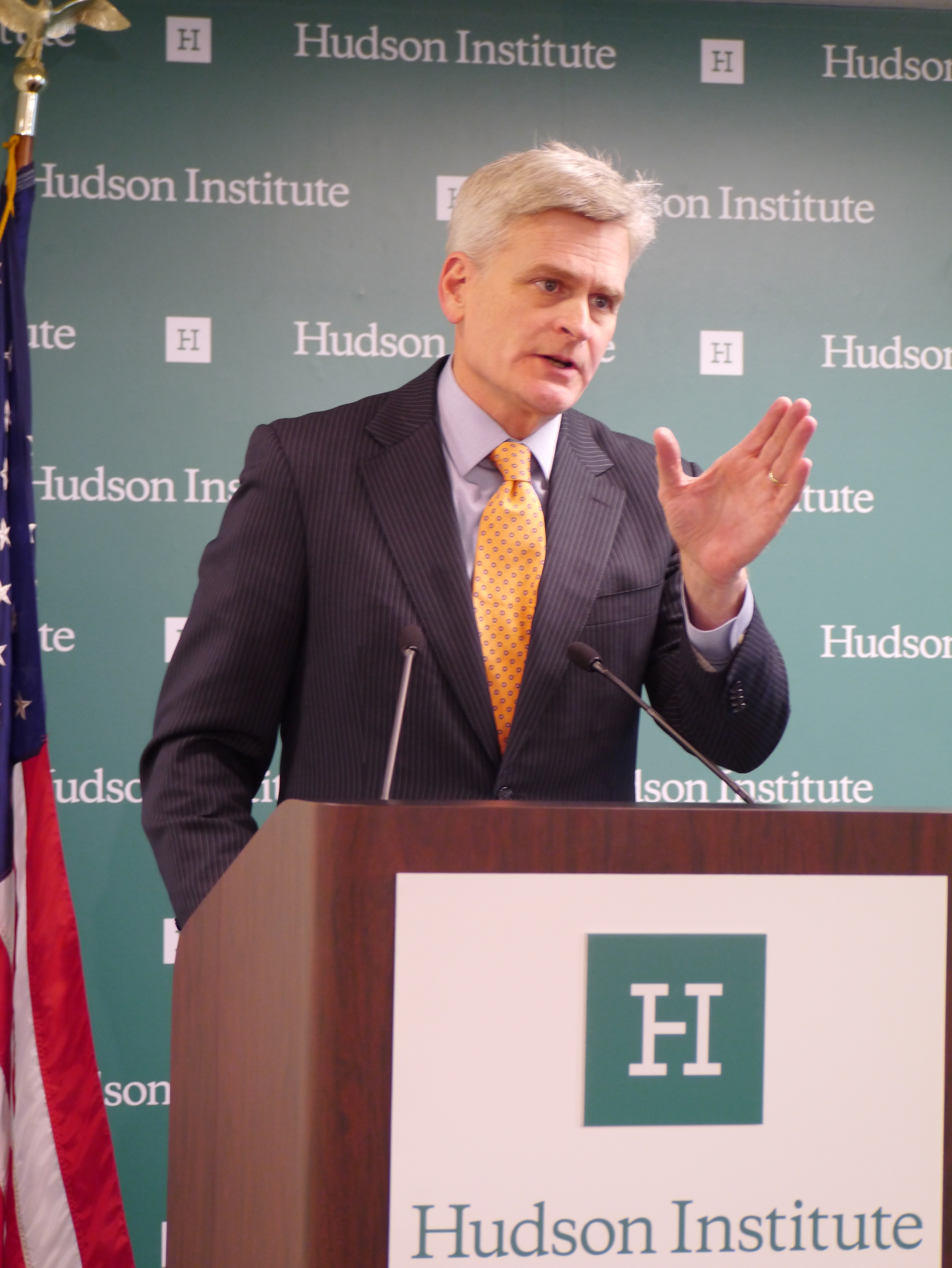
Bill Cassidy at Hudson Institute, May 2015

=== Elections ===
==== 2014 ====
Cassidy ran for the U.S. Senate in the 2014 election, in which he was endorsed by Republican Senator David Vitter.

He defeated incumbent Democratic Senator Mary Landrieu in a runoff election, receiving 56% of the vote to Landrieu's 44%. It was the first Republican victory for the seat since William P. Kellogg in 1883.

==== 2020 ====
Cassidy was reelected in 2020 with 59.32% of the vote.

==== 2026 ====
Parish results Letlow: 30–40%; 40–50%; 50–60%; 60–70%; 70–80%; Fleming: 40–50%; Cassidy: 30–40%; 40–50%; 60–70%

Precinct results Letlow: 30–40%; 40–50%; 50–60%; 60–70%; 70–80%; 80–90%; 90–100%; Fleming: 30–40%; 40–50%; 50–60%; 60–70%; 70–80%; 80–90%; 90–100%; Cassidy: 20–30%; 30–40%; 40–50%; 50–60%; 60–70%; 70–80%; 80–90%; 90–100%; Spencer: 50–60%; 90–100%; No data

Cassidy precinct voteshare Cassidy: 0–10%; 10–20%; 20–30%; 30–40%; 40–50%; 50–60%; 60–70%; 70–80%; 80–90%; 90–100%; 0% No data

Cassidy ran for reelection to the Senate but lost the Republican primary in May 2026, placing third. It was the worst primary performance for a non-appointed senator since 1946.

=== Tenure ===
==== 115th Congress ====
On May 8, 2017, Cassidy appeared on Jimmy Kimmel Live! and discussed healthcare in the United States. He said that any legislation that he would support must meet the "Jimmy Kimmel test", namely: "Would a child born with congenital heart disease be able to get everything he or she would need in that first year of life?" Kimmel had earlier chastised Republicans for voting to repeal the Affordable Care Act and replace it with legislation that would not ensure protection for children such as his newborn, who was born with a heart defect that required immediate surgery.

In September 2017, Cassidy and Lindsey Graham introduced legislation to repeal and replace the Affordable Care Act. The "Graham–Cassidy" bill would eliminate the ACA's marketplace subsidies, repeal the ACA's Medicaid expansion, and introduce a temporary block grant that would expire in 2026. The legislation would also impose a per-enrollee cap on Medicaid funding. The Kaiser Family Foundation noted that the legislation "would fundamentally alter the current federal approach to financing health coverage for more than 80 million people who have coverage through the ACA (Medicaid expansion or marketplace) or through the traditional Medicaid program." An analysis by the Center on Budget and Policy Priorities found that the legislation "would cut federal health care funding by $299 billion relative to current law" in the year 2027 alone and estimated that it would leave 32 million more Americans without health insurance. President Donald Trump endorsed the bill.

The bill does not meet the "Jimmy Kimmel test", as it would allow states to eliminate requirements to cover children with conditions like that of Kimmel's child. Kimmel condemned Cassidy, calling him a liar, listed the health organizations that opposed Graham–Cassidy, and urged his viewers to contact their congressional representatives about the legislation. Cassidy responded that Kimmel did not understand the legislation. Cassidy also said that under Graham–Cassidy, "more people will have coverage" than under the Affordable Care Act. According to The Washington Post's fact checker, Cassidy "provided little evidence to support his claim of more coverage ... the consensus [among health care analysts] is that his funding formula makes his claim all but impossible to achieve."

==== 116th Congress ====
On February 5, 2020, Cassidy joined all Republican senators except Mitt Romney in voting to acquit Trump on both articles of impeachment in his first impeachment trial.

==== 117th Congress ====
Cassidy was in attendance during the 2021 United States Electoral College vote count when Trump supporters stormed the United States Capitol. He tweeted during the attack, calling them "hooligans" and the storming "un-American." He later said the participants were guilty of sedition "and should be prosecuted as such." When the Capitol was secured and Congress resumed, Cassidy voted to certify the results of the 2020 presidential election.

Cassidy was one of seven Republican senators to vote to convict Trump of incitement of insurrection in his second impeachment trial. Hours after the vote, the Republican Party of Louisiana censured him. Cassidy was praised by several Democrats, including his predecessor Mary Landrieu.

On May 27, 2021, along with five other Republicans and all Democrats, Cassidy voted to establish a bipartisan commission to investigate the January 6 storming of the U.S. Capitol. The vote fell short of the 60 required "yes" votes.

In 2023, after Trump was indicted for mishandling classified documents, Cassidy called for Trump to drop out of the 2024 presidential election. When Trump won the Republican nomination, Cassidy declined to endorse him.

==== 118th Congress ====
During the 118th Congress (2023–2025), Cassidy became the ranking member of the Senate HELP Committee. In this capacity, he worked with committee chairman Bernie Sanders to pass bipartisan legislation aimed at lowering prescription drug costs and reforming PBMs. He also continued his legislative focus on mental health, co-sponsoring bills to improve access to care. Cassidy reiterated some of his criticisms of Trump in March 2024, but also defended him against media critics and said he would vote Republican for president.

==== 119th Congress ====
Cassidy began his tenure in the 119th Congress in January 2025 as chair of the Senate HELP Committee. In his opening remarks as chair, he outlined his priorities, including addressing declining child literacy, improving support for dyslexia, examining antisemitism on college campuses, and reforming the federal retirement system.

In February 2026, Cassidy released a report detailing ways that Congress and the Executive Branch could repeal the FDA, but did not actually legislate on any of the report's recommendations.

In August 2026, Cassidy announced that he would cast the deciding vote to confirm Todd Blanche as U.S. Attorney General, saying: "I'll be criticized for this. What's new?"

=== Committee assignments ===
- Committee on Energy and Natural Resources
  - Subcommittee on Energy
  - Subcommittee on Public Lands, Forests and Mining
  - Subcommittee on Water and Power
- Committee on Finance
  - Subcommittee on Health Care
  - Subcommittee on International Trade, Customs, and Global Competitiveness
  - Subcommittee on Social Security, Pensions, and Family Policy
- Committee on Health, Education, Labor, and Pensions (Chair)
  - Subcommittee on Children and Families
  - Subcommittee on Employment and Workplace Safety
  - Subcommittee on Primary Health and Retirement Security
- Committee on Veterans' Affairs

=== Caucuses ===
- Senate Republican Conference

== Political positions ==
Cassidy is regarded as a moderate Republican.

=== Abortion ===
Cassidy opposes abortion after 20 weeks and any federal funding for abortion. He supported the 2022 overturning of Roe v. Wade, calling it a decision that "recognizes that an unborn child has a right to life". Also in 2022, Cassidy said Louisiana's maternal mortality rate was among the nation's highest because "About a third of our population is African American; African Americans have a higher incidence of maternal mortality. So if you correct our population for race, we're not as much of an outlier as it'd otherwise appear".

=== Agriculture ===
In July 2019, Cassidy was one of eight senators to introduce the Agricultural Trucking Relief Act, a bill that would alter the definition of an agricultural commodity to include both horticultural and aquacultural products and promote greater consistency in regulation by federal and state agencies as part of an attempt to ease regulatory burdens on trucking and the agri-community.

=== Carbon tariff ===
In November 2023, Cassidy and Lindsey Graham co-sponsored the Foreign Pollution Fee Act. Endorsed by the Sierra Club, the bill (S. 3198; referred to the Senate Finance Committee) proposed a carbon tariff on energy and industrial imports based on the good's emission intensity or carbon footprint as compared with the same domestic good to impose a carbon price on goods from countries with greater greenhouse gas emissions than the United States.

=== Defense ===
In July 2019 Cassidy was one of 16 Republican senators to send Acting Office of Management and Budget (OMB) Director Russell Vought, Acting White House Chief of Staff Mick Mulvaney, and Treasury Secretary Steven Mnuchin a letter encouraging them to work with them to prevent a continuing resolution "for FY 2020 that would delay the implementation of the President’s National Defense Strategy (NDS) and increase costs" and arguing that the yearlong continuing resolution administration officials favored would render the Defense Department "incapable of increasing readiness, recapitalizing our force, or rationalizing funding to align with the National Defense Strategy (NDS)."

=== Fiscal Responsibility Act of 2023 ===
Cassidy was among the 31 Senate Republicans who voted against final passage of the Fiscal Responsibility Act of 2023.

=== Foreign policy ===
In October 2023, Cassidy visited China as part of a bipartisan congressional delegation led by Senate Majority Leader Chuck Schumer and met with General Secretary of the Chinese Communist Party Xi Jinping. The delegation also met Director of the Office of the Central Foreign Affairs Commission Wang Yi, Chairman of the Standing Committee of the National People's Congress Zhao Leji, and Shanghai Communist Party Secretary Chen Jining.

In January 2024, Cassidy voted against a resolution proposed by Senator Bernie Sanders to apply the human rights provisions of the Foreign Assistance Act to U.S. aid to Israel's military. The proposal was defeated, 72 to 11.

Cassidy has been critical of the Islamabad Memorandum, calling it the "worst foreign policy blunder in decades".

=== Gun law ===
Cassidy opposes gun control as a matter of principle.

In January 2019, Cassidy was one of 31 Republican senators to cosponsor the Constitutional Concealed Carry Reciprocity Act, a bill introduced by John Cornyn and Ted Cruz that would allow people with concealed-carry privileges in their home state to exercise this right in any other state with concealed-carry laws while concurrently abiding by that state's laws.

In May 2022, after the Robb Elementary School shooting, Cassidy reaffirmed his opposition to banning any kind of guns, including the AR-15. At the same time, during a live video discussion on youth mental health hosted by The Washington Post, he said he was "open to some discussions on ways to prevent shootings", such as red-flag laws and expanded background checks. Cassidy later became one of ten Republican senators to support a bipartisan agreement on gun control, which included a red flag provision, a support for state crisis intervention orders, funding for school safety resources, stronger background checks for buyers under the age of 21, and penalties for straw purchases, and was one of 15 Republican senators to vote for the Bipartisan Safer Communities Act, which President Biden later signed.

=== Social Security ===
Cassidy supports lengthening the solvency of Social Security, which is scheduled to run out of money to pay all beneficiaries by 2034. In 2021, he and Senator Angus King proposed creating a $1.5 trillion investment fund managed independently of Congress to fund 75% of the Social Security trust fund's liabilities. Cassidy has criticized both Biden's and Trump's views on Social Security.

=== Taxes ===
In 2019, along with Democrats Amy Klobuchar and Doug Jones and Republican Pat Toomey, Cassidy was a lead sponsor of the Gold Star Family Tax Relief Act, a bill that would undo a provision in the Tax Cuts and Jobs Act that raised the tax on the benefit children receive from a parent's Department of Defense survivor benefits plan to 37% from an average of 12% to 15% before the 2017 law. The bill passed in the Senate in May 2019.

On July 30, 2019, Cassidy and Senator Kyrsten Sinema released a proposal under which new parents would be authorized to advance their child tax credit benefits in order to receive a $5,000 cash benefit upon either birth or adoption of a child. The parents' child tax credit would then be reduced by $500 for each year of the following decade. The senators described their proposal as the first bipartisan paid parental leave plan.

=== Vaccinations ===
As a physician described as a "lifelong advocate for vaccines", Cassidy was seen as a swing vote on the Senate Finance Panel for the confirmation of anti-vaccine advocate Robert F. Kennedy Jr. as Secretary of Health and Human Services. During the confirmation hearings in January 2025, Cassidy pressed Kennedy over his opposition to childhood vaccinations and refusal to denounce the discredited theory that vaccines cause autism. Cassidy said he struggled to decide whether to vote to confirm Kennedy because of his ethics as a doctor ("dedicating my life to saving lives"). But after pressure from Republican leaders, he voted to advance Kennedy's nomination from the Senate Finance Committee to the full Senate for confirmation.

Cassidy said he received "commitments" from Kennedy to meet with Cassidy several times a month, give advance notice to Congress if he imposes any changes to vaccine safety monitoring, and not to have the CDC remove from its website statements that vaccines do not cause autism. During the confirmation hearings, Kennedy also promised Cassidy that he would not change the U.S. vaccination schedule. But less than a week after taking office, Kennedy announced he would convene a panel to examine the vaccination schedule. The site was then altered in a way that does not reflect the scientific consensus that the vaccines do not cause autism. The CDC then announced plans to investigate debunked claims of a link between autism and the measles vaccine. Cassidy called this a waste of money. In August 2026, Kennedy accompanied Trump as he issued an executive order for the CDC to make changes to the childhood MMR vaccine schedule. The order is not legally binding, and Cassidy called it "crazy, stupid", saying, "So the president is wrong; there's a lot of bad things that will come out of this."

== Personal life ==
Cassidy's wife, Laura (née Layden), is also a physician. They met during their respective residencies in Los Angeles and married on September 29, 1989. In the early 1990s, both worked at the Earl K. Long Medical Center, where Laura was the hospital's head of surgery. Cassidy worked as a gastroenterologist at the facility until it closed in 2013. They have three children. They are members of The Chapel on the Campus, a nondenominational Christian church that meets on LSU's campus in Baton Rouge.

== Electoral history ==
=== Louisiana State Senate ===
Louisiana State Senate, District 16 (2006)
Party	Candidate	Votes	%
Republican	Bill Cassidy	8,394	58.06
Republican	William Daniel	5,472	37.85
Libertarian	S.B.A. Zaitoon	592	4.09
Total votes		14,458	100.00
Republican hold			

Louisiana State Senate, District 16 (2007)
Party	Candidate	Votes	%
Republican	Bill Cassidy (incumbent)	33,463	75.64
Republican	Troy "Rocco" Moreau	6,781	15.33
Libertarian	Richard Fontanesi	3,995	9.03
Total votes		44,239	100.00
Republican hold			

=== U.S. House of Representatives ===
U.S. House of Representatives, 6th District of Louisiana (2008)
Party	Candidate	Votes	%
Republican	Bill Cassidy	150,332	48.12
Democratic	Don Cazayoux (incumbent)	125,886	40.29
No Party	Michael L. Jackson	36,198	11.59
Total votes		312,416	100.00
Republican gain from Democratic			

U.S. House of Representatives, 6th District of Louisiana (2010)
Party	Candidate	Votes	%
Republican	Bill Cassidy (incumbent)	138,607	65.63
Democratic	Merritt E. McDonald, Sr.	72,577	34.37
Total votes		211,184	100.00
Republican hold			

U.S. House of Representatives, 6th District of Louisiana (2012)
Party	Candidate	Votes	%
Republican	Bill Cassidy (incumbent)	243,553	79.41
Libertarian	Rufus Holt Craig, Jr	32,185	10.49
No Party	Richard "RPT" Torregano	30,975	10.10
Total votes		306,713	100.00
Republican hold			

=== U.S. Senate ===
United States Senate, Louisiana (2014)
Primary election
Party	Candidate	Votes	%
Democratic	Mary Landrieu (incumbent)	619,402	42.08
Republican	Bill Cassidy	603,048	40.97
Republican	Rob Maness	202,556	13.76
Republican	Thomas Clements	14,173	0.96
Libertarian	Brannon McMorris	13,034	0.89
Democratic	Wayne Ables	11,323	0.77
Democratic	William Waymire	4,673	0.32
Democratic	Vallian Senegal	3,835	0.26
Total votes		1,473,826	100.00
General election
Republican	Bill Cassidy	712,379	55.93
Democratic	Mary Landrieu (incumbent)	561,210	44.07
Total votes		1,273,589	100.00
Republican gain from Democratic			

United States Senate, Louisiana (2020)
Party	Candidate	Votes	%
Republican	Bill Cassidy (incumbent)	1,228,908	59.32
Democratic	Adrian Perkins	394,049	19.02
Democratic	Derrick Edwards	229,814	11.09
Democratic	Antoine Pierce	55,710	2.69
Republican	Dustin Murphy	38,383	1.85
Democratic	Drew Knight	36,962	1.78
Independent	Beryl Billiot	17,362	0.84
Independent	John Paul Bourgeois	16,518	0.80
Democratic	Peter Wenstrup	14,454	0.70
Libertarian	Aaron Sigler	11,321	0.55
Independent	M.V. "Vinny" Mendoza	7,811	0.38
Independent	Melinda Mary Price	7,680	0.37
Independent	Jamar Montgomery	5,804	0.28
Independent	Reno Jean Daret III	3,954	0.19
Independent	Alexander "Xan" John	2,813	0.14
Total votes		2,071,543	100.00
Republican hold			

United States Senate primary, Louisiana (2026)
Party	Candidate	Votes	%
Republican	Julia Letlow	179,876	44.8
Republican	John Fleming	113,428	28.3
Republican	Bill Cassidy (incumbent)	99,479	24.8
Republican	Mark Spencer	8,335	2.1
Total votes		401,118	100.0

== See also ==
- Physicians in the United States Congress

== Notes ==
U.S. House of Representatives
Preceded by Don Cazayoux	Member of the U.S. House of Representatives from Louisiana's 6th congressional district 2009–2015	Succeeded by Garret Graves
Party political offices
Preceded by John Kennedy	Republican nominee for U.S. Senator from Louisiana (Class 2); 2014, 2020	Succeeded by Julia Letlow
U.S. Senate
Preceded by Mary Landrieu	U.S. Senator (Class 2) from Louisiana; 2015–present Served alongside: David Vitter, John Kennedy	Incumbent
Preceded by Richard Burr	Ranking Member of the Senate Health, Education, Labor and Pensions Committee; 2023–2025	Succeeded by Bernie Sanders
Preceded by Bernie Sanders	Chair of the Senate Health, Education, Labor and Pensions Committee; 2025–present	Incumbent
U.S. order of precedence (ceremonial)
Preceded by Thom Tillis	Order of precedence of the United States as United States Senator	Succeeded by Tom Cotton
Preceded by Gary Peters	United States senators by seniority 48th	Succeeded by James Lankford
