= Employee Health Care Protection Act of 2013 =

Proposed United States law

- Long title: To authorize health insurance issuers to continue to offer for sale current group health insurance coverage in satisfaction of the minimum essential health insurance coverage requirement, and for other purposes.
- Announced in: the 113th United States Congress
- Sponsored by: Rep. Bill Cassidy (R, LA-6)
- Number of co-sponsors: 0

Codification
- Acts affected: Patient Protection and Affordable Care Act, Health Care and Education Reconciliation Act of 2010
- U.S.C. sections affected: 42 U.S.C. § 18041, 42 U.S.C. § 18031

Legislative history
- Introduced in the House as H.R. 3522 by Rep. Bill Cassidy (R, LA-6) on November 18, 2013; Committee consideration by United States House Committee on Energy and Commerce, United States House Committee on Ways and Means, United States House Energy Subcommittee on Health; Passed the House on September 11, 2014 (Roll Call Vote 495: 247-167)

The Employee Health Care Protection Act of 2013 (H.R. 3522) is a bill that would permit a health insurance issuer that has in effect health insurance coverage in the group market on any date during 2013 to continue offering such coverage for sale during 2014 outside of a health care exchange established under the Patient Protection and Affordable Care Act.

The bill was introduced into the United States House of Representatives during the 113th United States Congress.

== Background ==
President Barack Obama, when arguing in favor of healthcare reform and talking about his signature legislation, the Affordable Care Act (ACA), Obama often said that "if you like your plan, you can keep it" in reference to individuals' health insurance plans. However, the ten requirements from the ACA meant that some existing health insurance plans were being forced to be discontinued.

== Provisions of the bill ==
This summary is based largely on the summary provided by the Congressional Research Service, a public domain source.

The Employee Health Care Protection Act of 2013 would permit a health insurance issuer that has in effect health insurance coverage in the group market on any date during 2013 to continue offering such coverage for sale during 2014 outside of a health care exchange established under the Patient Protection and Affordable Care Act. The bill would treat such coverage as a grandfathered health plan for purposes of an individual meeting the requirement to maintain minimum essential health coverage.

== Congressional Budget Office report ==
This summary is based largely on the summary provided by the Congressional Budget Office, as ordered reported by the House Committee on Energy & Commerce on July 30, 2014, with modifications reflected in Rules Committee Print 113-56 and an amendment (HR3522-RCP-AMD_01.XML) posted on the website of the Committee on Rules on September 8, 2014. This is a public domain source.

H.R. 3522, as amended, would allow insurers to offer group health insurance plans that they offered on any date during 2013 until December 31, 2018, regardless of whether the coverage they provide complies with the market and benefit rules that took effect on January 1, 2014, under the Affordable Care Act (ACA). Groups would be allowed to enroll in such plans even if they had not previously been covered by them, and people enrolled in those plans would be considered to be in compliance with the individual mandate imposed by the ACA, which requires most residents of the United States to have “minimum essential coverage” (as defined in that act) beginning in 2014. However, insurers would not be allowed to offer such coverage through health insurance exchanges.

The Congressional Budget Office (CBO) and the staff of the Joint Committee on Taxation estimate that enacting H.R. 3522 would increase federal revenues by a total of $1.25 billion over the fiscal years 2015 to 2024. About $400 million of that increase in revenues would be off-budget (Social Security payroll tax collections are classified as off-budget).

Pay-as-you-go procedures apply to H.R. 3522 because enacting the legislation would affect revenues. H.R. 3522 contains no intergovernmental or private-sector mandates as defined in the Unfunded Mandates Reform Act.

== Procedural history ==
The Employee Health Care Protection Act of 2013 was introduced into the United States House of Representatives on November 18, 2013 by Rep. Bill Cassidy (R, LA-6). It was referred to the United States House Committee on Energy and Commerce, the United States House Committee on Ways and Means, and the United States House Energy Subcommittee on Health. On September 8, 2014 the Committee reported the bill alongside House Report 113-580. The House voted on September 11, 2014 in Roll Call Vote 495 to pass the bill 247-167. There were twenty-five Democrats who voted in favor of the bill.

President Barack Obama released a Statement of Administration Policy announcing that "if the President were presented with H.R. 3522, he would veto it."

== Debate and discussion ==
Rep. Cassidy, who sponsored the bill, said that the "legislation is about keeping a promise and doing right by the American people." Cassidy said that they should "keep the promise to middle class workers and ensure that if they like their healthcare plan, they can keep it."

Opponents, such as Rep. Frank Pallone (D-NJ), argued that "this bill is nothing more than another political attack on the Affordable Care Act."

The Congressional Budget Office estimated that at least 2 million people would probably sign up for the health insurance plans that would once again be legal if this bill were to pass.

== See also ==
- List of bills in the 113th United States Congress
