= An act to repeal the Patient Protection and Affordable Care Act =

- Long title: To repeal the Patient Protection and Affordable Care Act and health care-related provisions in the Health Care and Education Reconciliation Act of 2010.
- Announced in: the 113th United States Congress
- Sponsored by: Rep. Michele Bachmann (R, MN-6)
- Number of co-sponsors: 0

Codification
- Acts affected: Patient Protection and Affordable Care Act, Social Security Act, Health Care and Education Reconciliation Act of 2010, Statutory Pay-As-You-Go Act of 2010

Legislative history
- Introduced in the House as H.R. 45 by Rep. Michele Bachmann (R-MN) on January 3, 2013; Committee consideration by United States House Committee on Energy and Commerce, United States House Energy Subcommittee on Health, United States House Committee on Education and the Workforce, United States House Education Subcommittee on Health, Employment, Labor, and Pensions, United States House Committee on Ways and Means, United States House Ways and Means Subcommittee on Health, United States House Committee on the Judiciary, United States House Committee on Natural Resources, United States House Natural Resources Subcommittee on Indian and Alaska Native Affairs, United States House Committee on Rules, United States House Committee on House Administration, United States House Committee on the Budget, United States House Committee on Appropriations

The bill H.R. 45 (H.R. 45) (long title: To repeal the Patient Protection and Affordable Care Act and health care-related provisions in the Health Care and Education Reconciliation Act of 2010) is a bill that was introduced into the United States House of Representatives in the 113th United States Congress. If enacted, the bill would repeal the Patient Protection and Affordable Care Act and the Health Care and Education Reconciliation Act of 2010, commonly referred to as Obamacare.

== Provisions/Elements of the bill ==
The official text of H.R. 45 as it was introduced into the United States House of Representatives in the 113th United States Congress.

This summary is based largely on the summary provided by the Congressional Research Service, a public domain source.

H.R. 45 would repeal the Patient Protection and Affordable Care Act (Pub. L. 111–148 (text) (PDF)), effective as of its enactment. H.R. 45 would restore the provisions of law that had been amended by the Patient Protection and Affordable Care Act.

The bill would also repeal the health care provisions of the Health Care and Education Reconciliation Act of 2010 (Pub. L. 111–152 (text) (PDF), 124 Stat. 1029), effective as of the Act's enactment. It would restore provisions of law amended by the Health Care and Education and Reconciliation Act of 2010's health care provisions.

== Procedural history ==
The bill H.R. 45 was introduced into the House by Rep. Michele Bachmann (R-MN) on January 3, 2013. It was referred to multiple House committees and subcommittees, including the United States House Committee on Energy and Commerce, the United States House Energy Subcommittee on Health, the United States House Committee on Education and the Workforce, the United States House Education Subcommittee on Health, Employment, Labor, and Pensions, the United States House Committee on Ways and Means, the United States House Ways and Means Subcommittee on Health, the United States House Committee on the Judiciary, the United States House Committee on Natural Resources, the United States House Natural Resources Subcommittee on Indian and Alaska Native Affairs, the United States House Committee on Rules, the United States House Committee on House Administration, the United States House Committee on the Budget, and the United States House Committee on Appropriations.

The House Majority Leader Eric Cantor announced on Friday May 10, 2013 that H.R. 1580 would be considered the following week.

As of May 15, 2013, H.R. 45 had 123 co-sponsors, all of them Republicans.

== See also ==
- Efforts to repeal the Patient Protection and Affordable Care Act
- Health Care and Education Reconciliation Act of 2010
- List of bills in the 113th United States Congress
