= Energy Consumers Relief Act of 2013 =

- Long title: To protect consumers by prohibiting the Administrator of the Environmental Protection Agency from promulgating as final certain energy-related rules that are estimated to cost more than $1 billion and will cause significant adverse effects to the economy.
- Announced in: the 113th United States Congress
- Sponsored by: Rep. Bill Cassidy (R, LA-6)
- Number of co-sponsors: 0

Codification
- U.S.C. sections affected: 5 U.S.C. § 551,
- Agencies affected: United States Congress, Office of Management and Budget, United States Department of Commerce, United States Department of Labor, United States Environmental Protection Agency, Small Business Administration, United States Department of Energy, Energy Information Administration, Federal Energy Regulatory Commission,

Legislative history
- Introduced in the House as H.R. 1582 by Rep. Bill Cassidy (R, LA-6) on April 16, 2013; Committee consideration by United States House Committee on Energy and Commerce, United States House Energy Subcommittee on Energy and Power

The Energy Consumers Relief Act of 2013 (H.R. 1582) is a bill that would require the Environmental Protection Agency (EPA) to submit reports to both the United States Congress and the United States Department of Energy whenever it tried to implement a new regulation that would have significant compliance costs (an impact of over $1 billion). The Department of Energy and Congress would then have the option of stopping or altering what the EPA proposed to do. According to a report about the bill from the United States House Committee on Energy and Commerce, the bill "provides for greater checks and balances over EPA's rulemaking activity by requiring, before the agency finalizes new energy-related rules estimated to cost more than $1 billion, that the agency submit a report to Congress providing information detailing certain cost, benefit, energy price, and job impacts, and also that the Secretary of Energy, in consultation with other relevant agencies, conduct a review of the energy price, reliability, and other energy-related impacts, and make a determination about whether the rule will cause significant adverse effects to the economy." The bill was introduced into the United States House of Representatives during the 113th United States Congress.

== Background ==
According to the committee report, "since 2009, EPA has proposed or finalized thousands of pages of new regulations imposing billions of dollars cumulatively in new compliance costs across the economy. These regulations include new rules that affect the production, supply, distribution, or use of energy and may impose annual compliance costs that continue over a period of years or even of decades." This bill was written as a reaction to this situation.

== Provisions of the bill ==
This summary is based largely on the summary provided by the Congressional Research Service, a public domain source.

The Energy Consumers Relief Act of 2013 would require the Administrator of the United States Environmental Protection Agency (EPA), before promulgating a final rule that regulates any aspect of the production, supply, distribution, or use of energy (or that provides for such regulation by state or local governments) and that is estimated by the Administrator or the Director of the Office of Management and Budget (OMB) to impose aggregate costs of more than $1 billion, to submit a report that contains: (1) an estimate of the total costs of the rule, (2) an estimate of the increases in energy prices that may result from implementation or enforcement of the rule, and (3) a detailed description of the employment effects that may result from implementation or enforcement of the rule.

The bill would also require the United States Department of Energy (DOE): (1) to prepare an independent analysis to determine whether such rule will cause any increase in energy prices for consumers, any impact on fuel diversity of the nation's electricity generation portfolio or on electric reliability, or any other adverse effect on energy supply, distribution, or use; and (2) upon making such a determination, to determine whether such increase, impact, or effect will cause significant adverse effects to the economy and publish such determination in the Federal Register.

Most significantly, the bill would prohibit the Environmental Protection Agency from promulgating any such final rule if the Department of Energy determines that such rule will cause significant adverse effects to the economy.

== Congressional Budget office report ==
The Energy Consumers Relief Act of 2013 would require that before the Environmental Protection Agency (EPA) finalizes any energy-related rule with an estimated regulatory cost of more than $1 billion, including indirect costs, EPA must submit a report to the United States Congress detailing the rule's potential costs and other impacts on jobs and gasoline prices. The legislation also would require the Department of Energy (DOE), in consultation with other agencies, to prepare an independent analysis of those rules to determine if they would adversely affect the economy. EPA would be prohibited from finalizing any rule that DOE determines would have significant adverse effects to the economy.

The Congressional Budget Office (CBO) estimates that implementing H.R. 1582 would cost $35 million over the 2014-2018 period, assuming appropriation of the necessary amounts. Enacting H.R. 1582 would not affect direct spending or revenues; therefore, pay-as-you-go procedures do not apply.

The CBO's estimate is based on information from EPA about the anticipated number of energy-related rules that would be subject to the requirements under this bill over the next five years. The CBO estimates that implementing H.R. 1582 would not have a significant impact on spending by EPA because most of the analysis that it would need to complete under H.R. 1582 will already be conducted to meet similar reporting requirements under existing Executive Orders. The CBO estimates, however, that the DOE would need additional appropriations of about $7 million annually to meet new and expanded reporting requirements under H.R. 1582. Those costs would cover staff and support costs for about five studies per year that would be similar in scope to recent DOE analyses of proposed energy legislation. That estimate is based on information from the Energy Information Administration, the organization within DOE that would be responsible for completing the analyses and reports.

H.R. 1582 contains no intergovernmental or private-sector mandates as defined in the Unfunded Mandates Reform Act and would impose no costs on state, local, or tribal governments.

== Procedural history ==
The Energy Consumers Relief Act of 2013 was introduced in the House by Rep. Bill Cassidy (R, LA-6) on April 16, 2013. It was referred to the United States House Committee on Energy and Commerce and the United States House Energy Subcommittee on Energy and Power. The Subcommittee held Consideration and Mark-up Sessions on July 10 and July 11, 2013, before forwarding the bill to the full Committee. The House Committee on Energy and Commerce held Consideration and Mark-up Sessions on July 16, and July 17, 2013. The bill was ordered reported (amended) by a vote of 25–18. It was accompanied by House Report 113-164. On Friday, July 19, 2013, House Majority Leader Eric Cantor announced that H.R. 1582 would be on the schedule for the week of Monday, July 22, 2013.

== Debate and discussion ==
Supporters of the bill see it as a way to limit the power the EPA has to enact regulations that would hurt the economy.

Opponents of the bill, writing in its committee report, argued that bill gives the Secretary of Energy too much power to veto EPA rules and duplicates an existing regulatory review process that is already being used. Critics also argued that the bill would be used to prevent important environmental regulations.

== See also ==
- List of bills in the 113th United States Congress
- Energy development
- Energy industry
- Energy economics
