= Efforts to repeal the Affordable Care Act =

Actions against a 2010 US statute

There have been dozens of efforts to repeal the Affordable Care Act (commonly called the ACA or Obamacare), which had been enacted by the 111th United States Congress on March 23, 2010. All efforts to repeal the Affordable Care Act have been led by the Republican Party, whereas the Democratic Party has in unison voted against repeal.

== Background ==
A January 9, 2017, Congressional Research Service report entitled "Legislative Actions to Repeal, Defund, or Delay the Affordable Care Act" noted that Congress has been deeply divided over the ACA since it was passed in 2010. Lawmakers opposed to specific provisions in the ACA or the entire law have repeatedly debated its implementation and considered bills to repeal, defund, delay, or otherwise amend the law. In October 2013, there was a partial shutdown of government operations that lasted over two weeks because of a disagreement between the Democratic-controlled Senate and the Republican-led House over the inclusion of ACA language in the FY2014 temporary spending bill.

== 112th Congress (2011–2012) ==
In 2011, after Republicans gained control of the House of Representatives, one of the first votes held was on a bill titled "Repealing the Job-Killing Health Care Law Act" (H.R. 2), which the House passed 245–189. All Republicans and 3 Democrats voted for repeal. House Democrats proposed an amendment that repeal not take effect until a majority of the Senators and Representatives had opted out of the Federal Employees Health Benefits Program; Republicans voted down the measure. In the Senate, the bill was offered as an amendment to an unrelated bill, but was voted down. President Obama had stated that he would have vetoed the bill even if it had passed both chambers of Congress.

Following the 2012 Supreme Court ruling upholding ACA as constitutional, Republicans held another vote to repeal the law on July 11; the House of Representatives voted with all 244 Republicans and 5 Democrats in favor of repeal, which marked the 33rd partial or whole repeal attempt.

== 113th Congress (2013–2014) ==
In January 2013, Republicans introduced An act to repeal the Patient Protection and Affordable Care Act in the United States House of Representatives.

=== 2013 federal government shutdown ===
Strong partisan disagreement in Congress prevented adjustments to the Act's provisions. However, at least one change, a proposed repeal of a tax on medical devices, has received bipartisan support. Some Congressional Republicans argued against improvements to the law on the grounds they would weaken the arguments for repeal.

Republicans attempted to defund its implementation, and in October 2013, House Republicans refused to fund the federal government unless accompanied with a delay in ACA implementation, after the President unilaterally deferred the employer mandate by one year, which critics claimed he had no power to do. The House passed three versions of a bill funding the government while submitting various versions that would repeal or delay ACA, with the last version delaying enforcement of the individual mandate. The Democratic Senate leadership stated the Senate would only pass a "clean" funding bill without any restrictions on ACA. The government shutdown began on October 1. Senate Republicans threatened to block appointments to relevant agencies, such as the Independent Payment Advisory Board and Centers for Medicare and Medicaid Services.

== 114th Congress (2015–2016) ==
On February 3, 2015, the House of Representatives added its 67th repeal vote to the record (239 to 186). This attempt also failed.

The House passed the Restoring Americans' Healthcare Freedom Reconciliation Act of 2015 on October 23, 2015 under the FY2016 budget reconciliation process, which prevents the possibility of a filibuster in the Senate. The bill would have partially repealed the provisions of the Affordable Care Act, notably the individual and employer mandates as well as the taxes on Cadillac insurance plans. Some conservatives in both the House and Senate opposed the bill because it did not completely repeal the Affordable Care Act, which would have been inconsistent with the rules governing budget reconciliation bills. The bill was the 61st time that the House had voted to fully or partially repeal the Affordable Care Act. The bill also would have removed federal funding for Planned Parenthood for one year. The bill was expected to be vetoed by President Obama should it pass the Senate.

In early December, the Senate passed an amended version of the healthcare reconciliation bill, sending it back to the House. It was passed by the House on January 6, 2016, and vetoed by President Obama on January 8, the sixth veto of his presidency. The House failed to override the President's veto on February on a vote of 241–186, which did not meet the required two-thirds supermajority.

In January 2017, the Congressional Budget Office submitted its report on the estimated impact on insurance coverage and premiums with the repeal of ACA through H.R. 3762, the Restoring Americans' Healthcare Freedom Reconciliation Act of 2015. The report completed with input from the Joint Committee on Taxation estimated that 18 million more people would be uninsured in the first year after the repeal and by 2026, the number would rise to 32 million. For those who are not part of a group plan, premiums would increase by up to 25% in the first year, and by 2026 would double.

== 115th Congress (2017–2018) ==
On January 12, 2017, the Senate voted 51 to 48 to pass an FY2017 budget resolution, S.Con.Res. 3, that contained language allowing the repeal of the ACA through the budget reconciliation process, which disallows a filibuster in the Senate. In spite of efforts during a vote-a-rama (Note: A proceeding in which each amendment was considered and voted upon for about 10 minutes each until all 160 were completed) that continued into the early hours of the morning, the repeal failed.

On January 20, 2017, Donald Trump was sworn in as President of the United States. Trump and many Republicans vowed to repeal and replace Obamacare. President Trump signed an executive order on January 20, 2017, his first day in office, that according to then White House Press Secretary Sean Spicer would "ease the burden of Obamacare as we transition from repeal and replace". Spicer would not elaborate further when asked for more details.

On March 6, 2017, House Republicans announced their replacement for the ACA, the American Health Care Act. The bill was withdrawn on March 24, 2017 after it was certain that the House would fail to garner enough votes to pass it. The result was in-fighting within the Republican Party.

On May 4, 2017, the United States House of Representatives voted to pass the American Health Care Act (and thereby repeal most of the Affordable Care Act) by a narrow margin of 217 to 213, sending the bill to the Senate for deliberation. The Senate indicated they would write their own version of the bill, instead of voting on the House version. On June 22, the Better Care Reconciliation Act of 2017 was unveiled.

On July 25, 2017, the United States Senate voted to proceed to debate on the American Health Care Act. The Senate voted 50–50, largely along party lines with the Republicans for and the Democrats against proceeding, requiring Vice President Pence to cast a tie-breaking vote, which was in favor of the AHCA. Republican Senators Susan Collins of Maine and Lisa Murkowski of Alaska crossed the aisle to vote against the motion. That same day, the Senate held a vote on the Better Care Reconciliation Act. That vote failed, 43-57.

On July 27, 2017, the Health Care Freedom Act, also known as the skinny repeal, was introduced. This bill was defeated, 49–51. All Senate Democrats and independents voted against the bill, as did Sen. Collins, Sen. Murkowski, and Sen. John McCain of Arizona. All other Senate Republicans voted for the bill.

On September 13, 2017, an amendment to the American Health Care Act, commonly known as Graham-Cassidy, was submitted. The bill was sponsored by Lindsey Graham of South Carolina, with Bill Cassidy of Louisiana as a co-sponsor. A spokesman for the Senate Majority Leader Mitch McConnell said that a vote was planned to occur before September 30, which was the deadline to pass bills under budget reconciliation. Rand Paul and John McCain indicated that they would vote against the bill. Ultimately, McConnell announced on September 26 that the Senate would not vote on the Graham-Cassidy bill.

On October 12, 2017, President Donald Trump ended by executive order government subsidies paid to health insurance companies to help pay out-of-pocket costs for low-income people. The Congressional Budget Office estimated that by 2018 this would result in an approximately 20 percent increase in individual insurance premiums as well as result in fewer people being insured.

On November 2, 2017, a bill later known as the Tax Cuts and Jobs Act was introduced by Representative Kevin Brady of Texas. Included in the bill was the move to change the tax penalty for not having health insurance mandated by the Affordable Care Act to zero. Economists said this would lower interest in obtaining health insurance coverage. The bill was signed into law on December 22, 2017 by Donald Trump, with the loss of individual mandate taxation being set to take effect January 1, 2019.

== Vote total summary ==
Below is a summary of number of votes taken in the House of Representatives to repeal the Affordable Care Act either in full or in part through March 2014.

Month	number of votes	running total
January 2011	1	1
February 2011	10	11
March 2011	1	12
April 2011	4	16
May 2011	3	19
August 2011	1	20
October 2011	1	21
November 2011	1	22
December 2011	2	24
February 2012	2	26
March 2012	2	28
April 2012	1	29
May 2012	1	30
June 2012	2	32
July 2012	1	33
December 2012	1	34
January 2013	1	35
March 2013	1	36
May 2013	1	37
July 2013	2	39
August 2013	1	40
September 2013	5	45
October 2013	1	46
November 2013	1	47
January 2014	2	49
March 2014	5	54

The Tuesday, February 2, 2016 vote, with a tally of 241–186, was the 63rd attempt by the House.

After the July 27, 2017 vote on the Health Care Freedom Act, Newsweek "found at least 70 Republican-led attempts to repeal, modify or otherwise curb the Affordable Care Act since its inception as law on March 23, 2010."

== See also ==
- Constitutional challenges to the Patient Protection and Affordable Care Act
