= Graham–Cassidy health care amendment =

Proposed American legislation

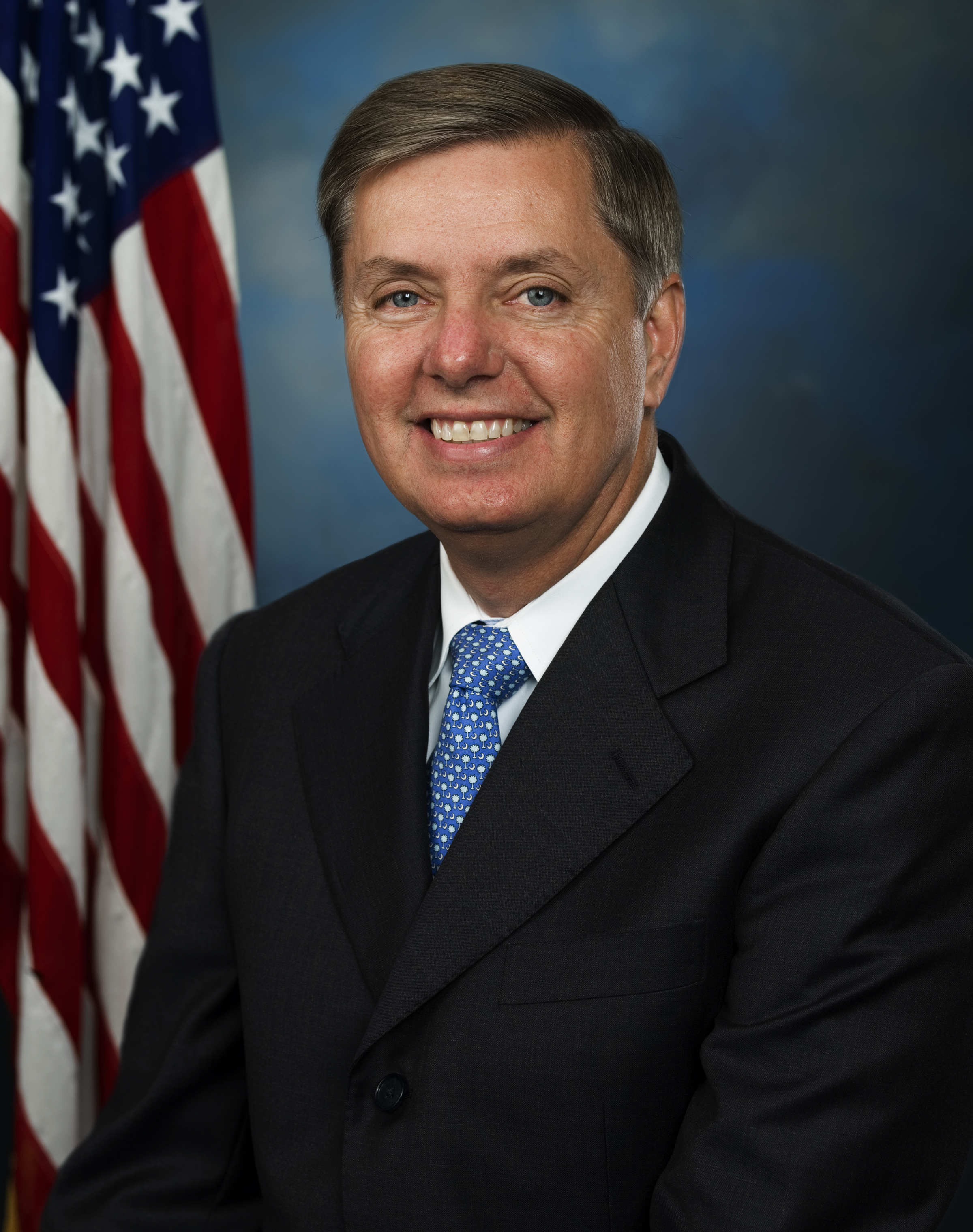
Lindsey Graham

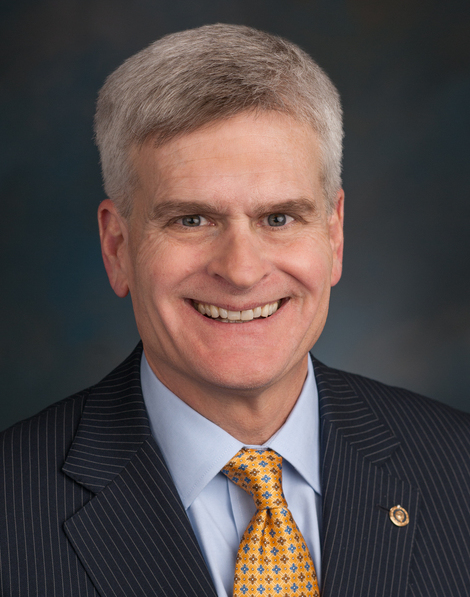
Bill Cassidy

Graham–Cassidy (sometimes written as Cassidy–Graham) or Graham–Cassidy–Heller–Johnson is the common name for Senate Amendment 1030 (S.Amdt. 1030) to the American Health Care Act of 2017 (H.R. 1628). S.Amdt. 1030 was introduced on September 13, 2017, sponsored by Lindsey Graham (R-SC), with Bill Cassidy (R-LA) as a co-sponsor, after whom the amendment is named. The other three co-sponsors are Dean Heller (R-NV), Ron Johnson (R-WI), and Roy Blunt (R-MO). The amendment would repeal the Affordable Care Act (ACA), also known as Obamacare. It would also return control of the Medicaid program to the states and cap the program's funding. The amendment would also redistribute federal money differently to different states, with some states that expanded Medicaid under the ACA (which are generally Democratic) losing federal money to states that did not (which are generally Republican).

In May 2017, late night comedy host Jimmy Kimmel shared with his audience that his son was born with tetralogy of Fallot, a birth defect of the heart. Shortly after, Cassidy began claiming that he wanted any health care bill to pass what he dubbed the "Jimmy Kimmel test," which he defined as "would a child born with congenital heart disease be able to get everything he or she would need in that first year of life?" Most analysts of the bill stated that this bill violated the test, which led Kimmel to condemn it on his show and urge his viewers to contact their representatives to oppose it.

On September 26, 2017, Politico reported that Republican leadership in the Senate had decided not to put the bill up for a floor vote.

== Support for the amendment ==
Several senators were asked to explain why they support the Graham–Cassidy amendment.

- Ted Cruz (R-TX): "... the heart of the legislation takes the policymaking role of Washington and sends it to the states. It lets state innovate and adopt creative solutions to local problems, which vary state by state. [...] And what I think is critical for Obamacare repeal is that we expand consumer freedom so that you, the consumer, can be in charge of what health insurance you want to buy, and we lower premiums so that health insurance is more affordable."
- Chuck Grassley (R-IA): "... Republicans have promised for seven years that we were going to correct all the things that were wrong with Obamacare, and we failed the first eight months. This is the last attempt to do what we promised in the election."
- Jim Inhofe (R-OK): "I think the efficiencies that come with transferring the funding to the states can very well make up the difference between what the federal thing would be. [...] I mean it's more efficient when it's done from the states, and so they can do it with less money."
- Pat Roberts (R-KS): "Look, we're in the back seat of a convertible being driven by Thelma and Louise, and we're headed toward the canyon. [...] So we have to get out of the car, and you have to have a car to get into, and this is the only car there is."

== Opposition to the amendment ==
The New York Times reported that Democratic senators were united in opposition to the Graham–Cassidy amendment.

Senators Rand Paul (R-KY) and John McCain (R-AZ) published statements stating their intention to vote against the bill. McCain's opposition reportedly left Republican leaders with "little hope" of getting the bill passed. Senators Susan Collins (R-ME) and Ted Cruz (R-TX) indicated they are unlikely to support the bill. Cruz speculated that Mike Lee (R-UT) is unlikely to vote for the bill. On September 25, 2017, Collins officially came out in opposition to the bill, effectively eliminating any chance of it passing the Senate.

Groups opposing the bill include the Blue Cross Blue Shield Association, America’s Health Insurance Plans, American Medical Association, American Hospital Association, AARP, American Cancer Society, ALS Association, American Diabetes Association, American Heart Association, American Lung Association, Arthritis Foundation, Cystic Fibrosis Foundation, Family Voices, JDRF, Lutheran Services in America, March of Dimes, National Health Council, National Multiple Sclerosis Society, National Organization for Rare Disorders, Volunteers of America, and WomenHeart.

Sampling some of the opposition points, AARP said that the bill was bad for older adults and people with preexisting conditions, that "[the bill] would undermine critical consumer protections, making health insurance coverage unaffordable and denying people with health conditions the care they need" and that older Americans' annual costs could rise by $16,000.
