= List of countries by greenhouse gas emissions =

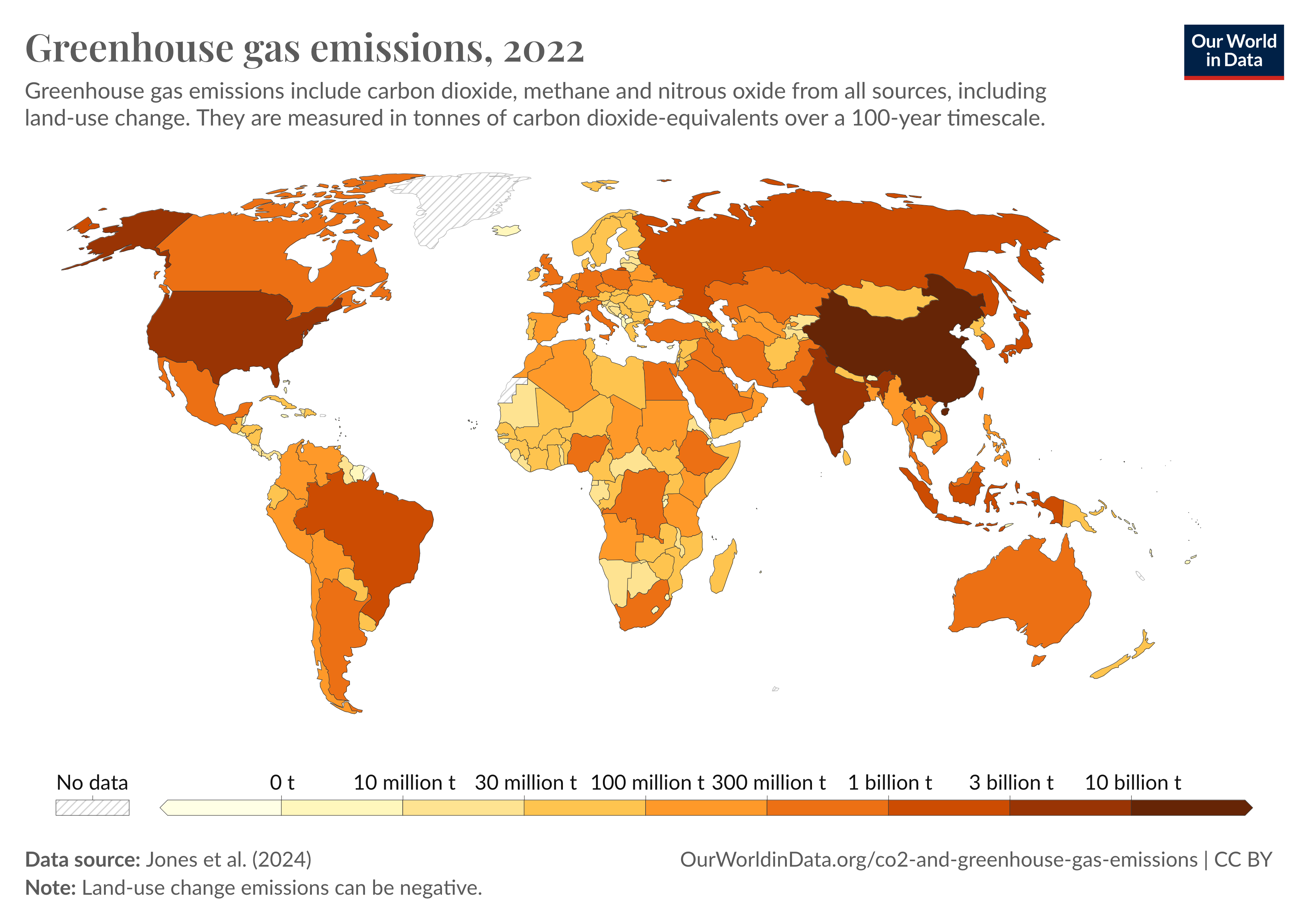
Global map of greenhouse gas (GHG) emissions, including agriculture and land use change, measured in carbon dioxide-equivalents over a 100-year timescale.

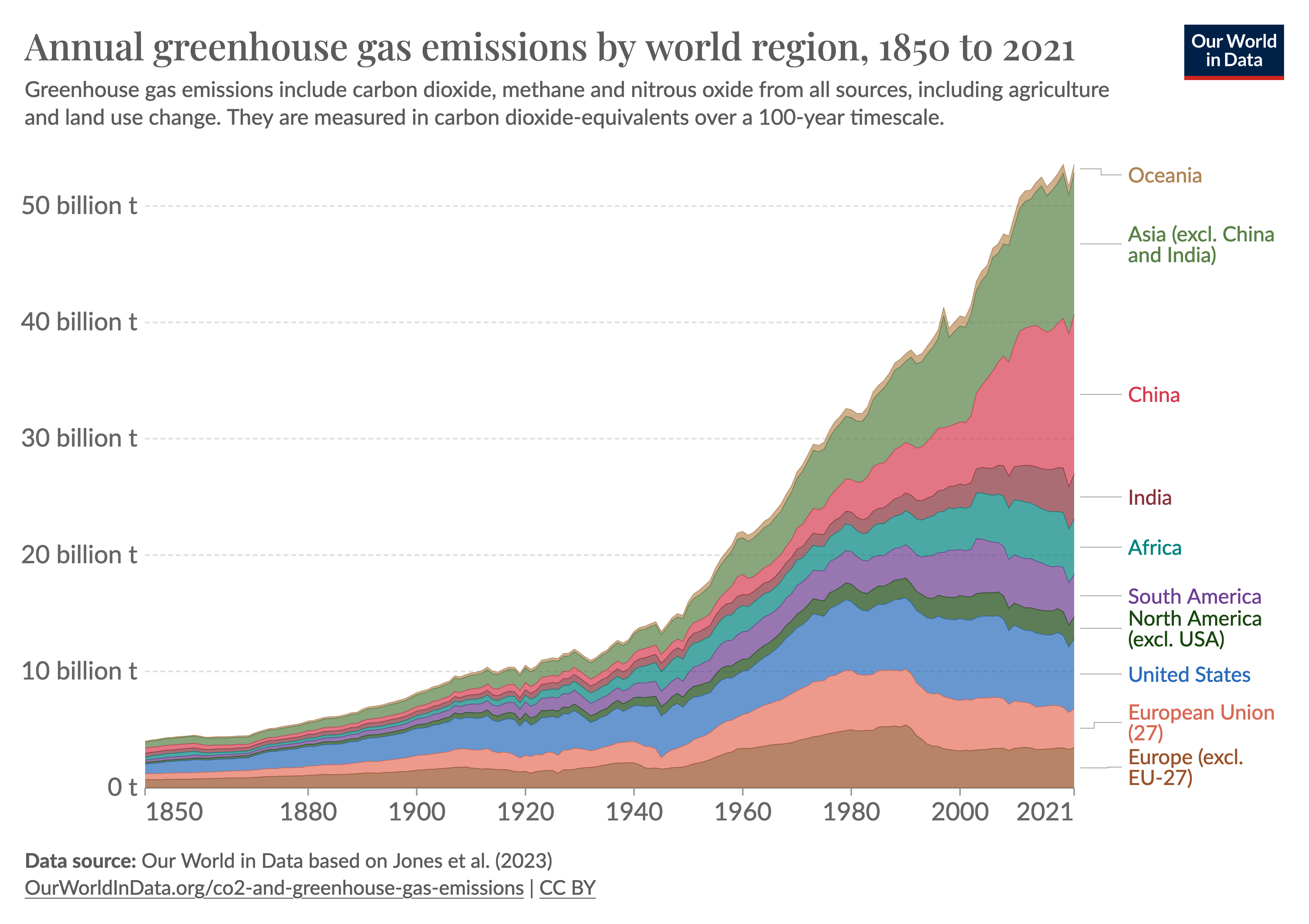
Annual GHG emissions by region, including agriculture and land use change, measured in carbon dioxide-equivalents over a 100-year timescale

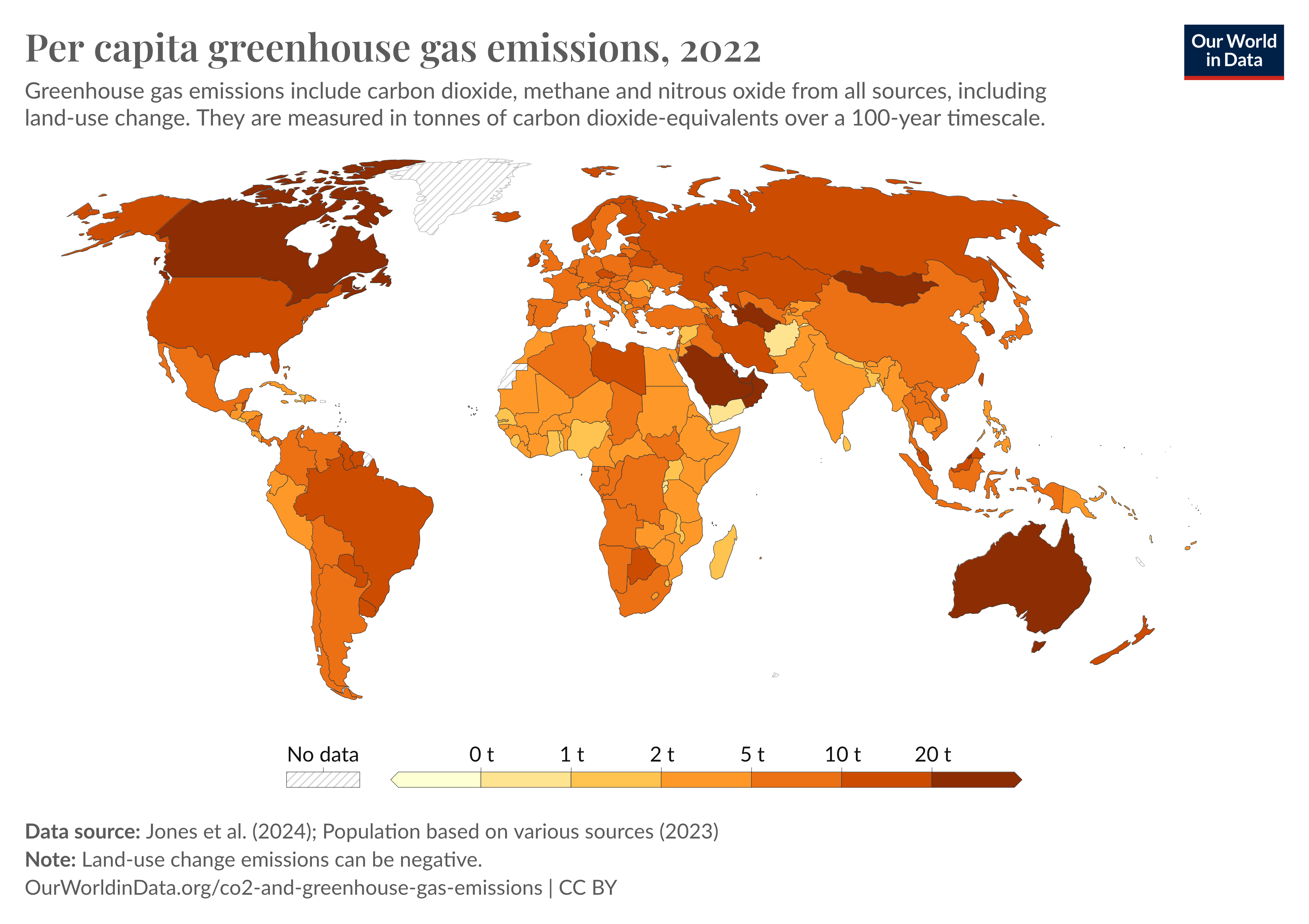
Per capita annual GHG emissions, including agriculture and land use change, measured in carbon dioxide-equivalents over a 100-year timescale.

2025 worldwide greenhouse gas (GHG) emissions per capita and by region. The width of each bar corresponds to the region's population size, and the height shows the emissions per capita. Therefore, the total area of each rectangle represents the total emissions for that specific region. The color of the area indicates the year-over-year growth of total emissions. In 2025, worldwide GHG emissions totaled 54.1 Gt CO₂eq across a global population of 8.18 billion.

This is a list of sovereign states and territories by greenhouse gas emissions due to certain forms of human activity, based on the EDGAR database created by European Commission. The following table lists the 1970, 1990, 2000, 2010, 2020, 2021, 2022, and 2023 annual GHG (Note: Greenhouse gases (GHG) constitute a group of gases contributing to global warming and climate change. The Kyoto Protocol, an environmental agreement adopted by many of the parties to the United Nations Framework Convention on Climate Change (UNFCCC) in 1997 to curb global warming, nowadays covers seven greenhouse gases: the non-fluorinated gases: carbon dioxide (CO_{2}), methane (CH_{4}), nitrous oxide (N_{2}O), the fluorinated gases: hydrofluorocarbons (HFCs), perfluorocarbons (PFCs), sulphur hexafluoride (SF_{6}), nitrogen trifluoride (NF_{3}).; Converting them to carbon dioxide (or CO_{2}) equivalents makes it possible to compare them and to determine their individual and total contributions to global warming.) emissions estimates (in kilotons of CO_{2} equivalent per year) along with a list of calculated emissions per capita (in metric tons of CO_{2} equivalent per year). The data include carbon dioxide, methane and nitrous oxide from all sources, including agriculture and land use change. They are measured in carbon dioxide-equivalents over a 100-year timescale.

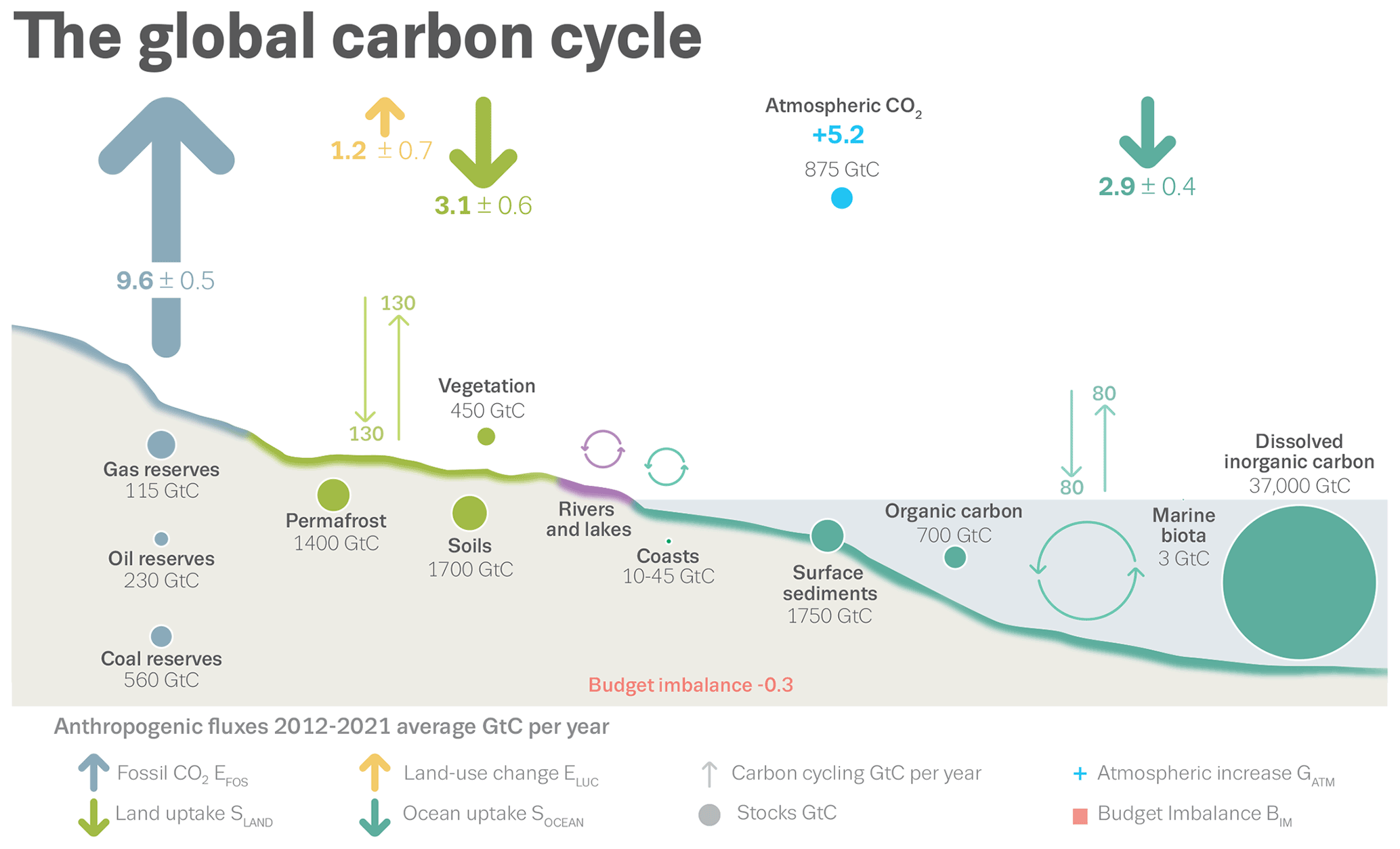
The Intergovernmental Panel on Climate Change (IPCC) 6th assessment report finds that the "Agriculture, Forestry and Other Land Use (AFOLU)" sector on average, accounted for 13–21% of global total anthropogenic GHG emissions in the period 2010–2019. Land use change drivers net AFOLU CO_{2} emission fluxes, with deforestation being responsible for 45% of total AFOLU emissions. In addition to being a net carbon sink and source of GHG emissions, land plays an important role in climate through albedo effects, evapotranspiration, and aerosol loading through emissions of volatile organic compounds. The IPCC report finds that the LULUCF sector offers significant near-term mitigation potential while providing food, wood and other renewable resources as well as biodiversity conservation. Mitigation measures in forests and other natural ecosystems provide the largest share of the LULUCF mitigation potential between 2020 and 2050. Among various LULUCF activities, reducing deforestation has the largest potential to reduce anthropogenic GHG emissions, followed by carbon sequestration in agriculture and ecosystem restoration including afforestation and reforestation. Land use change emissions can be negative. (Note: Global Carbon Project (2022) The rate of build-up of GHG in the atmosphere can be reduced by taking advantage of the fact that atmospheric CO_{2} can accumulate as carbon in vegetation and soils in terrestrial ecosystems. Under the United Nations Framework Convention on Climate Change any process, activity or mechanism which removes a greenhouse gas (GHG) from the atmosphere is referred to as a "sink". Human activities impact terrestrial sinks, through land use, land-use change and forestry (LULUCF), consequently, the exchange of CO_{2} (carbon cycle) between the terrestrial biosphere and the atmosphere is altered.)

In 2023, global GHG emissions reached 53.0 Gt_{CO_{2}eq} (without Land Use, land Use Change and Forestry). The 2023 data represent the highest level recorded and experienced an increase of 1.9% or 994 Mt_{CO_{2}eq} compared to the levels in 2022. The majority of GHG emissions consisted of fossil CO_{2} accounting for 73.7% of total emissions.

China, the United States, India, the EU27, Russia and Brazil were the world’s largest GHG emitters in 2023. Together they account for 49.8% of global population, 63.2% of global gross domestic product, 64.2% of global fossil fuel consumption and 62.7% of global GHG emissions. Among these top emitters, in 2023 China, India, Russia and Brazil increased their emissions compared to 2022, with India having the largest increase in relative terms (+ 6.1%) and China the largest absolute increase by 784 Mt_{CO_{2}eq}.

GHG emissions from the top 10 countries with the highest emissions accounted for almost two thirds of the global total. Since 2006, China has been emitting more CO_{2} than any other country.

However, the main disadvantage of measuring total national emissions is that it does not take population size into account. China has the largest CO_{2} and GHG emissions in the world, but also the second largest population. Some argue that for a fair comparison, emissions should be analyzed in terms of the amount of CO_{2} and GHG per capita.

Considering GHG per capita emissions in 2023, China's levels (11.11) are 53% higher than those of the European Union (7.26), are almost two-thirds those of the United States (17.61) and less than a sixth of those of Palau (65,29) – the country with the highest emissions of GHG per capita in 2023.

Measures of territorial-based emissions, also known as production-based emissions, do not account for emissions embedded in global trade, where emissions may be imported or exported in the form of traded goods, as it only reports emissions emitted within geographical boundaries. Accordingly, a proportion of the CO_{2} produced and reported in Asia and Africa is for the production of goods consumed in Europe and North America.

According to the review of the scientific literature conducted by the Intergovernmental Panel on Climate Change (IPCC), carbon dioxide is the most important anthropogenic greenhouse gas by warming contribution. Greenhouse gases (GHG) – primarily carbon dioxide but also others, including methane and chlorofluorocarbons – trap heat in the atmosphere, leading to global warming. Higher temperatures then act on the climate, with varying effects. For example, dry regions might become drier while, at the poles, the ice caps are melting, causing higher sea levels. In 2016, the global average temperature was already 1.1 °C above pre-industrial levels.

== GHG emissions by country/territory ==
The data in the following table is extracted from EDGAR - Emissions Database for Global Atmospheric Research.

GHG emissions (kt_{CO_{2}}/year)
Country/territory/region/group	Emissions								% of global total (2023)	Change (1990–2023)	Emissions per capita (2023)
Country/territory/region/group	1970	1990	2000	2010	2020	2021	2022	2023	% of global total (2023)	Change (1990–2023)	Emissions per capita (2023)
Aruba	36.71	219.98	347.85	528.33	482.16	531.20	533.60	561.50	0.001%	155.25% ▲	5.20
Afghanistan	15437.43	12561.60	13915.67	26937.01	26646.32	27643.07	28614.07	29460.05	0.056%	134.52% ▲	0.72
Angola	18998.76	31940.04	67023.25	69600.98	61680.08	64408.99	67210.84	67700.76	0.128%	111.96% ▲	1.87
Anguilla	3.36	7.90	17.88	27.11	26.04	25.22	25.07	26.21	0.000%	231.67% ▲	1.64
Albania	8224.85	11493.15	7179.74	8048.23	7967.36	8395.25	7812.02	7673.67	0.014%	−33.23% ▼	2.60
Curaçao	15074.48	2843.33	5886.10	4440.20	2144.21	2334.42	2419.62	2532.14	0.005%	−10.94% ▼	15.25
United Arab Emirates	29766.02	79495.39	117235.89	209712.97	249323.73	256964.88	267632.93	267823.19	0.506%	236.90% ▲	26.29
Argentina	219518.78	253796.44	288260.00	331467.69	347312.37	367613.98	374761.26	365684.62	0.690%	44.09% ▲	7.83
Armenia	12672.10	24312.44	5942.38	7004.30	9993.64	10671.38	10364.54	10836.34	0.020%	−55.43% ▼	3.69
Antigua and Barbuda	158.37	246.29	225.14	346.86	341.31	371.05	372.27	388.56	0.001%	57.76% ▲	3.60
Australia	315026.95	460295.94	546510.35	604604.03	584571.47	580737.83	569010.30	571839.85	1.080%	24.23% ▲	21.75
Austria	71810.87	80457.20	83514.06	88933.58	77273.35	80724.16	75408.47	72921.49	0.138%	−9.37% ▼	8.25
Azerbaijan	32715.95	67841.95	39855.72	44944.50	54724.45	56986.17	59026.28	62550.29	0.118%	−7.80% ▼	6.06
Burundi	1990.55	2892.23	2914.60	4140.53	6036.58	6835.35	6996.19	7049.14	0.013%	143.73% ▲	0.54
Belgium	166993.96	140549.55	151198.96	139623.97	115817.72	119752.70	112279.67	106370.19	0.201%	−24.32% ▼	9.05
Benin	2382.56	3856.95	6014.08	11625.34	17652.77	16018.63	16614.97	16699.49	0.032%	332.97% ▲	1.27
Burkina Faso	6469.93	11233.01	14080.52	23920.21	28824.75	33644.50	34021.03	34456.82	0.065%	206.75% ▲	1.52
Bangladesh	124355.81	130095.29	146011.98	200128.39	251559.29	269411.05	278488.86	281380.53	0.531%	116.29% ▲	1.61
Bulgaria	91517.33	103438.90	62443.30	62336.39	53565.86	60029.91	64232.61	53372.28	0.101%	−48.40% ▼	7.86
Bahrain	18391.88	29066.49	37586.07	48293.39	63184.53	63387.76	62505.47	63733.86	0.120%	119.27% ▲	35.25
Bahamas	1559.53	1306.94	1258.01	1592.27	1791.00	1948.82	1957.52	2050.28	0.004%	56.88% ▲	4.92
Bosnia and Herzegovina	16405.69	32807.89	19803.51	28337.56	30444.77	30278.66	30239.70	29397.99	0.056%	−10.39% ▼	8.46
Belarus	89042.13	139922.09	80014.59	94924.40	88580.59	88695.16	86803.11	84277.60	0.159%	−39.77% ▼	9.01
Belize	273.91	472.54	502.45	803.35	833.34	868.08	891.41	920.35	0.002%	94.77% ▲	2.19
Bermuda	161.24	281.86	177.63	339.37	344.08	359.58	360.65	378.84	0.001%	34.41% ▲	6.31
Bolivia	27011.13	29621.38	29388.11	40927.58	48016.11	52108.47	53502.50	55185.65	0.104%	86.30% ▲	4.59
Brazil	349405.64	671576.27	898956.92	1129476.44	1215999.15	1294511.47	1298489.35	1300168.87	2.455%	93.60% ▲	5.97
Barbados	500.36	859.93	839.76	1020.61	864.69	949.44	951.83	989.04	0.002%	15.01% ▲	3.42
Brunei	2779.26	5893.41	8525.24	10026.46	12574.00	12332.31	11887.32	12157.94	0.023%	106.30% ▲	26.43
Bhutan	702.27	1253.69	1426.39	2066.37	3065.15	3186.97	3217.61	3254.86	0.006%	159.62% ▲	3.78
Botswana	3380.54	9183.52	10565.57	9906.42	10504.73	11547.63	12392.72	12712.76	0.024%	38.43% ▲	5.01
Central African Republic	1628.67	7548.39	9145.19	10879.75	12497.43	12626.83	13024.28	12502.62	0.024%	65.63% ▲	2.38
Canada	466359.87	581912.83	710373.53	724625.05	711931.32	728267.91	745245.08	747678.03	1.412%	28.49% ▲	19.39
Switzerland and Liechtenstein	51317.74	54666.15	53593.00	55006.16	44982.33	46731.46	43562.65	43446.39	0.082%	−20.52% ▼	4.91
Chile	50422.10	58185.44	84429.83	102693.99	124090.85	125290.78	125387.99	121463.13	0.229%	108.75% ▲	6.44
China	2035096.63	3876387.77	5242735.81	11262908.31	14497898.72	15175619.09	15159641.99	15943986.55	30.104%	311.31% ▲	11.11
Ivory Coast	6374.11	10274.84	16469.55	19542.18	29500.56	31528.56	32168.70	32184.01	0.061%	213.23% ▲	1.14
Cameroon	7415.15	29846.34	30372.25	30289.46	38775.23	38888.25	39489.19	39377.19	0.074%	31.93% ▲	1.41
Democratic Republic of the Congo	11121.01	25458.69	26785.71	31064.87	50793.68	52235.30	55589.59	56105.91	0.106%	120.38% ▲	0.57
Congo	2412.81	10856.38	21647.81	21979.01	25029.90	23130.56	23727.01	23702.01	0.045%	118.32% ▲	3.86
Cook Islands	27.54	52.22	74.54	96.34	136.59	142.59	149.76	154.32	0.000%	195.50% ▲	9.08
Colombia	84709.14	134681.26	153543.70	172713.21	196503.40	208076.26	213106.14	223966.63	0.423%	66.29% ▲	4.37
Comoros	221.89	329.64	417.55	525.60	772.09	773.59	757.69	761.77	0.001%	131.09% ▲	0.82
Cape Verde	228.29	213.45	527.78	956.73	1189.73	1212.91	1260.71	1231.52	0.002%	476.95% ▲	2.09
Costa Rica	5772.32	9628.96	10951.70	13558.27	14372.09	15686.38	15927.07	16468.14	0.031%	71.03% ▲	3.19
Cuba	45796.58	61890.04	48852.04	47364.79	39518.23	38849.35	38236.83	39400.33	0.074%	−36.34% ▼	3.42
Cayman Islands	35.83	129.08	150.61	272.76	335.81	369.24	370.97	390.14	0.001%	202.25% ▲	5.91
Cyprus	2867.73	5417.39	8125.96	9459.86	9330.46	9614.39	10076.38	10324.66	0.019%	90.58% ▲	8.38
Czech Republic	220406.14	199978.50	158531.67	145334.43	117974.19	123432.37	123930.98	114438.42	0.216%	42.77% ▼	10.77
Germany	1325831.53	1235873.48	1035378.25	942526.35	749799.71	783488.63	761983.52	681810.33	1.287%	−44.83% ▼	8.26
Djibouti	982.58	1844.28	1865.96	2006.41	2084.43	2148.41	2121.92	2132.41	0.004%	15.62% ▲	2.05
Dominica	32.21	79.49	115.09	140.38	134.73	142.26	142.58	146.92	0.000%	84.82% ▲	1.93
Denmark	80357.96	69047.89	69570.93	63212.61	43557.28	44940.95	43226.13	41831.47	0.079%	−39.42% ▼	7.13
Dominican Republic	9604.25	17276.14	28160.59	34302.86	43008.99	46207.99	46412.38	48396.21	0.091%	180.13% ▲	4.23
Algeria	57188.79	135530.35	158333.69	184920.41	241131.97	253945.69	263216.12	256792.13	0.485%	89.47% ▲	5.68
Ecuador	13650.53	37978.42	45555.16	67604.69	64546.46	68625.71	70664.16	73604.61	0.139%	93.81% ▲	4.08
Egypt	60267.98	147661.97	196056.66	292115.76	306763.11	332306.00	333343.90	335968.05	0.634%	127.53% ▲	3.11
Eritrea	4083.42	4675.01	5429.77	5532.63	6296.28	6381.84	6369.00	6401.82	0.012%	36.94% ▲	1.10
Western Sahara	222.18	403.60	562.47	618.35	599.09	650.34	680.88	684.80	0.001%	69.67% ▲	1.07
Spain and Andorra	190473.06	297736.28	396603.00	375244.44	290387.56	308595.37	304886.33	285383.90	0.539%	−4.15% ▼	6.15
Estonia	25482.12	44463.17	20676.65	25092.79	14511.08	15283.59	15568.33	14363.97	0.027%	−67.69% ▼	11.14
Ethiopia	52777.51	62850.26	71807.04	119612.85	169992.79	164832.73	166832.91	170033.85	0.321%	170.54% ▲	1.41
Finland	57953.64	72223.00	73727.18	81398.84	52647.14	52448.27	48220.40	43453.54	0.082%	−39.83% ▼	7.71
Fiji	1451.76	2208.88	2855.63	3130.23	3091.91	3141.10	3308.79	3400.99	0.006%	53.97% ▲	3.61
Falkland Islands	155.74	164.79	154.72	164.00	164.71	170.31	170.56	172.39	0.000%	4.61% ▲	57.46
France and Monaco	636650.14	533013.81	540240.84	510830.35	398351.29	429487.31	416112.20	385520.12	0.728%	27.67% ▼	5.81
Faroe Islands	44.94	46.49	46.01	46.63	50.70	51.00	50.61	50.70	0.000%	9.06% ▲	0.99
Gabon	6808.94	20397.61	27902.18	20968.14	19759.78	18827.89	19755.89	21402.08	0.040%	4.92% ▲	9.37
United Kingdom	855073.77	760608.47	691041.76	590580.79	399603.64	419634.17	406519.51	379318.59	0.716%	−51.13% ▼	5.55
Georgia	30117.99	41870.86	11340.16	11998.63	17346.22	18176.26	18724.89	19049.15	0.036%	−54.50% ▼	4.93
Ghana	7010.45	10382.84	15269.78	23849.54	45354.79	46990.25	48204.92	48265.93	0.091%	364.86% ▲	1.48
Gibraltar	81.88	158.05	358.29	494.68	662.17	669.61	698.43	712.37	0.001%	350.71% ▲	20.35
Guinea	5007.26	7799.64	11331.60	18500.27	26332.77	26991.33	27960.99	28634.66	0.054%	267.13% ▲	1.93
Guadeloupe	411.65	932.71	873.71	1295.81	1407.94	1408.19	1408.52	1462.23	0.003%	56.77% ▲	3.26
The Gambia	702.14	948.91	1258.97	1964.94	1923.21	1837.38	1918.27	1888.80	0.004%	99.05% ▲	0.76
Guinea-Bissau	759.62	1655.85	2006.34	2619.17	2891.56	2930.10	2999.06	2997.48	0.006%	81.02% ▲	1.40
Equatorial Guinea	125.01	184.96	12010.71	14984.95	9337.53	8624.64	8177.05	6982.10	0.013%	3674.97% ▲	4.52
Greece	45151.27	99055.93	121054.97	111550.13	71705.30	73065.91	73154.44	69266.03	0.131%	−30.07% ▼	6.29
Grenada	52.19	92.76	103.61	169.35	177.23	191.05	192.29	200.41	0.000%	116.06% ▲	1.81
Greenland	56.73	61.32	59.40	715.96	591.91	613.08	640.80	647.26	0.001%	955.55% ▲	11.36
Guatemala	8389.68	13103.06	21666.03	28218.51	39300.77	42242.35	42310.56	43981.07	0.083%	235.65% ▲	2.33
French Guiana	112.43	366.13	325.73	467.15	544.02	551.93	553.83	573.39	0.001%	56.61% ▲	1.76
Guyana	5016.73	3760.63	4702.30	4866.67	7365.70	7358.03	8285.24	8190.99	0.015%	117.81% ▲	10.20
Hong Kong	11616.28	39196.12	46647.18	47119.80	40520.53	40471.94	38026.32	40167.76	0.076%	2.48% ▲	5.23
Honduras	5801.43	9123.98	11443.06	18342.82	20331.55	21494.73	22106.53	22920.14	0.043%	151.21% ▲	2.26
Croatia	28526.37	33448.31	25012.39	27486.30	25039.99	25368.72	24990.36	25013.48	0.047%	−25.22% ▼	6.18
Haiti	6212.71	7325.50	9653.06	11895.16	13501.12	13418.84	13512.64	13656.96	0.026%	86.43% ▲	1.16
Hungary	91088.11	96749.67	77489.32	67688.99	65841.34	67110.10	64269.55	60926.77	0.115%	−37.03% ▼	6.40
Indonesia	206332.55	397098.83	562893.31	781990.27	1050339.15	1077077.84	1152726.01	1200199.79	2.266%	202.24% ▲	4.29
India	792811.36	1383063.84	1845452.20	2747617.77	3433618.98	3679861.78	3897208.99	4133554.36	7.805%	198.87% ▲	2.90
Ireland	39602.62	57250.19	74469.77	66642.63	59258.45	61315.62	60378.56	57853.27	0.109%	1.05% ▲	11.58
Iran	220710.85	332715.69	512102.41	768061.83	889285.86	931629.97	960494.31	996752.68	1.882%	199.58% ▲	11.64
Iraq	103843.45	172019.44	168338.13	210601.04	331582.28	335790.83	365295.98	362784.80	0.685%	110.90% ▲	8.08
Iceland	3214.24	4411.89	3912.02	4972.18	4198.85	4358.78	4371.07	4171.94	0.008%	−5.44% ▼	11.89
Israel and State of Palestine	72660.04	41813.33	69034.52	83052.38	78130.40	78445.75	80736.83	79578.17	0.150%	90.32% ▲	5.36
Italy, San Marino and Holy See	394308.36	511706.58	543542.95	505353.59	369458.89	406702.18	403121.52	374124.19	0.706%	26.89% ▼	6.36
Jamaica	9226.94	9197.66	11936.78	8926.66	7164.55	7732.25	7656.13	8162.92	0.015%	−11.25% ▼	2.79
Jordan	3581.23	12135.86	19725.12	26153.84	30314.40	31491.94	31823.41	33407.71	0.063%	175.28% ▲	3.19
Japan	1016283.47	1317217.96	1391121.30	1324225.51	1168753.37	1181769.56	1107575.79	1041012.82	1.966%	−20.97% ▼	8.31
Kazakhstan	267674.32	347015.70	177106.04	317902.18	300442.13	323213.12	320917.12	320349.98	0.605%	−7.68% ▼	16.60
Kenya	22740.16	38350.17	41282.35	78511.28	108421.55	101810.59	104286.48	107976.91	0.204%	181.56% ▲	1.88
Kyrgyzstan	22994.23	33371.70	10909.27	14106.86	20005.53	21390.45	21423.79	21698.23	0.041%	−34.98% ▼	3.32
Cambodia	25581.65	19710.12	22718.96	32666.44	46509.40	48160.86	47599.12	48774.83	0.092%	147.46% ▲	2.81
Kiribati	27.68	33.40	52.40	86.21	116.07	120.79	126.39	130.18	0.000%	289.79% ▲	1.02
Saint Kitts and Nevis	58.47	59.88	94.06	145.08	141.55	158.34	165.45	174.47	0.000%	191.40% ▲	3.01
South Korea	99677.83	325074.92	538536.88	663999.20	689106.59	710522.98	668324.91	653846.14	1.235%	101.14% ▲	12.58
Kuwait	79436.18	50543.36	88056.41	125970.90	149033.41	157800.57	165381.38	167915.77	0.317%	232.22% ▲	37.45
Laos	6904.21	8024.10	9771.92	14765.17	34479.18	38793.77	40074.97	42056.21	0.079%	424.12% ▲	5.65
Lebanon	6769.55	7761.66	18162.22	24896.28	28487.76	23719.49	23967.20	24672.32	0.047%	217.87% ▲	4.27
Liberia	1568.39	1710.75	2086.22	3181.03	4355.80	4415.24	4564.30	4532.39	0.009%	164.94% ▲	0.82
Libya	137146.89	87055.24	91732.65	106017.23	64383.08	90106.31	88999.24	95929.77	0.181%	10.19% ▲	13.91
Saint Lucia	76.89	147.06	213.44	288.35	396.63	426.75	431.97	451.27	0.001%	206.85% ▲	2.47
Sri Lanka	19081.32	21092.32	26122.06	31120.18	39796.56	40573.49	37673.41	38403.85	0.073%	82.08% ▲	1.81
Lesotho	1905.73	2120.29	2660.76	2782.10	2428.81	2526.94	2652.71	2601.92	0.005%	22.72% ▲	1.08
Lithuania	29607.70	46708.58	18440.44	22725.95	22680.71	22495.16	20803.61	20683.66	0.039%	−55.72% ▼	7.35
Luxembourg	20506.42	12916.23	9793.95	12201.10	8836.41	9208.06	8126.16	7860.93	0.015%	−39.14% ▼	12.54
Latvia	17275.44	27081.47	10192.02	12591.95	11648.95	11864.53	11083.50	10957.49	0.021%	−59.54% ▼	5.95
Macao	332.20	1006.96	1539.81	1800.18	2969.61	2905.73	3025.08	3119.01	0.006%	209.74% ▲	4.57
Morocco	22248.80	42461.53	56647.30	80579.74	103177.85	109283.26	106451.11	106602.23	0.201%	151.06% ▲	2.78
Moldova	23379.75	37384.35	9871.88	11457.54	12310.69	13205.63	12954.69	13542.41	0.026%	−63.78% ▼	3.41
Madagascar	20255.95	23921.34	25848.88	28300.01	31728.82	33013.52	33294.67	33150.78	0.063%	38.58% ▲	1.11
Maldives	20.97	135.75	703.34	1173.46	2702.82	2832.60	2986.50	3087.95	0.006%	2174.77% ▲	6.45
Mexico	205603.04	440315.01	566048.81	669998.35	643880.87	670552.79	687544.06	712102.10	1.345%	61.73% ▲	5.15
North Macedonia	12277.68	14404.87	11411.47	11741.71	10292.95	10240.44	11001.28	11370.03	0.021%	21.07% ▼	5.44
Mali	11713.99	12578.21	16469.20	26728.03	43492.48	45425.76	44834.18	45463.10	0.086%	261.44% ▲	2.05
Malta	790.31	2490.55	2343.41	2961.61	1978.51	1985.91	2112.31	2033.87	0.004%	−18.34% ▼	4.65
Myanmar	69475.90	67361.34	83218.28	108364.68	121139.51	119210.06	118337.64	115077.25	0.217%	70.84% ▲	2.05
Mongolia	15751.43	25736.66	25144.24	38256.18	65530.83	67293.64	66879.11	83704.56	0.158%	225.23% ▲	25.14
Mozambique	9591.37	8840.94	10848.55	14718.24	28513.33	31921.43	34432.18	33953.98	0.064%	284.05% ▲	0.97
Mauritania	5648.99	6649.01	9136.96	11397.00	16004.67	16134.43	16438.62	16509.27	0.031%	148.30% ▲	3.20
Martinique	363.12	898.96	829.68	1132.84	898.35	1041.11	1166.37	1218.42	0.002%	35.54% ▲	3.16
Mauritius	823.07	1843.01	3242.01	4982.22	5567.76	5859.03	5974.73	6198.74	0.012%	236.34% ▲	4.84
Malawi	2387.28	5872.27	8136.38	11439.84	17297.97	18427.14	18599.49	19714.05	0.037%	235.71% ▲	0.89
Malaysia	45307.12	92336.04	163960.68	256557.19	294666.42	299786.49	315788.50	325405.85	0.614%	252.41% ▲	9.53
Namibia	6468.01	6553.44	8340.50	9936.08	11255.84	12143.99	12778.28	12885.68	0.024%	96.62% ▲	4.50
New Caledonia	1351.70	1928.58	2507.58	3745.96	6905.27	5997.97	6277.52	6614.22	0.012%	242.96% ▲	22.27
Niger	11065.78	10763.08	16217.05	23317.53	37153.95	39138.06	40917.07	42334.09	0.080%	293.33% ▲	1.57
Nigeria	182189.71	278306.90	405319.76	345845.81	381242.38	386799.73	380162.50	385112.88	0.727%	38.38% ▲	1.73
Nicaragua	8978.47	10138.98	13008.20	15448.81	19140.02	19754.64	20215.65	20628.27	0.039%	103.46% ▲	3.12
Netherlands	178916.53	223185.71	225073.32	219240.95	170500.37	174717.78	161166.11	150745.80	0.285%	−32.46% ▼	8.70
Norway	53963.38	54671.47	56878.07	62571.18	57139.67	57905.83	57245.55	56717.10	0.107%	3.74% ▲	10.12
Nepal	24945.11	30403.10	34298.69	39798.62	54858.43	55380.10	55848.83	56830.98	0.107%	86.92% ▲	1.82
New Zealand	57070.69	71269.29	81266.98	84707.95	84778.06	84562.28	83388.99	84209.81	0.159%	18.16% ▲	16.99
Oman	14842.39	34959.50	52060.06	76420.66	113213.28	119858.11	125242.54	127443.02	0.241%	264.54% ▲	23.43
Pakistan	100145.27	201491.84	279346.34	377482.14	525798.36	551049.63	536052.21	532374.48	1.005%	164.22% ▲	2.43
Panama	6182.43	7045.99	9772.03	14933.37	15808.92	17229.04	18455.34	21281.69	0.040%	202.04% ▲	4.76
Peru	38167.51	44654.78	58228.87	76714.07	81031.81	87973.02	92200.94	94048.68	0.178%	110.61% ▲	2.73
Philippines	87225.22	101191.19	138307.04	162365.00	229349.81	240411.68	244525.82	256147.15	0.484%	153.13% ▲	2.24
Palau	2166.45	2343.63	2241.12	2205.35	1336.18	1389.73	1462.15	1501.65	0.003%	−35.93% ▼	65.29
Papua New Guinea	1946.07	4065.37	6075.22	6537.32	9615.37	9251.05	9506.24	9641.00	0.018%	137.15% ▲	1.04
Poland	484223.30	512853.34	414864.66	417002.82	377510.47	405082.51	397221.58	363794.25	0.687%	−29.06% ▼	9.67
Puerto Rico	31445.37	21746.79	27849.37	16142.16	14670.16	14886.50	14876.23	16063.99	0.030%	26.13% ▼	4.42
North Korea	98757.80	167646.28	101238.47	98787.26	96746.31	83001.09	85692.33	90148.48	0.170%	46.33% ▼	3.45
Portugal	29607.56	58519.10	80877.21	68339.65	57452.88	55788.65	56217.57	53004.61	0.100%	−9.42% ▼	5.24
Paraguay	10405.15	20804.66	24881.76	36404.06	42560.88	43439.40	41606.88	41624.56	0.079%	100.07% ▲	5.69
French Polynesia	193.12	947.83	819.70	1093.24	1210.69	1266.06	1331.69	1374.56	0.003%	45.02% ▲	4.66
Qatar	23538.95	26286.64	59998.19	93745.40	140149.60	143129.22	144464.89	154383.57	0.291%	487.31% ▲	52.57
Réunion	515.29	1157.48	2340.21	2968.97	2895.96	2902.26	2904.73	2920.70	0.006%	152.33% ▲	3.19
Romania	174541.46	241355.14	130761.46	117429.31	110766.52	115836.35	110958.75	105852.40	0.200%	−56.14% ▼	5.54
Russia	1723159.42	3065696.36	2089101.89	2203254.71	2395615.61	2547955.36	2621518.02	2672039.44	5.045%	−12.84% ▼	18.66
Rwanda	4231.77	5571.74	3983.37	5730.67	7528.20	7687.26	7474.79	7493.27	0.014%	34.49% ▲	0.54
Saudi Arabia	80469.66	236538.29	350221.51	603145.18	733063.49	751180.47	786955.22	805158.11	1.520%	240.39% ▲	22.17
Serbia and Montenegro	45956.69	85329.92	65839.81	72913.12	71438.89	69458.88	69030.82	67214.99	0.127%	21.23% ▼	7.28
Sudan and South Sudan	38313.83	60615.13	94849.40	124335.09	136671.96	138266.27	137728.59	138741.57	0.262%	128.89% ▲	2.23
Senegal	7766.22	9944.86	13568.52	19406.68	26966.71	28366.07	28793.59	28843.73	0.054%	190.04% ▲	1.55
Singapore	7441.56	33756.29	57244.92	58051.56	68069.51	70868.39	71847.04	74290.13	0.140%	120.08% ▲	12.22
Saint Helena, Ascension and Tristan da Cunha	5.71	13.31	14.25	14.67	19.07	19.39	20.74	21.27	0.000%	59.86% ▲	5.32
Solomon Islands	152.16	306.74	413.71	583.67	650.71	674.34	701.51	720.82	0.001%	134.99% ▲	1.05
Sierra Leone	2936.60	4021.97	3581.47	5681.91	6632.44	7474.65	6926.58	6937.72	0.013%	72.50% ▲	0.81
El Salvador	5510.36	7202.80	10363.90	11524.30	11215.88	12107.05	12522.84	13051.31	0.025%	81.20% ▲	1.98
Somalia	18581.11	25571.67	28168.43	29973.14	32444.99	32256.53	32362.40	32499.94	0.061%	27.09% ▲	1.85
Saint Pierre and Miquelon	41.47	98.41	23.45	42.46	43.20	45.14	46.21	46.57	0.000%	−52.67% ▼	6.65
São Tomé and Príncipe	34.18	82.35	114.82	196.35	260.49	262.84	292.78	303.45	0.001%	268.50% ▲	1.30
Suriname	2027.91	2330.79	2519.63	2844.38	3748.08	3746.21	3658.39	3737.72	0.007%	60.36% ▲	6.32
Slovakia	57623.34	75242.82	51492.75	49835.44	42516.34	46782.53	45486.58	44775.61	0.085%	−40.49% ▼	8.22
Slovenia	14772.86	21427.17	20416.64	22057.30	17825.24	17971.08	17164.84	15993.52	0.030%	−25.36% ▼	7.69
Sweden	114536.57	75094.22	75612.66	68221.18	52042.76	53925.29	50130.00	49118.37	0.093%	−34.59% ▼	4.76
Eswatini	1831.16	3219.16	3254.33	2785.53	3026.63	3135.24	3244.16	3289.55	0.006%	2.19% ▲	2.18
Seychelles	130.05	316.98	825.05	993.69	1219.67	1241.34	1301.79	1338.71	0.003%	322.33% ▲	13.80
Syria	15643.52	63408.39	84955.04	88695.93	40539.69	40073.08	40208.09	41210.58	0.078%	−35.01% ▼	1.92
Turks and Caicos Islands	4.50	9.17	25.70	83.76	96.33	105.31	105.28	110.25	0.000%	1102.36% ▲	2.90
Chad	8926.96	17155.50	26672.78	46767.08	81980.66	85506.73	91033.67	95377.32	0.180%	455.96% ▲	5.37
Togo	1884.68	3306.60	4798.45	7401.75	9597.39	10119.56	10477.39	10612.91	0.020%	220.96% ▲	1.18
Thailand	117924.48	217046.03	293942.68	408580.59	433721.24	429462.92	442492.31	440783.01	0.832%	103.08% ▲	6.33
Tajikistan	14263.41	22011.39	10506.05	11870.68	21041.24	21175.58	21196.69	21438.12	0.040%	−2.60% ▼	2.14
Turkmenistan	28820.27	61306.07	59690.81	88847.82	99785.95	98340.50	99816.98	98794.12	0.187%	61.15% ▲	15.73
East Timor	648.82	518.73	925.69	2136.34	1913.66	1916.13	2015.37	2007.18	0.004%	286.95% ▲	1.36
Tonga	67.13	194.65	209.38	238.85	312.22	322.25	334.30	342.11	0.001%	75.75% ▲	3.03
Trinidad and Tobago	9098.38	15901.68	23469.35	48076.77	36512.87	35397.96	34802.62	34187.02	0.065%	114.99% ▲	24.76
Tunisia	10473.55	23219.69	31628.70	40131.81	40196.79	43097.21	42436.07	43578.53	0.082%	87.68% ▲	3.56
Turkey	99844.69	221694.40	314190.42	414362.17	583364.27	624632.25	598844.01	606429.86	1.145%	173.54% ▲	7.10
Taiwan	52317.28	146683.87	259411.81	313608.34	316767.58	327696.21	315858.99	308000.43	0.582%	109.98% ▲	12.85
Tanzania	19467.56	28654.95	38739.22	53880.36	83306.81	87075.44	87584.79	89815.44	0.170%	213.44% ▲	1.31
Uganda	10902.09	15096.58	19419.89	35463.61	50201.76	53056.64	53080.70	53370.99	0.101%	253.53% ▲	1.03
Ukraine	607125.21	968526.74	454530.68	404169.40	287552.06	281544.38	216474.82	216092.81	0.408%	−77.69% ▼	5.04
Uruguay	28859.99	29253.19	34204.42	38817.85	38916.44	42571.29	42151.88	41634.11	0.079%	42.32% ▲	11.80
United States	5788649.39	6209294.71	7203334.42	6709534.29	5671604.44	5997650.75	6046215.74	5960804.38	11.255%	−4.00% ▼	17.61
Uzbekistan	79737.48	164503.69	167616.34	192900.72	197993.86	210317.64	216299.33	214531.38	0.405%	30.41% ▲	6.23
Saint Vincent and the Grenadines	45.69	77.08	92.72	153.65	136.19	145.28	145.67	150.78	0.000%	95.61% ▲	1.36
Venezuela	106494.38	163323.76	222224.00	260152.06	136336.65	134693.23	143913.98	152389.92	0.288%	−6.69% ▼	4.44
British Virgin Islands	15.77	29.03	39.74	84.47	79.47	86.59	87.00	91.07	0.000%	213.74% ▲	2.68
Vietnam	89762.49	104423.09	164302.96	294361.93	497416.80	490552.52	473629.92	524133.46	0.990%	401.93% ▲	5.19
Vanuatu	292.25	472.36	529.03	677.35	629.09	643.76	658.74	670.21	0.001%	41.88% ▲	2.15
Samoa	157.80	295.49	363.69	469.18	565.56	617.13	635.67	646.14	0.001%	118.67% ▲	3.17
Yemen	5397.88	17505.49	32425.61	52979.08	32878.09	33430.71	33175.04	32242.87	0.061%	84.19% ▲	1.00
South Africa	241122.29	406996.32	451249.38	582477.83	541709.64	550984.44	533026.90	522115.49	0.986%	28.29% ▲	8.61
Zambia	12463.52	15481.79	14828.98	18870.00	27344.12	28249.10	29845.83	30484.45	0.058%	96.91% ▲	1.50
Zimbabwe	21723.58	34348.03	32470.94	27483.38	26770.63	28878.41	29825.43	31019.31	0.059%	−9.69% ▼	1.65
(United Nations) GLOBAL TOTAL	24002751.74	32726228.02	36175146.34	45814943.39	49327538.89	51568250.03	51968471.60	52962900.86	100.000%	61.84% ▲	6.59
European Union	4591422.70	4877284.15	4481448.73	4235322.51	3388278.79	3577018.02	3482310.46	3221794.61	6.083%	33.94% ▼	7.26
Air transport	172478.02	264256.68	360055.44	472871.29	302632.34	335728.73	416953.42	498178.11	0.941%	88.52% ▲	—
Sea transport	375869.28	395335.18	535208.07	701242.32	671578.72	692682.47	739009.25	746943.68	1.410%	88.94% ▲	—

== GHG emissions 2023 vs. GHG emissions per capita 2023 ==
Sorting is in descending order, by GHG emissions in 2023, starting with the maximum value — China (15943986.55 kt_{CO_{2}eq} = 100%). Percentages for GHG emissions per capita 2023 are also related to the maximum value — Palau (65.29 t_{CO_{2}eq} = 100%).

GHG emissions 2023 (kt_{CO_{2}}) and GHG emissions per capita 2023 (t_{CO_{2}})
GHG emissions 2023	Country/Territory/Region/Group	GHG emissions per capita 2023
kt_{CO_{2}}	Country/Territory/Region/Group	t_{CO_{2}}
15943986.55	China	11.11
5960804.38	United States	17.61
4133554.36	India	2.90
2672039.44	Russia	18.66
1300168.87	Brazil	5.97
1200199.79	Indonesia	4.29
1041012.82	Japan	8.31
996752.68	Iran	11.64
805158.11	Saudi Arabia	22.17
747678.03	Canada	19.39
712102.10	Mexico	5.15
681810.33	Germany	8.26
653846.14	South Korea	12.58
606429.86	Turkey	7.10
571839.85	Australia	21.75
532374.48	Pakistan	2.43
524133.46	Vietnam	5.19
522115.49	South Africa	8.61
440783.01	Thailand	6.33
385520.12	France and Monaco	5.81
385112.88	Nigeria	1.73
379318.59	United Kingdom	5.55
374124.19	Italy, San Marino and Holy See	6.36
365684.62	Argentina	7.83
363794.25	Poland	9.67
362784.80	Iraq	8.08
335968.05	Egypt	3.11
325405.85	Malaysia	9.53
320349.98	Kazakhstan	16.60
308000.43	Taiwan	12.85
285383.90	Spain and Andorra	6.15
281380.53	Bangladesh	1.61
267823.19	United Arab Emirates	26.29
256792.13	Algeria	5.68
256147.15	Philippines	2.24
223966.63	Colombia	4.37
216092.81	Ukraine	5.04
214531.38	Uzbekistan	6.23
170033.85	Ethiopia	1.41
167915.77	Kuwait	37.45
154383.57	Qatar	52.57
152389.92	Venezuela	4.44
150745.80	Netherlands	8.70
138741.57	Sudan and South Sudan	2.23
127443.02	Oman	23.43
121463.13	Chile	6.44
115077.25	Myanmar	2.05
114438.42	Czech Republic	10.77
107976.91	Kenya	1.88
106602.23	Morocco	2.78
106370.19	Belgium	9.05
105852.40	Romania	5.54
98794.12	Turkmenistan	15.73
95929.77	Libya	13.91
95377.32	Chad	5.37
94048.68	Peru	2.73
90148.48	North Korea	3.45
89815.44	Tanzania	1.31
84277.60	Belarus	9.01
84209.81	New Zealand	16.99
83704.56	Mongolia	25.14
79578.17	Israel and State of Palestine	5.36
74290.13	Singapore	12.22
73604.61	Ecuador	4.08
72921.49	Austria	8.25
69266.03	Greece	6.29
67700.76	Angola	1.87
67214.99	Serbia and Montenegro	7.28
63733.86	Bahrain	35.25
62550.29	Azerbaijan	6.06
60926.77	Hungary	6.40
57853.27	Ireland	11.58
56830.98	Nepal	1.82
56717.10	Norway	10.12
56105.91	Democratic Republic of the Congo	0.57
55185.65	Bolivia	4.59
53372.28	Bulgaria	7.86
53370.99	Uganda	1.03
53004.61	Portugal	5.24
49118.37	Sweden	4.76
48774.83	Cambodia	2.81
48396.21	Dominican Republic	4.23
48265.93	Ghana	1.48
45463.10	Mali	2.05
44775.61	Slovakia	8.22
43981.07	Guatemala	2.33
43578.53	Tunisia	3.56
43453.54	Finland	7.71
43446.39	Switzerland and Liechtenstein	4.91
42334.09	Niger	1.57
42056.21	Laos	5.65
41831.47	Denmark	7.13
41634.11	Uruguay	11.80
41624.56	Paraguay	5.69
41210.58	Syria	1.92
40167.76	Hong Kong	5.23
39400.33	Cuba	3.42
39377.19	Cameroon	1.41
38403.85	Sri Lanka	1.81
34456.82	Burkina Faso	1.52
34187.02	Trinidad and Tobago	24.76
33953.98	Mozambique	0.97
33407.71	Jordan	3.19
33150.78	Madagascar	1.11
32499.94	Somalia	1.85
32242.87	Yemen	1.00
32184.01	Ivory Coast	1.14
31019.31	Zimbabwe	1.65
30484.45	Zambia	1.50
29460.05	Afghanistan	0.72
29397.99	Bosnia and Herzegovina	8.46
28843.73	Senegal	1.55
28634.66	Guinea	1.93
25013.48	Croatia	6.18
24672.32	Lebanon	4.27
23702.01	Congo	3.86
22920.14	Honduras	2.26
21698.23	Kyrgyzstan	3.32
21438.12	Tajikistan	2.14
21402.08	Gabon	9.37
21281.69	Panama	4.76
20683.66	Lithuania	7.35
20628.27	Nicaragua	3.12
19714.05	Malawi	0.89
19049.15	Georgia	4.93
16699.49	Benin	1.27
16509.27	Mauritania	3.20
16468.14	Costa Rica	3.19
16063.99	Puerto Rico	4.42
15993.52	Slovenia	7.69
14363.97	Estonia	11.14
13656.96	Haiti	1.16
13542.41	Moldova	3.41
13051.31	El Salvador	1.98
12885.68	Namibia	4.50
12712.76	Botswana	5.01
12502.62	Central African Republic	2.38
12157.94	Brunei	26.43
11370.03	North Macedonia	5.44
10957.49	Latvia	5.95
10836.34	Armenia	3.69
10612.91	Togo	1.18
10324.66	Cyprus	8.38
9641.00	Papua New Guinea	1.04
8190.99	Guyana	10.20
8162.92	Jamaica	2.79
7860.93	Luxembourg	12.54
7673.67	Albania	2.60
7493.27	Rwanda	0.54
7049.14	Burundi	0.54
6982.10	Equatorial Guinea	4.52
6937.72	Sierra Leone	0.81
6614.22	New Caledonia	22.27
6401.82	Eritrea	1.10
6198.74	Mauritius	4.84
4532.39	Liberia	0.82
4171.94	Iceland	11.89
3737.72	Suriname	6.32
3400.99	Fiji	3.61
3289.55	Eswatini	2.18
3254.86	Bhutan	3.78
3119.01	Macao	4.57
3087.95	Maldives	6.45
2997.48	Guinea-Bissau	1.40
2920.70	Réunion	3.19
2601.92	Lesotho	1.08
2532.14	Curaçao	15.25
2132.41	Djibouti	2.05
2050.28	Bahamas	4.92
2033.87	Malta	4.65
2007.18	East Timor	1.36
1888.80	The Gambia	0.76
1501.65	Palau	65.29
1462.23	Guadeloupe	3.26
1374.56	French Polynesia	4.66
1338.71	Seychelles	13.80
1231.52	Cape Verde	2.09
1218.42	Martinique	3.16
989.04	Barbados	3.42
920.35	Belize	2.19
761.77	Comoros	0.82
720.82	Solomon Islands	1.05
712.37	Gibraltar	20.35
684.80	Western Sahara	1.07
670.21	Vanuatu	2.15
647.26	Greenland	11.36
646.14	Samoa	3.17
573.39	French Guiana	1.76
561.50	Aruba	5.20
451.27	Saint Lucia	2.47
390.14	Cayman Islands	5.91
388.56	Antigua and Barbuda	3.60
378.84	Bermuda	6.31
342.11	Tonga	3.03
303.45	São Tomé and Príncipe	1.30
200.41	Grenada	1.81
174.47	Saint Kitts and Nevis	3.01
172.39	Falkland Islands	57.46
154.32	Cook Islands	9.08
150.78	Saint Vincent and the Grenadines	1.36
146.92	Dominica	1.93
130.18	Kiribati	1.02
110.25	Turks and Caicos Islands	2.90
91.07	British Virgin Islands	2.68
50.70	Faroe Islands	0.99
46.57	Saint Pierre and Miquelon	6.65
26.21	Anguilla	1.64
21.27	Saint Helena, Ascension and Tristan da Cunha	5.32
52962900.86	(United Nations) Global Total	6.59
3221794.61	European Union	7.26

== Cumulative GHG emissions 1970-2023 vs. GHG emissions 2023 ==
Sorting is in descending order, by total GHG emissions 1970-2023, starting with the maximum value — China (370328794.88 kt_{CO_{2}eq} = 100%). Percentages for GHG emissions 2023 are also related to the maximum value — China (15943986.55 kt_{CO_{2}eq} = 100%).

Cumulative GHG emissions 1970-2023 (kt_{CO_{2}}) and GHG emissions 2023 (kt_{CO_{2}})
Cumulative GHG emissions 1970-2023	Country/Territory/Region/Group	GHG emissions 2023
kt_{CO_{2}}	Country/Territory/Region/Group	kt_{CO_{2}}
370328794.88	China	15943986.55
342349275.91	United States	5960804.38
125898963.23	Russia	2672039.44
105116798.89	India	4133554.36
67956478.15	Japan	1041012.82
59944943.77	Germany	681810.33
45628510.28	Brazil	1300168.87
36646490.16	United Kingdom	379318.59
35006516.06	Canada	747678.03
31424825.15	Ukraine	216092.81
30773840.34	Indonesia	1200199.79
29535722.17	France and Monaco	385520.12
27752134.01	Iran	996752.68
27408178.48	Mexico	712102.10
26530697.15	Poland	363794.25
26530005.95	Australia	571839.85
25883360.06	Italy, San Marino and Holy See	374124.19
23977339.13	South Africa	522115.49
23495232.40	South Korea	653846.14
21132713.60	Saudi Arabia	805158.11
17591111.30	Nigeria	385112.88
17210752.61	Spain and Andorra	285383.90
16320405.17	Turkey	606429.86
15770058.71	Kazakhstan	320349.98
15767202.29	Argentina	365684.62
15228560.11	Thailand	440783.01
14839612.74	Pakistan	532374.48
11357310.71	Taiwan	308000.43
11292392.84	Netherlands	150745.80
10865726.00	Vietnam	524133.46
10535019.77	Egypt	335968.05
10185411.04	Iraq	362784.80
9942749.31	Venezuela	152389.92
9554747.27	Romania	105852.40
9550892.80	Czech Republic	114438.42
8830605.62	Bangladesh	281380.53
8469271.55	Malaysia	325405.85
8457988.89	Algeria	256792.13
8382430.67	Uzbekistan	214531.38
7889070.89	Colombia	223966.63
7739177.41	Belgium	106370.19
7467719.81	Philippines	256147.15
7130644.08	United Arab Emirates	267823.19
6295995.98	North Korea	90148.48
5600695.78	Belarus	84277.60
5117162.72	Kuwait	167915.77
4969246.61	Greece	69266.03
4779939.58	Libya	95929.77
4764948.95	Myanmar	115077.25
4727819.90	Hungary	60926.77
4716389.53	Sudan and South Sudan	138741.57
4715146.12	Ethiopia	170033.85
4499287.26	Bulgaria	53372.28
4445519.10	Austria	72921.49
4320385.79	Chile	121463.13
4206879.36	Sweden	49118.37
4096769.13	New Zealand	84209.81
3754417.77	Serbia and Montenegro	67214.99
3719254.95	Finland	43453.54
3708793.08	Denmark	41831.47
3463463.98	Turkmenistan	98794.12
3450785.37	Qatar	154383.57
3282210.54	Israel and State of Palestine	79578.17
3211307.02	Ireland	57853.27
3211043.72	Peru	94048.68
3155351.90	Portugal	53004.61
3134400.89	Morocco	106602.23
3125290.95	Slovakia	44775.61
3101328.00	Norway	56717.10
3072301.46	Oman	127443.02
2936373.58	Syria	41210.58
2843622.05	Switzerland and Liechtenstein	43446.39
2778233.16	Kenya	107976.91
2658181.15	Cuba	39400.33
2644311.69	Angola	67700.76
2619016.92	Azerbaijan	62550.29
2502220.53	Ecuador	73604.61
2277593.17	Tanzania	89815.44
2199984.21	Singapore	74290.13
2037521.88	Bahrain	63733.86
2007555.79	Hong Kong	40167.76
1920370.65	Bolivia	55185.65
1912489.44	Nepal	56830.98
1907465.00	Uruguay	41634.11
1730556.08	Chad	95377.32
1729175.19	Mongolia	83704.56
1615780.27	Lithuania	20683.66
1588852.68	Estonia	14363.97
1570106.22	Croatia	25013.48
1516366.93	Tunisia	43578.53
1513116.40	Democratic Republic of the Congo	56105.91
1493844.78	Zimbabwe	31019.31
1435881.55	Sri Lanka	38403.85
1428884.00	Somalia	32499.94
1423800.03	Cameroon	39377.19
1383915.31	Paraguay	41624.56
1378254.73	Madagascar	33150.78
1374669.15	Dominican Republic	48396.21
1365565.35	Yemen	32242.87
1363397.31	Puerto Rico	16063.99
1362512.87	Trinidad and Tobago	34187.02
1341001.86	Cambodia	48774.83
1299279.38	Uganda	53370.99
1298190.80	Georgia	19049.15
1270720.14	Bosnia and Herzegovina	29397.99
1146720.17	Guatemala	43981.07
1133046.84	Kyrgyzstan	21698.23
1110170.13	Moldova	13542.41
1084615.10	Mali	45463.10
1068104.54	Slovenia	15993.52
1053097.98	Gabon	21402.08
1000107.77	Niger	42334.09
998735.71	Ghana	48265.93
985225.30	Jordan	33407.71
976936.10	Afghanistan	29460.05
943164.54	Zambia	30484.45
922486.17	Lebanon	24672.32
919320.02	Latvia	10957.49
882324.62	Burkina Faso	34456.82
877832.63	Tajikistan	21438.12
857017.97	Ivory Coast	32184.01
792752.05	Mozambique	33953.98
786169.96	Congo	23702.01
781374.99	Senegal	28843.73
725214.16	Laos	42056.21
699475.83	Honduras	22920.14
695153.06	Nicaragua	20628.27
675479.38	Armenia	10836.34
671034.35	Luxembourg	7860.93
669247.28	Guinea	28634.66
644933.21	North Macedonia	11370.03
600082.69	Costa Rica	16468.14
585550.48	Panama	21281.69
508021.46	Haiti	13656.96
504271.46	Jamaica	8162.92
502044.24	El Salvador	13051.31
491961.39	Albania	7673.67
491097.45	Mauritania	16509.27
474495.95	Botswana	12712.76
449989.96	Namibia	12885.68
435052.80	Malawi	19714.05
429474.63	Central African Republic	12502.62
417591.52	Brunei	12157.94
401145.94	Benin	16699.49
358262.78	Cyprus	10324.66
353277.63	Equatorial Guinea	6982.10
342376.35	Curaçao	2532.14
307561.55	Papua New Guinea	9641.00
291818.96	Rwanda	7493.27
273274.47	Guyana	8190.99
272368.26	Eritrea	6401.82
257093.02	Togo	10612.91
244480.98	Sierra Leone	6937.72
226640.80	Iceland	4171.94
186244.71	Burundi	7049.14
163558.13	Mauritius	6198.74
157612.33	New Caledonia	6614.22
153393.47	Eswatini	3289.55
141667.31	Suriname	3737.72
133044.23	Liberia	4532.39
132045.66	Fiji	3400.99
124813.22	Lesotho	2601.92
112143.65	Malta	2033.87
111143.09	Palau	1501.65
103338.29	Guinea-Bissau	2997.48
98419.38	Réunion	2920.70
93438.80	Djibouti	2132.41
85103.78	Bhutan	3254.86
79289.89	Macao	3119.01
78923.77	Bahamas	2050.28
67670.38	The Gambia	1888.80
64176.72	East Timor	2007.18
51311.84	Guadeloupe	1462.23
44855.65	French Polynesia	1374.56
44221.42	Martinique	1218.42
42933.22	Barbados	989.04
42685.50	Maldives	3087.95
33442.29	Seychelles	1338.71
29658.60	Belize	920.35
29615.09	Cape Verde	1231.52
27385.98	Vanuatu	670.21
25456.06	Western Sahara	684.80
22056.82	Comoros	761.77
21989.27	Solomon Islands	720.82
19229.21	Samoa	646.14
18866.98	French Guiana	573.39
17568.15	Gibraltar	712.37
16288.47	Aruba	561.50
14766.98	Greenland	647.26
14302.97	Antigua and Barbuda	388.56
13273.35	Bermuda	378.84
10886.95	Tonga	342.11
10790.90	Saint Lucia	451.27
9036.14	Cayman Islands	390.14
8589.00	Falkland Islands	172.39
6637.72	São Tomé and Príncipe	303.45
6051.13	Grenada	200.41
5395.35	Saint Vincent and the Grenadines	150.78
5197.54	Dominica	146.92
5162.54	Saint Kitts and Nevis	174.47
4028.21	Cook Islands	154.32
3225.25	Kiribati	130.18
2566.31	Saint Pierre and Miquelon	46.57
2526.95	Faroe Islands	50.70
2466.18	British Virgin Islands	91.07
2000.27	Turks and Caicos Islands	110.25
824.49	Anguilla	26.21
597.13	Saint Helena, Ascension and Tristan da Cunha	21.27
1999036260.97	(United Nations) Global Total	52962900.86
244915040.75	European Union	3221794.61
18317017.35	International Aviation	498178.11
27625025.24	International Shipping	746943.68

== See also ==
- List of countries by carbon dioxide emissions per capita
- List of countries by carbon intensity of GDP
- List of countries by renewable electricity production
- List of countries by greenhouse gas emissions per capita
- List of locations and entities by greenhouse gas emissions
- United Nations | Sustainable Development Goal 13 – Climate action
