= Jim Bunning =

American baseball player and politician (1931–2017)

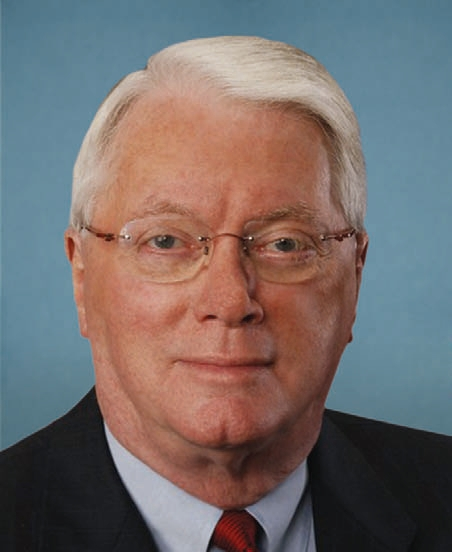
- Official portrait, c. 2008–2009

United States Senator from Kentucky
- In office January 3, 1999 – January 3, 2011
- Preceded by: Wendell Ford
- Succeeded by: Rand Paul

Member of the U.S. House of Representatives from Kentucky's 4th district
- In office January 3, 1987 – January 3, 1999
- Preceded by: Gene Snyder
- Succeeded by: Ken Lucas

Member of the Kentucky Senate from the 11th district
- In office January 1, 1980 – January 1, 1984
- Preceded by: Donald L. Johnson
- Succeeded by: Art Schmidt

Personal details
- Born: James Paul David Bunning; October 23, 1931 Southgate, Kentucky, U.S.
- Died: May 26, 2017 (aged 85) Fort Thomas, Kentucky, U.S.
- Party: Republican
- Spouse: Mary Theis (m. 1952)
- Children: 9
- Education: Xavier University (BA)
- Bunning's voice Bunning speaks in support of the confirmation of Alberto Gonzales as United States attorney general Recorded February 2, 2005 Baseball career
- Pitcher
- Batted: Right Threw: Right

MLB debut
- July 20, 1955, for the Detroit Tigers

Last MLB appearance
- September 3, 1971, for the Philadelphia Phillies

MLB statistics
- Win–loss record: 224–184
- Earned run average: 3.27
- Strikeouts: 2,855
- Stats at Baseball Reference

Teams
- Detroit Tigers (1955–1963); Philadelphia Phillies (1964–1967); Pittsburgh Pirates (1968–1969); Los Angeles Dodgers (1969); Philadelphia Phillies (1970–1971)

Career highlights and awards
- 9× All-Star (1957, 1959, 1961–1964, 1966); AL wins leader (1957); 3× Strikeout leader (1959, 1960, 1967); Pitched a perfect game on June 21, 1964; Pitched a no-hitter on July 20, 1958; Philadelphia Phillies No. 14 retired; Philadelphia Phillies Wall of Fame

Member of the National

Baseball Hall of Fame
- Induction: 1996
- Vote: Veterans Committee

James Paul David Bunning (October 23, 1931 – May 26, 2017) was an American professional baseball pitcher and politician from Kentucky who served in both chambers of the United States Congress, a member of the United States House of Representatives from 1987 to 1999 and a member of the United States Senate from 1999 to 2011. He is the only Major League Baseball athlete to have been elected to both the United States Senate and the National Baseball Hall of Fame to date.

Bunning pitched from 1955 to 1971 for the Detroit Tigers, Philadelphia Phillies, Pittsburgh Pirates, and Los Angeles Dodgers. When Bunning retired, he had the second-highest total career strikeouts in Major League history; he currently ranks 22nd. As a member of the Phillies, Bunning pitched the seventh perfect game in Major League Baseball history on June 21, 1964, the first game of a Father's Day doubleheader at Shea Stadium, against the New York Mets. It was the first perfect game in the National League since 1880. Bunning was inducted into the National Baseball Hall of Fame and Museum in 1996 after election by the Hall's Veterans Committee.

After retiring from baseball, Bunning returned to his native northern Kentucky and was elected to the Fort Thomas city council, then the Kentucky Senate, in which he served as minority leader. In 1983, Bunning was the Republican nominee for governor of Kentucky. In 1986, Bunning was elected to the House of Representatives from Kentucky's 4th congressional district, and served in the House from 1987 to 1999. He was elected to the Senate from Kentucky in 1998, and served two terms as the Republican junior U.S. senator. In July 2009, he announced that he would not run for re-election the following year. Bunning gave his farewell speech to the Senate on December 9, 2010, and was succeeded by fellow Republican Rand Paul on January 3, 2011.

== Education and family ==
Bunning was born in Southgate, Kentucky, the son of Gladys (née Best) and Louis Aloysius Bunning. He graduated from St. Xavier High School in Cincinnati in 1949 and received a bachelor's degree in economics from Xavier University in 1953. Like a large percentage of residents in the Northern Kentucky region, the Bunning family was Roman Catholic.

In 1952, Bunning married Mary Catherine Theis. They had five daughters and four sons. One of Bunning's sons, David Bunning, is a federal judge for the United States District Court for the Eastern District of Kentucky, who presided over the Kim Davis case, Miller v. Davis. Jim and Mary Catherine also have 35 grandchildren and 14 great-grandchildren, as of 2013. One of those grandchildren is Patrick Towles, a former starting quarterback for the University of Kentucky football team.

== Professional baseball career ==
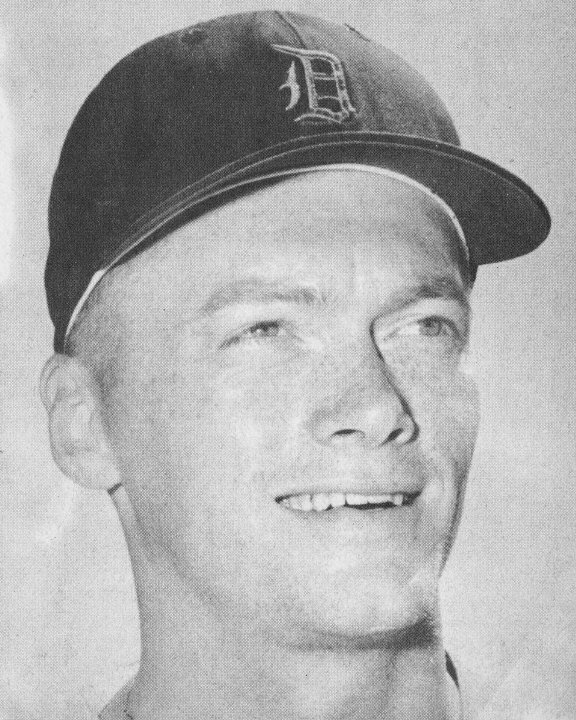
Bunning as a Detroit Tigers rookie in 1955

After pitching for the Xavier Musketeers as a freshman, Bunning signed a professional contract with the Detroit Tigers, though he continued to attend classes at Xavier. Bunning played in Minor League Baseball from 1950 through 1954 and part of the 1955 season, when the Tigers club described him as having "an excellent curve ball, a confusing delivery and a sneaky fast ball". His first game in the major leagues was on July 20, 1955, with the Detroit Tigers. He had his breakout season in 1957, when he led the American League in wins (20) and innings pitched (267 1/3), and was the starting pitcher for the AL in the All-Star Game. Bunning pitched his first no-hitter on July 20, 1958, for the Tigers against the Boston Red Sox. On August 2, 1959, Bunning struck out three batters on nine pitches in the ninth inning of a 5–4 loss to the Boston Red Sox. Bunning became the fifth American League pitcher and the 10th pitcher in Major League history to accomplish an immaculate inning.

Bunning pitched for the Detroit Tigers through 1963. During the 1963 Winter Meetings, the Tigers traded Bunning and Gus Triandos to the Philadelphia Phillies for Don Demeter and Jack Hamilton. In his first season with the Phillies, Bunning entered play on June 21 with a 6–2 record on the season. He was opposed on the mound by Tracy Stallard in the first game of a doubleheader. Through the first four innings, Bunning totaled four strikeouts through 12 batters. In the fifth inning, Phillies second baseman Tony Taylor preserved the perfect game with his strong defensive play. A diving catch and a throw from the knees kept Mets catcher Jesse Gonder off the bases. Bunning also had a good day at the plate, hitting a double and driving in two runs in the sixth inning. By the end of the game, even the Mets fans were cheering Bunning's effort; he had reached a three-ball count on only two batters, and retired shortstop Charley Smith on a pop-out, and pinch-hitters George Altman and John Stephenson on strikeouts, to complete the perfect game.

Bunning, who at the time had seven children, said that his game, pitched on Father's Day (although Father's Day did not officially become a holiday until 1972), could not have come at a more appropriate time. He remarked that his slider was his best pitch, "'just like the no-hitter I pitched for Detroit six years ago'". Bunning posted the first regular-season perfect game since Charlie Robertson in 1922 (Don Larsen's perfect game was in the 1956 World Series). The Phillies also won the second game of the doubleheader, 8–2, behind Rick Wise, who earned his first major league victory in his first start.

Bunning's perfect game was the first thrown by a National League pitcher since 1880. It was also the first no-hitter by a Phillies pitcher since Johnny Lush no-hit the Brooklyn Superbas on May 1, 1906. He is one of only seven pitchers to have thrown both a perfect game and an additional no-hitter, the others being Randy Johnson, Sandy Koufax, Addie Joss, Cy Young, Mark Buehrle, and fellow Phillie Roy Halladay, whose additional no-hitter came in Game 1 of the 2010 National League Division Series. He is one of five players to have thrown a no-hitter in both leagues, the others being Young, Johnson, Nolan Ryan, and Hideo Nomo. Bunning was the first pitcher to pitch a no-hitter, win 100 games, and record 1,000 strikeouts in both leagues.

Bunning is remembered for his role in the pennant race of 1964, in which the Phillies held a commanding lead in the National League for most of the season, eventually losing the title to the St. Louis Cardinals. Manager Gene Mauch used Bunning and fellow hurler Chris Short heavily down the stretch, and the two became visibly fatigued as September wore on. With a 6 1/2-game lead as late as September 21, they lost 10 straight games to finish tied for second place.

Jim Bunning's number 14 was retired by the Philadelphia Phillies in 2001.

Bunning pitched for Philadelphia through 1967, when the Phillies began to rebuild. The Phillies traded him to the Pittsburgh Pirates before the 1968 season for four players, including Woodie Fryman and Don Money. He pitched for Pittsburgh into the 1969 season, and finished the 1969 season with the Los Angeles Dodgers. Bunning then returned to the Phillies in 1970 and retired in 1971.

Bunning's 2,855 career strikeouts put him in second place on the all-time list at the time of his retirement, behind only Walter Johnson. His mark was later surpassed by other pitchers, and he is currently 22nd all-time. Despite year in and year out putting up excellent numbers, Bunning rarely led the league in any pitching categories. He never led the league in ERA; the only year he led the league in wins (20, in 1957, with the Detroit Tigers) was the only year he ever won 20 or more games; he did, however, lead the league in strikeouts three times (with 201 in 1959 and 1960, and 253 in 1967). He never won a Cy Young Award; the closest he would come was in 1967, his best year, when at age 35, he came in second behind Mike McCormick. He finished with a middling 17–15 record, but posted a career-best ERA (2.29), and led the league in shutouts (6), games started and innings pitched (40/302.1), and strikeouts (253). It was the only year in his career he earned any Cy Young Award votes. He did, however, win the NL Player of the Month Award in June 1964, the month of his perfect game (3–0, 2.20 ERA, 42 SO).

In 1984, Bunning was elected to the Philadelphia Baseball Wall of Fame. In 1996 he was elected to the Baseball Hall of Fame via the Veterans Committee. In 2001, his uniform number, #14, was retired by the Phillies.

After retiring as a player, Bunning began managing in the minor leagues for the Phillies organization. He managed the Reading Phillies, Eugene Emeralds, Toledo Mud Hens, and Oklahoma City 89ers from 1972 through 1976.

== Players union involvement ==
From the mid-1960s until his retirement from baseball, Bunning was active in the Major League Baseball Players Association (MLBPA), and played a major role in transforming the organization into one of the country's most successful labor unions.

Though the MLBPA had been formed in the early 1950s as an attempt to improve pay, benefits, and working conditions for players, team owners were still largely able to impose their will on the players by acting in concert to limit salaries and refrain from offering first rate employee benefits and working conditions, such as suitable stadium locker rooms and a per diem allowance to pay for meals while traveling for away games. At the time, the starting salary was about $47,000 in current dollars ($6,000 in 1965), and the average salary was about $112,000 ($14,000 in 1965). As a result, many players had to work in the off season. The owners also offered a substandard pension plan which provided low payments to retirees, and for which most players were ineligible. Many spring training playing fields were unsafe, and lodging and dining facilities were often racially segregated.

Bunning became active with the MLBPA early in his career, including serving as the pension representative for the American League players and a member of the union's executive board. In 1965, Bunning joined with Robin Roberts, a founder of the MLBPA, to hire a full-time executive director. They agreed on Marvin Miller, then an economist with the United Steelworkers. They convinced the players union to hire Miller, and he remained in the position until 1983. Under Miller's direction, in 1968 the MLBPA negotiated its first collective bargaining agreement with the owners, which put the players on the path to improved salaries, benefits, and working conditions. By the time Bunning retired, the minimum salary and average salary for major league players had nearly doubled. By 2015, the minimum salary was over $500,000 and the average salary was over $4 million. Over time, the MLBPA also succeeded at eliminating the reserve clause and Major League Baseball's exemption from antitrust laws. As a result, players were able to negotiate for the right to veto trades, as well as the right to declare free agency and offer their services to the highest bidder.

After retiring, Bunning represented players individually as a sports agent. He eventually represented as many as 30 players at one time.

At the time of Bunning's death, Tony Clark, then serving as MLBPA's executive director, praised Bunning's union activities: "Recognizing the need to ensure that all players receive fair representation in their dealings with major league club owners, Jim, along with a number of his peers, helped pave the way for generations of players."

== Political career ==
Bunning was raised in a household supportive of the Democratic Party. While attending Xavier University, he joined the Republican Party.

=== Local and state positions ===
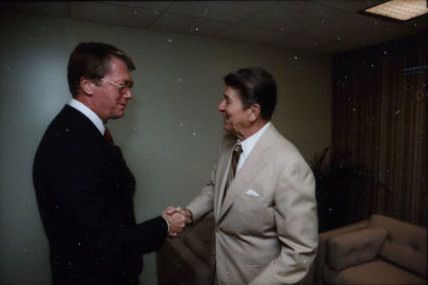
Bunning greeting President Ronald Reagan in 1983

First elected to office in 1977, Bunning served two years on the non-partisan city council of Fort Thomas, Kentucky, before running for and winning a seat in the Kentucky Senate as a Republican. He was elected minority leader by his Republican colleagues, a rare feat for a freshman legislator.

Bunning was the Republican candidate for Governor of Kentucky in 1983. He and his running mate Eugene P. Stuart lost in the general election to Democrat Martha Layne Collins.

=== House of Representatives ===
In 1986, Bunning won the Republican nomination in Kentucky's 4th congressional district, based in Kentucky's share of the Cincinnati metro area, after 10-term incumbent Republican Gene Snyder retired. He won easily in November and was reelected five more times without serious opposition in what was considered the most Republican district in Kentucky. After the Republicans gained control of the House in 1995, Bunning served as chairman of the House Ways and Means Subcommittee on Social Security until 1999.

=== First Senate term ===
In 1998, Senate Minority Whip Wendell Ford decided to retire after 24 years in the Senate—at the time, the longest term in Kentucky history (a record later surpassed by Mitch McConnell). Bunning won the Republican nomination for the seat, and faced fellow Congressman Scotty Baesler, a Democrat from the Lexington-based 6th District, in the general election. Bunning defeated Baesler by just over half a percentage point. The race was very close; Bunning only won by swamping Baesler in the 4th by a margin that Baesler couldn't make up in the rest of the state (Baesler barely won the 6th).

Bunning was one of the Senate's most conservative members, gaining high marks from several conservative interest groups. He was ranked by National Journal as the second-most conservative United States Senator in their March 2007 conservative/liberal rankings, after Sen. Jim DeMint (R-SC).

Among the bills that Bunning sponsored is the Bunning-Bereuter-Blumenauer Flood Insurance Reform Act of 2004.

=== 2004 Senate race ===
Bunning was heavily favored for a second term in 2004 after his expected Democratic opponent, Governor Paul Patton, saw his career implode in a scandal over an extramarital affair. The Democrats chose Daniel Mongiardo, a relatively unknown physician and state senator from Hazard. Bunning had an estimated $4 million campaign war chest, while Mongiardo had only $600,000. However, due to a number of controversial incidents involving Bunning, the Democrats began increasing financial support to Mongiardo. Therein when it became apparent that Bunning's bizarre behavior was costing him votes, the Democrats purchased additional television airtime on Mongiardo's behalf.

During his reelection bid, controversy erupted when Bunning described Mongiardo as looking "like one of Saddam Hussein's sons." Public pressure compelled him to apologize. Bunning was also criticized for his use of a teleprompter during a televised debate with Mongiardo where Bunning participated via satellite link, refusing to appear in person. Bunning was further criticized for making an unsubstantiated claim that his wife had been attacked by Mongiardo's supporters, and for calling Mongiardo "limp wristed". Bunning's mental health was also questioned during the campaign.

In October 2004 Bunning told reporters "Let me explain something: I don't watch the national news, and I don't read the paper. I haven't done that for the last six weeks. I watch Fox News to get my information."

Bunning won by just over one percentage point after the western portion of the state broke heavily for him. Mongiardo retained a narrow lead with as much as 80 percent of the vote counted. However, he could not overcome Bunning's lead in the western portion of the state (which is in the Central Time Zone) as well as George W. Bush easily carrying the state.

=== Second Senate term ===
As was expected in light of Bunning's previous career as a baseball player, he was very interested in Congress's investigation of steroid use in baseball. Bunning was also outspoken on the issue of illegal immigration, taking the position that all illegal immigrants should be deported. Bunning was also the only member of the United States Senate Committee on Banking, Housing, and Urban Affairs to have opposed Ben Bernanke for Chief of the Federal Reserve. He said it was because he had doubts that Bernanke would be any different from Alan Greenspan.

In April 2006, Time magazine called him one of America's Five Worst Senators. The magazine dubbed him 'The Underperformer' for his "lackluster performance", saying he "shows little interest in policy unless it involves baseball", and criticized his hostility towards staff and fellow senators and his "bizarre behavior" during his 2004 campaign.

On December 6, 2006, only Bunning and Rick Santorum voted against the confirmation of Robert Gates as United States Secretary of Defense, with Bunning saying that "Mr. Gates has repeatedly criticized our efforts in Iraq and Afghanistan without providing any viable solutions to the problems our troops currently face. We need a secretary of defense to think forward with solutions and not backward on history we cannot change."

Bunning reportedly blocked the move to restore public access to the records of past United States Presidents which had been removed under Executive Order 13233.

In January 2009, Bunning missed more than a week of the start of Congress. Bunning said by phone that he was fulfilling "a family commitment six months ago to do certain things, and I'm doing them." Asked whether he would say where he was, Bunning replied: "No, I'd rather not."

In February 2009, at the Hardin County Republican Party's Lincoln Day Dinner, while discussing conservative judges, Bunning predicted that Supreme Court Justice Ruth Bader Ginsburg would likely be dead from pancreatic cancer within nine months. Bunning later apologized if he had offended Ginsburg with his remarks and offered his thoughts and prayers to Ginsburg. In an NPR interview in July 2019, Ginsburg noted that he was dead, and she was "very much alive".

Bunning was the only senator to miss the Senate's historic Christmas Eve 2009 vote on the health care reform bill; he cited family commitments as his reason for missing the vote. The bill passed without any Republican votes, 60–39.

On February 25, 2010, Bunning objected to a proposal of unanimous consent for an extension of unemployment insurance, COBRA, and other federal programs, citing that this extension was not pay-as-you-go. He proposed an amendment which sought to find the funds to pay for the bill from the Stimulus Bill of 2009, and declared that he supported the unemployed, but that a bill such as this only adds to the growing deficit and that it should be paid for immediately.

I have offered to do the same thing for the same amount of time. The only difference that I have. ... is that I believe we should pay for it. ... There are going to be other bills brought to this floor that are not going to be paid for, and I'm going to object every time they do it.

Senator Bob Corker joined Bunning, while other senators worked to cease his objections until 11:48 p.m. EST. When Senator Jeff Merkley urged him to drop his objections to vote on a 30-day extension of benefits, Bunning responded "tough shit." On March 2, Bunning finally agreed to end his objection to the bill in exchange for a vote on his amendment to pay for the package. It failed 53–43 on a procedural vote. The extension of unemployment benefits then passed by a vote of 78–19.

=== Aborted 2010 re-election campaign ===
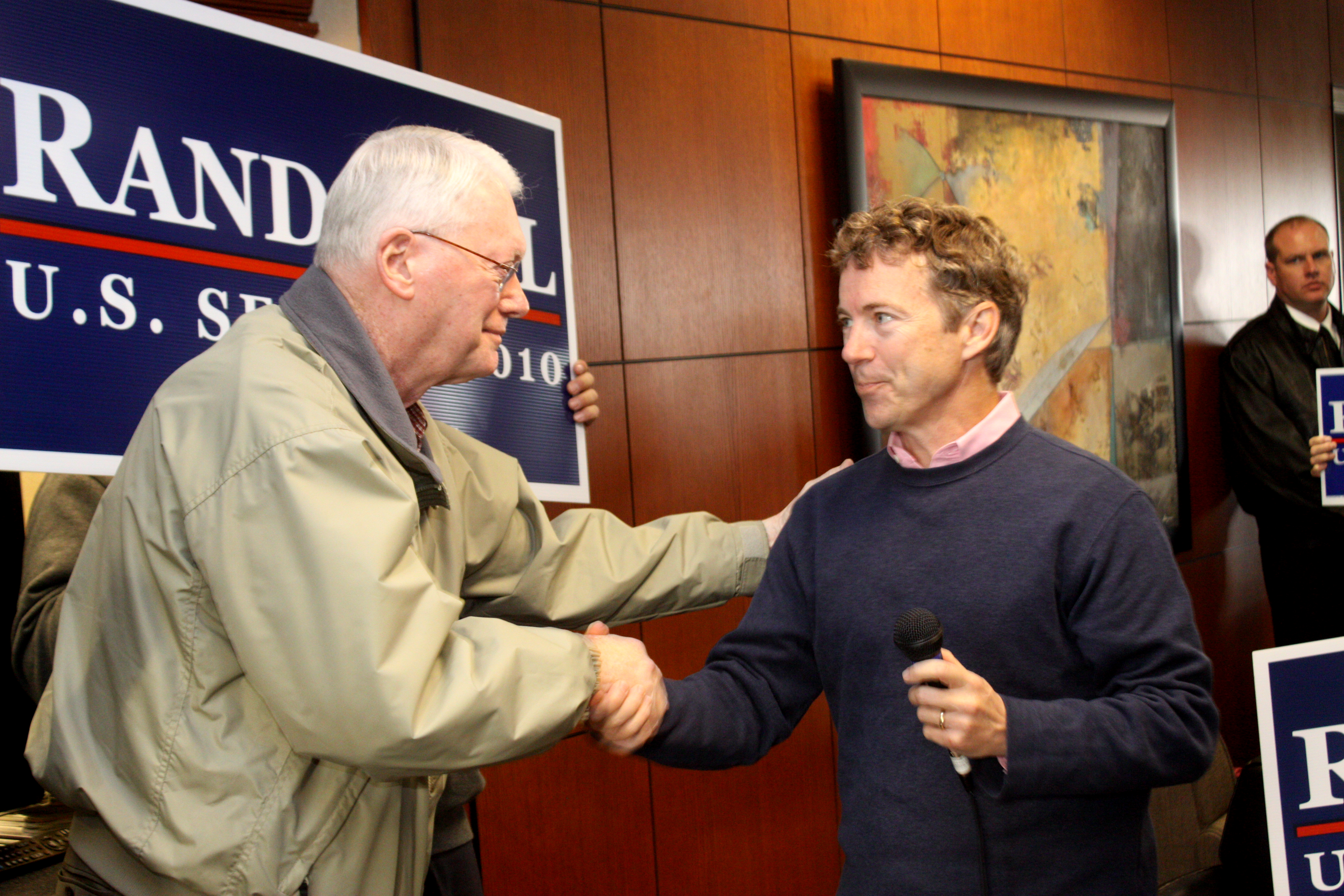
Bunning with his eventual successor, Rand Paul

In January 2009, when asked whether Bunning was the best candidate to run or whether there were better GOP candidates for Bunning's Senate seat, National Republican Senatorial Committee Chairman John Cornyn said: "I don't know. I think it's really up to Senator Bunning." Bunning replied: "Anybody can run for anything they choose. I am gearing up, and I look forward to the challenge of taking on whoever comes out of the Democrat primary in May of 2010." Kentucky State Senate President David L. Williams was reportedly considering running against Bunning in the primary. Bunning responded by threatening to sue the National Republican Senatorial Committee if they recruited a candidate to run against him in the primary. He also attacked NRSC Chairman John Cornyn:

The NRSC never helped me last time and they're probably not going to help me this time ... [David Williams] owes me $30,000 and he said he'll repay me. I was short in my FEC money and he asked me if I would help save two state senate seats ... I told him if I did it I would have to have it replaced at the first of the year. So far he has not.

As of the end of September 2008, Bunning had $175,000 in his campaign account. By comparison, all other Republican senators facing competitive 2010 races had at least $850,000 at that point. In the last quarter of 2008, the senator's campaign committee Citizens for Bunning had raised $27,000 from 26 separate contributions, ending the year with $150,000 in cash. In mid-April, KYWORDSMITH.com reported that of the $263,000 that Bunning collected during the first quarter of 2009, over 77% ($203,383) was received from out of state, while over 10% ($28,100) was actually untouchable for another 13 months as it was contributed exclusively for use in a general election. Bunning had two fund raisers scheduled in the first half of April.

In an April 2009 poll, Bunning's approval rating was just 28%, and he trailed the four most likely Democratic candidates in hypothetical contests. 54% of voters in the state disapproved of Bunning's performance. Kentucky Secretary of State Trey Grayson announced on April 30, 2009, that he would form an exploratory committee to run for Bunning's seat. It was speculated that this was a precursor to Bunning's retirement. "He (Bunning) told Trey to do this", one senior congressional official said of Bunning. "Why else would he tell his main rival to prepare for a run?" However, Bunning said at a Lincoln Day dinner in Kentucky on May 9 that he still planned to run: "The battle is going to be long, but I am prepared to fight for my values."

In a press conference on May 19, Bunning called fellow Kentuckian and U.S. Senate Minority Leader Mitch McConnell a "control freak": "If Mitch McConnell doesn't endorse me, it could be the best thing that ever happened to me in Kentucky."

On July 27, 2009, Bunning announced he would not run for re-election in 2010, blaming fellow Republicans for doing "everything in their power to dry up my fundraising." On April 14, 2010, in a further show of disdain for GOP leadership and insiders, Bunning announced his support for outsider candidate Rand Paul over establishment favorite Trey Grayson.

=== Committee assignments ===
- Committee on Banking, Housing, and Urban Affairs
  - Subcommittee on Financial Institutions
  - Subcommittee on Securities, Insurance and Investment (Ranking Member)
- Committee on the Budget
- Committee on Energy and Natural Resources
  - Subcommittee on Energy
  - Subcommittee on National Parks
  - Subcommittee on Water and Power
- Committee on Finance
  - Subcommittee on Health Care
  - Subcommittee on Energy, Natural Resources, and Infrastructure (Ranking Member)
  - Subcommittee on International Trade, Customs, and Global Competitiveness

== Jim Bunning Foundation ==
On December 18, 2008, the Lexington Herald Leader reported that Sen. Bunning's non-profit foundation, the Jim Bunning Foundation, has given less than 25 percent of its proceeds to charity. The charity has taken in $504,000 since 1996, according to Senate and tax records; during that period, Senator Bunning was paid $180,000 in salary by the foundation while working a reported one hour per week. Bunning Foundation board members include his wife Mary, and Cincinnati tire dealer Bob Sumerel. In 2008, records indicate that Bunning attended 10 baseball shows around the country and signed autographs, generating $61,631 in income for the charity.

== Death and burial ==
Bunning died at St. Elizabeth Hospice in Edgewood, Kentucky on May 26, 2017, aged 85, following a stroke he suffered in October 2016. Following a funeral service at Cathedral Basilica of the Assumption in Covington, Kentucky, Bunning was interred at St. Stephen Cemetery in Campbell County, Kentucky.

== Electoral history ==
Kentucky's 4th congressional district: Results 1986–1996
| Year | Democrat | Votes | Pct | Republican | Votes | Pct | |
|---|---|---|---|---|---|---|---|
| 1986 | Terry L. Mann | 53,906 | 44% | Jim Bunning | 67,626 | 56% | * |
| 1988 | Richard V. Beliles | 50,575 | 26% | Jim Bunning | 145,609 | 74% | |
| 1990 | Galen Martin | 44,979 | 31% | Jim Bunning | 101,680 | 69% | |
| 1992 | Floyd G. Poore | 86,890 | 38% | Jim Bunning | 139,634 | 62% | |
| 1994 | Sally Harris Skaggs | 33,717 | 26% | Jim Bunning | 96,695 | 74% | |
| 1996 | Denny Bowman | 68,939 | 32% | Jim Bunning | 149,135 | 68% | |

*In 1986, Walter T. Marksberry received 735 votes, W. Ed Parker received 485 votes, and other write-ins received 11 votes.

Kentucky Senator (Class III) results: 1998–2004
| Year | Democrat | Votes | Pct | Republican | Votes | Pct | 3rd Party | Party | Votes | Pct |
|---|---|---|---|---|---|---|---|---|---|---|
| 1998 | Scotty Baesler | 563,051 | 49.2% | Jim Bunning | 569,817 | 49.7% | Charles R. Arbegust | Reform | 12,546 | 1.1% |
| 2004 | Daniel Mongiardo | 850,855 | 49% | Jim Bunning | 873,507 | 51% | | | | |

== Awards ==
In 2005, Bunning received the United States Sports Academy's highest honor, the Eagle Award, which is given in recognition of an individual's significant contributions to international sport.

The 1996 Major League Baseball All-Star Game, held in Philadelphia, was dedicated to Bunning and fellow Phillies legends Richie Ashburn, Steve Carlton, Robin Roberts and Mike Schmidt, all of whom threw out the ceremonial first pitch.

== See also ==
- Jim Bunning's perfect game
- Major League Baseball titles leaders
- List of Major League Baseball annual wins leaders
- List of Major League Baseball annual strikeout leaders
- List of Major League Baseball career wins leaders
- List of Major League Baseball career strikeout leaders
- List of Major League Baseball career shutout leaders
- List of Major League Baseball no-hitters
- List of Major League Baseball perfect games
- List of Major League Baseball retired numbers
- Abraham Lincoln Bicentennial Commission

Awards and achievements
| Preceded by Bob Keegan; Sandy Koufax | No-hitter pitcher July 20, 1958; June 21, 1964 | Succeeded by Hoyt Wilhelm; Jim Maloney |
| Preceded by Don Larsen | Perfect game pitcher June 21, 1964 | Succeeded by Sandy Koufax |
| Preceded by Billy Williams | Major League Player of the Month; June 1964 | Succeeded by Ron Santo |
Party political offices
| Preceded by Louie B. Nunn | Republican nominee for Governor of Kentucky; 1983 | Succeeded by John Harper |
| Preceded by David Williams | Republican nominee for U.S. Senator from Kentucky (Class 3); 1998, 2004 | Succeeded by Rand Paul |
U.S. House of Representatives
| Preceded by Gene Snyder | Member of the U.S. House of Representatives from Kentucky's 4th congressional district 1987–1999 | Succeeded by Ken Lucas |
U.S. Senate
| Preceded by Wendell Ford | U.S. Senator (Class 3) from Kentucky; 1999–2011; Served alongside: Mitch McConnell | Succeeded by Rand Paul |
