= United States Senate Finance Subcommittee on Fiscal Responsibility and Economic Growth =

The Senate Finance Subcommittee on Fiscal Responsibility and Economic Growth is one of the five subcommittees within the Senate Committee on Finance, having been created on February 16, 2011, during the 111th Congress.

== Members, 119th Congress ==
Majority	Minority
Ron Johnson, Wisconsin, Chair; Bill Cassidy, Louisiana	Tina Smith, Minnesota, Ranking Member
Ex officio
Mike Crapo, Idaho	Ron Wyden, Oregon

== Historical membership rosters ==
=== 118th Congress ===
Majority	Minority
Maggie Hassan, New Hampshire, Chair; Elizabeth Warren, New Hampshire	Chuck Grassley, Iowa, Ranking Member; Bill Cassidy, Louisiana
Ex officio
Ron Wyden, Oregon	Mike Crapo, Idaho

=== 117th Congress ===
Majority	Minority
Maggie Hassan, New Hampshire, Chair	Chuck Grassley, Iowa, Ranking Member
Ex officio
Ron Wyden, Oregon	Mike Crapo, Idaho
