= Harmful Algal Bloom and Hypoxia Research and Control Amendments Act of 2014 =

U.S. public law

- Long title: To amend the Harmful Algal Blooms and Hypoxia Research and Control Act of 1998, and for other purposes.
- Announced in: the 113th United States Congress
- Sponsored by: Sen. Bill Nelson (D, FL)
- Number of co-sponsors: 10

Citations
- Public law: Pub. L. 113–121 (text) (PDF)

Codification
- Acts affected: Harmful Algal Bloom and Hypoxia Research and Control Act of 1998, Integrated Coastal and Ocean Observation System Act of 2009
- U.S.C. sections affected: 33 U.S.C. § 3601 et seq., 16 U.S.C. § 1451
- Agencies affected: National Oceanic and Atmospheric Administration, Executive Office of the President, United States Environmental Protection Agency, Centers for Disease Control and Prevention, United States Congress, United States Department of State
- Authorizations of appropriations: $102,500,000 for each of fiscal years 2014, 2015, 2016, 2017 and 2018

Legislative history
- Introduced in the Senate as S. 1254 by Sen. Bill Nelson (D, FL) on June 27, 2013; Committee consideration by United States Senate Committee on Commerce, Science and Transportation, United States House Committee on Science, Space and Technology, United States House Committee on Natural Resources, United States House Science Subcommittee on Environment, United States House Natural Resources Subcommittee on Fisheries, Wildlife, Oceans and Insular Affairs; Passed the Senate on February 12, 2014 (unanimous consent); Passed the House on June 9, 2014 (voice vote) with amendment; Senate agreed to House amendment on June 17, 2014 (Unanimous consent); Signed into law by President Barack Obama on June 30, 2014

The Harmful Algal Bloom and Hypoxia Research and Control Amendments Act of 2014 (S. 1254; Pub. L. 113–121 (text) (PDF)) is a U.S. public law that reauthorizes and modifies the Harmful Algal Bloom and Hypoxia Research and Control Act of 1998 and would authorize the appropriation of $20.5 million annually through 2018 for the National Oceanic and Atmospheric Administration (NOAA) to mitigate the harmful effects of algal blooms and hypoxia.

The bill was introduced into the United States Senate during the 113th United States Congress.

== Background ==
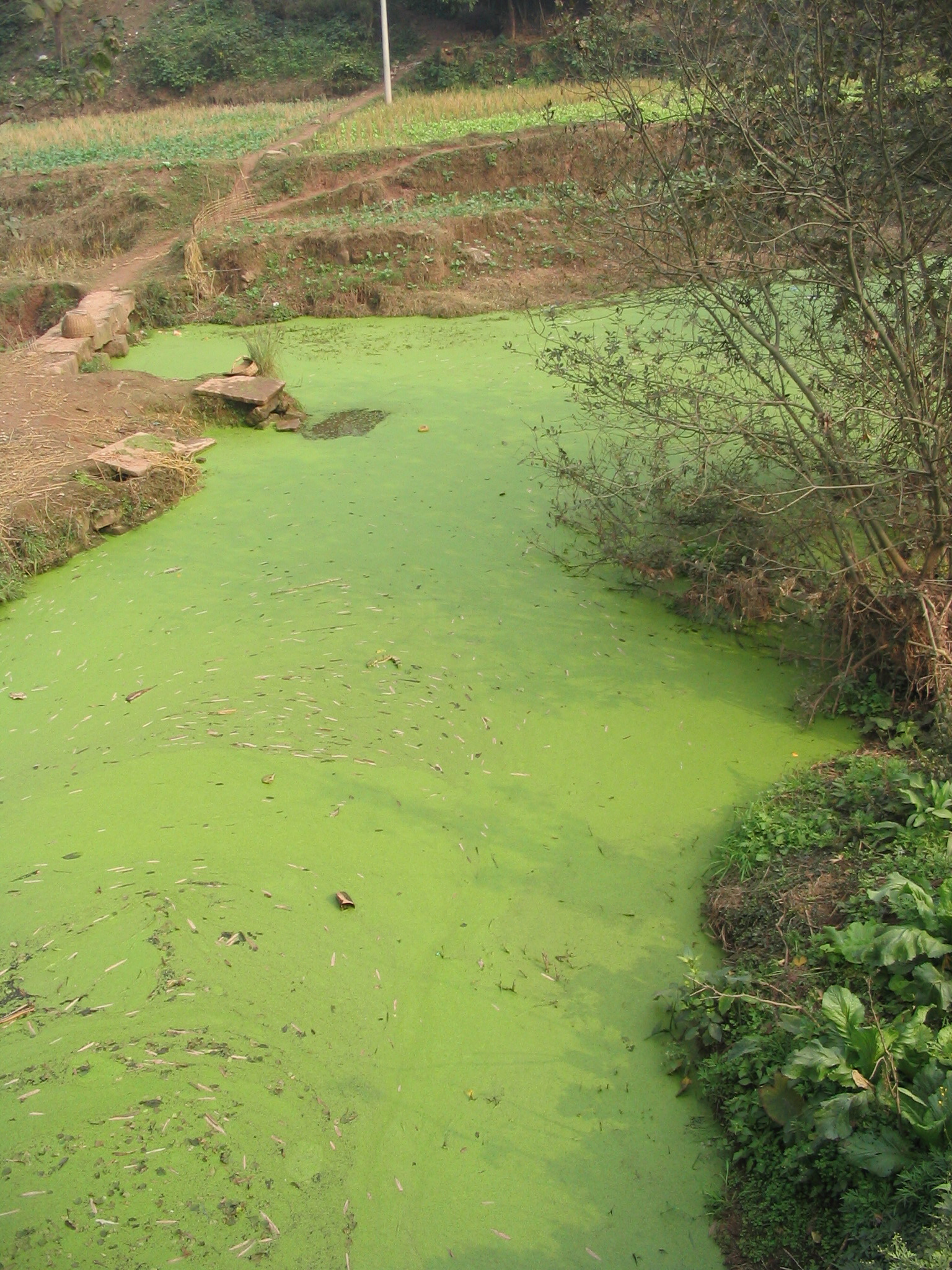
Algal blooms can present problems for ecosystems and human society.

An algal bloom is a rapid increase or accumulation in the population of algae (typically microscopic) in an aquatic system. Algal blooms may occur in freshwater as well as marine environments. Freshwater algal blooms are the result of an excess of nutrients, particularly some phosphates. Harmful algal blooms are algal bloom events involving toxic or otherwise harmful phytoplankton such as dinoflagellates of the genus Alexandrium and Karenia or diatoms of the genus Pseudo-nitzschia. is an algal bloom that causes negative impacts to other organisms via production of natural toxins, mechanical damage to other organisms, or by other means. HABs are often associated with large-scale marine mortality events and have been associated with various types of shellfish poisonings. Such blooms often take on a red or brown hue and are known colloquially as red tides. It is unclear what causes HABs; their occurrence in some locations appears to be entirely natural, while in others they appear to be a result of human activities.

The program created by the Harmful Algal Bloom and Hypoxia Research and Control Act "has served as the federal government's research and response framework for harmful algal blooms." A report by the NOAA indicated that "U.S. seafood and tourism industries suffer annual losses of $82 million due to economic impacts of HABs."

== Provisions of the bill ==
This summary is based largely on the summary provided by the Congressional Research Service, a public domain source.

The Harmful Algal Bloom and Hypoxia Research and Control Amendments Act of 2014 would, in section 3, amend the Harmful Algal Bloom and Hypoxia Research and Control Act of 1998 to revise the membership requirements for the Inter-Agency Task Force on Harmful Algal Blooms and Hypoxia to require the Task Force to have a representative from the Centers for Disease Control and Prevention (CDC).

Section 4 would require the Under Secretary of Commerce for Oceans and Atmosphere, acting through the Task Force, to: (1) establish maintain, and periodically review a national harmful algal bloom and hypoxia program, and (2) develop and submit to Congress a comprehensive research plan and action strategy to address marine and freshwater harmful algal blooms and hypoxia.

The bill would establish additional Task Force functions, including: (1) expediting the interagency review process; and (2) promoting the development of new technologies for predicting, monitoring, and mitigating harmful algal bloom and hypoxia conditions.

The bill would require the National Oceanic and Atmospheric Administration (NOAA) to have primary responsibility in administering the Program.

The bill would establish the Under Secretary's duties, including administering merit-based, competitive grant funding to: (1) maintain and enhance baseline monitoring programs established by the Program, (2) support the Program's projects, and (3) address the research and management needs and the Action Strategy's priorities.

The bill would require the Administrator of the Environmental Protection Agency (EPA) to: (1) research the ecology and impacts of freshwater harmful algal blooms; (2) forecast and monitor event response to freshwater harmful algal blooms in lakes, rivers, estuaries, and reservoirs; and (3) ensure that activities carried under this Act focus on new approaches to addressing freshwater harmful algal blooms and are not duplicative of existing research and development programs authorized by this Act or any other law.

The bill would require the collection of monitoring and observation data under this Act to comply with all data standards and protocols developed pursuant to the Integrated Coastal and Ocean Observation System Act of 2009.

Section 7 would require the Administrator, through the Mississippi River/Gulf of Mexico Watershed Nutrient Task Force, to report to appropriate congressional committees and the President on the progress made by activities directed by the Task Force and carried out or funded by EPA and other state and federal partners toward attainment of the goals of the Gulf Hypoxia Action Plan 2008 within 12 months after this Act's enactment and biennially thereafter.

Section 8 would require the Task Force to: (1) submit within 18 months to Congress and the President an integrated assessment that examines the causes, consequences, and approaches to reduce hypoxia and harmful algal blooms in the Great Lakes; and (2) develop and submit to Congress a plan, based on such assessment, for reducing, mitigating, and controlling such hypoxia and blooms.

Section 11 would authorize the departments and agencies represented on the Task Force to participate in interagency financing and share, transfer, receive, obligate, and expend funds appropriated to any member of the Task Force for the purposes of carrying out the Act.

== Congressional Budget Office report ==
This summary is based largely on the summary provided by the Congressional Budget Office, as ordered reported by the House Committee on Science, Space, and Technology on May 21, 2014. This is a public domain source.

S. 1254 would reauthorize and modify the Harmful Algal Bloom and Hypoxia Research and Control Act of 1998. The act would authorize the appropriation of $20.5 million annually through 2018 period for the National Oceanic and Atmospheric Administration (NOAA) to mitigate the harmful effects of algal blooms and hypoxia (reduced oxygen level) in certain bodies of water.

Assuming appropriation of the authorized amounts, the Congressional Budget Office (CBO) estimates that implementing the legislation would cost $78 million over the 2015-2019 period and $4 million after 2019. Enacting S. 1254 would not affect direct spending or revenues; therefore, pay-as-you-go procedures do not apply.

S. 1254 contains no intergovernmental or private-sector mandates as defined in the Unfunded Mandates Reform Act.

== Procedural history ==
The Harmful Algal Bloom and Hypoxia Research and Control Amendments Act of 2014 was introduced into the United States Senate on June 27, 2013 by Sen. Bill Nelson (D, FL). It was referred to the United States Senate Committee on Commerce, Science and Transportation. The Senate passed the bill on February 12, 2014 by unanimous consent. It was received in the United States House of Representatives on February 18, 2014 and referred to the United States House Committee on Science, Space and Technology, the United States House Committee on Natural Resources, the United States House Science Subcommittee on Environment, and the United States House Natural Resources Subcommittee on Fisheries, Wildlife, Oceans and Insular Affairs. It was reported (amended) by the House Committee on Science, Space, and Technology on June 5, 2014 alongside Report 113-471 part 1. The House passed the bill on June 9, 2014 in a voice vote. The United States Senate voted with unanimous consent to agree to the House amendments to the bill on June 17, 2014. President Barack Obama signed the bill into law on June 30, 2014.

== Debate and discussion ==
Senator Rob Portman (R-OH), who co-sponsored the bill, supported it by saying that "this legislation takes critical steps toward protecting Lake Erie and grand Lake St. Marys from harmful algae that has become a tremendous problem for our state... we cannot afford to let this threat to our tourism, fishing industries, and health go unchecked." Portman described the changes this legislation would make to the existing law, saying that "it's changed to provide more funding than has been provided in previous appropriations, but also to prioritize freshwater, and specifically talks about the Great Lakes, which it did not previously." Lake Erie, which Portman's state of Ohio borders, experienced a harmful algal bloom in 2011 and continues to have smaller ones.

The environmental organization Ocean Champions supported legislation that would address the problem of harmful algal blooms.

== See also ==
- List of bills in the 113th United States Congress
