= John Stephenson (baseball) =

American baseball player (born 1941)

- Catcher
- Born: April 13, 1941 (age 85); South Portsmouth, Kentucky, U.S.
- Batted: Left Threw: Right

MLB debut
- April 14, 1964, for the New York Mets

Last MLB appearance
- September 29, 1973, for the California Angels

MLB statistics
- Batting average: .216
- Home runs: 12
- Runs batted in: 93
- Stats at Baseball Reference

Teams
- New York Mets (1964–1966); Chicago Cubs (1967–1968); San Francisco Giants (1969–1970); California Angels (1971–1973)

John Herman Stephenson (born April 13, 1941) is an American former professional baseball player who appeared in 451 games played, primarily as a catcher and pinch hitter, in the Major Leagues from 1964 to 1973 for the New York Mets, Chicago Cubs, San Francisco Giants and California Angels. On June 21, 1964, while with the Mets, he struck out for the final out of Jim Bunning's perfect game.

Stephenson batted left-handed, threw right-handed, and was listed as 5 feet 11 inches (1.80 m) tall and 180 pounds (82 kg). Born in South Portsmouth, Kentucky, he holds a degree from William Carey College in Hattiesburg, Mississippi.

Stephenson entered pro baseball in the Mets' organization on May 30, 1963. In his finest season, 1972 with the Angels, he batted .381 (eight hits in 21 at bats), with a home run and six runs batted in, as a pinch hitter, hitting a career-best .274 overall. The previous season, also spent with the Angels, saw him set career marks in games played (98), hits (61), homers (three) and RBI (25).

Overall, Stephenson batted .216 with 214 hits, 37 doubles, three triples, 12 homers and 93 RBI. He retired from pro ball after the 1973 campaign, then went on to coach extensively in the minor leagues as well as in college baseball.
