= United States Senate Finance Subcommittee on Taxation and IRS Oversight =

The Senate Finance Subcommittee on Taxation and IRS Oversight is one of the six subcommittees within the Senate Committee on Finance.

== Members, 119th Congress ==
Majority	Minority
John Barrasso, Wyoming, Chair; Chuck Grassley, Iowa; John Cornyn, Texas; John Thune, South Dakota; Bill Cassidy, Louisiana; James Lankford, Oklahoma; Ron Johnson, Wisconsin; Thom Tillis, North Carolina; Marsha Blackburn, Tennessee	Michael Bennet, Colorado, Ranking Member; Mark Warner, Virginia; Sheldon Whitehouse, Rhode Island; Maggie Hassan, New Hampshire; Elizabeth Warren, Massachusetts; Bernie Sanders, Vermont; Ben Ray Luján, New Mexico; Raphael Warnock, Georgia
Ex officio
Mike Crapo, Idaho	Ron Wyden, Oregon

== Historical membership rosters ==
=== 118th Congress ===
Majority	Minority
Michael Bennet, Colorado, Chair; Bob Menendez, New Jersey (until August 20, 2024); Ben Cardin, Maryland; Mark Warner, Virginia; Sheldon Whitehouse, Rhode Island; Elizabeth Warren, Massachusetts	John Thune, South Dakota, Ranking Member; Chuck Grassley, Iowa; John Cornyn, Texas; James Lankford, Oklahoma; Ron Johnson, Wisconsin; Marsha Blackburn, Tennessee
Ex officio
Ron Wyden, Oregon	Mike Crapo, Idaho
