= United States Senate Finance Subcommittee on Social Security, Pensions, and Family Policy =

The Senate Finance Subcommittee on Social Security, Pensions, and Family Policy is one of the six subcommittees within the Senate Committee on Finance, within the government of the United States.

== Members, 119th Congress ==
Majority	Minority
Chuck Grassley, Iowa, Chair; Todd Young, Indiana; Marsha Blackburn, Tennessee	Bernie Sanders, Vermont, Ranking Member; Catherine Cortez Masto, Nevada
Ex officio
Mike Crapo, Idaho	Ron Wyden, Oregon

== Historical membership rosters ==
=== 118th Congress ===
Majority	Minority
Sherrod Brown, Ohio, Chair; Michael Bennet, Colorado; Elizabeth Warren, Massachusetts; Maggie Hassan, New Hampshire	Thom Tillis, North Carolina, Ranking Member; Bill Cassidy, Louisiana; Todd Young, Indiana; Marsha Blackburn, Tennessee
Ex officio
Ron Wyden, Oregon	Mike Crapo, Idaho
