= Jim Bunning's perfect game =

1964 MLB game

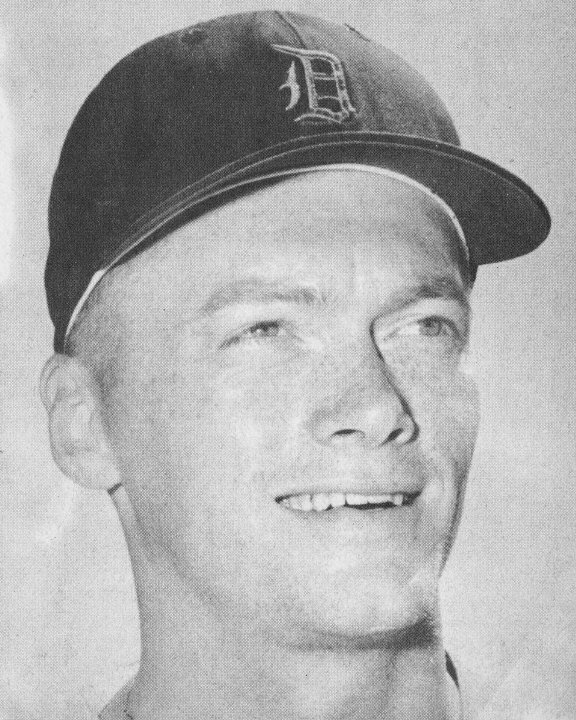
- Jim Bunning with the Detroit Tigers in 1955.
Philadelphia Phillies	New York Mets
6	0
	1	2	3	4	5	6	7	8	9	R	H	E
Philadelphia Phillies	1	1	0	0	0	4	0	0	0	6	8	0
New York Mets	0	0	0	0	0	0	0	0	0	0	0	0
- Date: June 21, 1964
- Venue: Shea Stadium
- City: Queens, New York
- Managers: Gene Mauch (Philadelphia Phillies); Casey Stengel (New York Mets)
- Umpires: HP: Ed Sudol; 1B: Paul Pryor; 2B: Frank Secory; 3B: Ken Burkhart

On June 21, 1964, Jim Bunning of the Philadelphia Phillies pitched the seventh perfect game in Major League Baseball history, defeating the New York Mets 6–0 in the first game of a doubleheader at Shea Stadium. A father of seven children at the time, Bunning pitched his perfect game on Father's Day. One of Bunning's daughters, Barbara, was in attendance, as was his wife, Mary.

Needing only 90 pitches to complete his masterpiece, Bunning struck out 10 batters, including six of the last nine he faced.

The perfect game was the first regular season perfect game since Charlie Robertson's perfect game in 1922 (Don Larsen had pitched a perfect game in between, in the 1956 World Series), as well as the first in modern-day National League history (two perfect games had been pitched in 1880). It was also the first no-hitter by a Phillies pitcher since Johnny Lush no-hit the Brooklyn Superbas on May 1, 1906.

Bunning, who no-hit the Boston Red Sox while with the Detroit Tigers in 1958, joined Cy Young as the only pitchers to throw no-hitters in both the National and American Leagues; he has since been joined by Nolan Ryan, Hideo Nomo and Randy Johnson. The perfect game also made Bunning the third pitcher, after Young and Addie Joss, to throw a perfect game and an additional no-hitter; Sandy Koufax, Johnson, Mark Buehrle and Roy Halladay have since joined him.

As the perfect game developed, Bunning defied the baseball superstition that no one should talk about a no-hitter in progress, speaking to his teammates about the perfect game to keep himself relaxed and loosen up his teammates. Bunning had abided by the tradition during a near-no hitter a few weeks before, determining afterwards that keeping quiet didn't help.

Gus Triandos, Bunning's catcher, had also caught Hoyt Wilhelm's no-hitter on September 20, 1958, while with the Baltimore Orioles, becoming the first catcher to catch no-hitters in both leagues.

== Boxscore ==
Team	1	2	3	4	5	6	7	8	9	R	H	E
Philadelphia Phillies (37–23)	1	1	0	0	0	4	0	0	0	6	8	0
New York Mets (20–46)	0	0	0	0	0	0	0	0	0	0	0	0
WP: Jim Bunning (7–2) LP: Tracy Stallard (4–9)
