= United States Senate Committee on Finance =

Standing committee of the United States Senate

Senate Finance Committee
Standing committee
- Active United States Senate; 119th Congress

History
- Formed: December 10, 1816

Leadership
- Chair: Mike Crapo (R); Since January 3, 2025
- Ranking Member: Ron Wyden (D); Since January 3, 2025

Structure
- Seats: 27 members
- Political parties: Majority (14): Republican (14); Minority (13): Democratic (12); Independent (1)

Jurisdiction
- Policy areas: Children's Health Insurance Program, Customs, Deposit of public moneys, Duties, Federal trust funds, Healthcare finance, International trade, Mandatory spending, Medicare, Medicaid, National debt, Ports of entry, Public pensions, Revenue measures for territorial possessions, Revenue sharing, Social Security, Taxation, Temporary Assistance for Needy Families, Trade agreements, Unemployment insurance
- Oversight authority: Alcohol and Tobacco Tax and Trade Bureau, Bureau of the Fiscal Service, Centers for Medicare & Medicaid Services, Department of the Treasury, Federal Employees Retirement System, Federal Retirement Thrift Investment Board, Internal Revenue Service, Joint Committee on Taxation, Office of the United States Trade Representative, Social Security Administration, Treasury Inspector General for Tax Administration, United States Customs and Border Protection
- House counterpart: House Committee on Ways and Means

Meeting place
- 215 Dirksen Senate Office Building; Washington, D.C.

Website
- www.finance.senate.gov

Rules
- Rule XXV.1.(i), Standing Rules of the Senate; Rules of the Committee on Finance

The United States Senate Committee on Finance (or, less formally, Senate Finance Committee) is a standing committee of the United States Senate. The committee concerns itself with matters relating to taxation and other revenue measures generally, and those relating to the insular possessions; bonded debt of the United States; customs, collection districts, and ports of entry and delivery; deposit of public moneys; general revenue sharing; health programs under the Social Security Act (notably Medicare and Medicaid) and health programs financed by a specific tax or trust fund; national social security; reciprocal trade agreements; tariff and import quotas, and related matters thereto; and the transportation of dutiable goods. It is considered to be one of the most powerful committees in Congress.

== History ==
The Committee on Finance is one of the original committees established in the Senate. First created on December 11, 1815, as a select committee and known as the Committee on Finance and an [sic] Uniform National Currency, it was formed to alleviate economic issues arising from the War of 1812. On December 10, 1816, the Senate officially created the Committee on Finance as a standing committee. Originally, the committee had power over tariffs, taxation, banking and currency issues and appropriations. Under this authority the committee played an influential role in the most heated topics of the era, including numerous tariff issues and the Bank War. The committee was also influential in the creation of the Department of Interior in 1849. Under the leadership of William Pitt Fessenden, the committee played a decisive role during the Civil War. Appropriating all funds for the war effort as well as raising enough funds to finance the war through tariffs and the nation's first income tax. Additionally, the committee produced the Legal Tender Act of 1862, the nation's first reliance on paper currency.

In 1865 the House of Representatives created an Appropriations Committee to relieve the burden from the Committee on Ways and Means. The Senate followed this example by forming the Senate Appropriations Committee in 1867.

Despite the loss of one of its signature duties, the committee continued to play a prominent role in the major issues of the nation. The committee was at the center of the debate over the silver question in the latter half of the 19th Century. Passage of the Bland–Allison Act and the Sherman Silver Purchase Act were attempts to remedy the demand for silver, though the silver cause would eventually fail by the end of the century. The committee also continued to play a role in the debate over income taxes. The repeal of the Civil War income taxes in the 1870s would eventually be raised in 1894 with the passage of a new income tax law. The Supreme Court's decision in Pollock v. Farmers' Loan & Trust Co., 157 U.S. 429 (1895) ruled the income tax as unconstitutional, since it was not based on apportionment. The fight for an income tax finally culminated with the Payne–Aldrich Tariff Act of 1909. In order to pass the new tariff Senate leaders, including Chair Nelson Aldrich, allowed for a Constitutional Amendment to be passed. Four years later the 16th Amendment was officially ratified and in 1913 the nation's first peacetime income tax was instituted.

Around that same time the committee lost jurisdiction over banking and currency issues to the newly created Committee on Banking and Currency. The committee did gain jurisdiction over veterans’ benefits when it successfully passed the War Risk Insurance Act of 1917. The act shifted pensions from gratuities to benefits and served as one of the first life insurance programs created under the federal government.

The Finance Committee continued to play an increasingly important role in the lives of the nation's veterans. The committee helped consolidate the veteran bureaucracy by streamlining the various responsibilities into a Veterans' Bureau, which would ultimately become the Veterans' Administration. In 1924, the committee passed a "Bonus Bill" that compensated World War I veterans for their service. This series of improved veteran benefits reached a crescendo in 1944 with the passage of the Servicemen's Readjustment Act. Senator Bennett "Champ" Clark, who served as the chair of the Subcommittee on Veterans, assured smooth sailing of the bill through the Senate. The bill not only ended the usual demands from returning veterans that had been seen in nearly every war the US had participated in, but also provided more generous benefits than veterans had previously received, including funds for continuing education, loans and unemployment insurance.

Not all Finance Committee legislation was as well received as the G.I. Bill. At the beginning of the Great Depression the committee passed the Smoot–Hawley Tariff Act. The act greatly increased tariffs and had a negative effect on the nation's economy. Following traditional economic practices the members of the committee, including Chair Reed Smoot, felt that protection of American businesses was required in order to buoy them during the dire economic times. The effort backfired and the economic situation worsened. The Smoot-Hawley Tariff would eventually be replaced by the Reciprocal Tariff Act of 1934 which authorized the president to negotiate trade agreements. This act not only set up the trade policy system as it exists today but also effectively transferred trade making policy from the Congress to the president.

The committee also played an important role in two major acts created under the New Deal. The committee received jurisdiction over the National Industrial Recovery Act because of tax code changes in the bill. The new bureaucracy was President Franklin D. Roosevelt's attempt to stimulate the economy and promote jobs for unemployed Americans while also regulating businesses. The National Recovery Administration would ultimately fail as it lost public support, but the act served as a springboard for the Wagner Act and the National Labor Board.

Probably the largest and most lasting pieces of legislation shaped by the Finance Committee during the New Deal was the 1935 Social Security Act. Once again, the committee received jurisdiction owing to the payroll taxes that would be enacted to pay for the new program. The act was the first effort by the federal government to provide benefits to the elderly and the unemployed, leading to enhanced economic welfare for many elderly Americans.

In 1981, a Senate Resolution required the printing of the history of the Committee on Finance.

== Role ==
The role of the Senate Committee on Finance is very similar to that of the House Committee on Ways and Means. The one exception in terms of authority is that the Finance Committee has jurisdiction over both Medicare and Medicaid, while the House Ways and Means Committee only has jurisdiction over Medicare. (The House Energy and Commerce Committee has jurisdiction over Medicaid.) The other difference in terms of power is that all revenue raising measures must originate in the House, giving the Ways and Means Committee a slight edge in setting tax policy.

In addition to having jurisdiction over legislation, the Committee on Finance has extensive oversight powers. It has authority to investigate, review and evaluate existing laws, and the agencies that implement them.

== Jurisdiction ==
In accordance of Rule XXV of the United States Senate, all proposed legislation, messages, petitions, memorials, and other matters relating to the following subjects are referred to the Senate Committee on Finance:

1. Bonded debt of the United States, except as provided in the Congressional Budget Act of 1974;
2. Customs, collection districts, and ports of entry and delivery;
3. Deposit of public moneys;
4. General revenue sharing;
5. Health programs under the Social Security Act and health programs financed by a specific tax or trust fund;
6. National social security;
7. Reciprocal trade agreements;
8. Revenue measures generally, except as provided in the Congressional Budget Act of 1974;
9. Revenue measures relating to the insular possessions;
10. Tariffs and import quotas, and matters related thereto; and,
11. Transportation of dutiable goods.

Given its broad remit with regards to taxation, mandatory spending, international trade, Social Security, Temporary Assistance to Needy Families, interest on the national debt, and healthcare finance—including Medicare, Medicaid, and the Children's Health Insurance Program—the Senate Committee on Finance is often considered one of the most influential standing committees in either house of Congress. A wide array of senators with differing policy interests seek membership on the committee due to its broad role in setting fiscal, tax, trade, health, and social policy.

== Members, 119th Congress ==
Majority	Minority
Mike Crapo, Idaho, Chair; Chuck Grassley, Iowa; John Cornyn, Texas; John Thune, South Dakota; Tim Scott, South Carolina; Bill Cassidy, Louisiana; James Lankford, Oklahoma; Steve Daines, Montana; Todd Young, Indiana; John Barrasso, Wyoming; Ron Johnson, Wisconsin; Thom Tillis, North Carolina; Marsha Blackburn, Tennessee; Roger Marshall, Kansas	Ron Wyden, Oregon, Ranking Member; Maria Cantwell, Washington; Michael Bennet, Colorado; Mark Warner, Virginia; Sheldon Whitehouse, Rhode Island; Maggie Hassan, New Hampshire; Catherine Cortez Masto, Nevada; Elizabeth Warren, Massachusetts; Bernie Sanders, Vermont; Tina Smith, Minnesota; Ben Ray Lujan, New Mexico; Raphael Warnock, Georgia; Peter Welch, Vermont

== Subcommittees ==
Subcommittee	Chair	Ranking Member
Energy, Natural Resources, and Infrastructure	James Lankford (R-OK)	Maria Cantwell (D-WA)
International Trade, Customs, and Global Competitiveness	John Cornyn (R-TX)	Raphael Warnock (D-GA)
Health Care	Todd Young (R-IN)	Maggie Hassan (D-NH)
Social Security, Pensions, and Family Policy	Chuck Grassley (R-IA)	Bernie Sanders (I-VT)
Taxation and IRS Oversight	John Barrasso (R-WY)	Michael Bennet (D-CO)
Fiscal Responsibility and Economic Growth	Ron Johnson (R-WI)	Tina Smith (D-MN)

== Committee leadership ==
Former chairs and ranking members are below.

=== Chairs ===
Name	Party	State	Start	End
George Campbell	Democratic-Republican	Tennessee	1815	1818
John Eppes	Democratic-Republican	Virginia	1818	1819
Nathan Sanford	Democratic-Republican	New York	1819	1821
John Holmes	Democratic-Republican	Maine	1821	1822
Walter Lowrie	Democratic-Republican	Pennsylvania	1822	1823
Samuel Smith	Democratic-Republican (1823–1824)	Maryland	1823	1832
Samuel Smith	Crawford Democratic-Republican (1824–1825)	Maryland	1823	1832
Samuel Smith	Jacksonian (1825–1832)	Maryland	1823	1832
John Forsyth	Jacksonian	Georgia	1832	1833
Daniel Webster	Anti-Jacksonian	Massachusetts	1833	1836
Silas Wright	Jacksonian (1836–1837)	New York	1836	1841
Silas Wright	Democratic (1837–1841)	New York	1836	1841
Henry Clay	Whig	Kentucky	1841	
George Evans	Whig	Maine	1841	1845
Levi Woodbury	Democratic	New Hampshire	1845	
John Calhoun	Democratic	South Carolina	1845	1846
Dixon Lewis	Democratic	Alabama	1846	1847
Charles Atherton	Democratic	New Hampshire	1847	1849
Daniel Dickinson	Democratic	New York	1849	1850
Robert Hunter	Democratic	Virginia	1850	1861
James Pearce	Democratic	Maryland	1861	
William Fessenden	Republican	Maine	1861	1864
John Sherman	Republican	Ohio	1864	1865
William Fessenden	Republican	Maine	1865	1867
John Sherman	Republican	Ohio	1867	1877
Justin Morrill	Republican	Vermont	1877	1879
Thomas Bayard	Democratic	Delaware	1879	1881
Justin Morrill	Republican	Vermont	1881	1893
Daniel Voorhees	Democratic	Indiana	1893	1895
Justin Morrill	Republican	Vermont	1895	1898
Nelson Aldrich	Republican	Rhode Island	1898	1911
Boies Penrose	Republican	Pennsylvania	1911	1913
Furnifold Simmons	Democratic	North Carolina	1913	1919
Boies Penrose	Republican	Pennsylvania	1919	1921
Porter McCumber	Republican	North Dakota	1921	1923
Reed Smoot	Republican	Utah	1923	1933
Pat Harrison	Democratic	Mississippi	1933	1941
Walter George	Democratic	Georgia	1941	1947
Eugene Millikin	Republican	Colorado	1947	1949
Walter George	Democratic	Georgia	1949	1953
Eugene Millikin	Republican	Colorado	1953	1955
Harry Byrd	Democratic	Virginia	1955	1965
Russell Long	Democratic	Louisiana	1965	1981
Bob Dole	Republican	Kansas	1981	1985
Bob Packwood	Republican	Oregon	1985	1987
Lloyd Bentsen	Democratic	Texas	1987	1993
Pat Moynihan	Democratic	New York	1993	1995
Bob Packwood	Republican	Oregon	1995	
Bill Roth	Republican	Delaware	1995	2001
Max Baucus	Democratic	Montana	2001	
Chuck Grassley	Republican	Iowa	2001	
Max Baucus	Democratic	Montana	2001	2003
Chuck Grassley	Republican	Iowa	2003	2007
Max Baucus	Democratic	Montana	2007	2014
Ron Wyden	Democratic	Oregon	2014	2015
Orrin Hatch	Republican	Utah	2015	2019
Chuck Grassley	Republican	Iowa	2019	2021
Ron Wyden	Democratic	Oregon	2021	2025
Mike Crapo	Republican	Idaho	2025	present

=== Ranking Members ===
Name	Party	State	Start	End
Walter George	Democratic	Georgia	1947	1949
Eugene Millikin	Republican	Colorado	1949	1953
Walter George	Democratic	Georgia	1953	1955
Eugene Millikin	Republican	Colorado	1955	1957
Edward Martin	Republican	Pennsylvania	1957	1959
John Williams	Republican	Delaware	1959	1970
Wallace Bennett	Republican	Utah	1970	1974
Carl Curtis	Republican	Nebraska	1975	1979
Bob Dole	Republican	Kansas	1979	1981
Russell Long	Democratic	Louisiana	1981	1987
Bob Packwood	Republican	Oregon	1987	1995
Pat Moynihan	Democratic	New York	1995	2001
Chuck Grassley	Republican	Iowa	2001	
Max Baucus	Democratic	Montana	2001	
Chuck Grassley	Republican	Iowa	2001	2003
Max Baucus	Democratic	Montana	2003	2007
Chuck Grassley	Republican	Iowa	2007	2011
Orrin Hatch	Republican	Utah	2011	2015
Ron Wyden	Democratic	Oregon	2015	2021
Mike Crapo	Republican	Idaho	2021	2025
Ron Wyden	Democratic	Oregon	2025	present

== Historical committee rosters ==
=== 118th Congress ===
Majority	Minority
Ron Wyden, Oregon, Chair; Debbie Stabenow, Michigan; Maria Cantwell, Washington; Bob Menendez, New Jersey (until August 20, 2024); Tom Carper, Delaware; Ben Cardin, Maryland; Sherrod Brown, Ohio; Michael Bennet, Colorado; Bob Casey, Pennsylvania; Mark Warner, Virginia; Sheldon Whitehouse, Rhode Island; Maggie Hassan, New Hampshire; Catherine Cortez Masto, Nevada; Elizabeth Warren, Massachusetts; George Helmy, New Jersey (September 10, 2024–December 8, 2024); Andy Kim, New Jersey (from December 10, 2024)	Mike Crapo, Idaho, Ranking Member; Chuck Grassley, Iowa; John Cornyn, Texas; John Thune, South Dakota; Tim Scott, South Carolina; Bill Cassidy, Louisiana; James Lankford, Oklahoma; Steve Daines, Montana; Todd Young, Indiana; John Barrasso, Wyoming; Ron Johnson, Wisconsin; Thom Tillis, North Carolina; Marsha Blackburn, Tennessee

Subcommittees

Subcommittee	Chair	Ranking Member
Energy, Natural Resources, and Infrastructure	Debbie Stabenow (D-MI)	James Lankford (R-OK)
International Trade, Customs, and Global Competitiveness	Tom Carper (D-DE)	John Cornyn (R-TX)
Health Care	Ben Cardin (D-MD)	Steve Daines (R-MT)
Social Security, Pensions, and Family Policy	Sherrod Brown (D-OH)	Thom Tillis (R-NC)
Taxation and IRS Oversight	Michael Bennet (D-CO)	John Thune (R-SD)
Fiscal Responsibility and Economic Growth	Maggie Hassan (D-NH)	Chuck Grassley (R-IA)

=== 117th Congress ===
Majority	Minority
Ron Wyden, Oregon, Chair; Debbie Stabenow, Michigan; Maria Cantwell, Washington; Bob Menendez, New Jersey; Tom Carper, Delaware; Ben Cardin, Maryland; Sherrod Brown, Ohio; Michael Bennet, Colorado; Bob Casey, Pennsylvania; Mark Warner, Virginia; Sheldon Whitehouse, Rhode Island; Maggie Hassan, New Hampshire; Catherine Cortez Masto, Nevada; Elizabeth Warren, Massachusetts	Mike Crapo, Idaho, Ranking Member; Chuck Grassley, Iowa; John Cornyn, Texas; John Thune, South Dakota; Richard Burr, North Carolina; Rob Portman, Ohio; Pat Toomey, Pennsylvania; Tim Scott, South Carolina; Bill Cassidy, Louisiana; James Lankford, Oklahoma; Steve Daines, Montana; Todd Young, Indiana; Ben Sasse, Nebraska; John Barrasso, Wyoming

Subcommittees

Subcommittee	Chair	Ranking Member
Energy, Natural Resources, and Infrastructure	Debbie Stabenow (D-MI)	James Lankford (R-OK)
International Trade, Customs, and Global Competitiveness	Tom Carper (D-DE)	John Cornyn (R-TX)
Health Care	Ben Cardin (D-MD)	Steve Daines (R-MT)
Social Security, Pensions, and Family Policy	Sherrod Brown (D-OH)	Thom Tillis (R-NC)
Taxation and IRS Oversight	Michael Bennet (D-CO)	John Thune (R-SD)
Fiscal Responsibility and Economic Growth	Maggie Hassan (D-NH)	Chuck Grassley (R-IA)

=== 116th Congress ===
Majority	Minority
Chuck Grassley, Iowa, Chair; Mike Crapo, Idaho; John Cornyn, Texas; John Thune, South Dakota; Richard Burr, North Carolina; Rob Portman, Ohio; Pat Toomey, Pennsylvania; Tim Scott, South Carolina; Bill Cassidy, Louisiana; James Lankford, Oklahoma; Steve Daines, Montana; Todd Young, Indiana; Ben Sasse, Nebraska	Ron Wyden, Oregon, Ranking Member; Debbie Stabenow, Michigan; Maria Cantwell, Washington; Bob Menendez, New Jersey; Tom Carper, Delaware; Ben Cardin, Maryland; Sherrod Brown, Ohio; Michael Bennet, Colorado; Bob Casey, Pennsylvania; Mark Warner, Virginia; Sheldon Whitehouse, Rhode Island; Maggie Hassan, New Hampshire; Catherine Cortez Masto, Nevada

Subcommittees

Subcommittee	Chair	Ranking Member
Energy, Natural Resources, and Infrastructure	Tim Scott (R-SC)	Michael Bennet (D-CO)
Fiscal Responsibility and Economic Growth	Bill Cassidy (R-LA)	Maggie Hassan (D-NH)
Health Care	Pat Toomey (R-PA)	Debbie Stabenow (D-MI)
International Trade, Customs, and Global Competitiveness	John Cornyn (R-TX)	Bob Casey Jr. (D-PA)
Taxation and IRS Oversight	John Thune (R-SD)	Mark Warner (D-VA)
Social Security, Pensions, and Family Policy	Rob Portman (R-OH)	Sherrod Brown (D-OH)

=== 115th Congress ===
Majority	Minority
Orrin Hatch, Utah, Chair; Chuck Grassley, Iowa; Mike Crapo, Idaho; Pat Roberts, Kansas; Mike Enzi, Wyoming; John Cornyn, Texas; John Thune, South Dakota; Richard Burr, North Carolina; Johnny Isakson, Georgia; Rob Portman, Ohio; Pat Toomey, Pennsylvania; Dean Heller, Nevada; Tim Scott, South Carolina; Bill Cassidy, Louisiana	Ron Wyden, Oregon, Ranking Member; Debbie Stabenow, Michigan; Maria Cantwell, Washington; Bill Nelson, Florida; Bob Menendez, New Jersey; Tom Carper, Delaware; Ben Cardin, Maryland; Sherrod Brown, Ohio; Michael Bennet, Colorado; Bob Casey, Pennsylvania; Mark Warner, Virginia; Claire McCaskill, Missouri
