= United States Senate Finance Subcommittee on Energy, Natural Resources, and Infrastructure =

US House committee

The Senate Finance Subcommittee on Energy, Natural Resources, and Infrastructure is one of the six subcommittees within the Senate Committee on Finance

== Members, 119th Congress ==
Majority	Minority
James Lankford, Oklahoma, Chair; John Cornyn, Texas; Tim Scott, South Carolina; Steve Daines, Montana; John Barrasso, Wyoming; Roger Marshall, Kansas	Maria Cantwell, Washington, Ranking Member; Michael Bennet, Colorado; Maggie Hassan, New Hampshire; Ben Ray Luján, New Mexico; Peter Welch, Vermont
Ex officio
Mike Crapo, Idaho	Ron Wyden, Oregon

== Historical membership rosters ==
=== 118th Congress ===
Majority	Minority
Debbie Stabenow, Michigan, Chair; Tom Carper, Delaware; Sheldon Whitehouse, Rhode Island; Catherine Cortez Masto, Nevada; Michael Bennet, Colorado	James Lankford, Oklahoma, Ranking Member; John Cornyn, Texas; Tim Scott, South Carolina; John Barrasso, Wyoming; Steve Daines, Montana
Ex officio
Ron Wyden, Oregon	Mike Crapo, Idaho
