= United States Senate Finance Subcommittee on International Trade, Customs, and Global Competitiveness =

The Senate Finance Subcommittee on International Trade, Customs, and Global Competitiveness is one of the six subcommittees within the Senate Committee on Finance.

== Members, 119th Congress ==
Majority	Minority
John Cornyn, Texas, Chair; Chuck Grassley, Iowa; John Thune, South Dakota; Tim Scott, South Carolina; Steve Daines, Montana; Todd Young, Indiana; Thom Tillis, North Carolina; Roger Marshall, Kansas	Raphael Warnock, Georgia, Ranking Member; Michael Bennet, Colorado; Mark Warner, Virginia; Sheldon Whitehouse, Rhode Island; Catherine Cortez Masto, Nevada; Elizabeth Warren, Massachusetts; Tina Smith, Minnesota
Ex officio
Mike Crapo, Idaho	Ron Wyden, Oregon

== Historical membership rosters ==
=== 118th Congress ===
Majority	Minority
Tom Carper, Delaware, Chair; Debbie Stabenow, Michigan; Bob Menendez, New Jersey (until August 20, 2024); Ben Cardin, Maryland; Michael Bennet, Colorado; Sherrod Brown, Ohio; Bob Casey Jr., Pennsylvania; Mark Warner, Virginia; Catherine Cortez Masto, Nevada	John Cornyn, Texas, Ranking Member; John Thune, South Dakota; Tim Scott, South Carolina; Bill Cassidy, Louisiana; Steve Daines, Montana; Todd Young, Indiana; John Barrasso, Wyoming; Ron Johnson, Wisconsin; Thom Tillis, North Carolina
Ex officio
Ron Wyden, Oregon	Mike Crapo, Idaho
