= United States Senate Finance Subcommittee on Health Care =

The Senate Finance Subcommittee on Health Care is one of the six subcommittees within the Senate Committee on Finance.

== Members, 119th Congress ==
Majority	Minority
Todd Young, Indiana, Chair; John Thune, South Dakota; Tim Scott, South Carolina; Bill Cassidy, Louisiana; James Lankford, Oklahoma; John Barrasso, Wyoming; Ron Johnson, Wisconsin; Thom Tillis, North Carolina; Marsha Blackburn, Tennessee; Roger Marshall, Kansas	Maggie Hassan, New Hampshire, Ranking Member; Mark Warner, Virginia; Sheldon Whitehouse, Rhode Island; Catherine Cortez Masto, Nevada; Elizabeth Warren, Massachusetts; Bernie Sanders, Vermont; Tina Smith, Minnesota; Raphael Warnock, Georgia; Peter Welch, Vermont
Ex officio
Mike Crapo, Idaho	Ron Wyden, Oregon

== Historical membership rosters ==
=== 118th Congress ===
Majority	Minority
Ben Cardin, Maryland, Chair; Ron Wyden, Oregon; Debbie Stabenow, Michigan; Bob Menendez, New Jersey (until August 20, 2024); Tom Carper, Delaware; Bob Casey Jr., Pennsylvania; Mark Warner, Virginia; Sheldon Whitehouse, Rhode Island; Maggie Hassan, New Hampshire; Catherine Cortez Masto, Nevada; Elizabeth Warren, Massachusetts	Steve Daines, Montana, Ranking Member; Chuck Grassley, Iowa; John Thune, South Dakota; Tim Scott, South Carolina; Bill Cassidy, Louisiana; James Lankford, Oklahoma; Todd Young, Indiana; John Barrasso, Wyoming; Ron Johnson, Wisconsin; Marsha Blackburn, Tennessee
Ex officio
	Mike Crapo, Idaho
