= 2022 Shreveport mayoral election =

- November 8, 2022 (first round); December 10, 2022 (runoff)
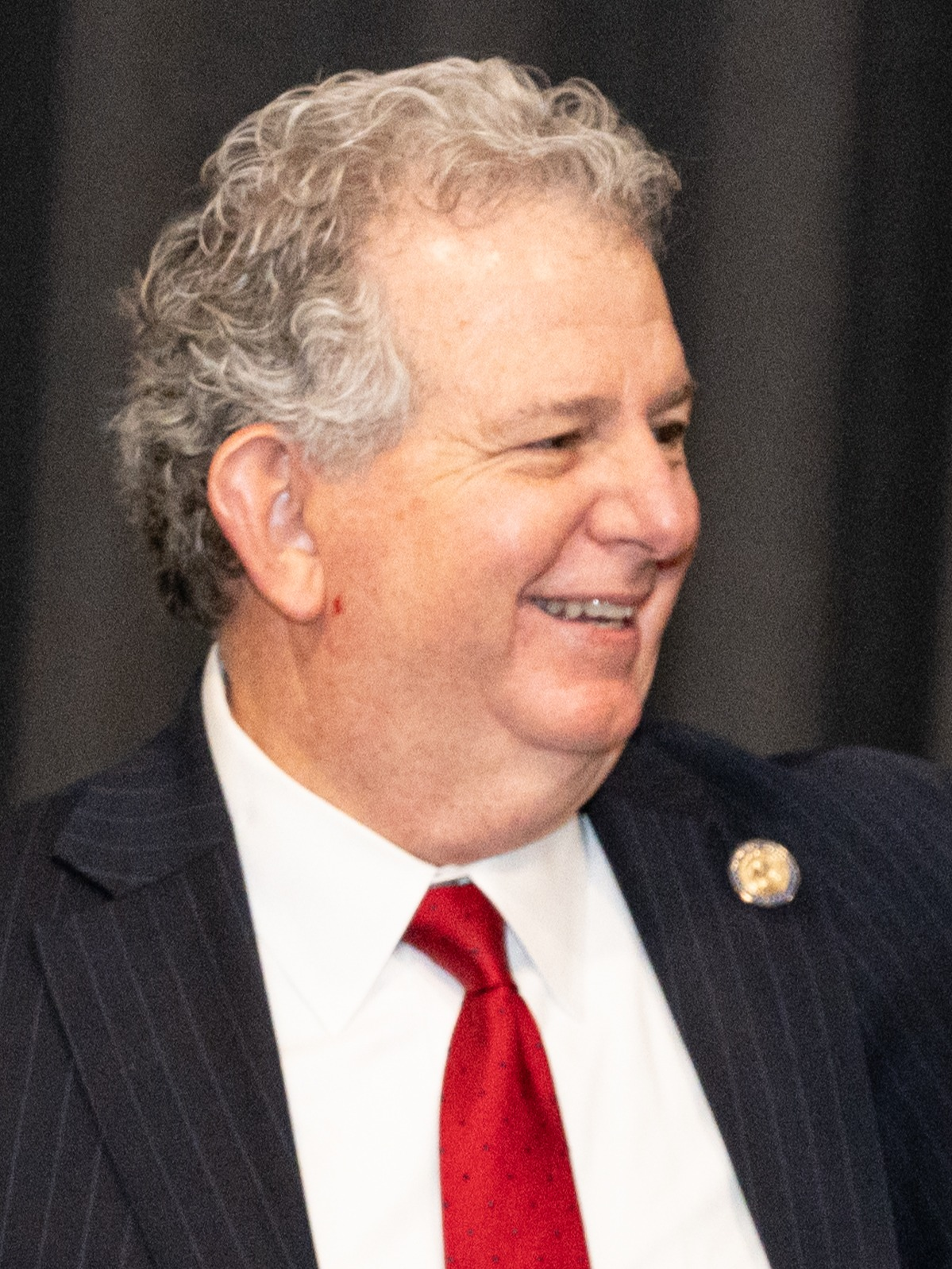

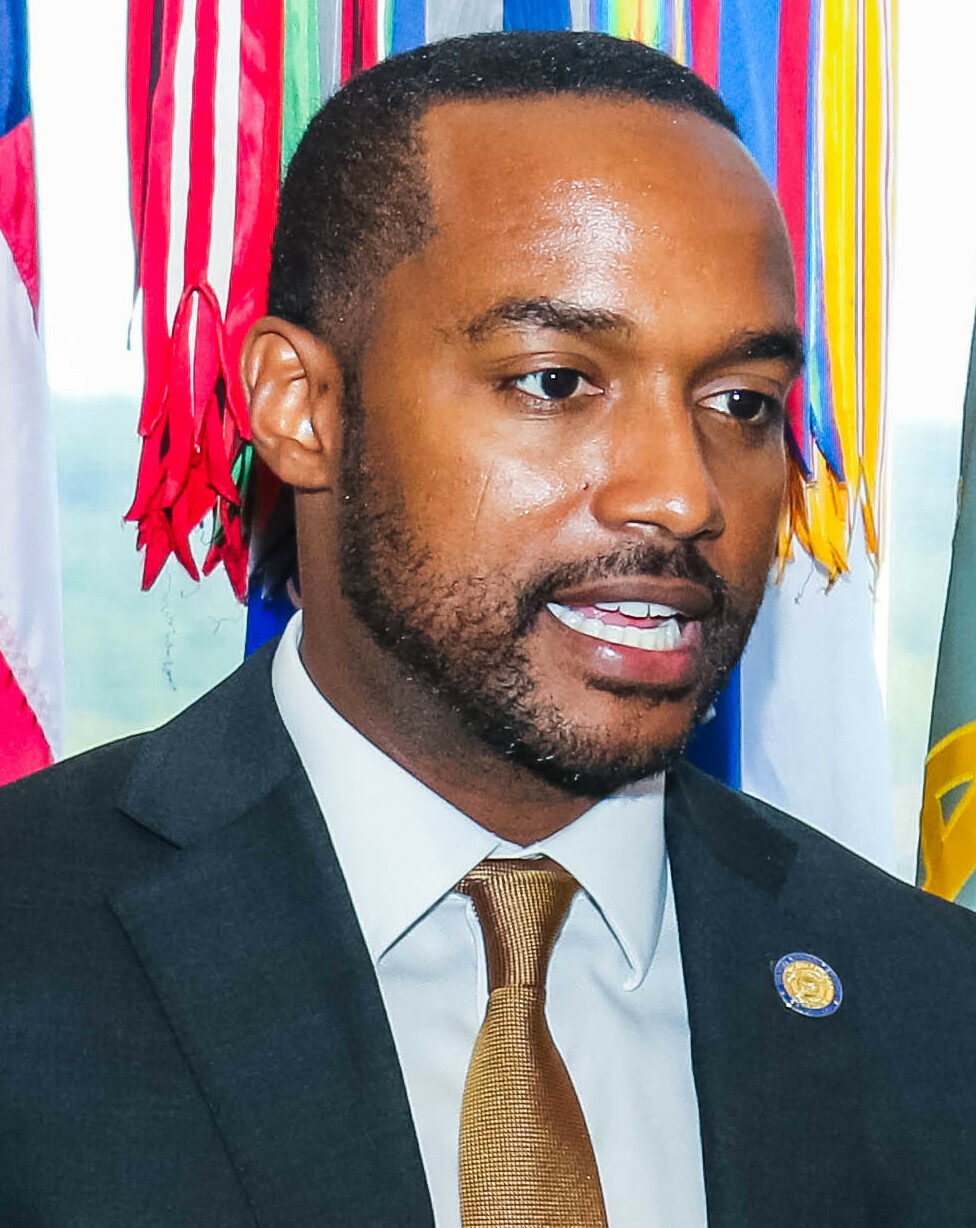

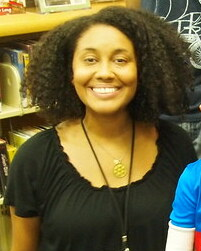
Candidate	Tom Arceneaux	Gregory Tarver	Mario Chavez
Party	Republican	Democratic	Independent
First round	14,709; 28.46%	12,202; 23.61%	9,458; 18.30%
Runoff	20,724; 56.37%	16,040; 43.63%	Eliminated
Candidate	Adrian Perkins	LeVette Fuller
Party	Democratic	Democratic
First round	9,090; 17.59%	5,029; 9.73%
Runoff	Eliminated	Eliminated
- Second round precinct results Arceneaux: 50–60% 60–70% 70–80% 80–90% >90% Tarver: 50–60% 60–70% 70–80% 80–90% >90%
Mayor before election
Adrian Perkins
Democratic
Elected mayor
Tom Arceneaux
Republican

The 2022 Shreveport mayoral election took place on November 8, 2022, with a runoff election on December 10 because no candidate obtained a majority of the vote in the first round. It selected the next mayor of Shreveport, Louisiana. Incumbent Democratic mayor Adrian Perkins sought re-election to a second term in office, but finished fourth in the general election. Former Shreveport City Councillor Tom Arceneaux, a Republican, and Louisiana state senator Gregory Tarver, a Democrat, advanced to the runoff election. Besides Perkins, other candidates eliminated in the general election include Caddo Parish Commission president Mario Chavez and city councillor LeVette Fuller.

In the runoff, Perkins and the two previous mayors of Shreveport, all black Democrats, endorsed Arceneaux, a white Republican, over Tarver, a black Democrat. They emphasized that their endorsement was based on personality rather than politics and that they believed Arceneaux to be best for the job. However, they also criticized Tarver for voting against the Justice Reinvestment Act, a 2017 sentencing reform bill championed by Louisiana governor John Bel Edwards. Tarver was endorsed by other prominent Democrats, including Edwards and former mayor Keith Hightower, as well as Republicans including Louisiana Senate president Page Cortez.

The runoff was hotly contested, with both men facing attack ads over accusations of domestic violence against them in the past. Tarver was also criticized because he lived outside of Shreveport until 2021 and his wife received $600,000 in contracts from riverboat casinos that he helped bring to the city. Tarver and Arceneaux denied wrongdoing in all cases and called for the outside groups running the negative ads to pull them from the air. A crucial issue in the race was crime. Tarver was described as running a "tough on crime" campaign and said he would gather law enforcement agencies to develop a plan for reducing violent crime, while Arceneaux believed the best strategy to reduce crime was to improve neighborhoods affected by blight, and proposed imposing liens on blighted property to encourage the owners to improve or sell them.

Arceneaux won the runoff election with 56% of the vote to 44% for Tarver. This was the first Shreveport mayoral race won by a Republican since 1994.

== Candidates ==
=== Democratic Party ===
Perkins was initially disqualified from the race by the First District Court of Louisiana for listing the incorrect address on his notice of candidacy. However, the Louisiana Supreme Court overturned that ruling and allowed Perkins's candidacy to continue in a 4-3 decision, ruling that answering certain questions incorrectly on a notice of candidacy is not grounds for immediate disqualification.

==== Declared ====
- LeVette Fuller, Shreveport City Councillor
- Tracy Mendels, former police officer and U.S. Army sergeant
- Adrian Perkins, incumbent mayor
- Gregory Tarver, Louisiana state senator
- Darryl Ware, former volunteer for the Elizabeth Warren 2020 presidential campaign

=== Republican Party ===
==== Declared ====
- Tom Arceneaux, attorney and former Shreveport City Councillor
- Melvin Slack, evangelist

==== Withdrew ====
- Jim Taliaferro, at-large Caddo Parish commissioner and candidate for mayor in 2018 (running for city council)

=== Independents ===
==== Declared ====
- Mario Chavez, president of the Caddo Parish commission
- Julius Romano

=== Libertarian Party ===
==== Declared ====
- Lauren Ray Anderson, attorney

== General election ==
=== Results ===
2022 Shreveport mayoral general election
Party	Candidate	Votes	%
Republican	Tom Arceneaux	14,709	28.46%
Democratic	Gregory Tarver	12,202	23.61%
Independent	Mario Chavez	9,458	18.30%
Democratic	Adrian Perkins (incumbent)	9,090	17.59%
Democratic	LeVette Fuller	5,029	9.73%
Democratic	Tracy Mendels	379	0.73%
Democratic	Darryl Ware	298	0.58%
Libertarian	Lauren Ray Anderson	233	0.45%
Republican	Melvin Slack	147	0.28%
Independent	Julius Romano	132	0.26%
Total votes		51,677	100%

== Runoff ==
=== Endorsements ===
Tom Arceneaux (R)

Municipal officials

- William Bradford, former Shreveport City Attorney
- Cedric Glover, Louisiana state representative and former mayor (Democratic)
- Adrian Perkins, incumbent mayor (Democratic)
- Jim Roberts, former Shreveport Chief of Police
- Ollie Tyler, former mayor (Democratic)
Gregory Tarver (D)

Statewide officials

- John Bel Edwards, Governor of Louisiana

State legislators

- Page Cortez, president of the Louisiana Senate (Republican)
- Barrow Peacock, state senator (Republican)

Municipal officials

- Keith Hightower, former mayor
Declined to endorse

Municipal officials

- LeVette Fuller, Shreveport City Councillor and 5th-place finisher in the primary election (Democratic)

=== Results ===
2022 Shreveport mayoral runoff
Party	Candidate	Votes	%
Republican	Tom Arceneaux	20,724	56.37%
Democratic	Gregory Tarver	16,040	43.63%
Total votes		36,764	100
Republican gain from Democratic			
