= Louisiana's 2nd House of Representatives district =

American legislative district

Louisiana's 2nd State House of Representatives district
Representative
Steven Jackson; D–Shreveport

Louisiana's 2nd House district is one of 105 Louisiana House of Representatives districts. It is currently represented by Democrat Steven Jackson of Shreveport.

== Geography ==
HD2 comprises a large part of the city of Shreveport.

== Election results ==
Year	Opponent	Party	Percent	Candidate	Party	Percent
2011 (Note: Incumbent ran unopposed)	Roy A. Burrell	Democratic	100%			
2015	Samuel Jenkins Jr.	Democratic	60.6%	Terence Vinson	Democratic	39.4%
2019 (Note: Incumbent ran unopposed)	Samuel Jenkins Jr.	Democratic	100%			
2023	Steven Jackson	Democratic	51.5%	Terence Vinson	Democratic	49.5%
