= 1994 Shreveport mayoral election =

- October 1, 1994 (first round); November 8, 1994 (runoff)

Candidate	Bo Williams	Roy Cary
Party	Republican	Democratic
First round	16,412; 30.05%	15,291; 28%
Runoff	38,678; 58.86%	27,030; 41.14%
Candidate	John Brennan Hussey	Henry Lee Burns
Party	Democratic	Republican
First round	11,855; 21.71%	8,888; 16.28%
Runoff	Eliminated	Eliminated
Mayor before election
Hazel Beard
Republican
Elected mayor
Robert W. "Bo" Williams
Republican

The 1994 Shreveport mayoral election resulted in the election of Republican councilman Robert W. "Bo" Williams in the race to succeed incumbent Hazel Beard. The primary election was held on October 1, 1994. Williams and fellow councilman Roy Cary advanced to the general election held on November 8, 1994.

Notably, incumbent mayor Beard decided not to run for re-election though she has served only one term and was eligible to contest another race. Former mayor John Brennan Hussey ran in the primary, but came third and therefore did not advance to the general election. This was the last time in which a Republican was elected mayor of Shreveport until 2022.

== Results ==
1994 Mayor of Shreveport primary election
Party	Candidate	Votes	%
Republican	Robert W. "Bo" Williams	16,412	30.05%
Democratic	Roy Cary	15,291	28%
Democratic	John Brennan Hussey	11,855	21.71%
Republican	Henry Burns	8,888	16.28%
Democratic	Ken Epperson	1,002	1.83%
Independent	Hank Hubley	653	1.2%
Republican	Gary Wilkins	178	0.33%
Democratic	Bob Pitts	165	0.3%
Democratic	Earl Williams Davis II	163	0.3%
Total votes		54,607	100%

1994 Mayor of Shreveport general election
Party	Candidate	Votes	%
Republican	Bo Williams|Robert W. "Bo" Williams	38,678	58.86%
Democratic	Roy Cary	27,030	41.14%
Total votes		65,708	100%
