= 1990 Shreveport mayoral election =

- October 6, 1990 (first round); November 6, 1990 (runoff)
Candidate	Hazel Beard	C. O. Simpkins	Bill Bush
Party	Republican	Democratic	Democratic
First round	15,234; 22.89%	21,242; 31.92%	7,566; 11.37%
Runoff	38,683; 59.48%	26,367; 40.54%	Eliminated
Candidate	Ron Bean	Carolyn Whitehurst	Gary Childress
Party	Republican	Republican	Republican
First round	5,064; 7.61%	5,005; 7.52%	3,969; 5.96%
Runoff	Eliminated	Eliminated	Eliminated
Candidate	Doug Remmer
Party	Republican
First round	3,824; 5.75%
Runoff	Eliminated
Mayor before election
John Brennan Hussey
Democratic
Elected mayor
Hazel Beard
Republican

The 1990 Shreveport mayoral election resulted in the election of Republican councilwoman Hazel Beard in the race to succeed the term limited incumbent, John Brennan Hussey. The primary election was held on October 6, 1990. Beard and C. O. Simpkins, a dentist and civil rights activist, advanced to the general election held on November 6, 1990. Beard became the first woman, and the first Republican since Reconstruction, to serve as mayor of Shreveport.

== Results ==
1990 Mayor of Shreveport primary election
Party	Candidate	Votes	%
Democratic	C. O. Simpkins	21,242	31.92%
Republican	Hazel Beard	15,234	22.89%
Democratic	Bill Bush	7,566	11.37%
Republican	Ron Bean	5,064	7.61%
Republican	Carolyn Whitehurst	5,005	7.52%
Republican	Gary Childress	3,969	5.96%
Republican	Doug Rimmer	3,824	5.75%
Democratic	Hersy Jones Jr.	2,524	3.79%
Democratic	Richard Flicker	1,126	1.69%
Democratic	Bubba Hardin	552	0.83%
Independent	Ronnie Glynn Johnson	229	0.34%
Republican	Tim Goeders	215	0.32%
Total votes		66,550	100.00%

1990 Mayor of Shreveport general election
Party	Candidate	Votes	%
Republican	Hazel Beard	38,683	59.47%
Democratic	C. O. Simpkins	26,367	40.53%
Total votes		65,040	100.00%
