= 2026 Shreveport mayoral election =

- November 3, 2026 (first round); December 12, 2026 (runoff)
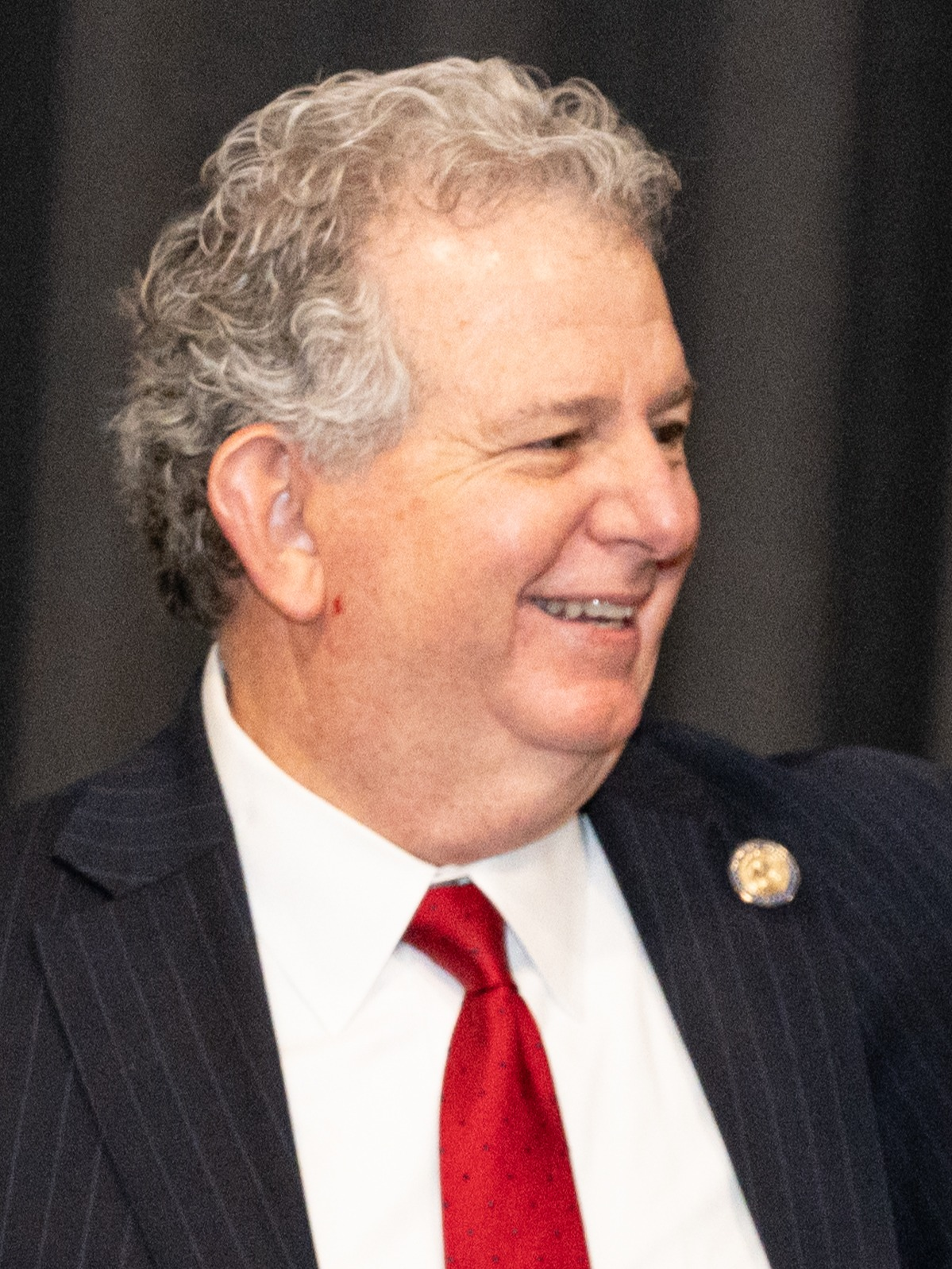

Candidate	Tom Arceneaux	Stormy Gage-Watts	John-Paul Young
Party	Republican	Democratic	Republican
First round	19,331; 35.6%	12,287; 22.6%	9,890; 18.2%
Runoff	TBD	TBD	Eliminated
Candidate	Tammy Phelps	Michael Williams
Party	Democratic	Democratic
First round	8,689; 16.0%	2,643; 4.9%
Runoff	Eliminated	Eliminated
Incumbent Mayor
Tom Arceneaux
Republican

The 2026 Shreveport mayoral election will take place on November 3, 2026. Incumbent Republican Tom Arceneaux is running for re-election as Mayor of Shreveport, and faces Democratic Caddo Parish Commission president Stormy Gage-Watts in a runoff election.

== Candidates ==
=== Republican Party ===
==== Declared ====
- Tom Arceneaux, incumbent mayor (2022–present)
- John-Paul Young, Caddo Parish commissioner

=== Democratic Party ===
==== Declared ====
- Stormy Gage-Watts, Caddo Parish Commission president
- Michael Mays
- Tammy Phelps, state representative
- Michael Williams, former Caddo Parish commissioner

=== Independents ===
==== Declared ====
- Sia Ravari, business owner
