= 2018 Shreveport mayoral election =

- November 6, 2018 (first round); December 8, 2018 (runoff)
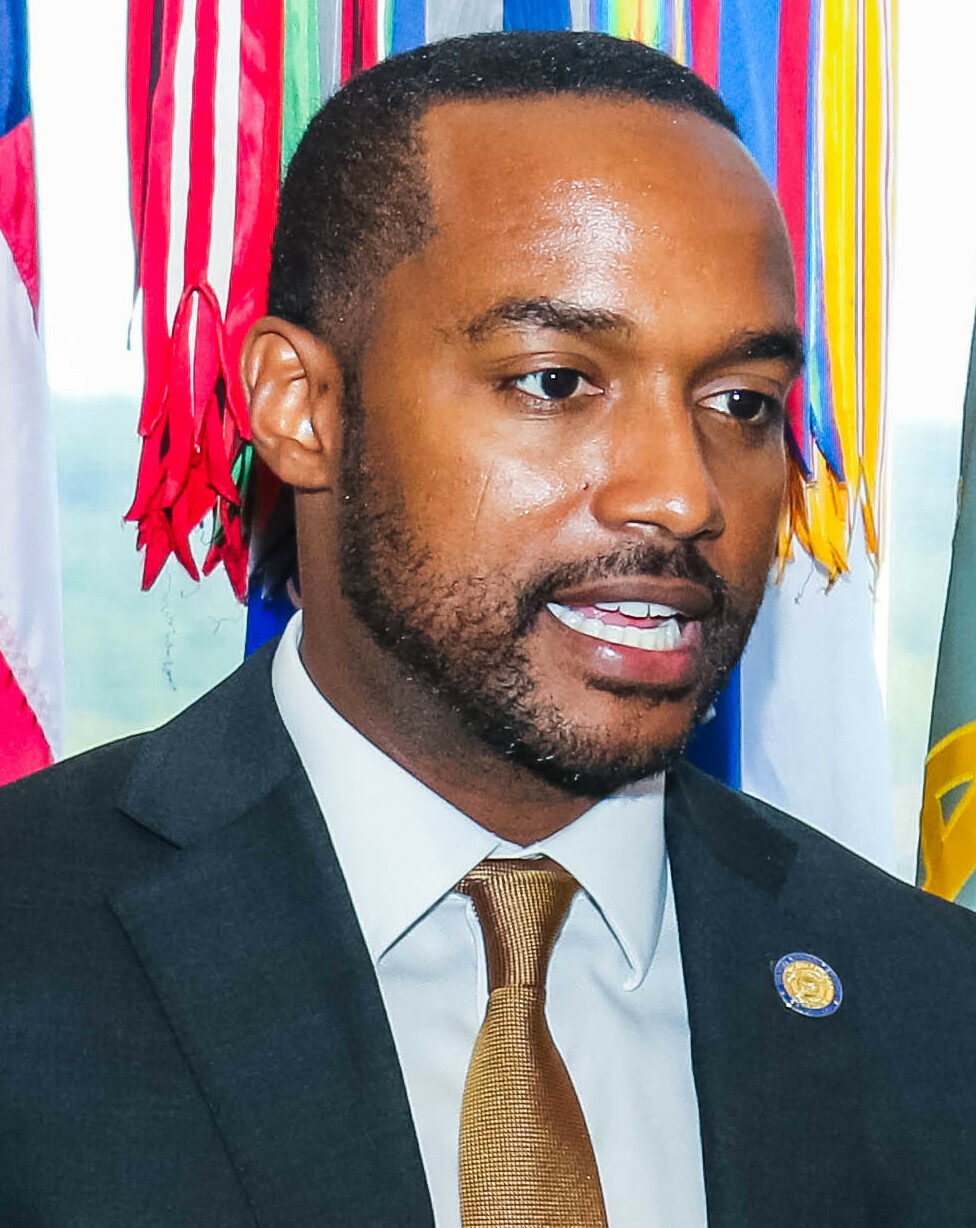

Candidate	Adrian Perkins	Ollie Tyler	Jim Taliaferro
Party	Democratic	Democratic	Republican
First round	17,528; 28.83%	14,436; 23.75%	12,478; 20.53%
Runoff	25,138; 64.4%	13,895; 35.6%	Eliminated
Candidate	Lee O. Savage	Steven Jackson
Party	Republican	Democratic
First round	8,357; 13.75%	6,808; 11.2%
Runoff	Eliminated	Eliminated
Mayor before election
Ollie Tyler
Democratic
Elected mayor
Adrian Perkins
Democratic

The 2018 Shreveport mayoral election resulted in the election of Democrat Adrian Perkins who defeated incumbent mayor of Shreveport Ollie Tyler in the runoff. The nonpartisan blanket primary was held on November 6, 2018, and as no candidate obtained the required majority, the general election followed on December 8, 2018.

== Results ==
2018 mayor of Shreveport primary election
Party	Candidate	Votes	%
Democratic	Adrian Perkins	17,528	28.83%
Democratic	Ollie Tyler (incumbent)	14,436	23.75%
Republican	Jim Taliaferro	12,478	20.53%
Republican	Lee O. Savage	8,357	13.75%
Democratic	Steven Jackson	6,808	11.2%
Democratic	Tremecius Dixon	484	0.8%
Independent	Anna Marie Arpino	360	0.59%
Democratic	Jeron Rogers	339	0.56%
Total votes		60,790	100%

2018 mayor of Shreveport general election
Party	Candidate	Votes	%
Democratic	Adrian Perkins	25,138	64.4%
Democratic	Ollie Tyler (incumbent)	13,895	35.6%
Total votes		39,033	100%
