= Senator Tarver =

Senator Tarver may refer to:

- Ed Tarver (born 1959), Georgia State Senate
- Gregory Tarver (born 1946), Louisiana State Senate
