= Lydia P. Jackson =

American politician

Lydia Patrice Jackson

Member of the Louisiana Senate from the 39th district
- In office 2004–2012
- Preceded by: Gregory Tarver
- Succeeded by: Gregory Tarver

Member of the Louisiana House of Representatives from the 2nd district
- In office 2000–2004
- Preceded by: Danny Mitchell
- Succeeded by: Roy A. Burrell

Personal details
- Born: March 5, 1960 (age 66)
- Party: Democratic
- Education: Radcliffe College
- Occupation: Bank officer

Lydia Patrice Jackson (born March 5, 1960) is a Democratic former member of the Louisiana State Senate from Shreveport, Louisiana. An African American, Jackson represented District 39 in Caddo Parish in the far northwestern corner of her state from 2004 to 2012.

== Biography ==
Lydia Patrice Jackson was born March 5, 1960. Her father, Alphonse J. Jackson of Shreveport, was an educator, a former member of the Louisiana House, and one of the ten founders of the Louisiana Legislative Black Caucus.

Jackson graduated from Radcliffe College, the female attachment to Harvard University in Cambridge, Massachusetts.

From 2000 to 2004, she was the first person of her race to hold the District 2 seat in the Louisiana House of Representatives. Prior to 1997, she was an aide in the District of Columbia to Democratic former U.S. Senator J. Bennett Johnson Jr. She is a graduate of Radcliffe College in Cambridge, Massachusetts.

In 2009, Jackson made statewide headlines by sponsoring Louisiana Senate Bill 335 to delay a tax break passed in 2008 to halt budget-cutting in public higher education during a downturn of the economy in 2009 and 2010. On June 14, 2009, the Baton Rouge Morning Advocate noted that the proposal passed the Senate but "appears to be dead in the House". Jackson was to have addressed the Press Club of Baton Rouge on the next day. See also cuts to higher education.

Outside the legislature, Jackson is a former research coordinator for Marshall Sigler, Inc. She later became a business development officer and vice president for Capital One Bank.

Jackson was unseated in her bid for a third term in the Senate in the general election held on November 19, 2011. She lost to her Democratic predecessor in the seat, former Senator Gregory Tarver, a Shreveport businessman. Tarver prevailed with 9,168 votes (52.5 percent) to Jackson's 8,295 (47.5 percent).

In the nonpartisan blanket primary held on October 22, Jackson had led a three-candidate field with 9,393 votes (43.4 percent). Tarver trailed with 9,015 (41.6 percent). A third candidate, the white conservative Republican Jim Slagle, held the remaining 3,259 votes (15 percent).

Both the Jackson and Tarver families are long-time advocates for civil rights in the Shreveport community.

== Notes ==
Louisiana State Senate
Preceded by Gregory Tarver	Louisiana State Senator for District 39 (Caddo Parish); Lydia Patrice Jackson; 2004–2012	Succeeded by Gregory Tarver
Louisiana House of Representatives
Preceded by Danny Ray Mitchell	Louisiana State Representative for District 2 (Caddo Parish); Lydia Patrice Jackson; 2000–2004	Succeeded by Roy A. Burrell
