= Sam Jenkins (politician) =

American politician

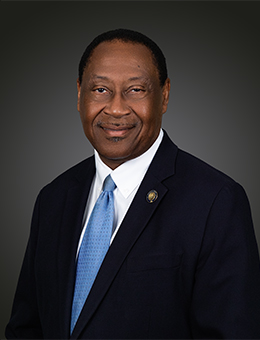

Member of the Louisiana Senate from the 39th district
- Incumbent
- Assumed office January 8, 2024
- Preceded by: Gregory Tarver

Minority Leader of the Louisiana House of Representatives
- In office January 13, 2020 – January 8, 2024
- Preceded by: Robert Johnson
- Succeeded by: Matthew Willard

Member of the Louisiana House of Representatives from the 2nd district
- In office January 11, 2016 – January 8, 2024
- Preceded by: Roy A. Burrell
- Succeeded by: Steven Jackson

Personal details
- Born: Samuel Lee Jenkins Jr.
- Party: Democratic
- Education: Southern University (BA, JD)

Samuel Lee Jenkins Jr. is an American politician serving as a Democratic member for the 39th district of the Louisiana Senate. He previously represented the 2nd district in the Louisiana House of Representatives and served as the minority leader of the House from 2020 to 2024.

== Early life and education ==
Jenkins was born as Samuel Lee Jenkins Jr. He attended Southern University, where he earned a BA and a JD.

== Political career ==
=== Louisiana House of Representatives ===
Jenkins was elected to represent the 2nd district of the Louisiana House of Representatives in 2016, succeeding Roy A. Burrell. He assumed office on January 11, 2016. During his tenure, he was elected Minority Leader of the House in 2020, a position he held until January 2024.

=== Louisiana Senate ===
In November 2023, Jenkins was elected to represent the 39th district in the Louisiana Senate, defeating fellow Democratic House representative Cedric Glover in a runoff. He assumed office on January 8, 2024.

=== Legislative positions ===
Jenkins opposed Governor Jeff Landry's special session of the Louisiana Legislature on crime in the state, advocating instead for preventative measures due to concerns that the session's outcomes might lead to increased incarceration.

Louisiana House of Representatives
Preceded by Roy A. Burrell	Member of the Louisiana House of Representatives from the 2nd district 2016–2024	Succeeded by Steven Jackson (politician)
Louisiana House of Representatives
Preceded by Robert Johnson	Minority Leader of the Louisiana House of Representatives; 2020–2024	Succeeded by Matthew Willard
Louisiana State Senate
Preceded by Gregory Tarver	Member of the Louisiana Senate from the 39th district 2024–present	Incumbent
