= Hazel Beard =

American politician (1930–2022)

Hazel Fain Tilley Beard

Mayor of Shreveport, Louisiana
- In office December 27, 1990 – December 27, 1994
- Preceded by: John Brennan Hussey
- Succeeded by: Robert Warren Williams

Shreveport City Council member
- In office 1986–1990
- Succeeded by: Robert Warren Williams

Personal details
- Born: Hazel Fain; September 16, 1930 Franklin Parish, Louisiana
- Died: December 26, 2022 (aged 92) Marble Falls, Texas, U.S.
- Party: Republican
- Spouse(s): (1) Ira James Tilley (died) (2) Charles Carroll Beard, Sr.
- Children: Terri Moore Marcia Jaudon Charles Beard, Jr.
- Occupation: Businesswoman

Hazel Beard (née Fain; September 16, 1930 – December 26, 2022) was an American politician who was the first woman and the first Republican to have served as mayor of Shreveport, Louisiana, since the era of Reconstruction. Prior to her mayoral service, Beard was a small business owner and a member of the Shreveport City Council from the southwest portion of the city. She was the first woman to have been chairperson of the city council.

== 1990 election ==
Beard entered the 1990 mayoral race against three serious opponents, including C.O. Simpkins and two fellow council members, Republican Carolyn Calhoun Whitehurst and Democrat Bill Bush. Bush, a businessman, led in the pre-election polls.

Simpkins led in the primary with 31 percent of the ballots cast, but Beard secured the second slot to proceed to the general election. In the second round of balloting, Beard prevailed winning 38,604 votes (59 percent) to Simpkins' 26,341 (41 percent).

== Mayorship ==
Soon after taking office, Beard appointed Steve Prator, a 17-year member of the Shreveport Police Department as chief of police, a position that he held until 1999. Prator successfully sought the office of Caddo Parish sheriff and became the first Republican since Reconstruction to hold that position. He won a sixth term in the primary election held on October 12, 2019. Beard appointed Republican activist Harriet Belchic to the Shreveport Women's Commission and the Riverfront Redevelopment Advisory Committee. The panel completed Riverfront Park although it was poorly designed and unable to withstand seasonal overflows of the nearby Red River. Rising waters would flood the fountains in the park and interfere with the operation of the waterpumps.

Mayor Beard had often expressed her opposition to any form of legalized riverboat gambling legislation for which then Governor Edwin Edwards had sought legislative approval. Shreveport-Bossier received five gaming licenses, and the area stood to benefit financially from such efforts. Beard hence changed her position and announced her support for one riverboat operation in Shreveport. The Beard administration granted the first riverboat gambling license in Shreveport history to Harrah's. At the opening of the casino, Edwards could be overheard at the podium expressing his displeasure with Beard's anti-gaming comments and was reported to have told Beard during a chat at the dais that he (Edwards) "...had never had he worked with nor known a Louisiana mayor who was as stupid as she..."

== Personal life ==
After the death of her first husband, Ira James Tilley, Hazel Beard was remarried to Charles Carroll Beard, Sr., until his death in 2002. After her term as mayor ended, the Beards moved to Kingsland, Texas. She later lived in East Texas.

=== Education ===
Beard received her college degree from Louisiana State University in Shreveport in 1985 at the age of fifty-five. In 2007, she received the LSU-S "Distinguished Alumnus Award" when she delivered the commencement address in a ceremony at the CenturyTel Center in Bossier City. Beard has been active in such groups as Mothers Against Drunk Driving and the Christian Women's Job Corps. Her archival papers and other material is located at LSUS.

=== Death ===
Beard died in Marble Falls on December 26, 2022, at the age of 92.

| Preceded by John Brennan Hussey | Mayor of Shreveport, Louisiana; 1990–1994 | Succeeded by Robert W. "Bo" Williams |

== Sources ==
- James C. Gardner, Jim Gardner and Shreveport, Vol. II (Shreveport: Ritz Publications, 2006), pp. 289–90
