= Tom Arceneaux =

Mayor of Shreveport since 2022

57th Mayor of Shreveport
- Incumbent
- Assumed office December 31, 2022
- Preceded by: Adrian Perkins

Shreveport City Council Member
- Incumbent
- Assumed office 1982

Personal details
- Born: October 8, 1951 (age 75)
- Spouse: Elizabeth Arceneaux
- Education: Louisiana State University (BA) Paul M. Hebert Law Center (JD)

Martin Thomas Arceneaux (born October 8, 1951) is an American politician and lawyer who has served as the mayor of Shreveport. A member of the Republican Party, he was on the Shreveport City Council representing District C from 1982 to 1990. He also served as the Shreveport Assistant City Attorney.

== Early life and education ==
Arceneaux was not born in Shreveport. He and his family traveled frequently due to his father, Felix, working for New York Life. After moving to Shreveport, he spent his junior and senior years at Captain Shreve High School. He was the manager of the football team and sport's editor in the student newspaper. He went to Louisiana State University in Baton Rouge. He earned his Juris Doctor degree from the Paul M. Hebert Law Center in 1976.

== Law career and City Council ==
After graduating law school, he clerked for U.S District Judge Tom Stagg. He got appointed as the Shreveport Assistant City Attorney in 1995 by Bo Williams, the mayor at the time. In 1982, he was elected to the Shreveport City Council to represent District C. In 1986 he was elected of Chair of the City Council.

== Mayor ==
Arceneaux was sworn in on December 31, 2022. One of the first things he did in office was to order the demolition of 35 abandoned buildings though his "Block by Block" initiative. In June 2024, One of his notable ordinances was to require owners of vacant buildings downtown to register their properties with the city and maintain them in accordance with new standards. He also proposed new bonds, which were passed by voters to improve city roads, the water system, and public safety buildings.

== Personal life ==
Arceneaux is married to Elizabeth Arceneaux, when they got introduced on a blind date in 1992. They were married the next year.

== Electoral history ==
2022 Shreveport mayoral general election
Party	Candidate	Votes	%
Republican	Tom Arceneaux	14,709	28.46%
Democratic	Gregory Tarver	12,202	23.61%
Independent	Mario Chavez	9,458	18.30%
Democratic	Adrian Perkins (incumbent)	9,090	17.59%
Democratic	LeVette Fuller	5,029	9.73%
Democratic	Tracy Mendels	379	0.73%
Democratic	Darryl Ware	298	0.58%
Libertarian	Lauren Ray Anderson	233	0.45%
Republican	Melvin Slack	147	0.28%
Independent	Julius Romano	132	0.26%
Total votes		51,677	100%

2022 Shreveport mayoral runoff
Party	Candidate	Votes	%
Republican	Tom Arceneaux	20,724	56.37%
Democratic	Gregory Tarver	16,040	43.63%
Total votes		36,764	100
Republican gain from Democratic			
