= William Keith (Louisiana politician) =

American politician

Member of the Louisiana State Senate
- In office 1980–1984
- Succeeded by: Gregory Tarver

Personal details
- Born: August 19, 1934 (age 92) Jay, Oklahoma, U.S.
- Party: Democratic
- Education: Wheaton College; Southwestern Baptist Theological Seminary

William Keith (born August 19, 1934), also known as Billy Keith, is an American politician. He served as a Democratic member of the Louisiana State Senate.

== Life and career ==
Keith was born in Jay, Oklahoma. He attended Wheaton College and Southwestern Baptist Theological Seminary.

Keith served in the Louisiana State Senate from 1980 to 1984.
