= Adrian Perkins =

American politician

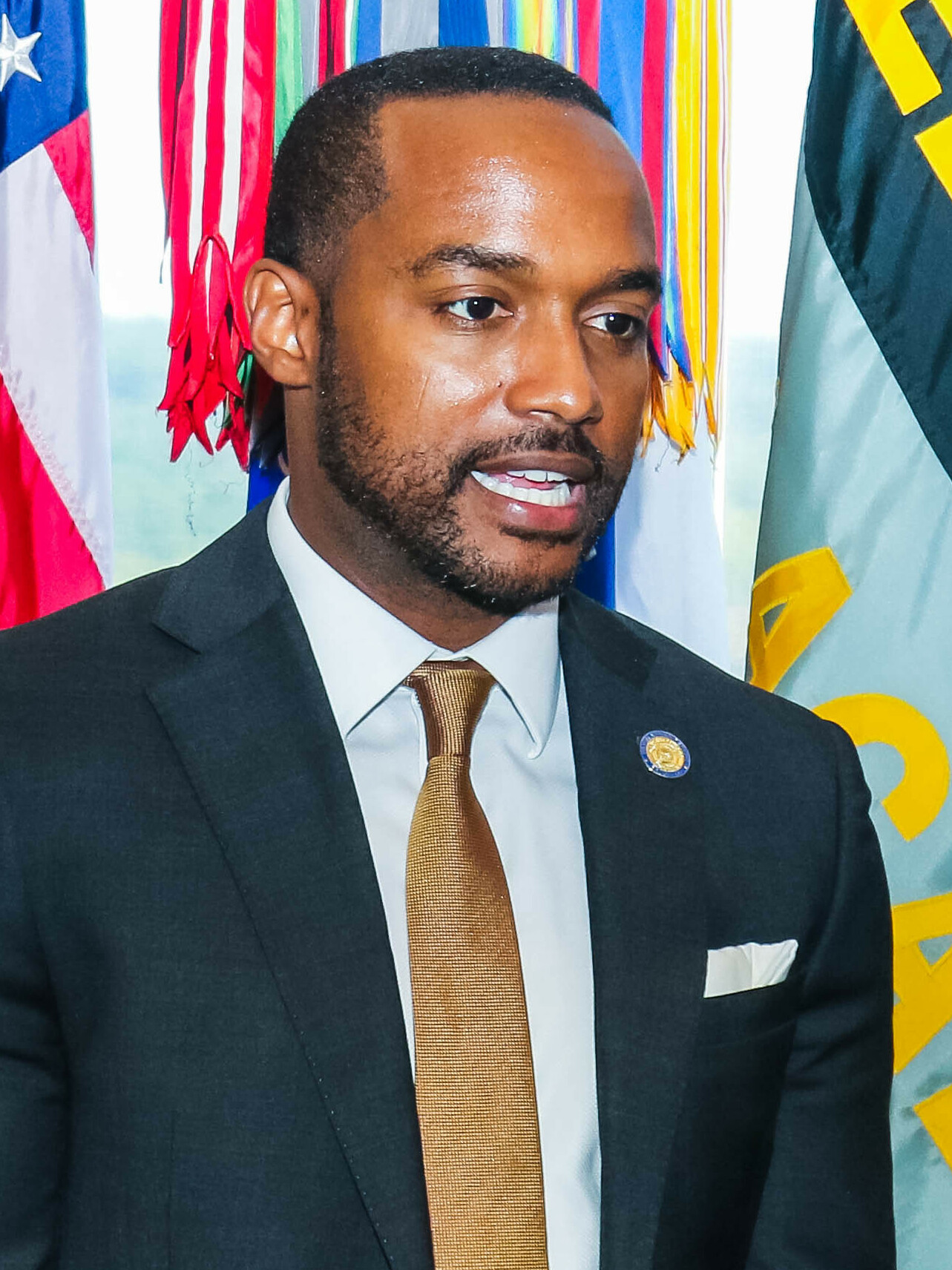

Mayor of Shreveport
- In office December 29, 2018 – December 31, 2022
- Preceded by: Ollie Tyler
- Succeeded by: Tom Arceneaux

Personal details
- Born: October 23, 1985 (age 41) Shreveport, Louisiana, U.S.
- Party: Democratic
- Education: United States Military Academy (BS); Harvard University (JD)

Military service
- Allegiance: United States
- Branch/service: United States Army
- Years of service: 2008–2015
- Rank: Captain
- Awards: Bronze Star

Adrian Perkins (born October 23, 1985) is an American politician who served as the mayor of Shreveport, Louisiana. Perkins is a graduate of both the United States Military Academy at West Point and Harvard Law School, and is an Army veteran. He ran for the United States Senate in 2020, losing to incumbent Republican Bill Cassidy.

== Early life and education ==
Adrian Perkins is the grandson of a Bossier Parish sharecropper and the youngest of three boys born to Johnny Oliver and Archie Perkins. He was raised in the Broadmoor neighborhood of Shreveport. He attended Arthur Circle, Youree Drive Middle School, and Captain Shreve High School where he was a member of the student council and the varsity football, basketball and track and field teams. Perkins was all-state in track and field in high school.

Inspired to join the United States Army following the September 11 attacks, Perkins sought and received an appointment to the United States Military Academy, a United States service academy located in West Point, New York. While at West Point, Perkins was elected as the class president, becoming the first African American cadet to graduate to serve as class president in the 215-year history of the institution.

== Military service ==
Upon graduation from West Point, Perkins was commissioned as a field artillery officer and posted at Fort Stewart, Georgia. During his career, Perkins was also posted at Fort Sill, Fort Benning, and Fort Campbell and served deployments to Iraq and Afghanistan.

Perkins served eight years in the Army, completing Ranger training, achieving the rank of captain, and serving as a company commander.

Adrian Perkins is a Bronze Star recipient.

== 2018 mayoral race ==
On April 26, 2018, Perkins announced his candidacy for Mayor of Shreveport, Louisiana.

On November 6, 2018, Perkins finished first with 17,466 votes and 28.86% in the blanket primary, but did not garner the required 50 percent plus one vote to win outright.

On December 8, 2018, Perkins handily defeated incumbent Ollie Tyler in the runoff to become the 58th mayor of Shreveport. He is Shreveport's third consecutive black mayor and the second youngest mayor in the city's history.

== Political positions ==
=== Public safety ===
Public safety was one of three major planks in Perkins's mayoral campaign platform. He stressed the need for more community-oriented policing that focuses on positive, relationship building non-law enforcement interactions between police and citizens. During his first year in office, Part I crime fell 8 percent and reached its lowest point since 1975. Homicides saw the sharpest decline, down 29 percent from 2018.

Mayor Perkins and Chief Technology Officer Keith Hanson were also able to roll savings from cuts to city phone contracts into FirstNet onsite internet for police officers and fire fighters.

=== Economic development ===
Perkins focused on expanding Shreveport's healthcare corridor. He also worked to expand Shreveport's budding aviation maintenance industry and the local tech sector. In July 2019, Indiana-based SuperATV announced a $4.35 million investment at its Shreveport site, bringing 117 direct and indirect jobs.

=== Technology ===
Mayor Perkins campaigned on a smart-city platform. Once in office, he appointed the city's first Chief Technology Officer, Keith Hanson, a former software executive. Perkins's administration used technology to create an online interactive city budget, dubbed the "People's Budget." Under Perkins's leadership, the city hired its first data-scientist who discovered an accounting oversight from previous administrations that disclosed several million dollars, which was used to bolster the city's anemic reserve fund. The IT department also renegotiated its phone contracts, saving the city tens of thousands of dollars.

=== Municipal budget ===
Mayor Perkins inherited a $1.2 million deficit. To address this issue, the Perkins administration cut expenditures and increased revenues. Perkins' first proposed budget was passed by City Council on December 10, 2019, and it was Shreveport's first balanced budget in nearly a decade. This budget cut expenditures by 4.5 percent and was projected to bring the city's Operating Reserves up from the $1.2 million deficit in 2019 to a $2.6 million surplus by the end of 2020.

Perkins called for a monthly sanitation fee for residential and commercial garbage pick-up to be added to municipal water bills to provide sanitation workers with a pay raise and to reduce the $8.4 million subsidy from the general fund for curbside solid waste collection. The City Council passed a $7 user-fee increased on March 26, 2019.

As a result of the economic crisis caused by the COVID-19 Pandemic, the City of Shreveport experienced a projected $25 million shortfall. The Perkins administration was able to avoid furloughing or laying off city employees or eliminating essential services by proposing $25 million in cuts, including everything from "non-personnel-related expenditures to deferred capital projects and funded vacancies in nearly every department."

=== COVID-19 response ===
Mayor Perkins was quick to act in response to the COVID-19 Pandemic. He utilized technology to geo-locate cases of COVID-19 in the City of Shreveport, noticing a concentration in densely populated, predominately African-American neighborhoods. Mayor Perkins immediately shifted resources and messaging to increase awareness of the virus and promote safe practices in these areas. He drew attention to the disproportionate toll exacted on communities of color by the virus. His response garnered national attention and a front-page story in the Washington Post.

=== Pants sagging ordinance ===
Perkins announced in May 2019 that he opposes his city's ban on persons wearing saggy pants in public. The Shreveport City Council introduced legislation to repeal the ordinance, eventually voting to repeal on June 11, 2019. The matter promptly attracted national attention. Opposition stemmed from the fact that 98 percent of those arrested for violation of the ordinance are Black, and 100 percent of youth cited for violation of the law are Black.

=== Insurance change ===
Mayor Perkins changed the city's insurance policy. His stated goal was to "inject competition into the process and ensure that minorities, disadvantaged business owners, and Shreveport’s middle class—people who have been excluded from government work for decades—received the same opportunities as everyone else." This new policy with the Frost Company cost more for less coverage. The change took place the day before he officially took office, apparently through a staff error.

== 2020 U.S. Senate campaign ==
On July 22, 2020, Perkins announced that he was running for the United States Senate in 2020, challenging incumbent Republican Bill Cassidy. Perkins was endorsed by former President Barack Obama, Governor John Bel Edwards, Democratic vice presidential nominee Kamala Harris, and former presidential candidates Elizabeth Warren, Pete Buttigieg, and Cory Booker. Perkins also received endorsements from VoteVets, the Democratic Senatorial Campaign Committee and the Executive Committee of the Democratic (Louisiana) State Central Committee. Other notable endorsements included former U.S. Senators J. Bennett Johnston and Mary Landrieu, former New Orleans Mayor Mitch Landrieu, and veteran Democratic Party strategist Donna Brazile.

Mayor Perkins cited the pandemic and Cassidy's lack of leadership as the reasons for his Senate bid, saying, "This is a moment for strong, decisive leadership in Washington. The pain and suffering I've seen has driven me to this decision...we can't afford to give Sen. Cassidy another chance."

However, Perkins' run for the senate was not successful. On November 3, 2020, Cassidy was re-elected with 59.3% of the vote; Perkins received 19%.

== Awards ==
On Nov. 8, 2019, the Pat Tillman Foundation honored Perkins with the organization's 2019 Make Your Mark Award "for embodying the values of service, scholarship, humble leadership and impact in [his] work and daily life."

Party political offices
Preceded by Mary Landrieu	Democratic nominee for U.S. Senator from Louisiana (Class 2); 2020; Served alongside: Derrick Edwards	Succeeded by Jamie Davis
