= 2020 United States Senate election in Louisiana =

- November 3, 2020
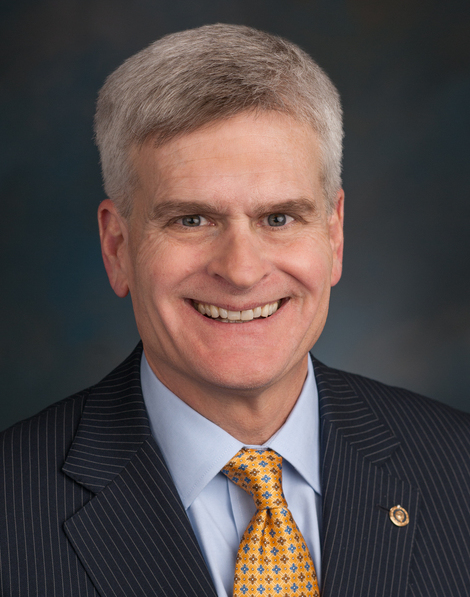

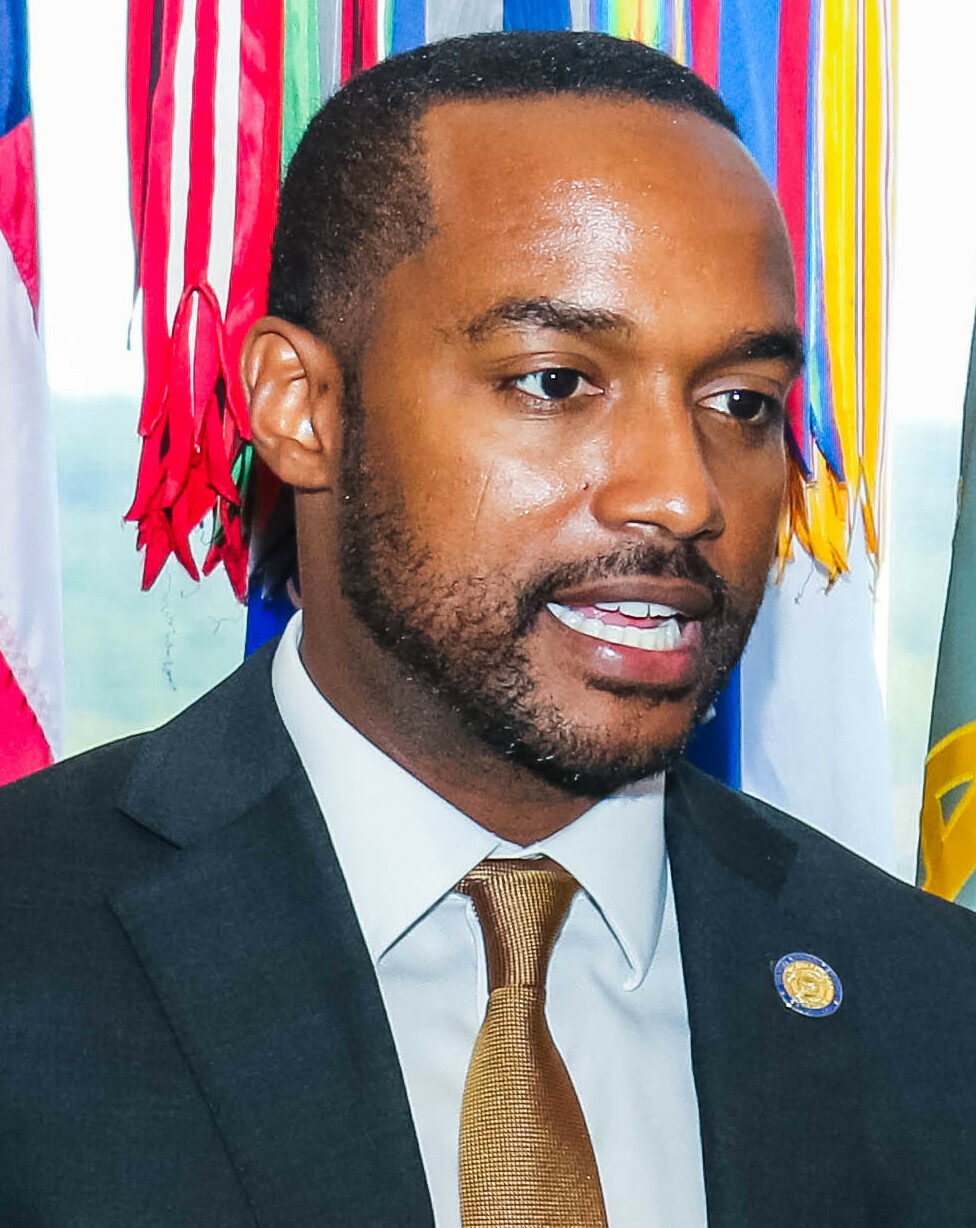

Candidate	Bill Cassidy	Adrian Perkins	Derrick Edwards
Party	Republican	Democratic	Democratic
Popular vote	1,228,908	394,049	229,814
Percentage	59.32%	19.02%	11.09%
- Cassidy: 20–30% 30–40% 40–50% 50–60% 60–70% 70–80% 80–90% >90% Perkins: 20–30% 30–40% 40–50% 50–60% 60–70% 70–80% 80–90% Edwards: 20–30% 30–40% 40–50% 50–60% Pierce: 30–40% Tie: 20–30% 30–40% 40–50% 50% No votes
U.S. senator before election
Bill Cassidy
Republican
Elected U.S. Senator
Bill Cassidy
Republican

The 2020 United States Senate election in Louisiana was held on November 3, 2020, to elect a member of the United States Senate to represent the State of Louisiana, concurrently with the 2020 U.S. presidential election, as well as other elections to the United States Senate, elections to the United States House of Representatives and various state and local elections. A blanket primary was held on November 3, 2020; if no candidate had won a majority of the vote in the blanket primary, then a runoff election would have been held on December 5.

== Candidates ==
=== Republican Party ===
==== Declared ====
- Bill Cassidy, incumbent U.S. senator
- Dustin Murphy, welder

=== Democratic Party ===
Though there were multiple Democratic candidates, the one with the most institutional support was Shreveport Mayor Adrian Perkins, who had the endorsements of the Louisiana Democratic Party and the Democratic Senatorial Campaign Committee and would end up receiving the nomination.

==== Declared ====
- Derrick Edwards, perennial candidate
- Drew Knight
- Adrian Perkins, mayor of Shreveport
- Antoine Pierce, community activist
- Peter Wenstrup, teacher

==== Withdrew ====
- Dartanyon Williams, businessman and author (running for Louisiana's 6th congressional district)

==== Declined ====
- Mary Landrieu, former U.S. senator
- Mitch Landrieu, former mayor of New Orleans

==== Endorsements ====
Adrian Perkins (D)

Federal officials

- Barack Obama, 44th president of the United States

State officials

- John Bel Edwards, Governor of Louisiana

Local officials

- Pete Buttigieg, former mayor of South Bend, Indiana (2012–2020)

Organizations

- DSCC
- Louisiana Democratic Party
- VoteVets

U.S. senators

- Cory Booker, U.S. senator from New Jersey (2013–present)
- Kamala Harris, U.S. senator from California (2017–2021) and Democratic 2020 vice presidential nominee
Antoine Pierce (D)

Individuals

- Andrew Yang, businessman, entrepreneur, non-profit leader and 2020 presidential candidate

Organizations

- DUH! Demand Universal Healthcare
- Humanity Forward

=== Libertarian Party ===
==== Declared ====
- Aaron Sigler, neurosurgeon

=== Independents ===
==== Declared ====
- Beryl Billiot, businessman
- John Paul Bourgeois
- Reno Jean Daret III
- Alexander "Xan" John, businessman and law student
- Jamar "Doc" Montgomery, attorney

==== Withdrew ====
- Gregory Fitch

== General election ==
=== Predictions ===
Source	Ranking	As of
The Cook Political Report	Safe R	October 29, 2020
Inside Elections	Safe R	October 28, 2020
Sabato's Crystal Ball	Safe R	November 2, 2020
Daily Kos	Safe R	October 30, 2020
Politico	Safe R	November 2, 2020
RCP	Safe R	October 23, 2020
DDHQ	Safe R	November 3, 2020
538	Safe R	November 2, 2020
Economist	Likely R	November 2, 2020

=== Polling ===
Poll source	Date(s) administered	Sample size (Note: Key: A – all adults RV – registered voters LV – likely voters V – unclear)	Margin of error	Bill Cassidy (R)	Dustin Murphy (R)	Adrian Perkins (D)	Antoine Pierce (D)	Other	Undecided
ALG Research (D) (Note: Poll sponsored by Adrians Perkins' campaign.)	August 6–12, 2020	800 (LV)	± 3.5%	42%	6%	17%	11%	3% (Note: Mendoza (I) with 2%; Sigler (L) with 1%)	21%

==== Head to head matchups ====
Bill Cassidy vs. Adrian Perkins

Poll source	Date(s) administered	Sample size	Margin of error	Bill Cassidy (R)	Adrian Perkins (D)	Undecided
ALG Research (D)	August 6–12, 2020	800 (LV)	± 3.5%	52%	33%	16%

Hypothetical polling

Bill Cassidy vs. generic opponent

Poll source	Date	Sample size	Margin of error	Bill Cassidy (R)	Generic Opponent	Undecided
Tyson Group/Consumer Energy Alliance (Note: The Consumer Energy Alliance is a pro-Keystone XL lobbying group)	September 2–5, 2020	600 (LV)	± 4%	38%	37%	24%
Tyson Group/Consumer Energy Alliance	March 16, 2020	– (V) (Note: Not yet released)	–	48%	25%	27%

Generic Republican vs. generic Democrat

Poll source	Date	Sample size	Margin of error	Generic Republican	Generic Democrat	Other	Undecided
ALG Research (D)	August 6–12, 2020	800 (LV)	± 3.5%	43%	33%	2% (Note: "Neither" with 2%)	23% (Note: "It depends" with 19%; "Don't know" with 4%)

=== Results ===
United States Senate election blanket primary in Louisiana, 2020
Party	Candidate	Votes	%
Republican	Bill Cassidy (incumbent)	1,228,908	59.32%
Democratic	Adrian Perkins	394,049	19.02%
Democratic	Derrick Edwards	229,814	11.09%
Democratic	Antoine Pierce	55,710	2.69%
Republican	Dustin Murphy	38,383	1.85%
Democratic	Drew Knight	36,962	1.78%
Independent	Beryl Billiot	17,362	0.84%
Independent	John Paul Bourgeois	16,518	0.8%
Democratic	Peter Wenstrup	14,454	0.7%
Libertarian	Aaron Sigler	11,321	0.55%
Independent	M.V. "Vinny" Mendoza	7,811	0.38%
Independent	Melinda Mary Price	7,680	0.37%
Independent	Jamar Montgomery	5,804	0.28%
Independent	Reno Jean Daret III	3,954	0.19%
Independent	Alexander "Xan" John	2,813	0.14%
Total votes		2,071,543	100%
Republican hold			

==== By parish ====
Parish	Bill Cassidy Republican		Adrian Perkins Democratic		Derrick Edwards Democratic		Antoine Pierce Democratic		Various candidates Other parties		Margin		Total
Parish	#	%	#	%	#	%	#	%	#	%	#	%	Total
Acadia	21,640	78.7%	2,243	8.2%	1,499	5.5%	285	1.0%	1,832	6.7%	19,397	70.5%	27,499
Allen	7,077	75.1%	483	5.1%	926	9.8%	143	1.5%	794	8.4%	6,151	65.3% (Note: Compares margin over Edwards.)	9,423
Ascension	40,141	66.2%	8,539	14.1%	6,057	10.0%	1,327	2.2%	4,563	7.5%	31,602	52.1%	60,627
Assumption	6,884	64.9%	1,452	13.7%	1,340	12.6%	167	1.6%	759	7.2%	5,432	51.2%	10,602
Avoyelles	11,330	69.5%	1,551	9.5%	1,766	10.8%	232	1.4%	1,434	8.8%	9,564	58.7%	16,313
Beauregard	12,485	79.2%	607	3.9%	992	6.3%	225	1.4%	1,446	9.2%	11,493	72.9%	15,755
Bienville	3,729	54.7%	2,068	30.3%	517	7.6%	95	1.4%	405	5.9%	1,661	24.4%	6,814
Bossier	36,931	69.4%	9,834	18.5%	2,511	4.7%	613	1.2%	3,311	6.2%	27,097	50.9%	53,200
Caddo	48,007	47.0%	36,282	35.6%	8,590	8.4%	2,912	2.9%	6,255	6.1%	11,725	7.4%	102,046
Calcasieu	52,888	65.9%	5,910	7.4%	11,082	13.8%	2,033	2.5%	8,354	10.4%	41,806	52.1%	80,267
Caldwell	3,590	78.3%	218	4.8%	268	5.8%	50	1.1%	460	10.0%	3,322	74.5%	4,586
Cameron	3,411	86.7%	70	1.8%	129	3.3%	17	0.4%	309	7.9%	3,268	83.4%	3,936
Catahoula	3,312	71.7%	539	11.7%	377	8.2%	65	1.4%	329	7.1%	2,773	60.0%	4,622
Claiborne	3,722	59.2%	1,605	25.5%	499	7.9%	86	1.4%	374	5.9%	2,117	33.7%	6,286
Concordia	5,163	62.6%	1,185	14.4%	1,073	13.0%	100	1.2%	731	8.9%	3,978	48.2%	8,252
De Soto	8,750	61.0%	3,744	26.1%	651	4.5%	128	0.9%	1,063	7.4%	5,006	34.9%	14,336
East Baton Rouge	93,514	45.9%	58,688	28.8%	29,504	14.5%	8,540	4.2%	13,708	6.7%	34,826	17.1%	203,954
East Carroll	1,150	40.1%	703	24.5%	560	19.5%	79	2.8%	376	13.1%	447	15.6%	2,868
East Feliciana	6,040	59.8%	1,784	17.7%	1,296	12.8%	196	1.9%	781	7.7%	4,256	42.1%	10,097
Evangeline	10,374	72.2%	1,418	9.9%	1,307	9.1%	162	1.1%	1,114	7.7%	8,956	62.3%	14,375
Franklin	6,765	72.7%	839	9.0%	729	7.8%	271	2.9%	703	7.6%	5,926	63.7%	9,307
Grant	7,580	83.8%	316	3.5%	435	4.8%	55	0.6%	661	7.3%	7,145	79.0%	9,047
Iberia	20,399	65.4%	4,294	13.8%	3,076	9.9%	885	2.8%	2,526	8.1%	16,105	51.6%	31,180
Iberville	7,907	50.0%	3,490	22.1%	2,490	15.7%	654	4.1%	1,277	8.1%	4,417	27.9%	15,818
Jackson	5,143	69.4%	989	13.4%	591	8.0%	97	1.3%	586	7.9%	4,154	56.0%	7,406
Jefferson	104,645	56.3%	37,965	20.4%	23,680	12.7%	4,564	2.5%	15,129	8.1%	66,680	25.9%	185,983
Jefferson Davis	10,937	76.2%	1,184	8.2%	988	6.9%	182	1.3%	1,068	7.4%	9,753	68.0%	14,359
La Salle	5,962	87.1%	190	2.8%	226	3.3%	31	0.5%	436	6.4%	5,736	83.9%	6,845
Lafayette	71,361	64.0%	17,762	15.9%	10,267	9.2%	3,372	3.0%	8,743	7.8%	53,599	48.1%	111,505
Lafourche	34,345	78.6%	2,869	6.6%	2,772	6.3%	576	1.3%	3,140	7.2%	31,476	72.0%	43,702
Lincoln	11,307	60.6%	3,052	16.4%	1,963	10.5%	591	3.2%	1,743	9.3%	8,255	44.2%	18,656
Livingston	52,385	82.2%	3,748	5.9%	2,629	4.1%	605	0.9%	4,397	6.9%	48,637	76.3%	63,764
Madison	1,990	44.8%	929	20.9%	886	20.0%	159	3.6%	477	10.7%	1,061	23.9%	4,441
Morehouse	6,288	57.5%	1,844	16.9%	1,562	14.3%	268	2.5%	970	8.9%	4,444	40.6%	10,932
Natchitoches	9,197	57.5%	3,605	22.6%	1,435	9.0%	284	1.8%	1,464	9.2%	5,592	34.9%	15,985
Orleans	29,745	17.7%	77,263	46.0%	33,660	20.0%	11,720	7.0%	15,547	9.3%	-43,603	-26.0%	167,935
Ouachita	41,472	62.2%	10,353	15.5%	7,325	11.0%	1,737	2.6%	5,839	8.8%	31,119	46.7%	66,726
Plaquemines	7,227	67.9%	1,259	11.8%	1,071	10.1%	202	1.9%	889	8.3%	5,968	56.1%	10,648
Pointe Coupee	7,445	63.3%	1,916	16.3%	1,341	11.4%	257	2.2%	803	6.8%	5,529	47.0%	11,762
Rapides	37,597	66.4%	6,544	11.6%	6,784	12.0%	1,205	2.1%	4,518	8.0%	30,813	52.4%	56,648
Red River	2,291	57.3%	1,194	29.9%	245	6.1%	43	1.1%	222	5.6%	1,097	27.4%	3,995
Richland	6,460	68.5%	1,043	11.1%	1,032	11.0%	169	1.8%	720	7.6%	5,417	57.4%	9,424
Sabine	8,176	80.3%	987	9.7%	374	3.7%	69	0.7%	574	5.6%	7,189	70.6%	10,180
St. Bernard	10,563	62.7%	1,992	11.8%	2,260	13.4%	434	2.6%	1,610	9.5%	8,303	49.3%	16,859
St. Charles	17,798	64.8%	3,687	13.4%	3,392	12.4%	616	2.2%	1,969	7.2%	14,111	51.4%	27,462
St. Helena	2,647	45.6%	1,386	23.9%	977	16.8%	122	2.1%	677	11.7%	1,261	21.7%	5,809
St. James	5,927	49.9%	2,753	23.2%	2,040	17.2%	310	2.6%	852	7.2%	3,174	26.7%	11,882
St. John the Baptist	7,518	37.0%	4,815	23.7%	5,355	26.4%	773	3.8%	1,834	9.0%	2,163	10.6%	20,295
St. Landry	22,285	57.3%	7,083	18.2%	5,127	13.2%	962	2.5%	3,460	8.9%	15,202	39.1%	38,917
St. Martin	17,457	67.5%	3,252	12.6%	2,522	9.8%	610	2.4%	2,020	7.8%	14,205	54.9%	25,861
St. Mary	14,062	63.3%	3,606	16.2%	2,017	9.1%	621	2.8%	1,897	8.5%	10,456	47.1%	22,203
St. Tammany	98,016	71.6%	15,777	11.5%	10,438	7.6%	2,525	1.8%	10,197	7.4%	82,239	60.1%	136,953
Tangipahoa	36,230	64.9%	7,842	14.0%	5,955	10.7%	822	1.5%	4,982	8.9%	28,388	50.9%	55,831
Tensas	1,210	50.3%	329	13.7%	528	22.0%	92	3.8%	245	10.2%	682	28.3%	2,404
Terrebonne	32,703	73.6%	4,255	9.6%	3,243	7.3%	700	1.6%	3,520	7.9%	28,448	64.0%	44,421
Union	7,992	74.6%	949	8.9%	785	7.3%	137	1.3%	849	7.9%	7,043	85.7%	10,712
Vermilion	20,644	78.9%	1,828	7.0%	1,415	5.4%	312	1.2%	1,982	7.6%	18,816	71.9%	26,181
Vernon	12,951	78.2%	794	4.8%	1,177	7.1%	200	1.2%	1,447	8.7%	11,774	71.1%	16,569
Washington	12,747	67.6%	2,386	12.7%	1,896	10.1%	267	1.4%	1,562	8.3%	10,361	54.9%	18,858
Webster	11,306	64.0%	4,079	23.1%	1,035	5.9%	162	0.9%	1,070	6.1%	7,227	30.9%	17,652
West Baton Rouge	7,804	56.9%	2,827	20.6%	1,821	13.3%	384	2.8%	875	6.4%	4,977	36.3%	13,711
West Carroll	3,999	82.8%	274	5.7%	198	4.1%	24	0.5%	336	7.0%	3,725	77.1%	4,831
West Feliciana	3,905	64.2%	1,017	16.7%	670	11.0%	117	1.9%	375	6.2%	2,888	47.5%	6,084
Winn	4,382	73.7%	560	9.4%	458	7.7%	69	1.2%	473	8.0%	3,822	64.1%	5,942
TOTALS	1,228,908	59.3%	394,049	19.0%	229,814	11.1%	55,710	2.7%	163,062	7.9%	834,859	40.3%	2,071,543

== Notes ==
Partisan clients
