= Louisiana's 39th State Senate district =

American legislative district

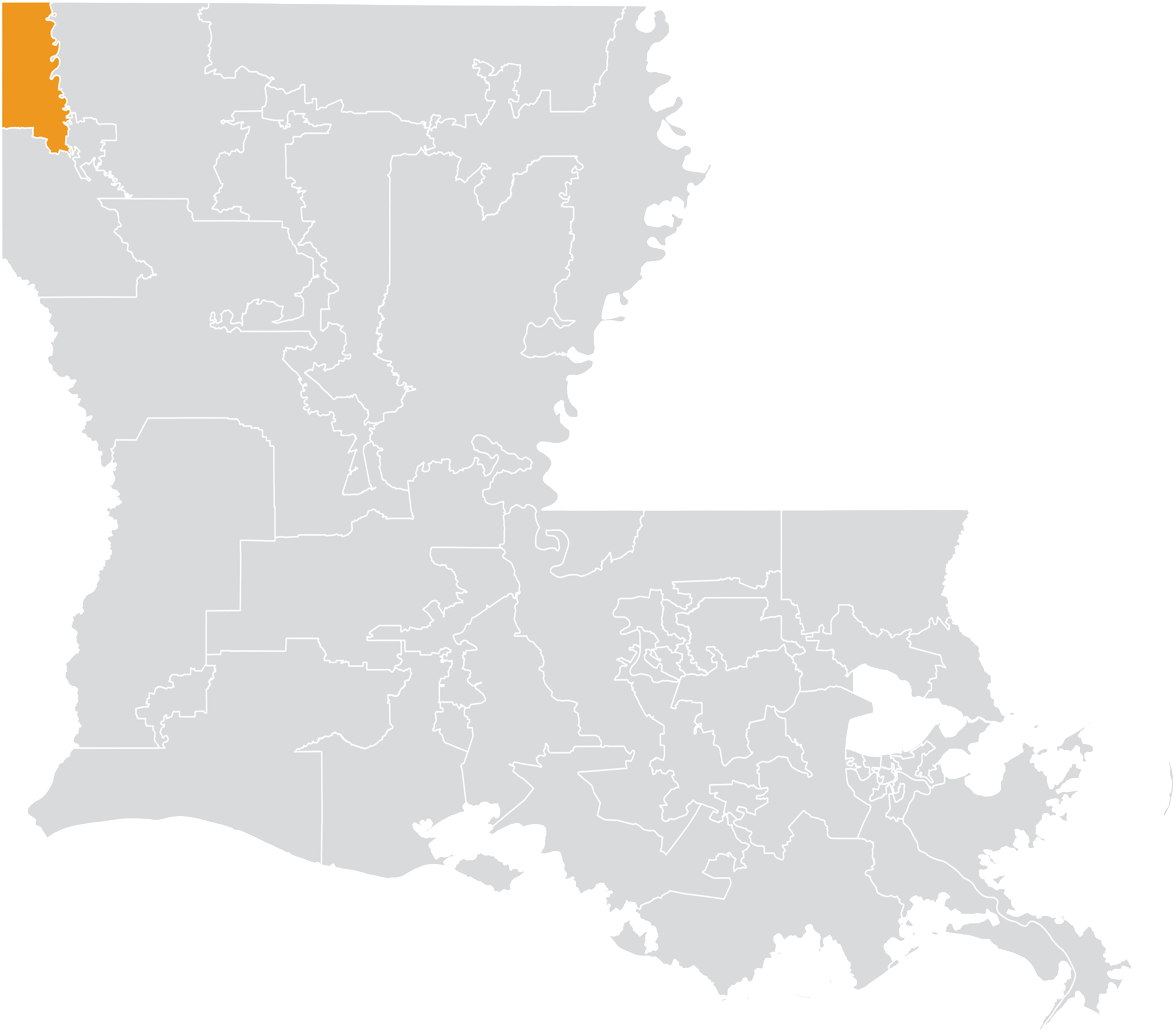
Senator
Gregory Tarver; D–Shreveport
- Registration: 60.5% Democratic; 16.0% Republican; 23.5% No party preference
- Demographics: 28% White; 67% Black; 2% Hispanic; 1% Asian; 1% Other
- Population (2019): 108,675
- Registered voters: 68,756

Louisiana's 39th State Senate district is one of 39 districts in the Louisiana State Senate. It has been represented by Democrat Gregory Tarver since 2012, following his defeat of incumbent fellow Democrat Lydia P. Jackson.

== Geography ==
District 39 covers the northern two-thirds of Caddo Parish in Ark-La-Tex, including most of Shreveport and all of Blanchard and Vivian.

The district is located entirely within Louisiana's 4th congressional district, and overlaps with the 1st, 2nd, 3rd, 4th, and 5th districts of the Louisiana House of Representatives.

== Recent election results ==
Louisiana uses a jungle primary system. If no candidate receives 50% in the first round of voting, when all candidates appear on the same ballot regardless of party, the top-two finishers advance to a runoff election.

=== 2019 ===
2019 Louisiana State Senate election, District 39
Party	Candidate	Votes	%
Democratic	Gregory Tarver (incumbent)	15,755	69.0
Republican	James Slagle	7,071	31.0
Total votes		22,826	100
Democratic hold			

=== 2015 ===
2015 Louisiana State Senate election, District 39
Party	Candidate	Votes	%
Democratic	Gregory Tarver (incumbent)	Unopposed	100
Total votes		Unopposed	100
Democratic hold			

=== 2011 ===
2011 Louisiana State Senate election, District 39
Primary election
Party	Candidate	Votes	%
Democratic	Lydia P. Jackson (incumbent)	9,393	43.4
Democratic	Gregory Tarver	9,015	41.6
Republican	James Slagle	3,259	15.0
Total votes		21,667	100
General election
Democratic	Gregory Tarver	9,168	52.5
Democratic	Lydia P. Jackson (incumbent)	8,295	47.5
Total votes		17,463	100
Democratic hold			

=== Federal and statewide results ===
Year	Office	Results
2020	President	Biden 67.1–31.4%
2019	Governor (runoff)	Edwards 73.0–27.0%
2016	President	Clinton 68.2–30.0%
2015	Governor (runoff)	Edwards 77.1–22.9%
2014	Senate (runoff)	Landrieu 73.5–26.5%
2012	President	Obama 72.1–27.2%
