= SuperATV =

Aftermarket vehicle products manufacturer

SuperATV, LLC
- This logo was copyrighted by SuperATV, LLC in 2013
- Industry: UTV and ATV aftermarket products
- Founded: 2003
- Founder: Harold Hunt
- Headquarters: Madison, Indiana, United States
- Brands: Rhino Brand Axles, GDP Portal Gear Lifts, Terminator Tires, Rack Boss
- Number of employees: 200 (2018)
- Website: superatv.com

SuperATV is a United States based privately owned company founded in 2003 headquartered in Madison, Indiana. The company sells aftermarket products for Utility task vehicles (UTVs) and all-terrain vehicles (ATVs). SuperATV is a family-run business located in a small Indiana town. The business has grown substantially from its founding to the current day.

SuperATV was acquired by Dorman in August 2022.

SuperATV also owns Assault Industries and GBoost Technology.

== Founding ==
Harold Hunt, an outdoor enthusiast with a background in manufacturing, created the first product, the 2" Polaris Sportsman EZ Install Lift Kit. The EZ Install Lift Kit was first designed, manufactured, and shipped out of Hunt's garage. As the popularity of side by sides (UTVs) grew with the release of the Yamaha Rhino in 2004 and the 2008 Polaris Ranger RZR, so did the demand for aftermarket UTV parts. SuperATV sells products for both all-terrain vehicles and utility task vehicles.

Hunt registered his LLC in 2003 and later trademarked the logo in 2013. He worked at Rotary lift for a total of 27 years before leaving to focus on his own business.

Hunt is also the owner of Clifty Warehouse & Storage, LLC, which provides storage for both commercial and industrial items. The Warehouse and SuperATV were once operating out of the same building until they both outgrew the shared space. Clifty Warehouse also has full-time employees and is a small business located in the same area.

== Location ==
Headquarters for SuperATV are in Madison, Indiana.

== New facilities and expansion ==
In 2016 SuperATV moved from its building on Clifty Drive to their new 232,000 square foot facility. This 4.95-million-dollar investment allowed the business to continue to expand and grow. The building was first built in 1958 and was used by several different manufacturing companies before US Filter vacated the building. SuperATV then bought, gutted, and renovated the building. Renovations for the building began in late 2015 and the company officially moved in 2016. In 2015, when the expansion was still in the works SuperATV projected that by the year 2018, they would be able to add at least one-hundred full-time jobs because of the expansion. The new building has a product testing lab, stocked product, in-house assembly, and a test track. Engineers create, build, and test prototypes all in the same facility. On-site product design and testing has allowed SuperATV to control quality.

SuperATV regularly partners with the Conexus Indiana program for manufacturing internships.

== Products ==
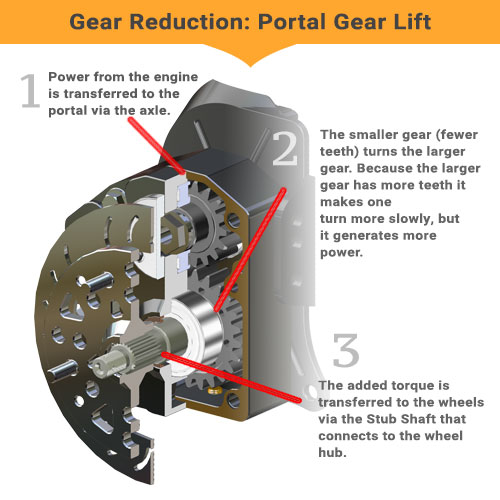

SuperATV is web based company predominantly serving its customers online and over the phone. They sell products for UTV's and ATV's in the side-by-side industry including brands such as Polaris, Can-Am, Yamaha, Honda, Kawasaki, Arctic Cat, Suzuki The first product sold was the 2” Polaris Sportsman EZ Install Lift Kit, there have been major product advancements since then. The first lift kit was a bolt on kit that added about 2 inches of clearance when added with stock tires, now Super ATV sells lift kits that add up to ten inches of clearance. The Polaris Sportsman lift kit was originally designed because Hunt wanted a quality lift kit for his own ride. After the first kits saw some success with friends, he began selling them on eBay. Hunt quickly realized the demand for products was growing and the company's product line expanded. Currently, their product line includes windshields, tires, portal gear lift kits, clutch kits, axles, and more.

All of the products sold on their own website are their own with the one exception of MTX speakers. For the majority of SuperATV's history, sales were based on consumer direct purchases. Now their products are not only sold on the SuperATV website, but also through dealers. Everything on their website is kept in-stock at their facility in Madison, Indiana. This reduces shipping time, so products arrive quickly after order. These products are often branded and trademarked by SuperATV. Some sub-brands include Rhino Axles, GDP Portals, Intimidator Tires, Rack Boss, and more.

== Team SuperATV ==
In 2015, SuperATV sponsored professional drivers Mitch Guthrie Jr., Mitch Guthrie Sr,. Sara Price, and Katie Vernola. Guthrie Jr. won the off-road challenge at King of the Hammers in 2018. He used SuperATV's Rhino Axles on his vehicle. This course was particularly rough in comparison to years past, as only ten percent of the riders made it to the finish. Guthrie Sr. had won the race six times in his career.

In 2016, a team of employee drivers led by Tyler Greves, an employee at SuperATV and professional driver, competed in the World Championships at King of the Hammers. SuperATV also holds their own events and sponsors races.
