= Meharry Medical College School of Dentistry =

Dental school in Nashville, Tennessee

Coordinates: 36.16786°N 86.80666°W

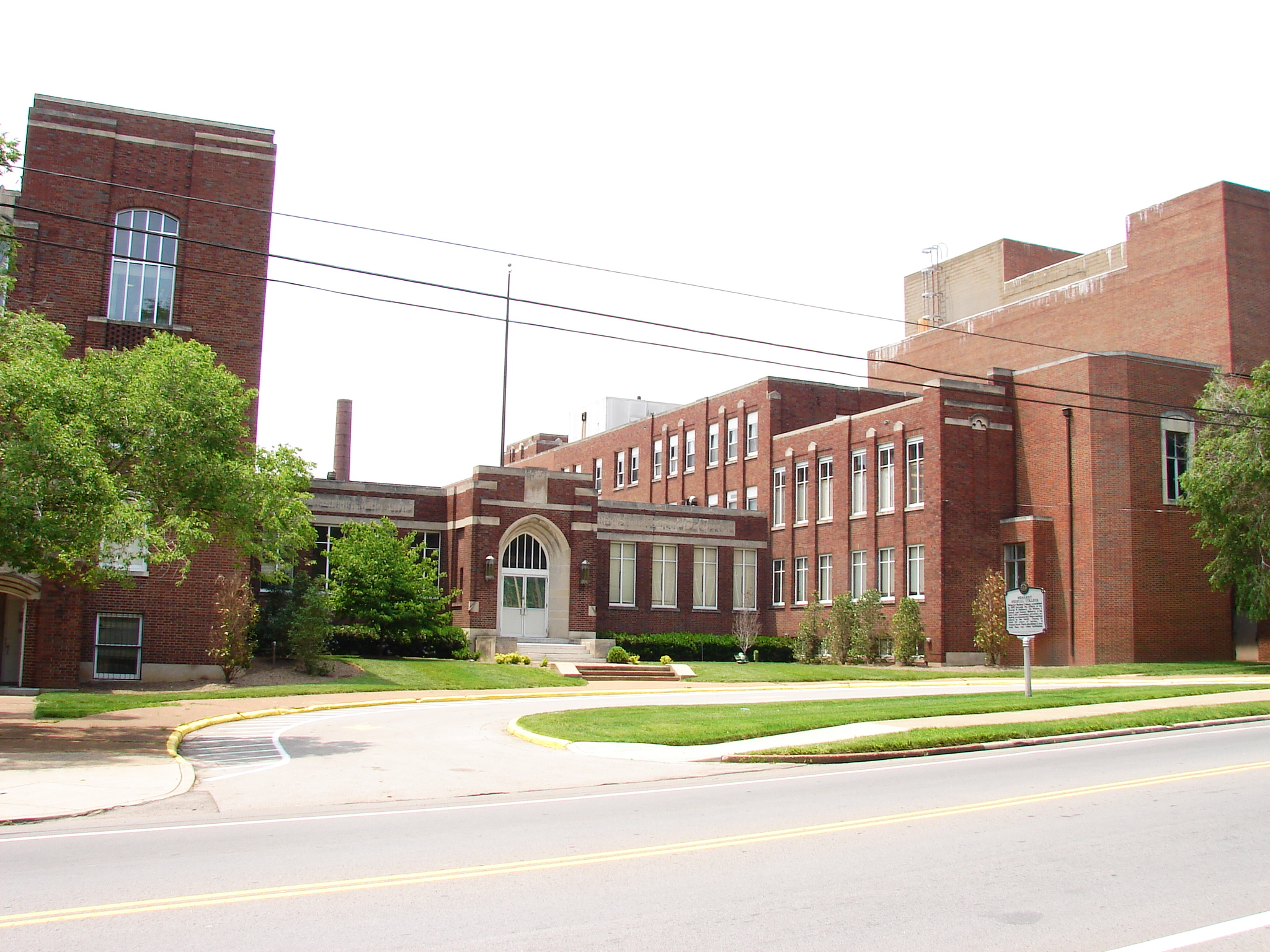
- Motto: Worship of God Through Service to Mankind
- Type: Private university
- Established: 1886
- Dean: Dr. Cherae M. Farmer-Dixon, D.D.S., M.S.P.H.
- Students: 200
- Location: Nashville, TN, U.S.
- Specialty Programs: Oral & Maxillofacial Surgery& General Practice Residency
- Colors: Maroon and White
- Website: www.mmc.edu/patientcare/school-of-dentistry/

The School of Dentistry is a dental school within Meharry Medical College located in the United States city of Nashville, Tennessee.

== History ==
Meharry Medical College School of Dentistry is a part of Meharry Medical College. The school was established in 1886, ten years after the medical college was established. According to the Meharry Medical College website, the dental school was founded by Dr. George Whipple Hubbard in order to "provide the Colored people of the South with an opportunity for thoroughly preparing themselves for the practice of dentistry." The first degrees were awarded in 1887 to three recipients, one of whom was Robert Fulton Boyd.

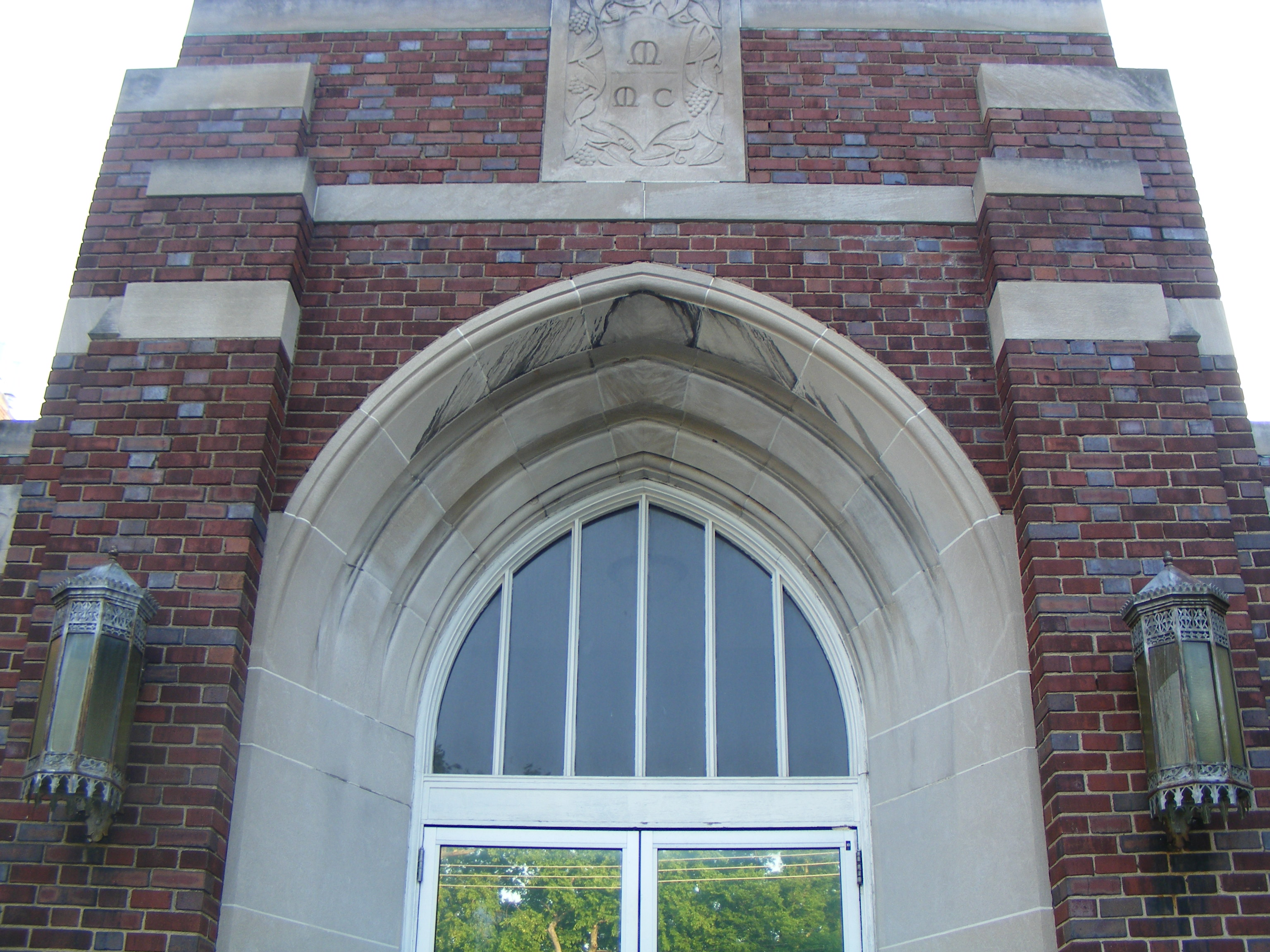
Meharry Medical College School of Dentistry.

== Academics ==
Meharry Medical College School of Dentistry awards following degrees:

- Doctor of Dental Surgery

DDS Program
Bio-medical Science based, spanning a length of four years leading to a Doctor of Dental Surgery degree.
During the first two years, dental students take medical science courses along with students at the Meharry Medical College at the Harold Dadford West Basic Sciences Center. The final two years entails a curriculum of comprehensive clinical care.

The school offers an International Track Program, described on its website as "an advanced standing program for dentists who have completed their dental training outside of a Commission on Dental Accreditation (CODA) accredited U.S. or Canada dental program."

Together with the Meharry School of Graduate Studies and Research, the School of Dentistry offers a DDS/PhD dual degree program, which, according to the website, is intended for "clinical and research professionals seeking to identify and solve significant problems in oral health and/or its influence on overall health."

== Facilities ==
Meharry Medical College School of Dentistry is located on 1005 Doctor D B Todd Junior Boulevard, Nashville, TN. The College houses patient clinics, research and teaching facilities, educational programs, and administrative offices. The operatories are designed in modules, each containing a waiting room, offices, X-ray facilities, and a seminar room for instruction and consultation. These facilities enable the College to provide oral health care for Tennesseans. In 2014, the school unveiled the Henry Schein Cares Graduate Programs Residency Clinic, a facility with dental technology that can be used by students of the school to provide dental services to underserved community members.

== Graduate programs ==
Meharry Medical dental college offers an Advanced Education Program in Oral and Maxillofacial Surgery. The college also offers a program in General Practice Residency (GPR). Both programs are accredited by the Commission on Dental Accreditation of the American Dental Association.

== Departments ==
According to its website, Meharry Medical College School of Dentistry includes the following departments:

- Dental Public Health
- Endodontics
- Oral Biology & Research
- Oral and Maxillofacial Surgery
- Oral Diagnostic Sciences
- Pediatric Dentistry & Orthodontics
- Periodontics
- Restorative Dentistry (Prosthodontics and Operative Dentistry)

== Gallery ==
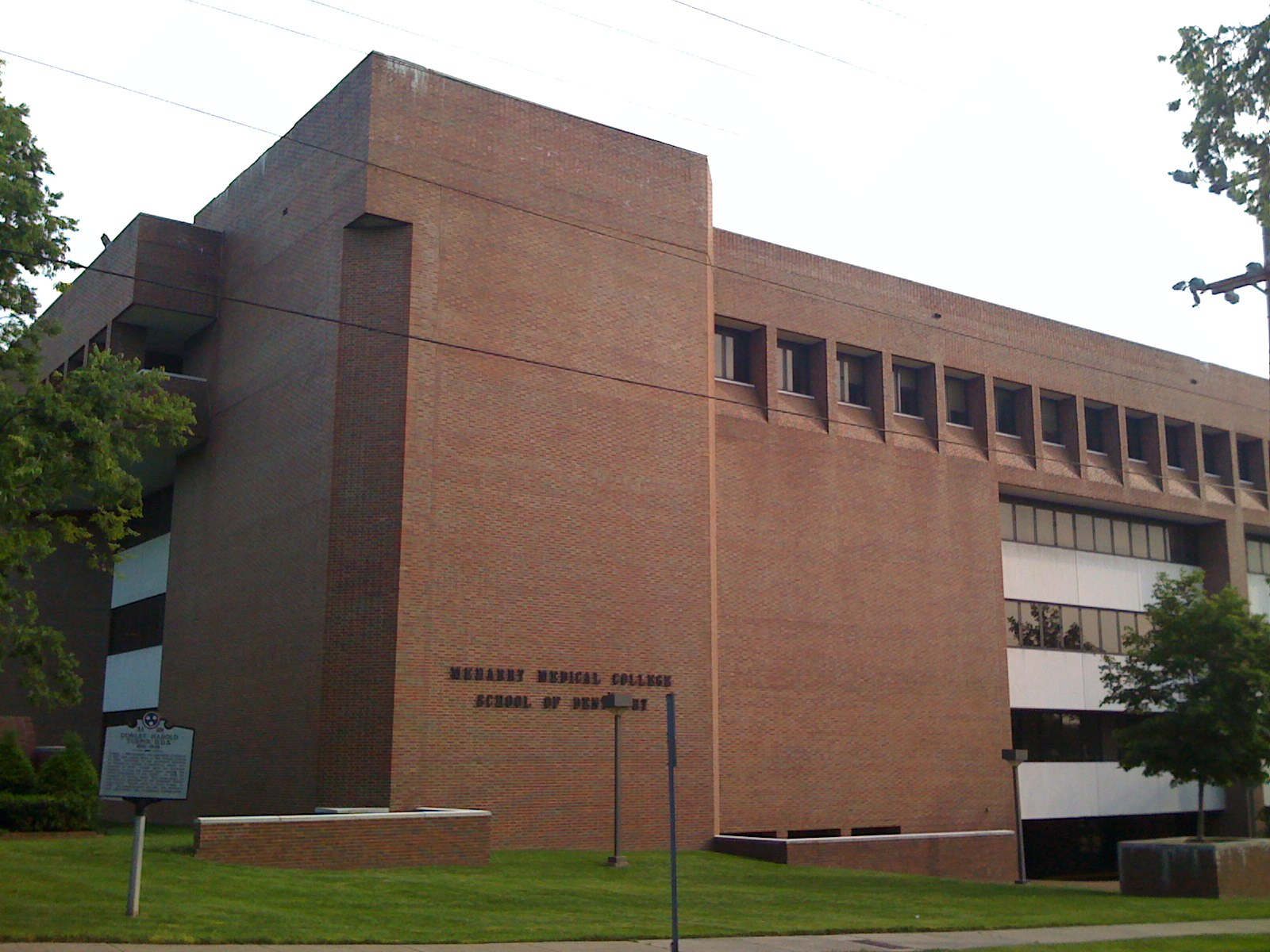

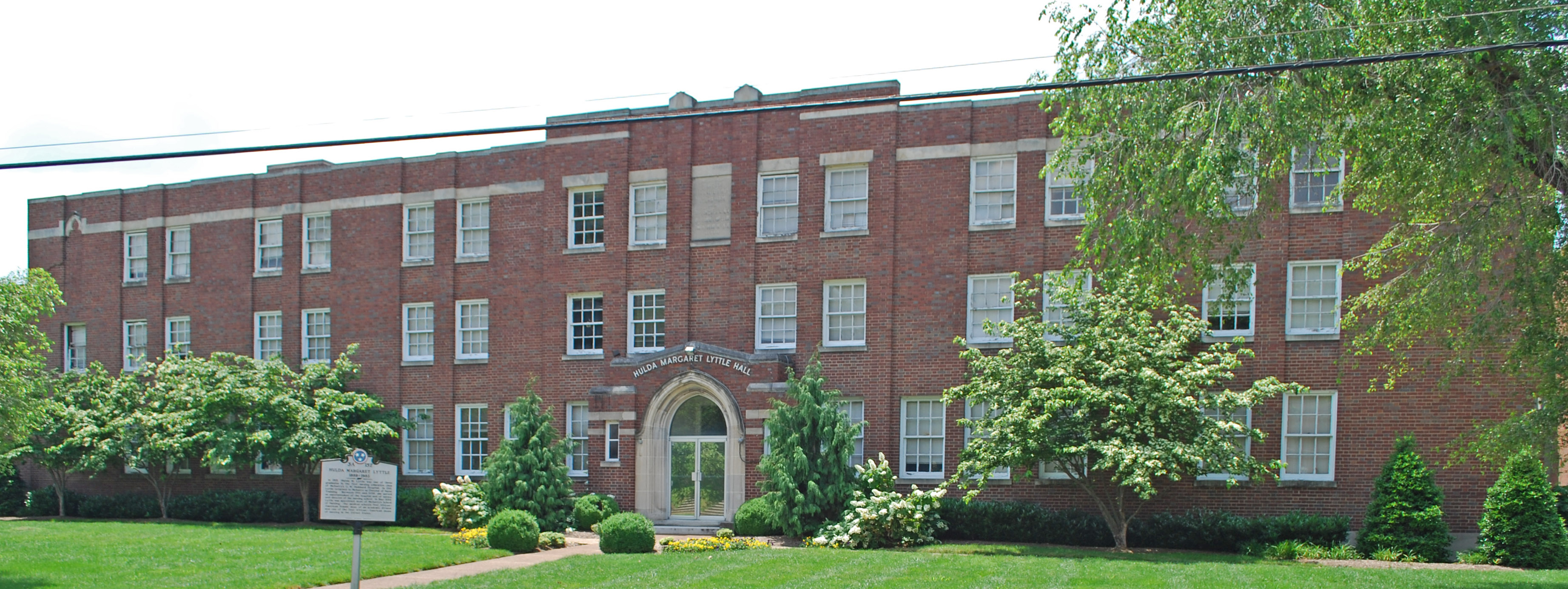

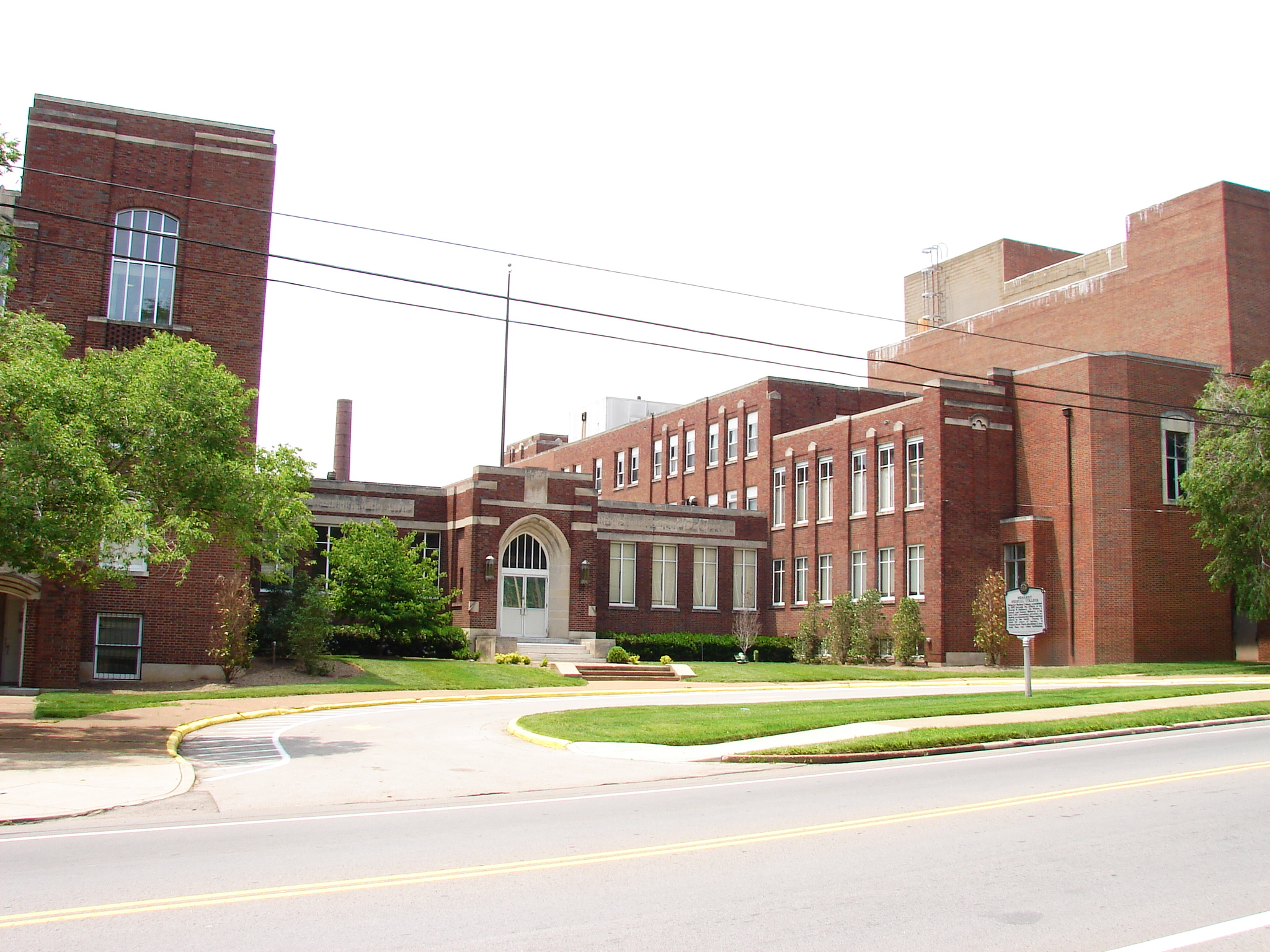

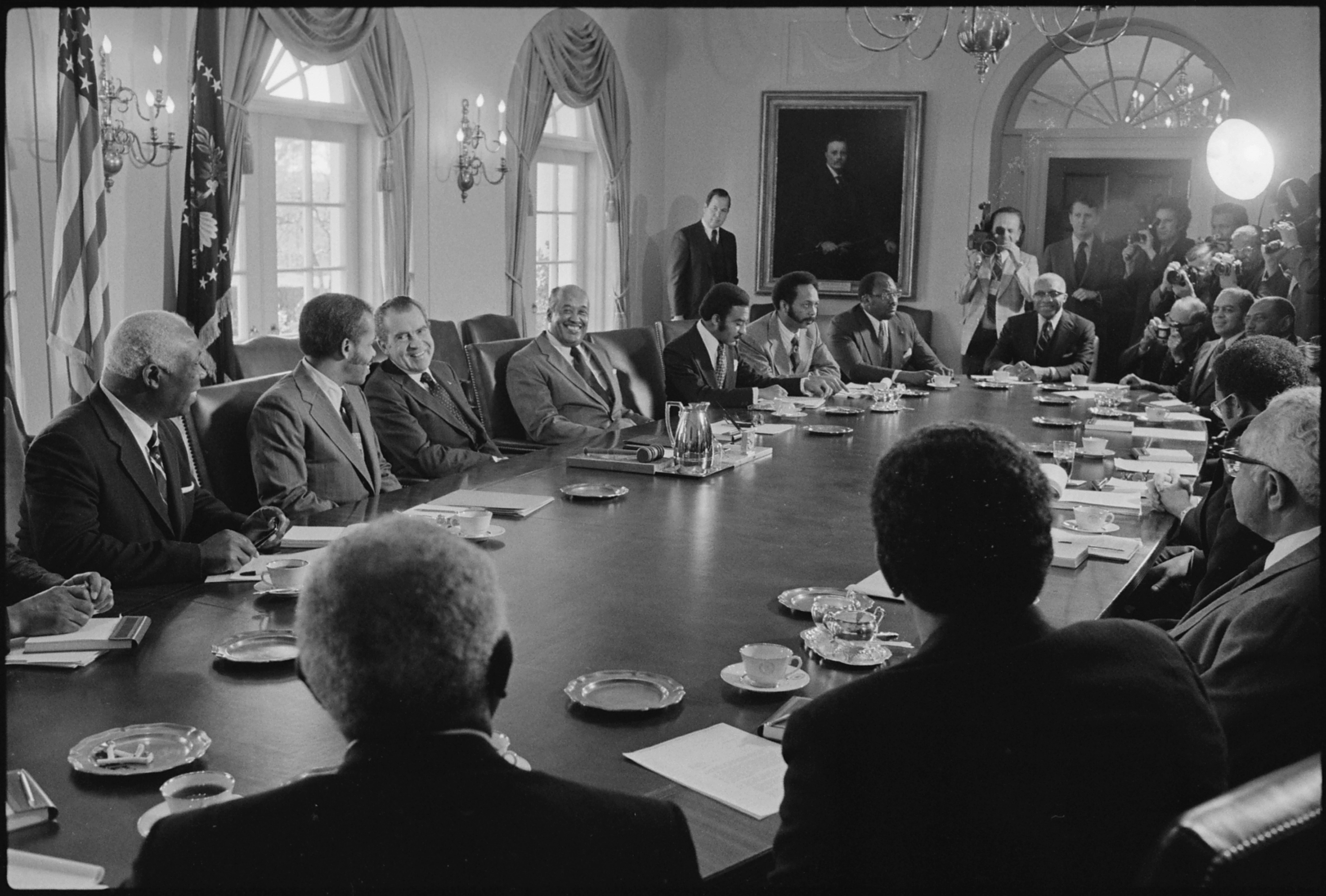

== Accreditation ==
Meharry Medical College School of Dentistry is currently accredited by ADA

== See also ==
- American Student Dental Association
