= Roy A. Burrell =

American politician

Member of the Louisiana House of Representatives from the 2nd district
- In office 2004–2016
- Preceded by: Lydia P. Jackson
- Succeeded by: Samuel Jenkins Jr.

Personal details
- Born: Roy Allen Burrell
- Party: Democratic

Roy Allen Burrell is an American politician. He served as a Democratic member for the 2nd district of the Louisiana House of Representatives.

In 2004, Burrell was elected for the 2nd district of the Louisiana House of Representatives, succeeding Lydia P. Jackson. He served until 2016, when he was succeeded by Samuel Jenkins Jr.
