= C. O. Simpkins =

State legislator in Louisiana (1925–2019)

Member of the Louisiana House of Representatives
- In office 1992–1996

Personal details
- Born: Cuthbert Ormond Simpkins; January 13, 1925 Mansfield, Louisiana, U.S.
- Died: December 4, 2019 (aged 94)
- Party: Democratic
- Spouse: Elaine Shoemaker
- Parent: Oscar Simpkins (father)
- Education: Wiley College; Tennessee State University; Meharry Medical College School of Dentistry
- Profession: Politician, dentist, civil rights campaigner

Military service
- Allegiance: United States
- Branch/service: United States Air Force

Cuthbert Ormond Simpkins Sr. (January 13, 1925 – December 4, 2019) was an American dentist, civil rights campaigner, and state legislator in Louisiana. He left the state under threat of violence before returning.

He was born in Mansfield, Louisiana to Oscar Simpkins. He studied at Wiley College and graduated from Tennessee State University with an undergraduate degree. He received a Doctorate of Dental Surgery from Meharry Medical College School of Dentistry in Nashville, Tennessee.

He served in the U.S. Air Force. He was a founding member of the Southern Christian Leadership Conference, SCLC. He lived in Shreveport. His home and office were firebombed.

He lived in New York for 26 years before returning to Shreveport. A Democrat, he served in the Louisiana House of Representatives from 1992 to 1996. At the time of his death he was married to Elaine nee Shoemaker Simpkins. Mansfield's post office was renamed for him.
