= Steven Jackson (politician) =

American politician

Member of the Louisiana House of Representatives from the 2nd district
- Incumbent
- Assumed office January 8, 2024
- Preceded by: Sam Jenkins

Personal details
- Party: Democratic
- Education: Grambling State University Louisiana State University Shreveport
- Committees: Health and Welfare Municipal, Parochial and Cultural Affairs Transportation, Highways and Public Works

Steven Jackson is an American politician. He represents the 2nd district of the Louisiana House of Representatives.

== Life and career ==
Jackson was a member of the Caddo Parish Commission before being elected to the state legislature.

While serving on the Parish Commission Jackson authored several pieces of legislation focused on community development and revitalization. Jackson spearheaded efforts to create Caddo Parish's first Housing Trust Fund to address affordable housing issues in Caddo Parish.

He was credited with securing over $50 million from the Louisiana Housing Corporation to support new construction and rehabilitation of several housing development in Caddo Parish.

In 2023, Jackson accepted a plea deal from Bossier Parish's District Attorney to avoid a lengthy trial during a campaign.

In 2023, Jackson defeated Terence Vinson in the nonpartisan primary election for the 2nd district of the Louisiana House of Representatives, winning 51 percent of the votes. He assumed office in 2024.

During the 2024 regular legislative session, Jackson authored legislation to create the Grambling State University World Famed Tiger Marching Band Prestige License Plate. He also authored legislation that will create the I-20 Economic Development District in Shreveport to encourage economic development along the I-20 corridor in Shreveport. During the session, Jackson also authored legislation that will rename Highway 133 after the late Louisiana Congressman Luke Letlow.

Jackson was one of two Democrats in the Louisiana House of Representatives to vote for final passage of Republican Josh Carlson's House Bill 974, which removed the requirement that public library directors in the state hold a Master of Library and Information Science degree. The bill passed the House 65–38.

== Electoral history ==
2023 Louisiana House of Representatives District 2 election
Primary election
Party	Candidate	Votes	%
Democratic	Steven Jackson	2,666	51.55
Democratic	Terence Vinson	2,506	48.45
Total votes		5,172	100

Louisiana House of Representatives
Preceded by Sam Jenkins	Member of the Louisiana House of Representatives from the 2nd district 2024-	Incumbent
