= Politics of Shreveport =

Politics of the Louisiana city

Founded in 1836 and incorporated in 1871, Shreveport is the third largest city in Louisiana. The city is the parish seat of Caddo Parish. A portion of east Shreveport extends in to Bossier Parish because of the changing course of the Red River.

The city of Shreveport has a mayor-council government. The City's elected officials are: the mayor, and members of the city council.

Under the mayor-council government, the mayor serves as the executive officer of the city. As the city's chief administrator and official representative, the mayor is responsible for the general management of the city and for seeing that all laws and ordinances are enforced.

Current mayor: Tom Arceneaux (R)

The Shreveport City Council partisan makeup

District A: Tabatha Taylor (D)
District B: Gary Brooks (D)
District C: Jim Taliaferro (R)
District D: Grayson Boucher (R)
District E: Alan Jackson Jr. (D)
District F: James Green (D)
District G: Ursula Bowman (D)

== Recent election results ==
Shreveport is something of an anomaly in Northwestern Louisiana, being the only city to vote reliably Democratic, along with its parish, Caddo Parish. Democrats have won the city since 1992. In statewide contests, the city and county lean more conservative with Republican's doing better in the city than their national counterparts despite still losing the city, the lone exceptions to this being the election of Kathleen Blanco in 2003 and John Bell Edwards in both his 2015 and 2019 bids. For the 2019 Attorney General's race, Republican's narrowly carried the city 50.9% to 49.1% despite John Bell Edwards sweeping the city 62.4% to 37%

United States presidential election results for Shreveport, Louisiana
Year	Republican		Democratic		Third party(ies)	
Year	No.	%	No.	%	No.	%
2016	30,348	38.00%	46,772	58.56%	2,750	3.44%
2020	28,901	36.82%	48,119	61.31%	1,466	1.87%

City of Shreveport vote by party in Class II Senate elections
Year	Democratic	Republican	Other
2020	57.2% 43,612	39.6 30,199	3.2% 2,426

City of Shreveport vote by party in Class III Senate elections
Year	Democratic	Republican	Other
2016	56.1% 42,490	41.7 31,553	2.2% 1,661

City of Shreveport vote by party in gubernatorial elections
Year	Democratic	Republican	Other
2019	62.4% 28,106	37 16,668	0.6% 290

City of Shreveport vote by party in attorney general elections
Year	Democratic	Republican	Other
2019	49.1 21,099	50.9 21,832	0.0% 0
