= Gregory Tarver =

American politician

Member of the Louisiana Senate from the 39th district
- In office January 9, 2012 – January 8, 2024
- Preceded by: Lydia P. Jackson
- Succeeded by: Sam Jenkins
- In office March 12, 1984 – January 12, 2004
- Preceded by: William Keith
- Succeeded by: Lydia P. Jackson

Personal details
- Born: March 30, 1946 (age 80) Shreveport, Louisiana, U.S.
- Party: Democratic

Gregory Williams Tarver Sr. (born March 30, 1946) is an American politician from the state of Louisiana. A member of the Democratic Party, he served as a member of the Louisiana Senate from the 39th district from 1984–2004 and 2012 to 2024. He lives in Shreveport.
