= Foreign Pollution Fee Act =

Proposed US eco-tariff legislation

Foreign Pollution Fee Act of 2025
- Long title: To amend the Internal Revenue Code of 1986 to impose a fee on certain products imported into the United States based on the pollution intensity associated with the production of such products, and for other purposes.

Legislative history
- Introduced in the United States Senate as S. 1325 by Bill Cassidy R‑LA, Lindsey Graham R‑SC on April 8, 2025; Committee consideration by United States Senate Committee on Finance

The Foreign Pollution Fee Act is a bill in the United States Senate that proposes to impose a tariff on industrial imports according to the relative emissions caused by their manufacture, or, in other words, the relative "dirtiness" of the particular industry in that country.

== History ==
The Act was introduced by Senators Bill Cassidy (R‑LA) and Lindsey Graham (R‑SC) in November 2023. The bipartisan PROVE IT Act, another bill aimed toward a pollution tariff, was also introduced in that Congress, though it would only study the carbon intensity of American products.

The Act was reintroduced on April 8, 2025 by the same senators. This came soon after President Donald Trump mentioned, during his Liberation Day tariff announcements, the inequality of pollution regulations between the United States and China. Furthermore, on April 8 US Trade Representative Jamieson Greer specifically remarked that "trade action can be appropriate" to address pollution by other countries.

The reintroduced Act came at a time likely chosen for a chance at inclusion in the budget reconciliation bill or as an amendment to it, possibly being attractive as a revenue generator for Republicans seeking to manage the budget, but was not included in the One Big Beautiful Bill Act.

== Motivation and effects ==
Cassidy and Graham hope to help US businesses and make international competition more fair by penalizing loose environmental regulations in some countries. US industries generally are less polluting due to stricter American environmental laws. Chinese steel was estimated in 2025 to cause twice the carbon emissions, though Chinese heavy industries are becoming cleaner with time. Specific exporters of interest include China and Russia. Industry groups support the Act for its protection of domestic manufacturers from international (such as Chinese) competitors.

Climate advocates support the bill to reduce emissions. Senator Sheldon Whitehouse (D‑RI), leader of the Democratic effort toward a carbon tariff, told Axios reporters he hoped to collaborate with Cassidy on a bipartisan bill.

The Act also appeals to China hawks such as Lindsey Graham, a co-sponsor. Cassidy described the bill as addressing a "nexus between climate, national security, economic security and energy policy." He highlighted that it would encourage trade with like-minded countries, improving a trade network that could oppose what he described as the predatory trade practices of China, a "non-market economy".

Supporters also see it as a way to create a tariff policy more durable than Trump's tariffs, which he at times paused and could always be removed by a succeeding president's executive orders.

=== Trump ===
The Act's 2025 reintroduction came in the context of tariffs in the second Trump administration and the European Union's Carbon Border Adjustment Mechanism, which is scheduled to fully enter effect in 2026. The bill is notable as a Republican pollution tariff. Given Republicans' historical opposition to most climate change legislation, environmentalists consider such tariffs as an avenue for hope during the Trump administration. Though Trump had not expressed particular support as of early 2025, Robert Lighthizer, US Trade Representative in Trump's term, had previously seen internationally unequal environmental laws as unfair for trade, with carbon tariffs as the solution. Additionally, the Trump-aligned America First Policy Institute supported the 2025 reintroduction. Unfortunately, given the freeze in Inflation Reduction Act funding for pollution reduction in heavy industry, such as grants for replacing steelmakers' coal-fired blast furnaces with electric furnaces, it is expected that United States businesses' carbon advantage may be eroded by other countries continued decarbonization efforts; other countries are expected to catch up.

=== Beneficiaries ===
Cassidy and Graham both represent states with large industries that would benefit from a tariff on foreign competitors.

The Act, in its 2025 form, would benefit companies selling carbon credits for tree planting, ocean fertilization or alkalinity enhancement, or direct air capture.

== Reception ==
The Sierra Club is in favor of policies such as pollution fees. They and the Center for Strategic and International Studies (CSIS) however note that the bill does not explicitly incentivize American businesses to reduce their pollution, allowing dirtier US companies to freeride on others that have invested and innovated in greener processes. (The Act calculates tariffs using averages across each industry in each country.) The Sierra Club also criticized the bill for not differentiating between cleaner and dirtier overseas producers of each good, with the CSIS adding that overseas companies would be disincentivized from good behavior by needing to pay for both renewable energy and carbon fees, though the act includes a way for some foreign facilities to apply for facility-specific evaluation. The Sierra Club also warns it would be possible for companies to evade the fee by trading in derived goods not covered by the Act, such as vehicles and electrical transformers. The Club stated that the Act could ensure that larger polluters overseas could not undercut US industries but sent "mixed signals" to domestic and international actors; the club called for incentives tying US and foreign companies' individual competitiveness to environmental performance and for a requirement for foreign manufacturers to comply with US air and water protections.

The CSIS supported the bill in 2023, noting that it breaks from the Republican reluctance to address climate change, possibly heralding more bipartisan environmental legislation, and encourages establishment of "international partnerships" for clean trade. The CSIS has some warnings: it could violate World Trade Organization rules against discrimination between domestic and imported goods. It also notes that a provision giving US manufacturers the ability to petition for additional products to be covered gives them protectionist power. The CSIS however notes that the bill allows countries to negotiate "international partnership agreements" to remove the fees if those countries have rules about emissions intensity and their own trade policies analogous to the Act, thereby encouraging international alliances and further isolating "bad actors" to advance US geostrategic interests, especially against China's increasing economic power.

== Provisions ==
The Act, in its 2023 version, would have targeted iron and steel, cement, aluminum, glass, fertilizer, and hydrogen, imposing a baseline 15% tariff on all such imports, higher for those goods more carbon-intensive than their United States equivalents.

The Act, in its 2025 version, would levy tariffs on iron, steel, aluminum, cement, glass, fertilizer, hydrogen, and solar components according to the average of how much pollution is emitted by each good's production in the exporting country relative to the United States. In other words, it would tax imports with a higher carbon footprint than American goods. The 2025 version removed oil and gas from the list of affected goods. It would allow companies to pay less tariffs by buying carbon credits. Democrats have argued that the Act does not comply with World Trade Organization rules because it does not include a domestic emissions fine. Cassidy noted however that he was "willing to accept the political reality" that a domestic carbon price could not pass a Republican-controlled Congress.

== See also ==
- EU Carbon Border Adjustment Mechanism
- S. 3422 Clean Competition Act (of 2023)
- H.R. 4534 FAIR Transition and Competition Act (of 2021)
