= United Kingdom–European Union relations =

European Union–United Kingdom relations

- European Union: United Kingdom

Diplomatic mission
- European Union Delegation, London: United Kingdom Mission, Brussels

Envoy
- Ambassador Pedro Serrano: Ambassador Caroline Wilson

The United Kingdom is not currently a member state of the European Union; however, it was from 1973 to 2020. Relations between the European Union (EU) and the United Kingdom of Great Britain and Northern Ireland (UK) are governed, since 1 January 2021, by the EU–UK Trade and Cooperation Agreement (TCA).

Relations trace back to the foundation of the European Communities, the European Union's predecessor, in 1958. The UK was a member state of the bloc after joining it in 1973 (which was confirmed in a referendum on membership in 1975) until it became the first country to voluntarily end its membership on 31 January 2020 following a second referendum on membership held in 2016, which resulted in 51.9% of voters opting to leave.

The Brexit withdrawal agreement now plays a significant role in relations between the two polities. The United Kingdom shares a land border with the Republic of Ireland, an EU member state, via Northern Ireland, which has remained a de facto member of the European single market and maintained the authority of the European Court of Justice under the Northern Ireland Protocol. Relations between the UK and the EU have seen improvement since the proposal of the Windsor Framework.

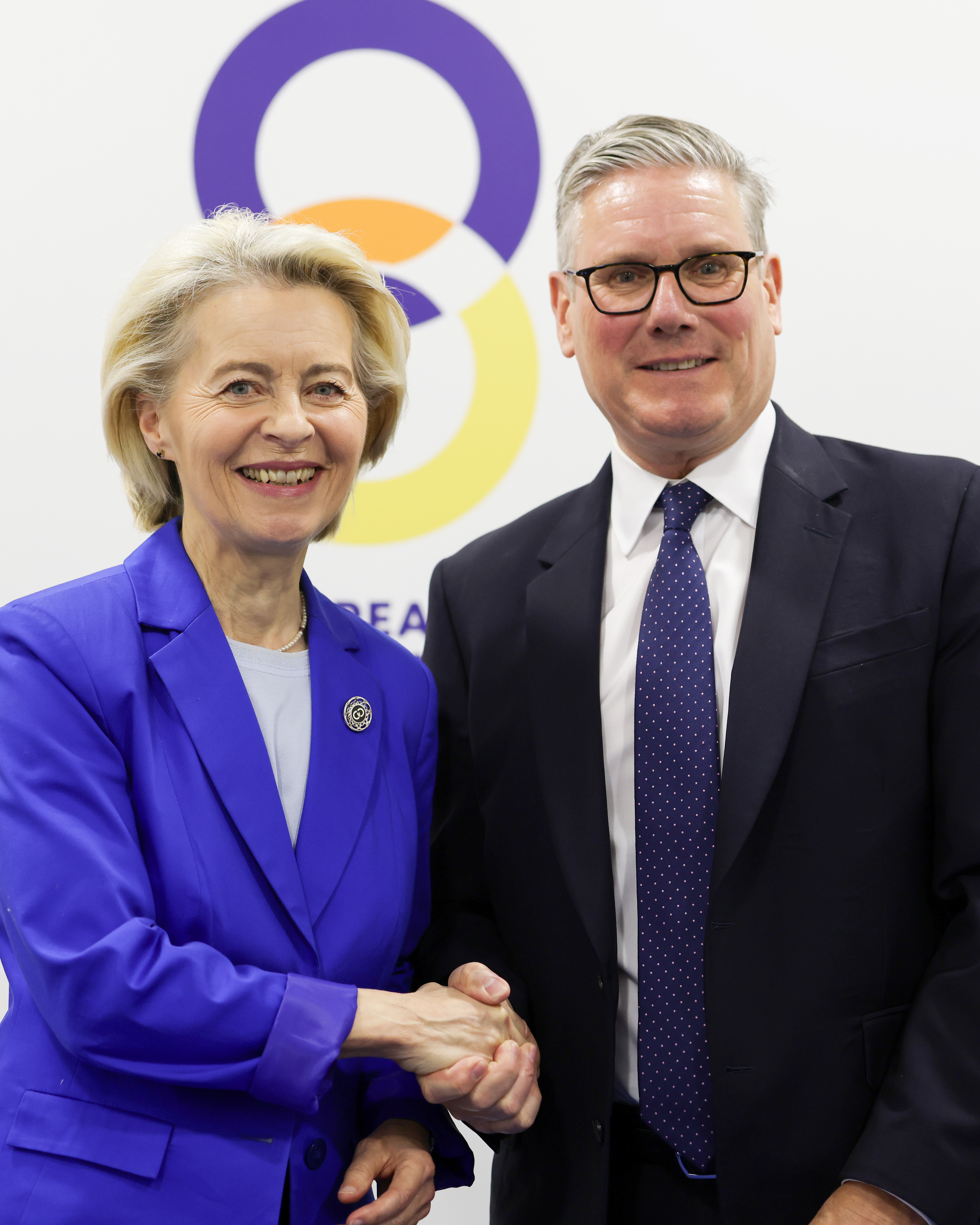
British Prime Minister Keir Starmer and European Commission President Ursula von der Leyen

== History ==
=== Precedents ===
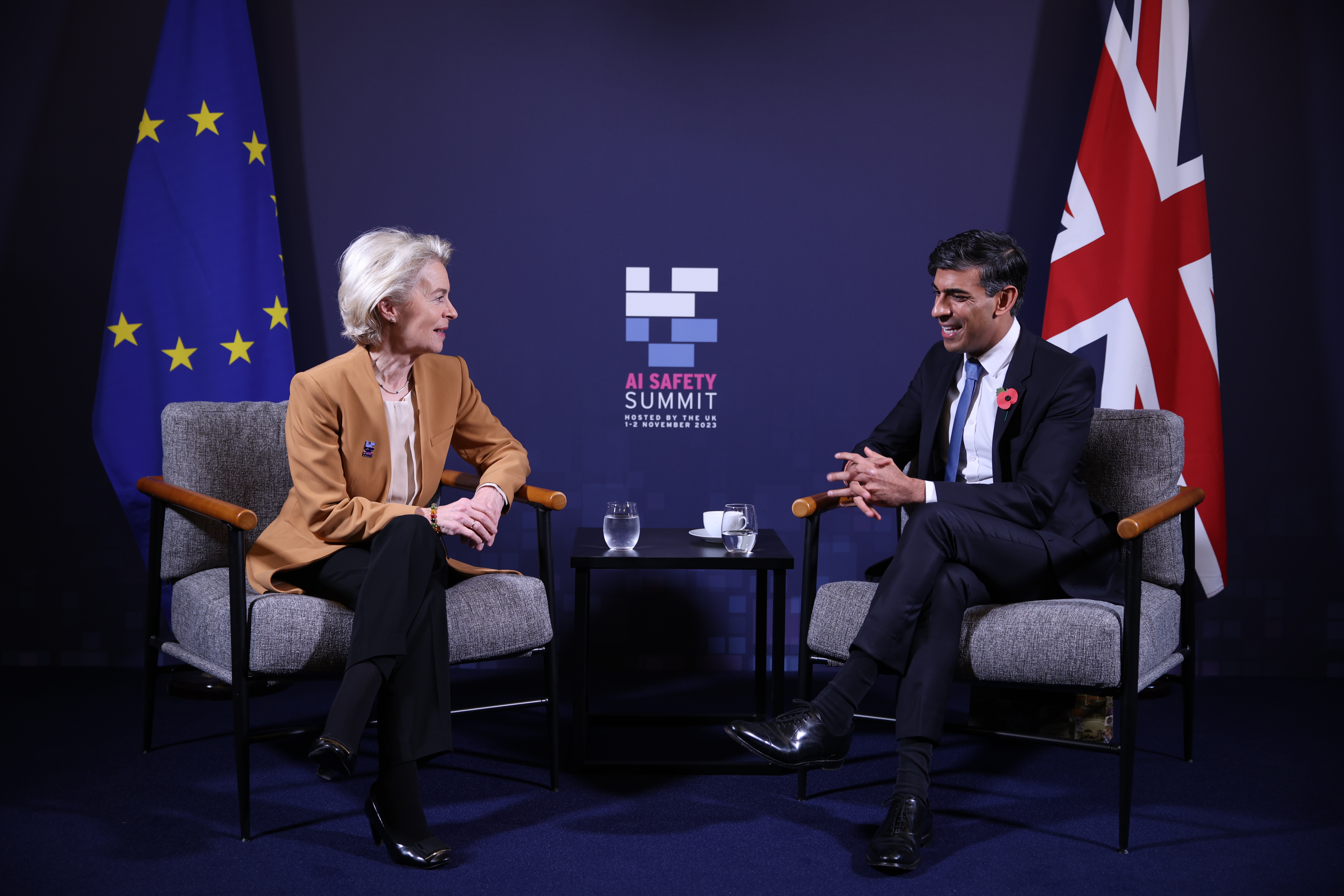
President of the European Commission Ursula von der Leyen with British Prime Minister Rishi Sunak with in the 2023 AI Safety Summit in Bletchley Park, 2 November 2023

The UK failed to take part in the diplomatic discussions that led up to the creation of the European Coal and Steel Community (ECSC), likewise later withdrawing from negotiations for the constitution of the European Economic Community (EEC).

The United Kingdom's failed applications to join the European Communities (EC) in 1963 and 1967 were vetoed by the president of France, Charles de Gaulle, who said that "a number of aspects of Britain's economy, from working practices to agriculture" had "made Britain incompatible with Europe" and that Britain harboured a "deep-seated hostility" to any pan-European project. Once de Gaulle had relinquished the French presidency in 1969, the UK made a third and successful application for membership.

=== UK membership in the bloc (1973–2020) ===
Following the UK accession to the EC in 1973, the former got to renegotiate membership terms, vied for budgetary rebates and requested opt-outs from the single currency and other common policies. The protectionist Common Agricultural Policy (CAP) in particular was often at the center of the UK conflicts with the rest of the EC, underpinning its reputation as an "awkward partner" within the bloc.

Since 1977, both pro- and anti-European views have had majority support at different times, with some dramatic swings between the two camps. Conservative and Labour parties alike usually pandered to the prejudices towards the EC espoused by the Britons, who rather than commit to a European idea, generally preferred to hanker for the bygone days of British world hegemony. In the United Kingdom European Communities membership referendum of 1975, two-thirds of British voters favoured continued EC membership. The highest-ever rejection of membership was in 1980, the first full year of Prime Minister Margaret Thatcher's term of office, with 65% opposed to and 26% in favour of membership. As a member of the EU, the United Kingdom never adopted the use of the euro or joined the Schengen Area, which, bringing down border controls in a number of countries, thereby allowed for free movement of citizens. Likewise, the UK government adhered to a long-standing policy of enthusiasm for EU enlargement, under the premise that the addition of more members would undermine any federalising drive (deepening) of the union.

Vis-à-vis Gibraltar, a British Overseas Territory whose defence and foreign policies are handled by His Majesty's Government, the Spain's accession to the European Communities in 1986, negotiated with the UK inside the bloc from a position of strength, made the former country to renounce its power, recognised by the Treaty of Utrecht, to close its land border with Gibraltar at its discretion. The then Conservative UK government acquiesced to the 1992 Maastricht Treaty (by which the European Union came into existence) as it aligned with its vision of the bloc as essentially a free market.

The 1998 Good Friday Agreement pertaining the end of the ethnonationalist conflict in Northern Ireland was signed under the context of the shared membership of the UK and Ireland in the EU.

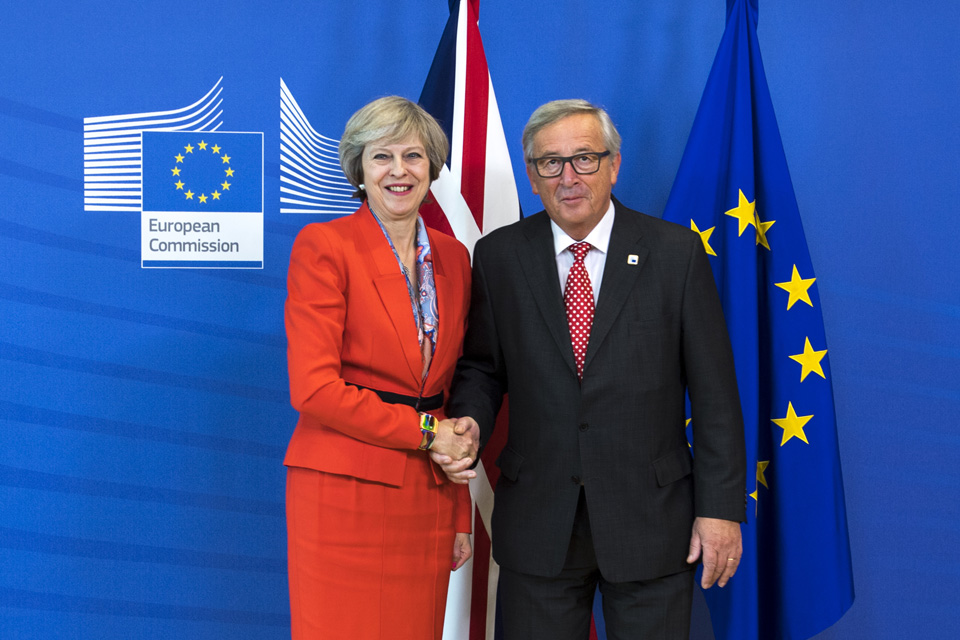
UK Prime Minister Theresa May meets with President of the European Commission Jean-Claude Juncker with in Brussels, Belgium, 21 October 2016.

Following the result of the 2016 United Kingdom European Union membership referendum, when 52 percent of those who voted supported 'Brexit' (a blend of "British exit"), the UK negotiated its withdrawal from the European Union. After the vote, British Prime Minister David Cameron, who supported staying in the EU, resigned. Theresa May became the prime minister after his formal resignation. Although she also supported remaining in the EU, she committed to negotiating Britain's exit. The United Kingdom formally left the bloc on 31 January 2020.

=== Post-Brexit relations (since 2020) ===
On 30 December 2020, after eight months of negotiations, the EU and the UK signed the EU–UK Trade and Cooperation Agreement, which governs bilateral relations since its provisional entry into force two days later and which was later ratified by both parties. UK government attempts to unilaterally reject the terms of the agreed Northern Ireland Protocol have exacerbated post-Brexit relations.

Although the United Kingdom has maintained strong relations with some EU member states, the decision to withdraw and subsequent turbulent process of negotiating the Trade and Cooperation Agreement sparked criticism of the United Kingdom across the EU. However, UK-EU collaborative discussions on the response to the 2022 Russian invasion of Ukraine, which saw the UK invited to an EU Foreign Affairs Council meeting for the first time since Brexit, and the successful negotiation of the Windsor Framework for Northern Ireland between the UK and EU, has indicated a gradual improvement of relations over time.

On 28 June 2023, the EU and UK signed a memorandum of understanding to enhance cooperation on financial services. Chancellor Jeremy Hunt described the signing as a significant moment, highlighting the interconnections of the EU and UK financial markets. The agreement establishes a forum for regular discussions on voluntary regulatory cooperation. However, it does not indicate regulatory alignment or address specific demands from the EU.

Of the 1,218,000 immigrants who came to the United Kingdom in 2023, only 126,000 were citizens of EU member states. BBC reported that "In the 12 months to June 2023, net EU migration was -86,000, meaning more EU nationals left the UK than arrived". EU citizens working in the health and social care sector have been replaced by migrants from non-EU countries such as India and Nigeria. After Brexit, the number of EU nationals who were refused entry to the UK increased fivefold.

==== EU–UK 'Reset' (2024–) ====
In its election manifesto for the 2024 general election, the Labour Party led by Keir Starmer pledged to "reset" UK-EU relations and "make Brexit work".

On 2 October 2024, during talks in Brussels, Starmer and Ursula von der Leyen emphasized their commitment to enhancing cooperation on issues such as economic growth, energy, security, and migration. They reaffirmed their dedication to the Withdrawal Agreement and international law, despite pressure from hard-line Brexiteers regarding the European Convention on Human Rights. They planned to define areas for strengthened cooperation in the coming months and committed to regular meetings, starting with a summit early in 2025.

In March 2025, the Trades Union Congress called for a closer relationship with the EU, in order to reduce trade barriers and border checks and bring closer alignment of chemical and food standards. General secretary Paul Nowak called for a "commonsense trade deal" and a new approach which respects the referendum result.

The first formal summit since Brexit took place in May 2025 in London and concluded fresh agreements on defense cooperation and easing trade flows. The TUC welcomed the government's trade reset as "an important first step" and "just the beginning" of improved links.

In Autumn 2025, the EU and UK disagreed over participation in the EU's Security Action for Europe (SAFE) joint defence procurement programme for defence, which resulted in the UK opting not to participate in the scheme. The EU asked the UK to pay between €4.5-6.5 billion for participation in the scheme, whereas the UK offered to pay between €200-300 million. Under SAFE provisions, no more than 35% of parts could be procured from non-EU, EEA, or EFTA states (except Ukraine).

On 9 December 2025, Liberal Democrat MP Al Pinkerton introduced a bill to the House of Commons calling for the UK government to negotiate a UK-EU Customs Union. Health Secretary Wes Streeting and Deputy Prime Minister and Justice Secretary David Lammy have also spoken positively on the creation of a UK-EU Customs Union.

On 17 December 2025, in a joint statement by Maroš Šefčovič and Nick Thomas-Symonds, the UK's participation in the Erasmus+ programme from 2027 was confirmed, as well as the announcement of negotiations on the participation of the UK in the EU's internal electricity market. This is alongside a commitment to the implementation of a UK-EU Youth Experience Scheme, establishing a common Sanitary and Phytosanitary (SPS) area and on linking the UK and EU Emissions Trading Systems.

In an interview on the BBC's Sunday with Laura Kuenssburg on 4 January 2026, Keir Starmer indicated that the UK should align with the EU Single Market "on an issue-by-issue, sector-by-sector basis" where this was in the UK's national interest.

== Post-Brexit polling ==
Following the UK's withdrawal from the EU, polling companies have continued to poll respondents on re-joining the EU.

=== National polling ===
Respondents are regularly polled on their voting intention in a hypothetical referendum on re-joining the EU. This is instead of re-using the leave or remain question from the 2016 referendum.

Recent polling results have demonstrated a clear lead for "re-join" over "stay[ing] out". A longer example of the following table can be found here.

Dates conducted	Pollster	Client	Sample size	Rejoin	Stay out	Neither	Lead
26–27 Nov 2025	BMG Research	The i	1,548	43%	39%	17%	4%
17–18 Nov 2025	YouGov	N/A	2,138	50%	30%	20%	20%
15–16 Oct 2025	YouGov	Eurotrack	2,167	50%	31%	20%	19%
16–17 Sep 2025	YouGov	Eurotrack	2,245	49%	30%	20%	19%
26–28 Aug 2025	BMG Research	The i	1,504	43%	38%	19%	5%

=== In the European Union ===
In 2021, Euronews commissioned British pollsters Redfield & Wilton Strategies to conduct a poll in France, Germany, Spain, and Italy on how respondents would feel about the UK re-joining the EU. Support out-weighed opposition across all four countries, with it being lowest in France (36%) and highest in Spain (46%).

== Trade ==
In 2017, exports to the European Union amounted to £274 billion out of £616 billion in total exports for the UK. The proportion of UK export to the European Union has been noted to be in decline, since exports to non-EU countries have increased at a faster rate.

On the European side, according to Eurostat, exports from the EU 27 to the UK have increased from 316 euro billions in 2015 to 319 euro billions in 2019. In the same time, according to Eurostat, imports from the UK to the EU-27 have increased from 184 euro billions in 2015 to 194 euro billions in 2019.

== United Kingdom's foreign relations with EU member states (EU27) ==
Country	British embassy	Reciprocal embassy	Notes
Austria	Vienna	London	British Mission to OSCE and UN Office in Vienna Main article: Austria–United Kingdom relations
Belgium	Brussels	London	British Mission to EU and NATO in Brussels Main article: Belgium–United Kingdom relations
Bulgaria	Sofia	London	Main article: Bulgaria–United Kingdom relations
Croatia	Zagreb; Consulate General: Split	London	Main article: Croatia–United Kingdom relations
Cyprus	High Commission: Nicosia	High Commission: London	Main article: Cyprus–United Kingdom relations
Czech Republic	Prague	London; Consulate General: Manchester	Main article: Czech Republic–United Kingdom relations
Denmark	Copenhagen	London	Main article: Denmark–United Kingdom relations
Estonia	Tallinn	London	Main article: Estonia–United Kingdom relations
Finland	Helsinki	London	Main article: Finland–United Kingdom relations
France	Paris; Consulates General: Bordeaux, Lyon, Marseille	London; Consulate General: Edinburgh	British Mission to OECD and UNESCO in Paris and in Council of Europe in Strasbourg Main article: France–United Kingdom relations
Germany	Berlin; Consulates General: Düsseldorf, Munich	London; Consulate General: Edinburgh	Main article: Germany–United Kingdom relations
Greece	Athens; Consulates General: Heraklion, Thessaloniki	London	Main article: Greece–United Kingdom relations
Hungary	Budapest	London; Consulate General: Manchester, Edinburgh	Main article: Hungary–United Kingdom relations
Ireland	Dublin	London; Consulates General: Cardiff, Edinburgh, Manchester	499 km of common border Main article: Ireland–United Kingdom relations
Italy	Rome; Consulates General: Milan, Naples	London; Consulate General: Edinburgh	Main article: Italy–United Kingdom relations
Latvia	Riga	London.	Main article: Latvia–United Kingdom relations
Lithuania	Vilnius	London	Main article: Lithuania–United Kingdom relations
Luxembourg	Luxembourg	London	Main article: Luxembourg–United Kingdom relations
Malta	High Commission: Valletta	High Commission: London	Main article: Malta–United Kingdom relations
Netherlands	The Hague; Consulate General: Amsterdam	London	British Mission to OPCW in The Hague Main article: Netherlands–United Kingdom relations
Poland	Warsaw	London; Consulates General: Belfast, Edinburgh, Manchester	Main article: Poland–United Kingdom relations
Portugal	Lisbon; Consulate General: Portimão	London; Consulate General: Manchester	Main article: Portugal–United Kingdom relations
Romania	Bucharest	London; Consulate General: Edinburgh, Manchester	Main article: Romania–United Kingdom relations
Slovakia	Bratislava	London	Main article: Slovakia–United Kingdom relations
Slovenia	Ljubljana	London	Main article: Slovenia–United Kingdom relations
Spain	Madrid; Consulates General: Barcelona, Alicante, Ibiza, Las Palmas, Málaga, Palma, Santa Cruz	London; Consulates General: Edinburgh, Manchester	Main article: Spain–United Kingdom relations
Sweden	Stockholm	London	Main article: Sweden–United Kingdom relations

== Summits ==
=== EU–UK Summits ===
Holding regular EU-UK summits was agreed at the 4th European Political Community Summit, at Blenheim Palace in July 2024.

European Union–United Kingdom Summits
#	Date	Country	City	Location	Host Leader	Ref	Image
1	19 May 2025	United Kingdom	London	Lancaster House	Prime Minister Keir Starmer		
2	20 November 2026	Belgium	Brussels	TBA	European Council President António Costa		

=== 2025 Summit ===
On 19 May 2025, Prime Minister Keir Starmer, European Commission President Ursula von der Leyen, and European Council President Antonio Costa met at Lancaster House in Central London. Starmer announced a new EU–UK deal, including a defence and security pact, a fisheries agreement, an agrifood agreement, carbon border taxes, and border security.

The EU and the UK agreed to a new Defence and Security pact which will allow UK arms manufacturers to bid for work under the EU's new £150 billion Security Action for Europe (SAFE) defence fund. Additionally, it pushes for deeper co-operation and information exchanges on space, cyber security and the tackling the Russian shadow fleet.

The EU and the UK agreed to roll over the existing fishing deal for another 12 years, until 2038, providing access to UK waters for EU fishing fleets.

Both sides agreed to merge the EU Carbon Border Adjustment Mechanism (CBAM) to the UK CBAM into a single net-zero emissions trading scheme. The decision exempts European and British sides from upcoming carbon taxes on each other.

The deal allows British passport holders to enter eGates after the implementation of the EU's Entry-Exit System, greatly reducing their border security waiting times. European eGates were previously reserved for people from the EU or European Economic Area, however the UK is no longer a member of either. The agreement has been extended to cover the Crown Dependencies of Guernsey and Jersey; thus Guernsey passports and Jersey passports can enter eGates. Pet passports are also covered resulting in UK travellers no longer needing health certificates from vets in both the UK and EU to travel with their owners to each other's territories.

The agreement enables the UK to rejoin the Erasmus+ student and youth experience scheme, subject to further negotiations. The UK's participation in Erasmus+ will commence in 2027.

The agreement will ease border checks on food, helping trade and possibly lowering prices. A special deal will protect British steel exports, saving £25 million a year. Overall, the deal could add nearly £9 billion to the UK economy by 2040.

=== 2026 Summit ===
On 16 June 2026 at the G7 summit in Évian-les-Bains Prime Minister Keir Starmer, European Commission President Ursula von der Leyen, and European Council President Antonio Costa, announced that a summit would take place in Brussels on 22 July. The summit was delayed by two months due to deadlock in negotiations relating to a new youth experience scheme. It was later announced that the summit might be postponed after Starmer said that he planned to resign as Prime Minister. In October 2026, it was announced that the summit would be held in Brussels on 20 November 2026.

== See also ==
- Cyprus dispute
- European Union–NATO relations
- Foreign relations of the European Union
- Foreign relations of the United Kingdom
- Gibraltar–Spain border
- Ireland–NATO relations
- Malta–NATO relations
- Opinion polling on the United Kingdom rejoining the European Union (2020–present)
- Opinion polling on the United Kingdom's membership of the European Union (2016–2020)
- Post-Brexit United Kingdom relations with the European Union
- Potential enlargement of the European Union
- Republic of Ireland–United Kingdom border
- United Kingdom membership of the European Union
