= Climate change in India =

Emissions, effects and responses of India related to climate change

Anthropogenic greenhouse gas emissions have contributed to changes in India's climate, including rising land temperatures, warming of the Indian Ocean, changes in precipitation and monsoon patterns, retreat of glaciers and changes in the Himalayan cryosphere, rising sea levels and increase in the frequency and intensity of certain extreme weather events like heatwaves, droughts, cyclones and heavy rainfall. These changes vary considerably across the country, with different regions experiencing distinct changes in climate.

India's average surface air temperature rose by around 0.89 °C during 2015–2024 relative to 1901–1930. The tropical Indian Ocean has warmed at 0.12 °C per decade since 1950. Mean southwest monsoon rainfall declined by 0.5–1.5 mm/day per decade in parts of the Indo-Gangetic Plain and northeast India during 1951–2024. North Indian Ocean sea level rose approximately 3.3 mm per year during 1993–2017.

These changes have implications for India's agriculture, water resources, ecosystems, public health and economy. India is also one of the world's largest annual greenhouse gas emitters, although its per-capita emissions remain below the global average. Coal-based electricity production, industry, transport and agriculture are among the principal sources of emissions. The country has undertaken measures to expand renewable energy, reduce the emissions intensity of its economy and adapt to climate-related risks. India has committed to achieving net-zero greenhouse gas emissions by 2070.

== Greenhouse gas emissions ==
India's emissions per person are lower than the other major emitters, but the national total is significant.

CO2 emissions in India are significantly lower than those of China, but they are rising rapidly.quickly percentagewise.

India generates much less carbon dioxide per person than other primary regions.

India emits about 3 gigatonnes (Gt) CO_{2eq} of greenhouse gases each year which makes up about 7% of total annual global emissions.

According to data from the Climate Change Tracker, India has contributed 169,898.56 megatonnes of carbon dioxide since 1851, accounting for 4.62% of the historic total. India's per capita emissions are rated "low", at 1.85 tonnes per capita per year. However, this reflects the country's large population which dilutes the per capita footprint despite high overall emissions. Furthermore, India's energy use per capita increased by 11% from 2014 to 2019.

The Paris Agreement commitments included a reduction of this intensity by 33–35% by 2030.

The Indian national carbon trading scheme may be created in 2026.

=== Electricity generation ===
As of September 2021 India generates 39.8% of its electricity from renewable energy sources and 60.2% of its electricity from fossil fuels of which 51% is generated from coal.

=== Industry ===
The industrial sector, including the production of cement, iron, and steel, is a major contributor to global emissions, accounting for about a quarter of the total. From 2000 to 2014, fuel consumption in this sector surged by 406%, reflecting its rapid expansion and escalating energy demand. By 2014, the industry was also responsible for 42% of total energy consumption, highlighting the significant environmental effects associated with industrial activities.

Industry-related emissions make up half of India's carbon emissions and are increasing. India, the world's second-largest steel producer, accounts for 7% of global crude steel production. With rising domestic demand, emissions from this sector could significantly increase. Implementing standards for low and near-zero emissions steel is crucial to mitigate this risk. These standards facilitate essential policies and mechanisms such as procurement, financing, carbon pricing, and emissions trading systems, which are key in supporting India's transition to net-zero emissions and reducing the environmental footprint of its industrial sector.

=== Agriculture ===
Agricultural emissions increased 25% between 2005 and 2014, in part due to significant increases in the use of artificial fertilisers and the burning of crops. The largest source of agricultural emissions in India is due to enteric fermentation, followed by the use of artificial fertilisers, manure, and rice cultivation.

=== Waste ===
Waste emitted 78 Mt of CO_{2eq} in 2014.

=== Emissions disparities ===
While India as a whole is a major greenhouse gas producer, there are disparities in per capita emissions. A citizen in the top 1% produces four-and-a-half times more carbon dioxide than a citizen in the poorest 38% of the population.

== Effects on the natural environment ==
=== Temperature and weather changes ===
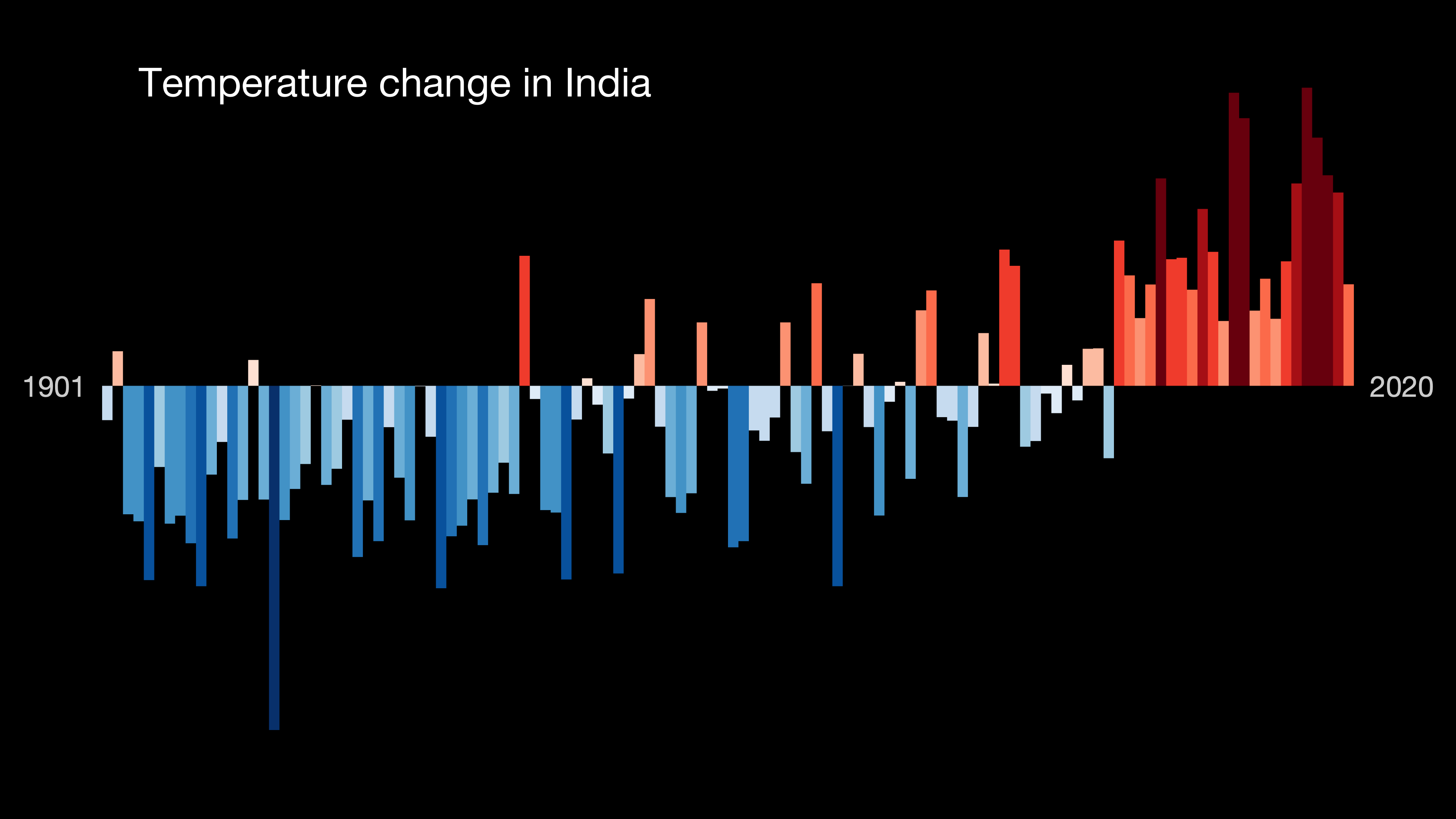
Visualisation of temperature change in India, 1901 to 2020.

Köppen climate classification map for India for 1980–2016

2071–2100 map under the most intense climate change scenario. Mid-range scenarios are currently considered more likely

Temperatures in India have risen by 0.7 °C (1.3 °F) between 1901 and 2018, thereby changing the climate in India.

In May 2022 a severe heatwave was recorded in Pakistan and India. The temperature reached 51 °C. Climate change makes such heatwaves 100 times more likely. Without climate change, heatwaves more severe than those which occurred in 2010 are expected to arrive 1 time in 312 years. Now they are expected to occur every 3 years.

A 2018 study projects droughts to increase in Northern and North-western India in the near future. Around the end of the century, most parts of India will likely face more and more severe droughts.

Temperature rises on the Tibetan Plateau are causing Himalayan glaciers to retreat, threatening the flow rate of the Ganges, Brahmaputra, Yamuna and other major rivers.

Severe landslides and floods are projected to become increasingly common in such states as Assam.

=== Sea level rise ===
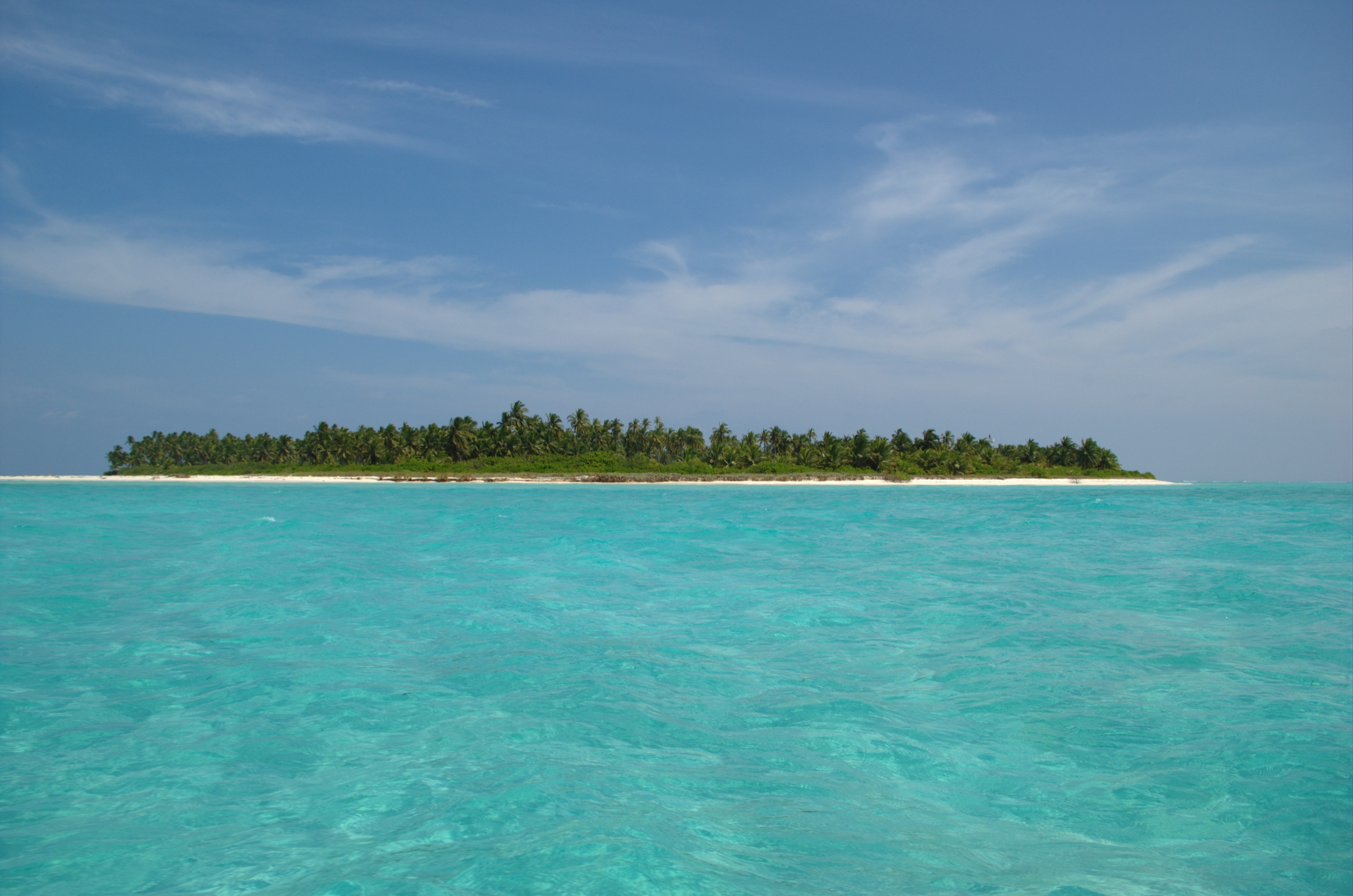
The tiny low-lying islands of Lakshadweep may be inundated by sea level rises associated with climate change.

Meghalaya and other northeastern states are concerned that rising sea levels will submerge much of Bangladesh and spawn a refugee crisis.

Between 1990 and 2016, India lost 235 square kilometres (91 sq mi) of land to coastal erosion. As a result of flooding, 3.6 million Indians were displaced between 2008 and 2018, according to the Internal Displacement Monitoring Centre.

Thousands of people have been displaced by ongoing sea level rises that have submerged low-lying islands in the Sundarbans.

Civil engineer Rabin Chakrabortty and their peers conducted a 2025 study that found that the cities of Mumbai and Kolkata face the highest flood risks, and a 2023 study suggested that several million Indians will face threats from flooded waters due to rising sea levels by 2050.

=== Water resources ===
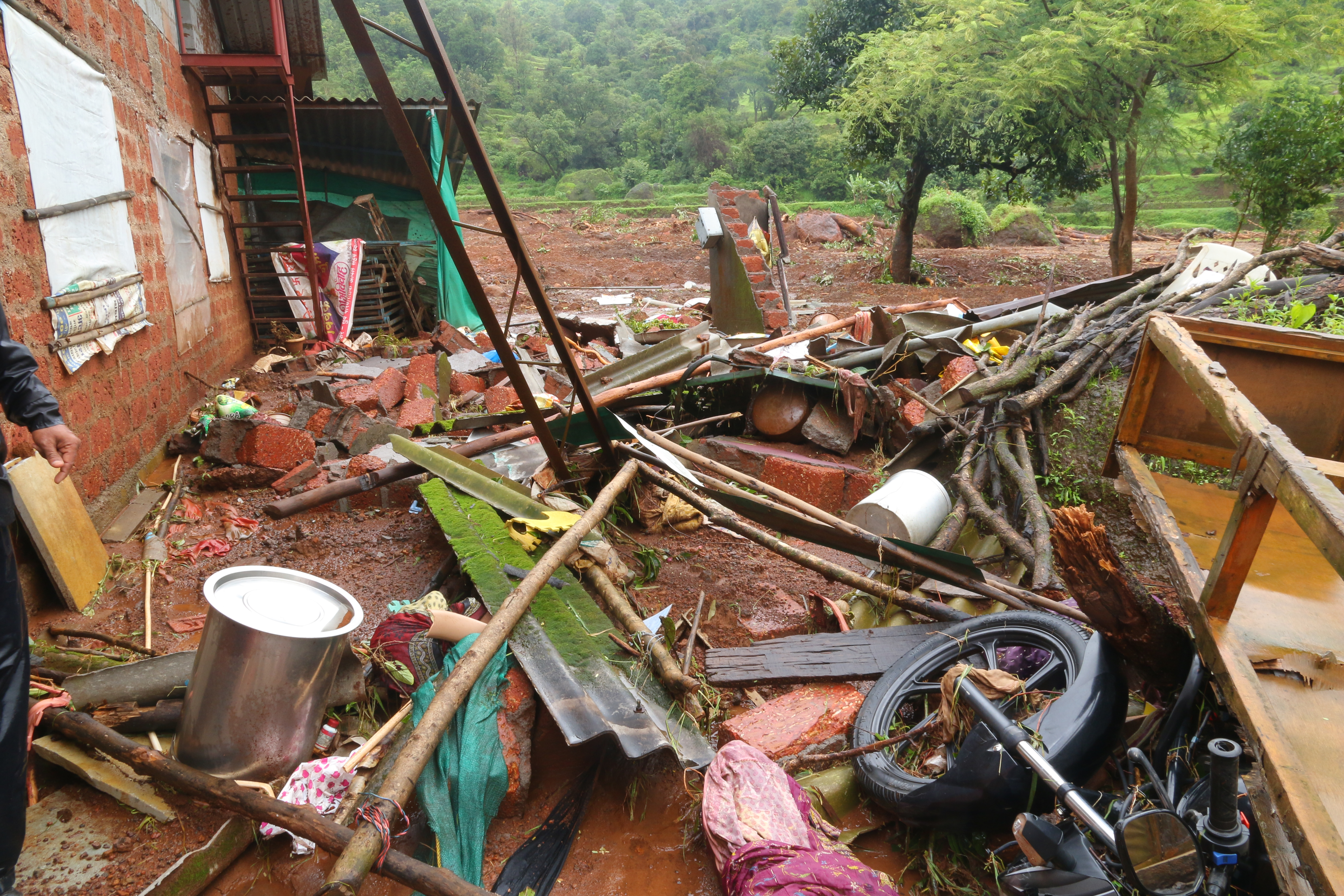
Image of a house in Humbarli that was destroyed by extreme weather and flooding. As climate change gets worse, many parts of India will experience more extreme weather, which will cause extra rainfall as well as drought.

Temperature rises on the Tibetan Plateau are causing Himalayan glaciers to retreat, threatening the flow rate of the Ganga, Brahmaputra, Yamuna, and other major rivers; the livelihoods of hundreds of thousands of farmers depend on these rivers. A 2007 World Wide Fund for Nature (WWF) report states that the Indus River may run dry for the same reason.

Meghalaya, meaning 'Abode of the Clouds' in Hindi & Sanskrit alike—is home to the towns of Cherrapunji and Mawsynram, which are credited with being the wettest places in the world due to their high rainfall. But scientists state that global climate change is causing these areas to experience an increasingly sparse and erratic rainfall pattern and a lengthened dry season, affecting the livelihoods of thousands of villagers who cultivate paddy and maize. Meghalaya faced water crises in 2023 and 2025.

=== Ecosystems ===
Ecological disasters, such as a 1998 coral bleaching event that killed off more than 70% of corals in the reef ecosystems off Lakshadweep and the Andamans and was brought on by elevated ocean temperatures tied to global warming, are also projected to become increasingly common.

== Climate justice ==
Environmental geographer Mehebub Sahana found that climate change has the potential to exacerbate inequalities due to how it disproportionately affects impoverished individuals and nations, as well as minorities and marginalised groups.

Some scholars argue that the climate change crisis is a social justice issue in India, first because India has historically contributed less greenhouse gas emissions in comparison to other countries—such as the United States—and secondly due to how structural inequalities result in certain Indian populations experiencing the effects of climate change disproportionately.

For example, according to environmental studies scholar Prakash Kashwan:

"Clearly, the worst impacts of air pollution and the climate crisis are being denied, ignored, and normalised, because these burdens fall on the urban poor, women, Dalits, Adivasis, Muslims, and other marginalised people with little political voice. Accordingly, India is an archetypal site for the manifestation of the myriad injustices associated with the climate crisis."

=== History ===
India's current social inequalities have a historical basis, which provides insight into why certain groups experience the effects of climate change disproportionately.

According to some scholars, such as psychologist Vina Goghari and sociologist Jan Breman, India's history of colonialism deepened India's feudal tendencies, in turn institutionalising the social and political hierarchies inherent in India's caste system. For instance, when Britain colonised India in the 18th century, the colonisers perceived that Indian society was organised by a four-fold caste system and a class of "untouchable" castes outside the main four. Embedded in this theory was that upper-castes consisted of lighter-skinned, more evolved citizens who descended from a superior civilisation, while the lower-castes consisted of darker-skinned, less-evolved, indigenous citizens. The British solidified this hierarchy by legalising the classification of the "untouchable castes". For example, the British dug separate wells, set up special schools, and started reservation policies for the lower castes.

The social structure that the British legalised remains the predominant way that Indian society is portrayed globally and is still a prevalent social hierarchy system. Even when India claimed independence from Britain in 1947, these structures remained and prevented lower castes from gaining equality. At the time, those at the bottom of the social pyramid were prevented from exercising their right to vote.

The "untouchables" are from the lowest stratum of castes, which the Indian government calls "Scheduled Castes", and consist of 20.6% of the population. Historically, the untouchables were viewed as dirty and polluting due to their occupations involving tasks considered to be physically or ritually polluting, such as working with dead bodies or human waste. Dalit—meaning "broken or scattered"—is the name for these lower castes today.

Also among the lowest castes are the Adivasis, which are indigenous peoples whom the Indian government refers to as "Scheduled Tribes". The Adivasis are recognised by the National Commission of Scheduled Tribes by markers that demonstrate economic and social "backwardness" and geographic isolation.

Due to the social hierarchies, income inequality is high in India. In 2022–23, income inequality was at its highest ever, with 40.1% of the income and wealth being held by the top one percent of the population.

These social inequalities mean that certain groups—such as Dalits—experience the effects of climate change disproportionately. For instance, Dalits and Adivasis are more likely to heavily rely on natural resources which climate change-related natural disasters put in jeopardy. They are also more likely to live in low-income areas that are less resilient to issues like flooding and extreme heat.

=== Economic consequences ===
India has the world's highest social cost of carbon, amounting to US$86 per tonne of carbon dioxide (Sen and Sahoo) This means that each additional tonne of CO2 will cost the Indian economy US$86. While India, the US and China are the world's largest carbon polluters, the social cost of carbon is only US$50 per tonne for the US and US$26 per tonne for China. A report by the London-based global think tank Overseas Development Institute found that India may lose anywhere around 3–10% of its GDP annually by 2100 and its poverty rate may rise by 3.5% in 2040 due to climate change.

==== Reduced crop yields ====
Climate change in India will have disproportionate ramifications for the more than 400 million that make up India's poor community. This is because so many depend on natural resources for their food, shelter and income. Indian farmers are the first to feel the economic effects of climate change since 85% of Indian farmers have low financial resilience. More than 56% of people in India work in agriculture, while many others earn their living in coastal areas.

The effects of climate change on Indian agriculture were investigated through the National Innovations in Climate Resilient Agriculture (NICRA) study. The findings indicate that rain-fed rice yields in India are expected to experience a marginal reduction of less than 2.5% in the years 2050 and 2080. On the other hand, irrigated rice yields are projected to decline by 7% in 2050 and 10% in 2080 scenarios. Moreover, the study forecasts a decrease in wheat yield ranging from 6% to 25% in the year 2100, while maize yields are estimated to decrease by 18% to 23% during the same period. However, there is a potential positive effect on chickpea, with anticipated productivity increases of 23% to 54% in the future climates.

=== Health effects ===
==== Air pollution ====
Air pollution and climate change are deeply intertwined since many of the same activities that warm the climate–such as burning fossil fuels–also increase air pollution. India is already one of the world's most polluted countries: according to IQAir AirVisual's 2019 World Air Quality Report, 21 of the world's 30 cities with the worst air pollution are located in India. New Delhi is the most polluted capital city, with concentrations of particulate matter (PM2.5) nearly 10 times higher than the World Health Organization guidelines. A 2021 study estimated that 2.5 million people die from toxic air every year in India.

Lower middle-income countries like India often have greater levels of air pollution due to less stringent air quality regulations, the prevalence of older polluting machinery, and congested public transport. Air pollution is the worst in urban areas, where rapid industrialisation results in greater levels of PM 2.5 being released into the air. Lower-income and marginalised urban communities, largely made up of lower-caste individuals, in India are at the greatest risk of experiencing the detrimental effects of heavy air pollution since these populations tend to reside in areas with greater pollution and often have low-paying jobs that require physical and outdoor labor.

Heavy air pollution worsens the effects of heat waves by creating a ground-level ozone haze, leading to increased mortality.

==== Heat waves ====
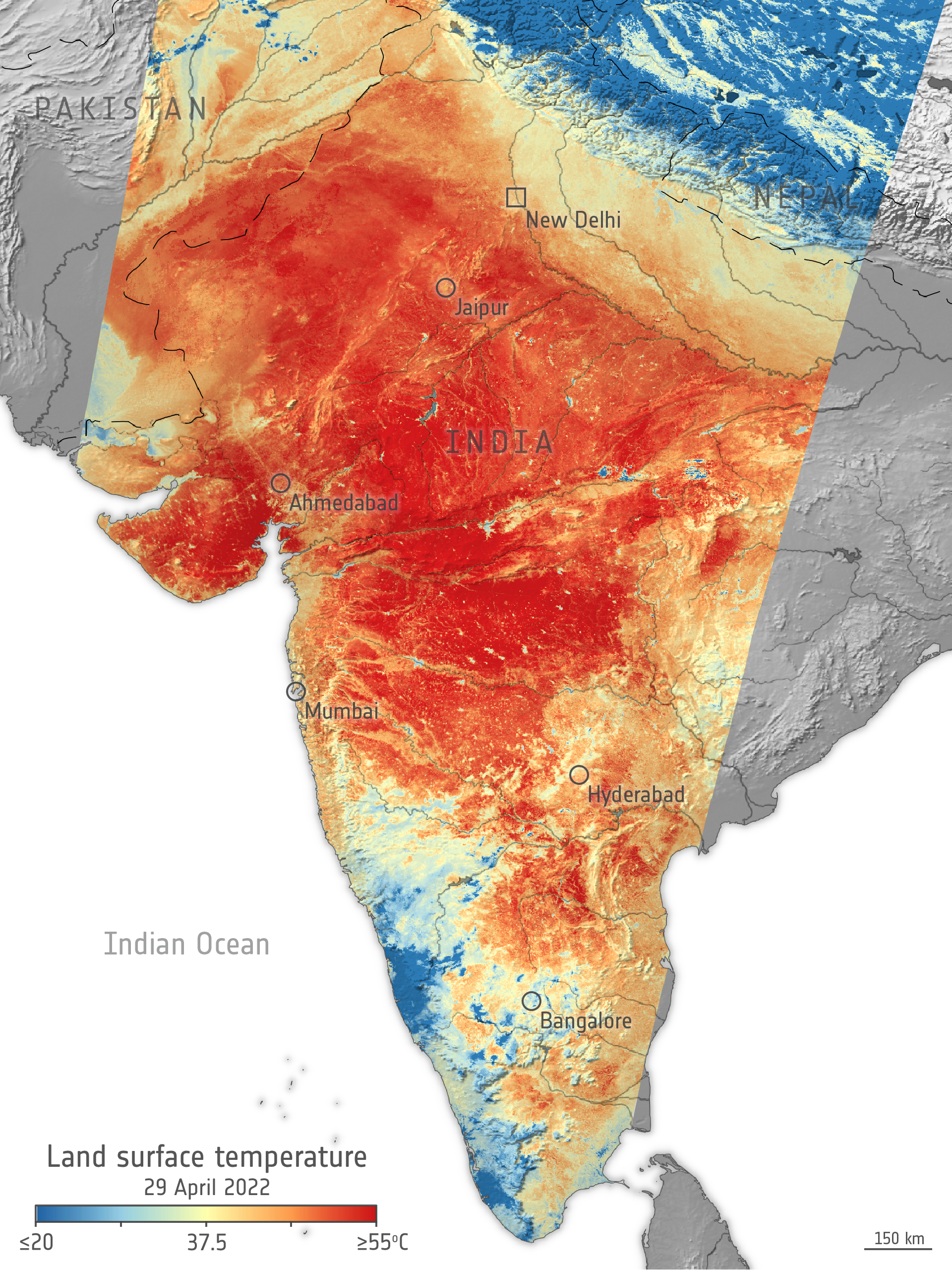
Satellite visualisation of the 2022 Indian heat wave.

Heat waves' frequency and power are increasing in India because of climate change. According to one study by environmental scientist Jeroen de Bont and their peers, "the burden of disease associated with extreme heat is particularly pronounced in India where extreme environmental exposure intersects with unplanned urbanization, poor-quality housing, declining urban green cover and other vulnerabilities in the world's most populous country."

In 2019, the temperature reached 50.6 degrees Celsius, 36 people were killed. The high temperatures are expected to affect 23 states in 2019, up from nine in 2015 and 19 in 2018. The number of heat wave days has increased—not just day temperature, night temperatures increased also. 2018 was the country's sixth hottest year on record, and 11 of its 15 warmest years have occurred since 2004. In 2024, the capital New Delhi recorded the country's hottest-ever temperature 49.9 degrees Celsius. In response, New Delhi authorities warned citizens of water shortages, cutting supplies in some areas. The water prime minister, Atishi Marlena, called for "collective responsibility" to deal with water scarcity and reduced water supply from twice a day to once a day in some areas. Also in 2024, the heat waves caused problems for India's elections, when 33 poll workers died from extreme heat.

In India, exposure to heat waves is said to increase by 8 times between 2021 and 2050, and by 300% by the end of this century. The number of Indians exposed to heat waves increased by 200% from 2010 to 2016. Heat waves also affect farm labour productivity. The heat waves affect central and northwestern India the most, and the eastern coast and Telangana have also been affected. In 2015, the latter places witnessed at least 2500 deaths. In 2016, for the first time in history, Kerala reported a heat wave. The government is being advised by the Indian Institute of Tropical Meteorology in predicting and mitigating heat waves. The government of Andhra Pradesh, for instance, is creating a Heat Wave Action Plan.

=== Climate displacement ===
Around seven million people are projected to be displaced due to, among other factors, submersion of parts of Mumbai and Chennai, if global temperatures were to rise by 2 °C (3.6 °F).

By the year 2050, India is expected to witness a significant increase in climate-related displacement, with around 45 million people compelled to migrate from their homes due to climate disasters. This number is three times higher than the current count of individuals being displaced because of extreme weather events. According to the State of India's Environment-2022 report, India ranks as the fourth worst-affected country globally in terms of climate change-induced migration, with over three million people forced to abandon their residences in the year 2020–2021. Furthermore, according to the Internal Displacement Monitoring Centre's Global Report on External Displacement, in 2024 India recorded 5.4 million internal displacements, the highest in South Asia. These statistics emphasise the escalating consequences of climate change on migration patterns within the country.

Villagers in India's North Eastern state of Meghalaya are also concerned that rising sea levels will submerge neighbouring low-lying Bangladesh, resulting in an influx of refugees into Meghalaya which has few resources to handle such a situation.

=== Most vulnerable populations ===
Certain communities in India experience the effects of climate change disproportionately. For instance, Adivasi communities—which are forest-dwelling tribal communities—are more vulnerable due to their geographic isolation and dependence on natural resources. Forest ecosystems are prone to climate change effects like floods, droughts, heatwaves, wildfires, and cyclones. A lack of recognition of forest rights coupled with poverty can make their vulnerability more complex.

Since Adivasi communities reside in forested, resource-rich areas, they are often the targets of land-grabs, resource grabs, and green grabs, which is taking control of a territory in the name of conservation.

Mitigation measures will also affect indigenous communities. A report from the Special Rapporteurs Permanent Forum on Indigenous Issues identified the rights of indigenous communities which will be adversely affected by mitigation measures: the right to self-determination, the right to informed consent, the right to health, water and food, and the right to culture and traditional knowledge.

Some Adivasis have expressed the injustice of having contributed minimally to climate change but bearing the burden of mitigation. One forest-dweller in Talabria, Odisha said in an interview: "I do not understand why we are the only community required to conserve the forests. Shouldn't this be the responsibility of the state?"

Similarly, Dalits rely heavily on natural resources for their livelihoods. Consequently, the effects of climate change—such as droughts and flooding—disproportionately affect Dalit communities.

Citizens living in Indian cities are also particularly vulnerable to climate change due to rapid population growth, high levels of socioeconomic inequality, and inability of infrastructure to adapt to the projected consequences. The outskirts of cities are often wealthy enclaves, while the urban poor are concentrated in city centres and informal settlements and are often not recognised in urban planning policies. Indian cities are vulnerable to flooding and extreme heat, issues that will only be exacerbated by climate change.

== Mitigation ==
India is ranked high in Climate Change Performance Index 2021

=== Greenhouse gas sinks ===
Land use, land-use change, and forestry absorbed 300 megatonnes (Mt) of CO_{2eq} in 2014 and in 2020 total carbon stored in forests was 7000 Mt. However, from 2001, to 2018, India lost 1.67Mha of tree cover, equivalent to a 4.3% reduction since 2000. Climate change impact studies on India's forests indicate that future warmer conditions, and in many regions wetter conditions, together with rising CO₂, can support higher carbon storage in India’s forests, though with strong regional differences.

=== Energy policy ===
The National Energy Plan is in accord with the Paris Agreement target of 2 °C global warming, but if India stopped building coal-fired power stations it would meet the 1.5 °C aspiration. India pledged to achieve electric power generation of 40% percent non-fossil fuel energy by 2030. Currently, India still produces 73% of electricity from coal and there are no plans for phase-out.

Calculations in 2021 showed that, for giving the world a 50% chance of avoiding a temperature rise of 2 degrees or more India should increase its climate commitments by 55%. For a 95% chance it should increase the commitments by 147%. For giving a 50% chance of staying below 1.5 degrees India should increase its commitments by 191%.

In its Biennial Update Report to the United Nations Framework Convention on Climate Change (UNFCCC) submitted in February, India said it has progressively continued decoupling of economic growth from greenhouse gas emissions. India's emission intensity of gross domestic product (GDP) has reduced by 24% between 2005 and 2016. India is therefore on track to meet its voluntary declaration to reduce the emission intensity of GDP by 20–25% from 2005 levels by 2020, making India the only G20 nation to meet climate goals.

India's Intended Nationally Determined Contribution includes reducing emission intensity by a third by 2030. India has adequate carbon neutral resources such as biomass, wind, solar, hydro power including pumped storage, etc. to achieve net zero carbon emissions. India has made significant strides in the energy sector and the country is now a global leader in renewable energy.

With accelerated coal plant closures, and an anticipated surge in renewables, thermal power will account for only an estimated 42.7% of installed capacity across India by 2027, down dramatically from 66.8% in 2017.

Cutting greenhouse gas emissions, and therefore air pollution in India, would have health benefits worth 4 to 5 times the cost, which would be the most cost-effective in the world.

However, India's renewable energy policies also have detrimental effects on some of its citizens. By 2022, more than 2,800 people were affected by the government's acquisition of large tracts of land to use for renewable energy power plants.

=== Policies and legislation ===
The Indian Government as well as various state governments have taken certain steps in accordance with India's energy policy and the Paris Agreement. Following are some of those steps:

- Doubling India's renewable energy target to 450 gigawatts (GW) by 2030
- National Solar Mission
- Wind power in India

In 2008, India published its National Action Plan on Climate Change (NAPCC), which contains several goals for the country. These goals include but are not limited to: covering one third of the country with forests and trees, increasing renewable energy supply to 6% of total energy mix by 2022, and the further maintenance of disaster management. All of the actions work to improve the resiliency of the country as a whole, and this proves to be important because India has an economy closely tied to its natural resource base and climate-sensitive sectors such as agriculture, water, and forestry.

While presenting the fiscal year 2020-2021 state budget for the Indian state of Odisha, the then Finance Minister of the state Niranjan Pujari introduced the Climate Budget. Climate budget aims to keep track of the expenses made by the government for climate change or to support mitigation and adaptation actions to address climate change. As per the document, It will help the government to decide whether to redesign or safeguard the existing projects by seeing their effects on climate change. Odisha has become the first state in India to introduce climate budget.

Niti Aayog is in the process of devising a policy framework and its deployment mechanism in India for carbon capture and utilisation or storage (CCUS) to reduce greenhouse emissions per unit of economic activity.

The right to be free from adverse effects of climate change was legally recognised as a fundamental right in India by the Supreme Court, in 2024. This decision can affect further climate legislation in India.

Despite this, India currently has limited policies to assist its most vulnerable populations from climate change effects. India's disaster risk management policies are limited to disaster relief that only addresses extreme weather events and does not include instances of displacement or migration due to environmental stress.

For example, India has rehabilitation and disaster reduction policies in place to address rapid-onset disasters such as monsoons and cyclones, but does not have policies to address coastal displacement due to slow-onset disasters like coastal erosion.

According to the Migration Policy Institute, "India's current response of segregated planned relocation and strengthening or expanding coastal protective structures through coastal zone management at best can provide only a temporary respite."

One scholar, Namrata Archarya, explains that India's climate policies are "top-down", meaning they are often exclusionary in nature. Archarya claims that India's government needs to adopt a "bottom-up" approach in order to incorporate the needs of its citizens, especially those who occupy lower castes and reside in rural areas, in turn achieving climate justice.

For achieving the aims of the Paris agreement India must peak power sector emissions by 2026. Until recently the country was expected to reach this target, but the recent governmental push for coal undermined it. In 2017, India spent US$10.8 billion on fossil fuel subsidies, almost entirely on petroleum.

As a whole, while India has taken certain steps for climate change mitigation. As a rapidly industrialising global power, the nation has pushed for its right to development despite its significant exposure to climate change effects.

=== Carbon emission trading and pricing ===
Carbon emission trading is yet to be implemented in India. However, related instruments such as energy saving certificates (PAT), various renewable purchase obligations (RPO), and renewable energy certificates (REC) are traded on the power exchanges regularly.

India does not have a carbon tax, but since 2010 the country has had a tax on both domestically produced and imported coal, which powers more than half of its electricity generation. Originally set at ₹50 (52¢ US) per tonne of coal, it was raised to ₹100 in 2014 and ₹200 in 2015. As of 2020 the coal tax stands at ₹400 (US$4.20) per tonne.

In contrast to implementing a carbon tax, in 2017, India spent US$1.8 billion on fossil fuel subsidies, almost entirely on petroleum.

=== International cooperation ===
Indian Prime Minister Narendra Modi announcing India's target of achieving net zero emissions by 2070 at the 2021 United Nations Climate Change Conference.

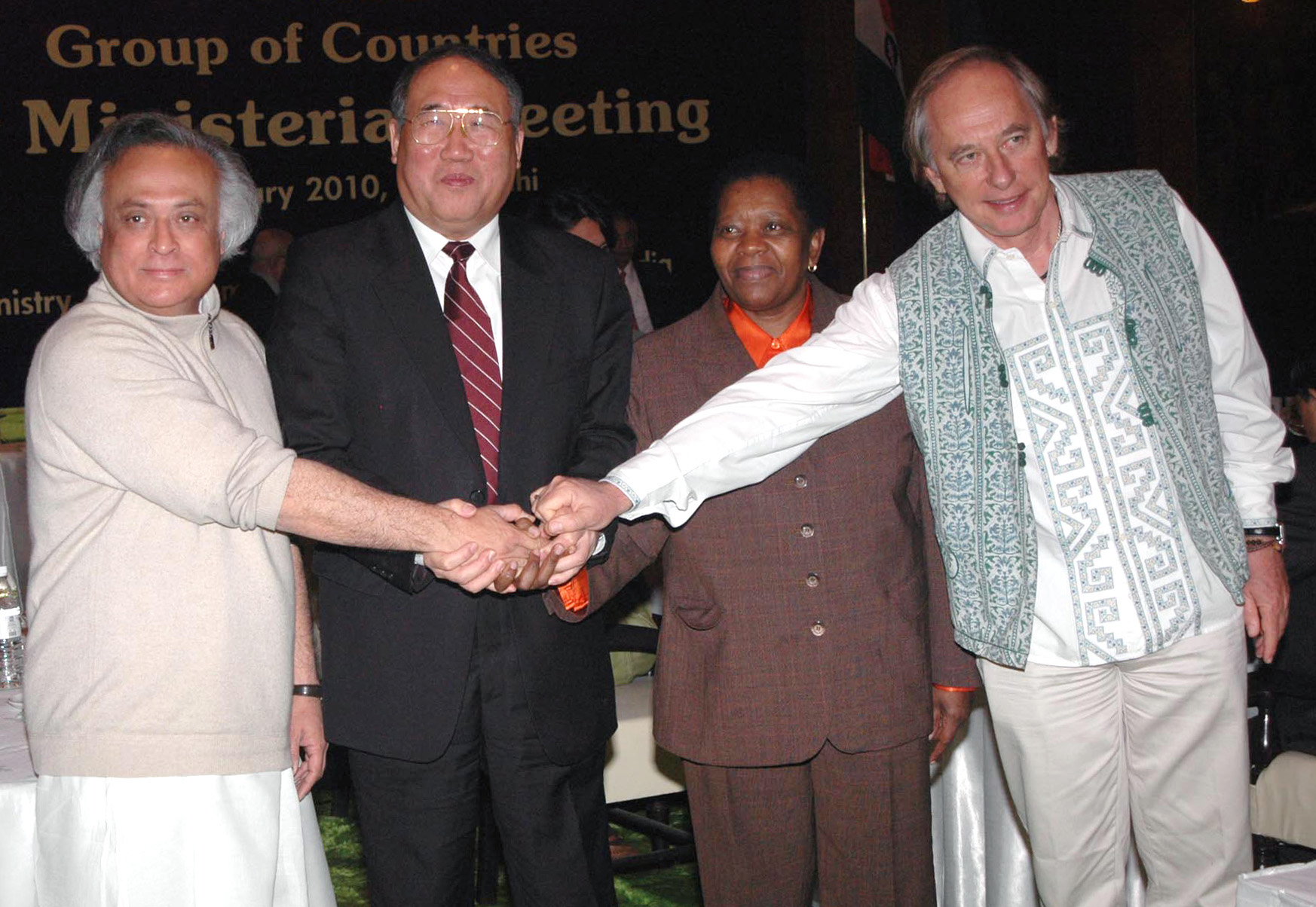
Jairam Ramesh meeting with environment ministers from BASIC countries to discuss climate change issues following the 2009 Copenhagen summit.

As a party to the Paris Agreement India submitted its first biennial transparency report to the UNFCCC by 2024 and inventory figures in standard format. In September 2021 India announced that it will submit a new Nationally Determined Contribution before COP26. At COP26, India set the latest target date planning to be net-zero by 2070. This was the first time in that a date for carbon neutrality has been given as part of India's climate policy.

At COP26 Indian prime minister Narendra Modi announced 5 main commitments called Panchamrit – "India's gift to the world":

- Reaching carbon neutrality by 2070.
- Expand the energy capacity not coming from fossil fuels to 500GW by 2030.
- Cut the carbon intensity of economy by 45% by 2030.
- Draw half of its energy requirement from renewable sources by 2030.
- Cut 1 billion tonnes of GHG emission from the amount projected to the year 2030.

The prime minister also proposed to advance a new agenda: LIFE - Lifestyle for Environment, meaning changing lifestyle for benefit the environment.

Even though the date of net zero is far behind that of China and the US and India's government wants to continue with the use of coal, Indian environmentalists and economists applauded the decision, describing it as a bold climate action.

India together with the European Union, Brazil and 15 other countries had joined the Open Coalition on Compliance Carbon Markets. The coalition aims to establish a global carbon market and is considered as one of the main results of COP 30. A global carbon market can speed up emission reduction seven-fold. India can get revenue from this project equal to 1.9% of the overall governmental revenue with a price of 50 dollars per ton of CO2.

== Adaptation ==
An ice stupa designed by Sonam Wangchuk brings glacial water to farmers in the Himalayan Desert of Ladakh, India.

A research project conducted between 2014 and 2018 in the five districts (Puri, Khordha, Jagatsinghpur, Kendrapara and Bhadrak) of Mahanadi Delta, Odisha and two districts (North and South 24 Parganas) of Indian Bengal Delta (includes the Indian Sundarbans), West Bengal provides evidence on the kinds of adaptations practiced by the delta dwellers. In the Mahanadi delta, the top three practiced adaptations were changing the amount of fertiliser used in the farm, the use of loans, and planting of trees around the homes. In the Indian Bengal Delta, the top three adaptations were changing the amount of fertiliser used in the farm, making changes to irrigation practices, and use of loans. Migration as an adaptation option is practiced in both these deltas but is not considered as a successful adaptation.

In the Indian Sundarbans of West Bengal, farmers are cultivating salt-tolerant rice varieties which have been revived to combat the increasing issue of soil salinity. Other agricultural adaptations include mixed farming, diversifying crops, rain water harvesting, drip irrigation, use of neem-based pesticide, and ridge and farrow land shaping techniques where "the furrows help with drainage and the less-saline ridges can be used to grow vegetables". These have helped farmers to grow a second crop of vegetables besides the monsoon paddy crop.

In Puri district of Odisha, water logging is a hazard that affects people yearly. In the Totashi village, many women are turning the water logging in their fields to their advantage by cultivating vegetables in the waterlogged fields and boosting their family income and nutrition.

Education is an integral tool that can be used in the adaptation of the measures that have been put in place to curb climate change. When considering the adaptation of measures that have been established to curb climate change, it is important to ensure that the education system has been included in such a project. By improving people's knowledge of climate change, it would be easier for them to adopt different mitigation measures. Also, there is a need to instill a culture among the younger generation on the best practices when it comes to environmental matters. The government must seek to ensure that systems that support learning, which undergirds adaptation are supported to enhance adaptation.

== Society and culture ==
=== Media coverage ===
A qualitative analysis of some mainstream Indian newspapers (particularly opinion and editorial pieces) during the release of the IPCC 4th Assessment Report and during the Nobel Peace Prize win by Al Gore and the IPCC found that Indian media strongly pursue the frame of scientific certainty in their coverage of climate change. Another 2010 study found that the Indian press almost entirely endorses climate change as scientific reality due to anthropogenic causes. This is in contrast to the skepticism displayed by American newspapers at the time. Alongside, Indian media highlight frames of energy challenge, social progress, public accountability and looming disaster. This sort of coverage finds parallels in European media narratives as well and helps build a transnational, globalised discourse on climate change. For instance, the survey found that 38.5% of articles dealing with mitigation believed that only the North should cut its emissions, while 55.2% advocated for actions to be taken globally but in a differentiated way.

One study analyzing the news coverage of India's record-breaking 2022 heatwave found that many Indian news sources downplayed the connection between the heatwave and climate change. This study also found a significant lack of news articles in regional Indian languages, which is the primary language for many Indian citizens.

=== Activism ===
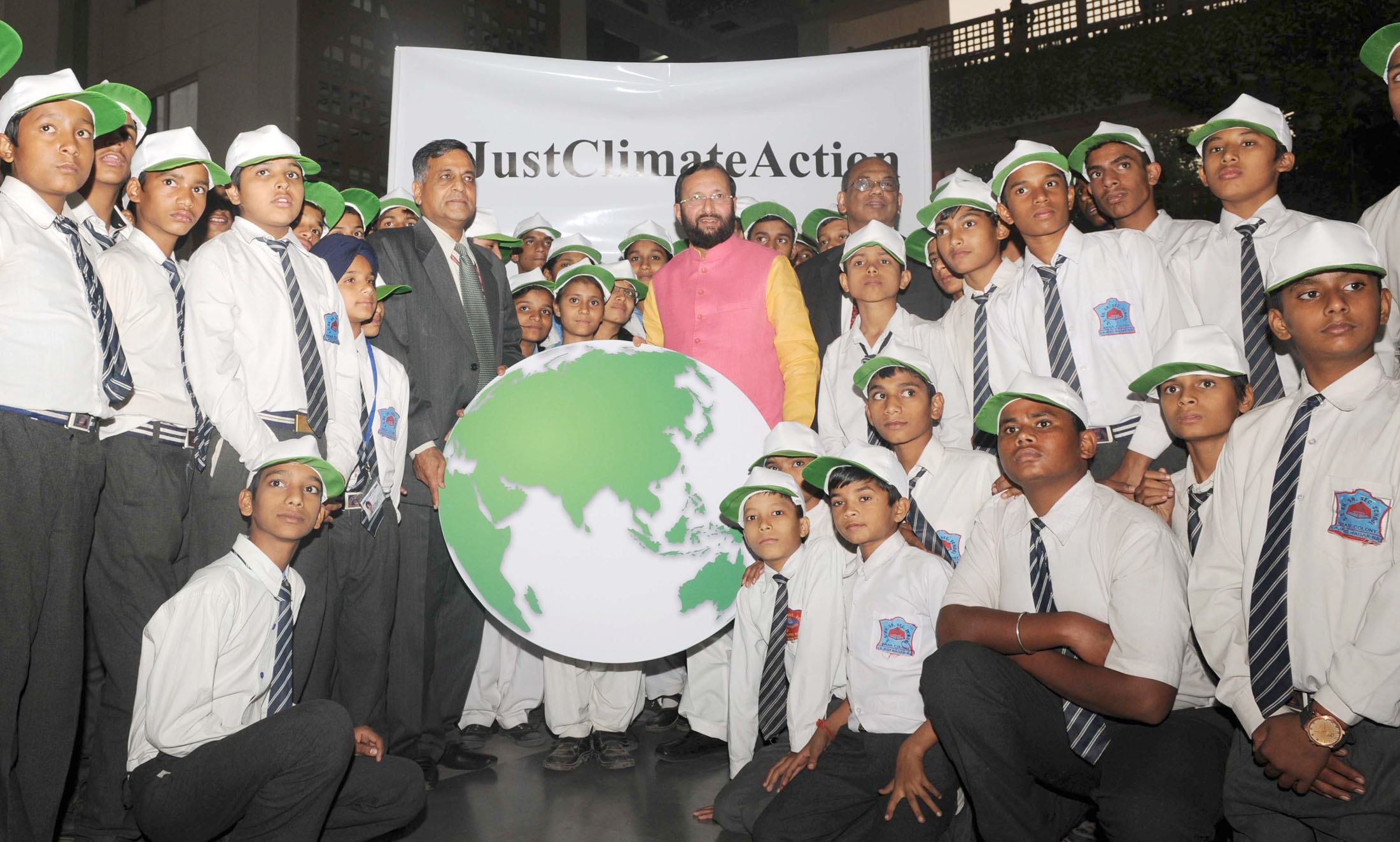
Schoolchildren pose with Minister of State for Environment and Climate Change Shri Prakash Javadekar in New Delhi.

Many youth climate groups have become more prominent in recent years. For instance, there have been school strikes for climate organised by activists such as Disha Ravi. In 2008, the India Youth Climate Network was established, seeking to bring awareness to climate change through workshops, training, and "climate satsangs". Other prominent youth groups include Fridays for Future India, which has 60 local chapters across India, and Extinction Rebellion, which has 14 groups in Indian states and cities. These groups organise approximately monthly strikes, modelling the Fridays for Future movement in Europe.

Youth movements have seen pushback from the government. In 2020, the Indian government blocked the website of Futures for Friday for 2 weeks, as well as the website of Let India Breathe–another youth organisation–for 26 days. Disha Ravi, a 22-year-old member of Fridays for Future, was arrested in 2021 on charges of sedition and criminal conspiracy in connection to a farmers' protest toolkit shared by Greta Thunberg. Also in 2021, warrants were issued against Nikita Jacob and Shantanu Muluk, members of Extinction Rebellion.

Tribal people in India's remote northeastern state, Meghalaya, honoured former US Vice President Al Gore in 2007 with an award for promoting awareness on climate change with his documentary "An Inconvenient Truth." The leaders honoured him due to their concerns about how climate change will affect their homeland, and for how the documentary illustrates the devastating effects of climate change on the globe.

In 2005, the Dandakaranya Movement, a tree planting campaign, was started by Indian politician Balasaheb Thorat, as part of the UN Environment Programme's Billion Tree Campaign. They had planted 90 million seeds as of 2007.

Environmental casteism, which is an anti-caste movement that explores the intersection between caste and resource distribution, has been gaining prominence in recent years. Contemporary Indian environmental policies tend to be caste-blind. According to earth sciences scholar Mukul Sharma, this caste-blind environmentalism is harmful for how it fails to take into account how resources are unevenly distributed between different castes. In response Dalit communities have begun to advocate for their perspectives through activism. According to scholar Mehebub Sahana, this movement aims to counter the "exclusionary nature of Hindu nationalist environmentalism [which] deepens socio-economic inequalities."

The state of Jharkhand has a large movement of organisations campaigning for Adivasi rights to land and forest resources. For example, the Jharkhand Mines Area Coordination Committee (JMACC) campaigns against corruption of extractive development processes, organises citizen tribunals, and demands compensation. In the state of Chhattisgarh, there is the Chhattisgarh Muki Morcha trade union, a pan-Indian grassroots movement called Ekta Parishad, and the Chhattisgarh Bachao Andolan group which agitates coal mining.

However, protests are difficult to organise in Chhattisgarh due to the state's systematic silencing of such events. The rise of corporate-owned media further stifles dissent.

== See also ==
- Climate change adaptation
- Climate change mitigation
- Climate finance
- Plug-in electric vehicles in India
- Climate change in South Asia
