= Carbon market in India =

Market in India for greenhouse gas emissions

A carbon market in India was introduced through Energy Conservation (Amendment) Bill, 2022 to follow United Nations Climate Change Conference (COP26) as an attempt reduce fossil fuel consumption through use of non-fossil sources such as green hydrogen, green ammonia, biomass, and bioethanol as energy and feedstock.

The Indian National Carbon Trading Scheme is a carbon emission trading scheme being developed by the Bureau of Energy Efficiency in India, which may start as a voluntary market in 2026. It is expected to start trading existing Renewable Energy Certificates (REC) and Energy Savings Certificates (ESC) by 2025 and for these to become Carbon Credit Certificates by 2026. It was legislated in 2022. It has been suggested that mandatory carbon allowances could be included in future so that it would become a carbon market similar to the Chinese and EU ETS. Without this, Indian exports could suffer from carbon tariffs such as the EU CBAM. The director of the bureau says that it will become the world's largest carbon market by 2030.

== Why a Carbon Market? ==
Due to India's fast growing population and economy it began to increase its fuel consumption. India's carbon market is roughly estimated to be worth over 1.2 billion dollars. It is the world's second largest source of carbon as of 2024. Due to the over pollutant in air India created what we know as the carbon market. The carbon market was made to combat climate change and keep global warming at 1.5C or lower. Carbon markets compensate for companies' greenhouse gas emissions and purchasing these carbon credits can remove or reduce their greenhouse gas emissions. Companies are not the only ones able to buy carbon credits but any individual can. Carbon credits are beneficial exports to the economy as it helps with the reduction of greenhouse gas emissions which can help improve the sustainability of natural habitats.

== Goals ==
The government of India established a carbon market in India, improved the Code for Energy Conservation Building and helped to build the governing council of the Bureau of Energy Efficiency through increasing members. The bill aimed to make the use of non-fossil fuel sources mandatory for energy and encourage feedstocks like green ammonia, green hydrogen, ethanol and biomass.

== Benefits ==
The carbon market in India seeks the following benefits:

- Improves agricultural practices and social communities through emission reductions to improve their source of income through the voluntary credit market.
- Helps in protecting coastal areas and improving agricultural productivity.
- Economic development projects for community and gender and conservation of biodiversity through voluntary credit markets using premium pricing.
- Providing an additional source of money for low-income households by upgrading cooking systems.

== Features ==
The carbon market in India includes multiple features:

- A system of trading to buy and sell credits permitting an industrial unit to emit a specific amount of greenhouse gas.
- Compliance is voluntary.
- Credits are to be used in the domestic market instead of export.
- Clean energy can allow India to develop capacity as an energy exporter.

== Challenges ==
The mechanism of the carbon market in India can face challenges of corruption and environmental concerns. Implementation may take time and should be done in a phased manner.

== See also ==
- Carbon credit
