= PROVE IT Act =

Proposed US carbon monitoring legislation

Providing Reliable, Objective, Verifiable Emissions Intensity and Transparency
- Other short titles: PROVE IT Act
- Long title: To require the Secretary of Energy to conduct a study and submit a report on the greenhouse gas emissions intensity of certain products produced in the United States and in certain foreign countries, and for other purposes.

Legislative history
- Introduced in the United States Senate as S. 1863 by Chris Coons D‑DE, Kevin Cramer R‑ND on June 7, 2023; Committee consideration by United States Senate Committee on Environment and Public Works

The Providing Reliable, Objective, Verifiable Emissions Intensity and Transparency (PROVE IT) Act (S.1863) is a bill in the United States Senate to study the greenhouse gas intensity of certain industrial products of the United States and other countries. Chris Coons (D‑DE), its lead Senate sponsor, intends it to "provide reliable data that’s needed to quantify the climate benefits of the United States’ investments in cleaner, more efficient manufacturing practices and to hold nations like China accountable for their emissions-heavy production of goods like steel." John Curtis (R‑UT 3rd), the bill's lead House sponsor, describes it as "leveling the playing field in international competition" given US regulations and technology for cleaner energy. He also envisions it helping to "strengthen our trade relationships, and provide our allies with a reliable energy partner."

The measure has been described by the Washington Post as a "rare example of bipartisan climate policy".

== History ==
Senators Chris Coons and Kevin Cramer introduced the bill on June 7, 2023 within the Environment and Public Works Committee (EPW Committee).

The committee performed and passed, 14–5, a markup of the measure in January 2024, with four Republicans (Cramer, Lindsey Graham, Cynthia Lummis, and John Boozman) in support alongside the committee's Democrats. Some conservatives fear that the data collected will lead to an import tariff or a domestic carbon tax. In response, Cramer, himself an opponent of a domestic carbon tax, amended the act to clarify that it does not grant any federal authority for a greenhouse gas tax or duty.

Senator Lindsey Graham describes the bill as a means to secure emissions cuts from major polluters such as China and India.

On July 9, 2024, representatives John Curtis and Scott Peters (D‑CA 50th) introduced the House version of the act, with a total of 21 co-sponsors, ten Republicans and eleven Democrats. Curtis described the delay as necessary while he built support among Republicans wary of climate policies. Backers hope that the bill will be the subject of a hearing or be included in a year-end spending deal.

Peters describes the PROVE IT Act as a response to the European Carbon Border Adjustment Mechanism (CBAM), which takes effect in 2026 after a reporting phase that began in October 2023. He describes the CBAM as a tariff enacted by the European Union against the United States (and other countries) to protect European investments in climate action, to which he adds, "So what’s our response? We should have the information about the value of the investments we’re making … what are they worth in terms of greenhouse gas reduction, so we’re on an even playing field?" A Cramer press release described the bill as a data-driven rebuttal to potential trade discrimination in the EU CBAM against American manufacturers.

Despite some conservative skepticism, provisions of the Act were passed by Congress as part of a funding package and signed into law in January 2026. The provisions were included in a bill report accompanying a three-bill "minibus" of the 2026 Energy-Water, Interior-Environment, and Commerce-Justice Science measures funding major energy and environmental agencies. Though not technically law, agencies typically follow such reports. The Department of Energy, in consultation with the National Energy Technology Laboratory, is to conduct the comprehensive study of emissions intensities.

== Reception ==
Cramer expressed optimism in January after the committee vote that the bill would arrive on the Senate floor, alone or in a package, and that education about the bill would sway opponents. Boozman expressed hope that many of the opponents could be convinced to vote yes. Trump White House climate adviser George David Banks said even some of the opposing EPW committee members are "gettable."

Centrist and conservative climate groups support the bill, alongside trade groups such as the American Petroleum Institute and US Chamber of Commerce. Other lobbying groups have opposed it, including the libertarian Competitive Enterprise Institute. In July 2024, the American Iron and Steel Institute, Portland Cement Association, Climate Leadership Council, and five other trade associations and advocacy groups called on House representatives to co-sponsor, describing the bill as supporting "faster permitting and more balanced regulations for U.S. facilities across industries" and "better policies to promote more U.S. investment as a key tool for global decarbonization."

George Banks, suggested that former US Trade Representative Robert Lighthizer could favorably influence Republican thinking, especially if Donald Trump won the 2024 Presidential election and appointed him USTR again.

== Policy provisions ==
The bill's provisions direct the Department of Energy (DOE) to publish within two years a study of the average emissions intensity nearly two dozen produced in the United States and a number of other countries of interest, and the relative emissions intensity of products from the U.S. compared to the other countries. The countries of interest include the G7, free trade agreement partners, and those responsible for a large global market share. The study would also identify gaps and the trustworthiness of the data. The DOE would be responsible for updating the data every five years. The Act also supports international collaboration in data-gathering.

The data is to be published in an online database. Greenhouse gas emissions other than carbon dioxide are to be evaluated on the basis of the number of metric tons of carbon dioxide with equivalent global warming potential. Emissions intensity is to be determined as an average over each country of interest. The bill also does not provide "provide any new authority to any federal agency to impose, collect or enforce a greenhouse gas emissions tax, fee, duty, price or charge."

The covered goods include:

- aluminum
- cement
- iron and steel
- plastic
- biofuel
- crude oil, petrochemicals, and refined petroleum products
- fertilizer
- glass
- hydrogen
- lithium-ion batteries
- natural gas
- pulp and paper
- refined strategic and critical minerals
- solar cells and panels
- uranium
- wind turbines

The Act is intended to support the assertion that American manufacturers work within cleaner production standards than much of the world and quantify the degree to which environmental investments and policies have resulted in cleaner manufacturing in the United States and other countries.
