= Eco-tariff =

Tariff to equalise externality costs

An eco-tariff, also known as an environmental tariff, is a trade barrier for the purpose of reducing pollution and improving the environment. These trade barriers may take the form of import or export taxes on products that have a large carbon footprint or are imported from countries with lax environmental regulations. A carbon tariff is a type of eco-tariff.

== International trade vs. environmental degradation ==
There is debate on the role that increased international trade has played in increasing pollution. While some maintain that increases in pollution which result in both local environmental degradation and a global tragedy of the commons are intimately linked to increases in international trade, others have argued that as citizens become more affluent they'll also advocate for cleaner environments. According to a World Bank paper:

Since freer trade raises income, it directly contributes to increasing pollution levels via the scale effect. However, it thereby induces the composition (and) technique effects of increased income, both of which tend to reduce pollution levels.

Proponents of environmental tariff implementation have highlighted that if implemented correctly, the tariff could serve to stop strategic behavior of foreign nations and return efficient economic policy in the foreign country. Additionally, environmental standards will be harmonized between the trading nations as a result of the environmental tariff.

One of the major issues that are raised when discussing environmental tariffs, is the issue of a reduction in trade. The argument raised is that tariffs reduce trade and may not actually be targeting the actual source of the pollution. They argue that pollution is not just as a result of imported goods but a large part of pollution suffered occurs within the borders of a country, therefore trade would merely harming trade without actually addressing the root cause effectively.

== Early tariff implementation proposal ==
Although the United States has in the past been accused of dragging its feet on implementing tough new anti-pollution measures, it was the originator of a legislative proposal suggesting an environmental tariff be applied against exporting countries whose exports gained significant cost advantages due to less stringent environmental regulations. The proposed legislation was tabled as the International Pollution Deterrence Act of 1991 and was introduced in its Senate in April of that year.

=== Doha Ministerial Declaration ===
Negotiations took place in 2001 Doha, Qatar, towards the improvement of work related issues concerning the implementation of present agreements. This was a mandated conference dubbed the Fourth Ministerial Conference. One of the issues discussed concerned the issues of trade barriers on environmental goods and services. The result of which was ministers agreeing to a reduction or complete removal of tariff and non-tariff barriers to environmental goods and services such as catalytic converters and air filters to name a few.

=== Proposed International Pollution Control Index ===
A notable feature of the proposed U.S. International Pollution Deterrence Act was the international pollution control index it cited within its Section 5, which read:

INTERNATIONAL POLLUTION CONTROL INDEX

Section 8002 of the Solid Waste Disposal Act (42 U.S.C. 6982) is amended by adding the following new subsections at the end thereof:

`(t) The Administrator shall prepare, within one hundred and twenty days of the enactment of this section and yearly thereafter, a pollution control index for each of the top fifty countries identified by the Office of Trade and Investment of the Department of Commerce based on the value of exports to the United States from that country's attainment of pollution control standards in the areas of air, water, hazardous waste and solid waste as compared to the United States. The purpose of this index is to measure the level of compliance within each country with standards comparable to or greater than those in the United States. The Administrator shall analyze, in particular, the level of technology employed and actual costs incurred for pollution control in the major export sectors of each country in formulating the index.

== Carbon tariff ==
A carbon tariff or border carbon adjustment (BCA) is an eco-tariff on embedded carbon. The aim is generally to prevent carbon leakage from states without a carbon price. Examples of imports which are high-carbon and so may be subject to a carbon tariff are electricity generated by coal-fired power stations, iron and steel from blast furnaces, and fertilizer from the Haber process.

Currently, only California applies a BCA for electricity, while the European Union and the United Kingdom will apply BCAs from 2026 and 2027, respectively. Several other countries and territories with emissions pricing are considering them.

== Criticism ==
Environmental tariffs may result in the movement in production of goods to areas in which stricter environmental standards are enforced. Environment tariffs were not implemented in the past, in part, because they were not sanctioned by multilateral trade regimes such as the World Trade Organization (WTO) and within the General Agreement on Tariffs and Trade (GATT), a fact which generated considerable criticism and calls for reform.

Moreover, the GATT does condone the use of tariffs as market interventions, so long as the interventions do not discriminate products, both foreign and domestic. A disputed case relating to this policy was brought forth to the GATT/WTO, involving the U.S. and Canada over Canadian environmental regulations on beverage containers.

Additionally, many foreign factory owners in newly industrialized countries and underdeveloped countries saw the attempts to impose pollution controls on them as suspicious...

"...seeing it as a threat to their growth and fearing that developed countries would attempt to export their preferences for pollution control or to place 'environmental' tariffs on imports from countries with lower standards."

Moreover, the problem of what the ideal tariff level is also a cause for concern when implementing environmental tariffs.

Further implementation problems have been as a result of what some developing nations may view as green protectionism. Green protectionism is the use of methods meant to address legitimate environment goals for the end goal of protection of domestic industry.

== See also ==
- American Clean Energy and Security Act
- Carbon fee and dividend
- Ecotax
- Environmental economics
- Externality – In economics, an imposed cost or benefit
- Green politics
- PROVE IT Act – proposed international emissions intensity data-gathering legislation in the United States
- Tragedy of the commons – Overuse of a shared resource
