= EU Carbon Border Adjustment Mechanism =

EU carbon tariff on carbon intensive products

Regulation (EU) 2023/956
- European Union regulation
- Text with EEA relevance
- Title: Regulation of the European Parliament and the Council establishing a carbon border adjustment mechanism
- Made under: Article 192(1) of the TFEU
- Journal reference: 2023/956

History
- European Parliament vote: 18 April 2023
- Council Vote: 25 April 2023
- Date made: 10 May 2023
- Entry into force: 17 May 2023

Preparative texts
- Commission proposal: COM/2021/564 final

The EU Carbon Border Adjustment Mechanism (CBAM, pronounced /ˈsiːbæm/) is a carbon tariff on carbon intensive products, such as steel, cement and some electricity, imported to the European Union. Legislated as part of the European Green Deal, it took effect in 2026, with reporting starting in 2023. CBAM was passed by the European Parliament with 450 votes for, 115 against, and 55 abstentions and the Council of the EU with 24 countries in favour. It entered into force on 17 May 2023.

== Contents ==
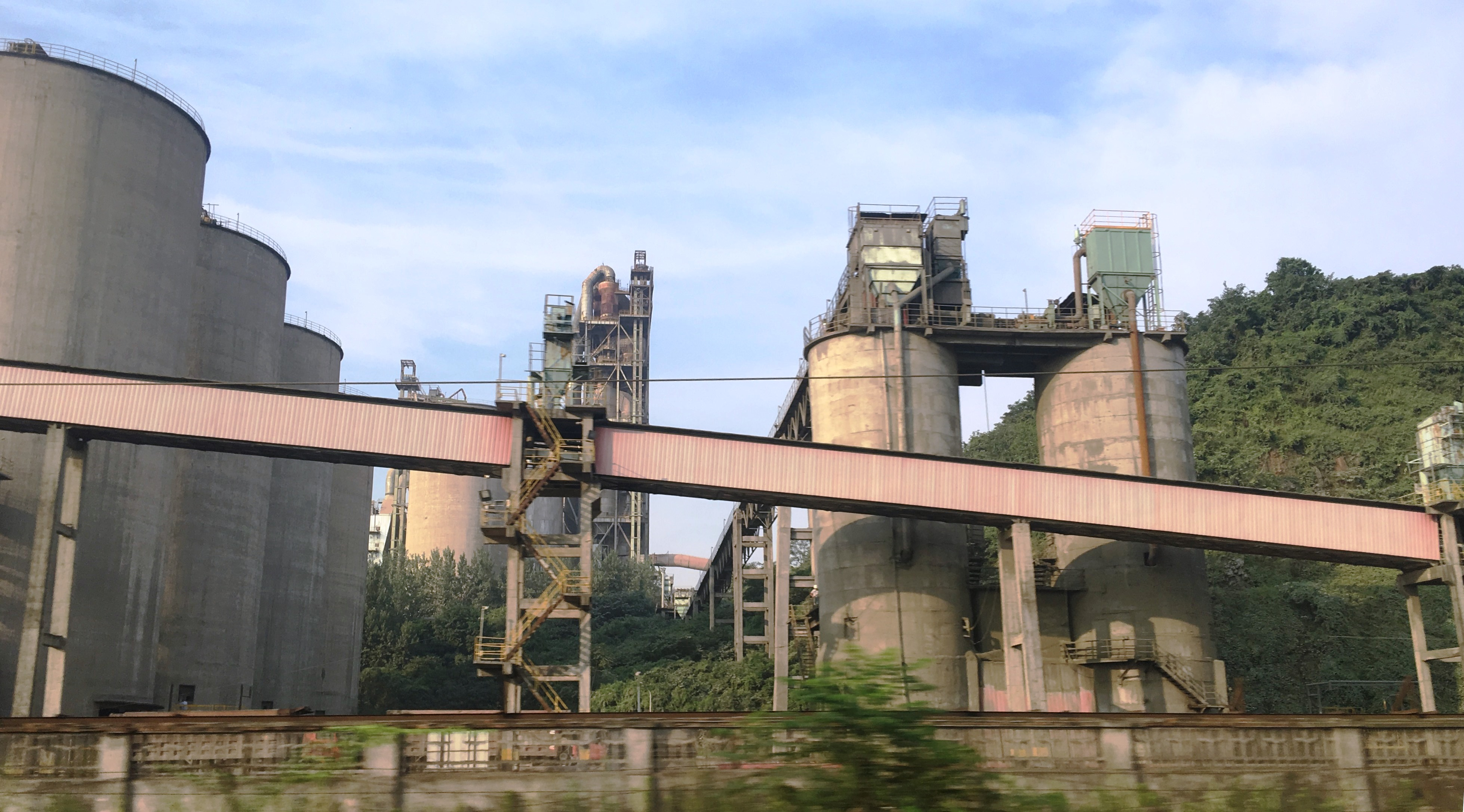
The China Cement Factory in Qixia (Nanjing), Jiangsu Province, China. EU importers of Chinese cement require CBAM certificates.

The price of CBAM certificates is linked to the price of EU allowances under the European Union Emissions Trading System introduced in 2005. The CBAM is designed to stem carbon leakage to countries without a carbon price, and also permits the EU to stop giving free allowances to some carbon-intensive sectors within its borders. All this should hasten decarbonisation.

Once fully implemented, importers will be required to purchase CBAM certificates to cover the embedded emissions in their imported goods, creating a direct financial liability that varies week-to-week with ETS prices.

After the political (provisional) agreement between the Council and the European Parliament was reached in December 2022, the CBAM entered into force on October 1, 2023 and is passing through several phases:

From October 2023 to the end of 2025 transitional phase: importers of products in six carbon intensive sectors highly exposed to international trade, namely aluminium, cement, electricity, fertilisers, hydrogen and iron and steel reported their emissions. During the transitional phase, the regulators checked if other products can be added to the list like for example some downstream products.

From the beginning of 2026 importers of products included in these 6 sectors paid a border carbon tax for their products based on the price of allowances in the European Union Emissions Trading System.

By 2030 all sectors covered by the European Union Emissions Trading System will be covered by CBAM.

By 2034 free allowances in the relevant sectors in the European Union will be phased out as the fully implemented CBAM ensures a level playing field for European companies in comparison to importers.

In December 2025, the European Commission proposed extending the CBAM from 2028 to around 180 downstream products with a high steel or aluminium content, such as car doors, gearboxes and household appliances. In June 2026, EU member states agreed to broaden the mechanism to these new imported products.

To address the 'lose-lose' scenario of carbon leakage, characterised by a general loss of competitiveness of EU industries with no gain from the perspective of climate protection, the CBAM requires importers of the targeted goods to purchase a sufficient amount of 'CBAM certificates' to cover the emissions embedded in their products. Since the main purpose of the CBAM is to avoid carbon leakage, the mechanism tries to subject covered imports to the same carbon price imposed on internal producers under the EU ETS. In other words, the EU is trying to make importers bear an equivalent burden, for what concerns regulatory costs, to the costs of European producers.

Under article 6, importers must make a "CBAM declaration" with the quantity of goods, embedded emissions, and certificates for payment of the carbon import tax.

Annex I sets out the goods that attract the import tax, including cement, electricity, fertilisers (such as nitric acid, ammonia, potassium), iron and steel (including tanks, drums, containers), and aluminium.

Annex II specifies that the CBAM does not apply to the four non-EU member states that are included in the European Economic Area, namely Iceland, Liechtenstein, Norway and Switzerland.

Annex III sets out the methods for calculating embedded greenhouse gas emissions.

A proposal has been made to reform the EU CBAM into a "CBAM-plus" mechanism. CBAM-plus would redirect revenues from the CBAM to support decarbonisation efforts in developing exporting countries and recognise their diverse climate actions. By aligning climate and development objectives, CBAM-plus could foster greater international support than the current CBAM.

== Debate ==
The implementation of the CBAM by the EU is a major step towards addressing the issue of carbon leakage and ensuring a level playing field for European businesses worldwide against cheaper goods from economies outside the EU lacking carbon taxation. The import partners most affected will be Russia, China, Turkey, Ukraine, the Balkans, as well as Mozambique, Zimbabwe, and Cameroon. This mechanism allows the EU to unilaterally impose a levy on imports from countries that do not meet the environmental standards set by the EU.

=== Compliance and monitoring ===
Since July 2024 the EU demands "real data" on how energy intensive imported goods were produced, while estimated standard values are only allowed for some 20% of the emissions. A spokesperson of the Mechanical Engineering Industry Association (VDMA) complained in September 2024, that the required data are often not available, either because the suppliers do not collect them in the first place, or are not willing to hand them over. Additionally, every importer can be held accountable for the data they collect from their suppliers, but often lack the resources to control them all, or the influence to force the suppliers to comply with the CBAM regulations. Furthermore the national offices which are meant to help companies with problems to obtain accurate data, were often not functional yet. The de minimis rule exempts imports up to €150 from CBAM while VDMA representatives campaign to raise that to €5000.

=== WTO compatibility and non-discrimination ===
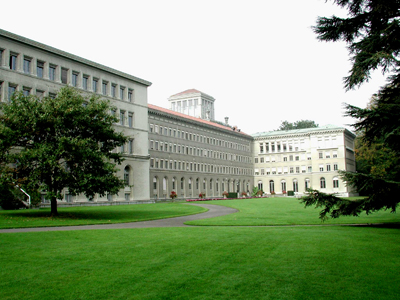
WTO headquarters in Geneva

The EU should ensure that the CBAM is compatible with its international obligations under the World Trade Organization (WTO), according to two legal scholars at the University of Ottawa. This means that the mechanism should not discriminate against any particular country or violate the principles of free trade. The EU should also engage in constructive dialogue with its trading partners, including major emitters such as China and the United States, to ensure that the CBAM is consistent with global climate goals and does not create unnecessary tensions or trade disputes.

In terms of trade perspectives, the countries most affected in absolute terms are those in the European neighborhood, particularly Russia, Turkey, and Ukraine. These countries are major exporters to the EU in the primary CBAM sectors (iron, steel, cement, aluminium, fertilizer, and electricity).

Emission trading and carbon taxes around the world (2021) Carbon emission trading implemented or scheduled Carbon tax implemented or scheduled Carbon emission trading or carbon tax under consideration

=== Incentivisation of carbon pricing in countries outside the EU ===
If countries outside the European Union have or will create their own carbon pricing policies, "they will avoid the EU's carbon border tax and keep the revenues for their own decarbonization projects". A similar UK CBAM will be implemented by 2027.

The carbon import fee is not yet proposed to apply to a wide range of other products or services, such as automobiles, clothing, food and animal products (including those that lead to deforestation), shipping, aviation, or the importation of gas, oil and coal.

It has been suggested that the mechanism will help reduce emissions not only by making companies reduce emissions but also by incentivising other countries (like the United States, which lacks federal carbon pricing) to create similar mechanisms. Some authors even argue that the CBAM constitutes the beginning of a climate club, as proposed by Nobel Memorial Prize winner William Nordhaus. One simulation made by "Sandbag" showed Japan, China and South Korea will be among the countries which will pay the highest fees, and all the 3 already began to improve their emissions trading systems. The effects on the economies of Ukraine, Moldova, or Uzbekistan can be even higher.

Chinese steel will lose its low price advantage in the European Union by the end of 2027 with CBAM, if the embedded emissions will not be reduced, the price of Indian steel will rise even more. Already in 2026, Turkish steel will become cheaper than Chinese despite higher cost of production, because Turkey use electric arc furnaces.

China intend to expand its ETS to new sectors and will put an absolute cap on emissions instead of intensity based, by 2027, among other because of CBAM. After the expansion, the system should cover most of major carbon emitting sectors.

The carbon market in India and Turkish Emissions Trading System aim to keep the revenues for their own budgets. Other countries installing their own carbon pricing mechanisms due to CBAM include Brazil, Indonesia, Taiwan, Vietnam, Malaysia and Serbia. Countries considerating to create their own carbon border adjustment mechanism include Australia, Canada, Norway, Taiwan. The Open Coalition on Compliance Carbon Markets with the aim of establishing a global carbon market was created in the COP 30, partially due to CBAM.

According to a report of the Asian Development Bank, the CBAM will reduce emissions only a little (which will be quickly offset by the rise in carbon intensive production), while harming import to the European Union. The report says "mechanisms to share emission reduction technology would be more effective".

In January 2026, the government in India introduced Greenhouse gas emission Intensity targets for an additional 208 units. This brings the sectors of petroleum refineries, petrochemicals, textiles, and secondary aluminium into the Indian Carbon Market, so it covers 490 obligated entities in India's most carbon emitting sectors. One of the aims is to create a "CBAM Resilience".

Thailand, Singapore, South Africa are also strengthening their carbon pricing systems due to CBAM.

=== Developing countries ===
According to one Amsterdam legal scholar, the EU should provide adequate support to the least developed countries (LDCs) to help them comply with the CBAM. This support could include technical assistance, capacity building, or financial incentives for investments in low-carbon technologies. By providing such support, the EU can ensure that businesses have the necessary resources and knowledge to transition to a low-carbon economy and avoid the risk of carbon leakage. Another author has suggested that the transition to a low-carbon economy requires technology and investment, which may require investment in countries in the Global South. Proposed solutions include technology transfer and green finance.

Support from lower-income countries, such as Côte d'Ivoire, Colombia, and Vietnam, is primarily driven by established trade relations with the EU and the potential for EU development aid to offset transition costs.

=== Potential Global Support ===
While many major economies like China, India, and the United States have expressed skepticism or "howls of protest" regarding CBAM, research indicates a wide range of potential supporters among other trade partners.

According to a 2024 multidimensional index (the CBAM Support Index), the nations most likely to support the mechanism are Japan, South Korea, and Singapore. These countries are positioned as allies due to their high innovation capacities and existing domestic carbon policies.

=== Exports ===
Border adjustments for imports but not for exports leads to reduced global competitiveness for domestic carbon-intensive products.

=== Counterproductive regulation ===
The EU's cross-border tax is based on the "polluter pays" principle, but market reactions indicate otherwise. This EU carbon border adjustment mechanism could be counterproductive regulation and an additional burden for European companies.

According to one study, the regulation may place an additional regulatory burden on EU companies. The study examined how listed companies in CBAM sectors from 75 different countries responded to three key moments in the regulatory legislative process.

It found that share price declines were greater for EU CBAM companies than for non-EU CBAM companies in the same sectors. The negative market response was concentrated among EU companies subject to the CBAM with low profit margins.
