= Carbon tariff =

Border adjustment for embedded carbon

A carbon tariff or border carbon adjustment (BCA) is an eco-tariff on embedded carbon. The aim is generally to prevent carbon leakage from states without a carbon price. Examples of imports which are high-carbon and so may be subject to a carbon tariff are electricity generated by coal-fired power stations, iron and steel from blast furnaces, and fertilizer from the Haber process.

Currently, only California applies a BCA for electricity, while the European Union and the United Kingdom will apply BCAs from 2026 and 2027, respectively. Several other countries and territories with emissions pricing are considering them.

== Existing and forthcoming ==
=== European Union ===
The EU Carbon Border Adjustment Mechanism (CBAM, pronounced /ˈsiːbæm/) is a carbon tariff on carbon intensive products, such as steel, cement and some electricity, imported to the European Union. Legislated as part of the European Green Deal, it took effect in 2026, with reporting starting in 2023. CBAM was passed by the European Parliament with 450 votes for, 115 against, and 55 abstentions and the Council of the EU with 24 countries in favour. It entered into force on 17 May 2023.

=== United Kingdom ===
The United Kingdom Carbon Border Adjustment Mechanism (UK CBAM) is a carbon tariff on imports of certain goods produced with high carbon emission into the United Kingdom, similar to the European Union's CBAM. It will cover slightly different goods, and is scheduled to launch on 1 January 2027. The sectors within scope are aluminium, cement, ceramics, fertiliser, glass, hydrogen, iron and steel. There are some differences regarding the type of emissions covered. Both EU and UK CBAM cover direct ('Scope 1') emissions. Regarding indirect ('Scope 2') emissions, the EU covers only emissions from electricity consumed during the production process. The UK CBAM proposals cover more indirect emissions, namely from heat, steam and cooling, on top of electricity.

=== California ===
The California Cap-and-Trade Program has a carbon border adjustment mechanism for imported electricity since 2011, and is required to report to the Legislature in 2025 on a potential extension of border adjustment to physical products.

== WTO rule compatibility ==
Current WTO rules may prohibit some types of carbon border adjustment. In 2024, the United States Democrats (then in government) stated that carbon border adjustment does not amount to a carbon tax but instead to a fee that is permissible under World Trade Organization(WTO) rules,. The WTO itself has not come to a conclusion.
