= UK CBAM =

Tariff on some high carbon imports to UK

The United Kingdom Carbon Border Adjustment Mechanism (UK CBAM) is a carbon tariff on imports of certain goods produced with high carbon emission into the United Kingdom, similar to the European Union's CBAM. It will cover slightly different goods, and will be rolled out in 2027. The sectors within scope are aluminium, cement, ceramics, fertiliser, glass, hydrogen, iron and steel. There are some differences regarding the type of emissions covered. Both EU and UK CBAM cover direct ('Scope 1') emissions. Regarding indirect ('Scope 2') emissions, the EU covers only emissions from electricity consumed during the production process. The UK CBAM proposals cover more indirect emissions, namely from heat, steam and cooling, on top of electricity.

== History ==
The first CBAM was set up by the EU and announced in 2019 by conservative Commission president Ursula von der Leyen, when the UK had not left the EU yet. When Britain left, it decoupled its emissions trading system from Europe, setting up the UK ETS. This would make it necessary to implement a separate UK CBAM. In Q2 of 2023, the Conservative government under Rishi Sunak and UK energy minister Graham Stuart consulted on a potential UK CBAM. A few months later, on 18 December 2023, it announced its intention to roll out a UK CBAM in 2027.
